= List of amphibians and reptiles of Nebraska =

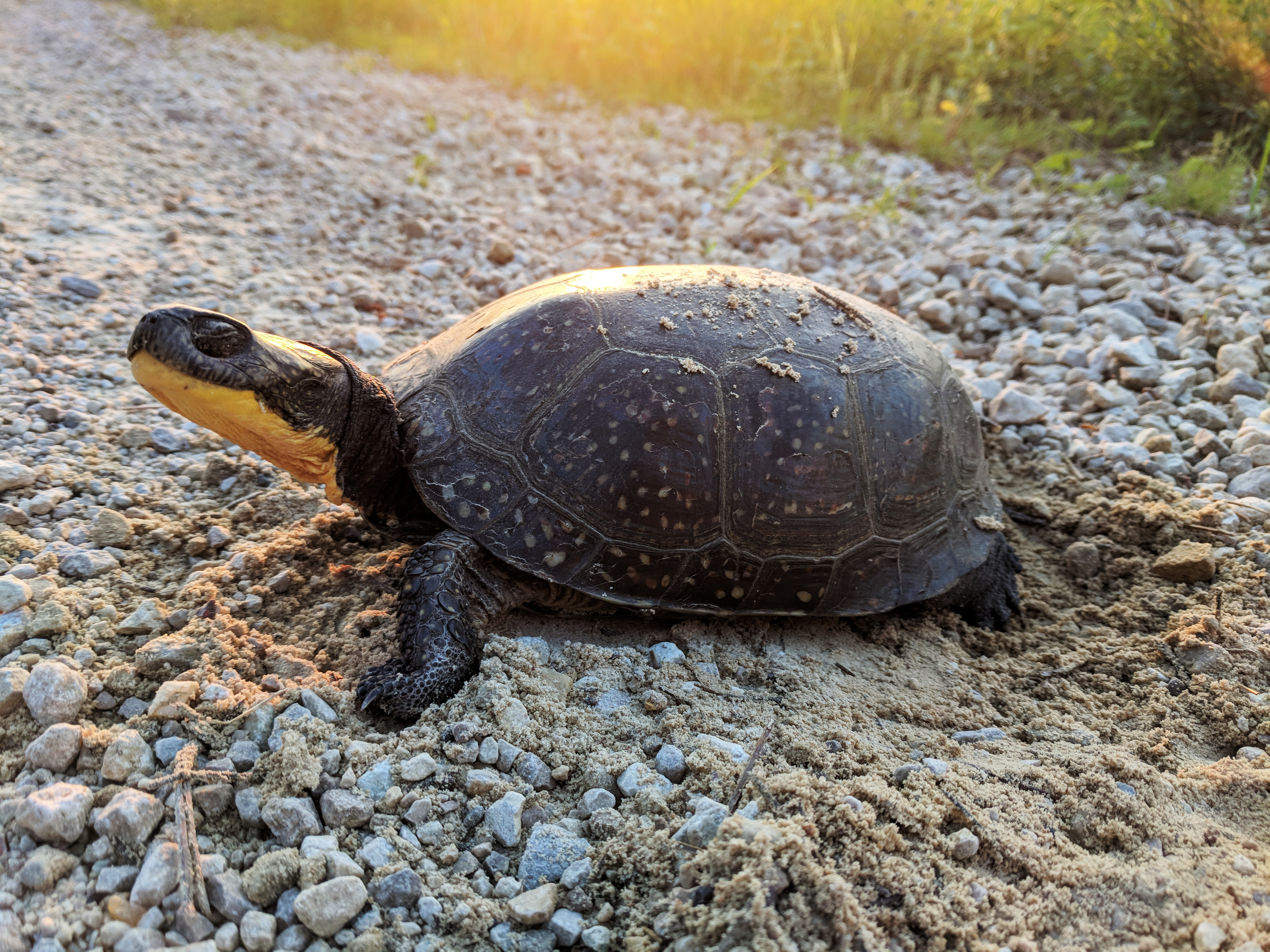
Blanding's turtle, an endangered species found in Nebraska

Thirteen species of amphibians and forty-seven species of reptiles are native to the U.S. state of Nebraska. This list only includes native species.

== Frogs and toads ==
Eleven species from five families, (Bufonidae, Hylidae, Microhylidae, Pelobatidae, and Ranidae), of frogs and toads are native to Nebraska.

- American bullfrog
- American toad
- Cope's gray tree frog
- Great Plains narrow-mouthed toad
- Great Plains toad
- Northern cricket frog
- Northern leopard frog
- Plains leopard frog
- Plains spadefoot toad
- Western chorus frog
- Woodhouse's toad
Native frogs and toads
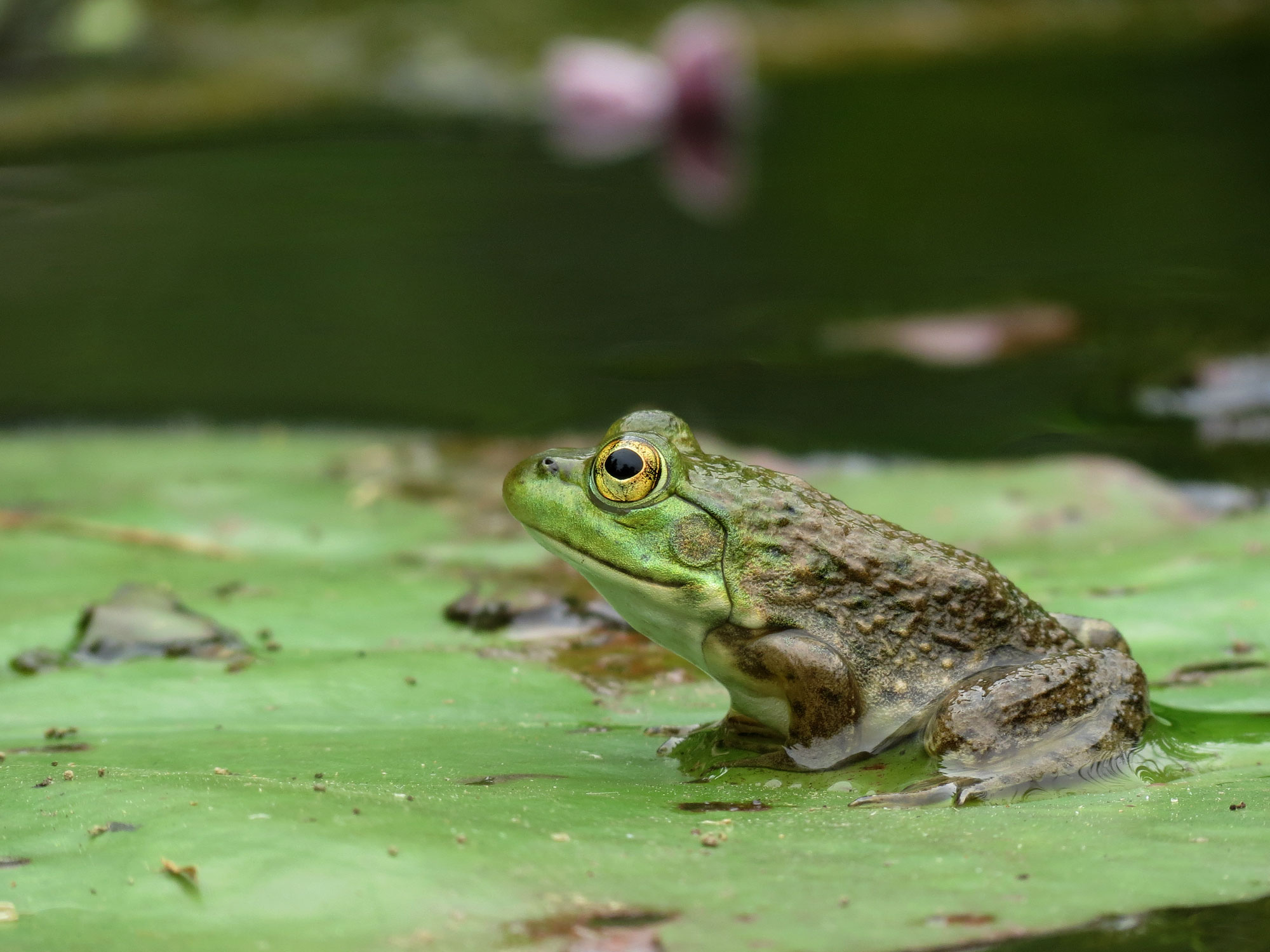
American bullfrog (Rana catesbeiana)

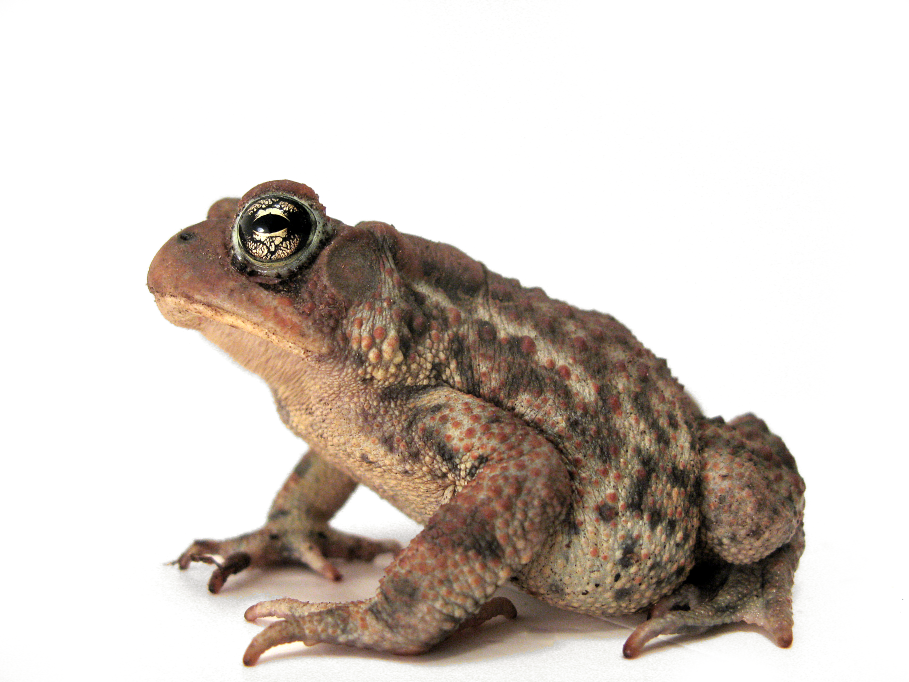
American toad (Bufo americanus)

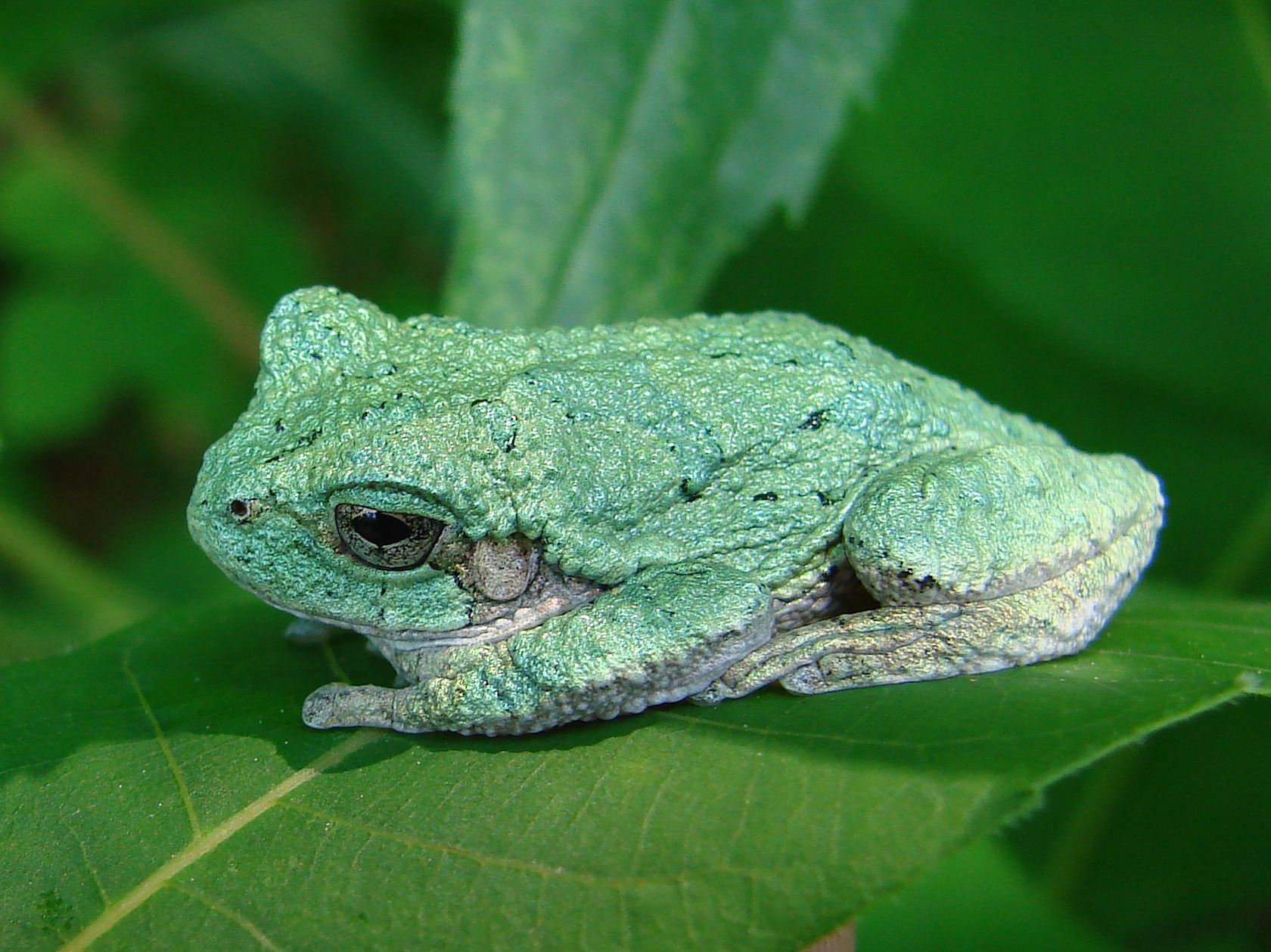
Cope's gray tree frog (Hyla chrysoscelis)

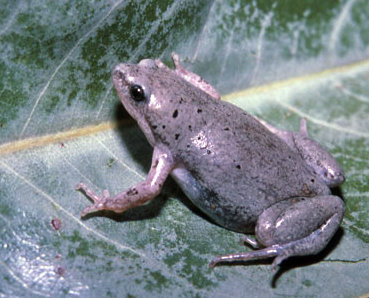
Great Plains narrow-mouthed toad (Gastrophryne olivacea)

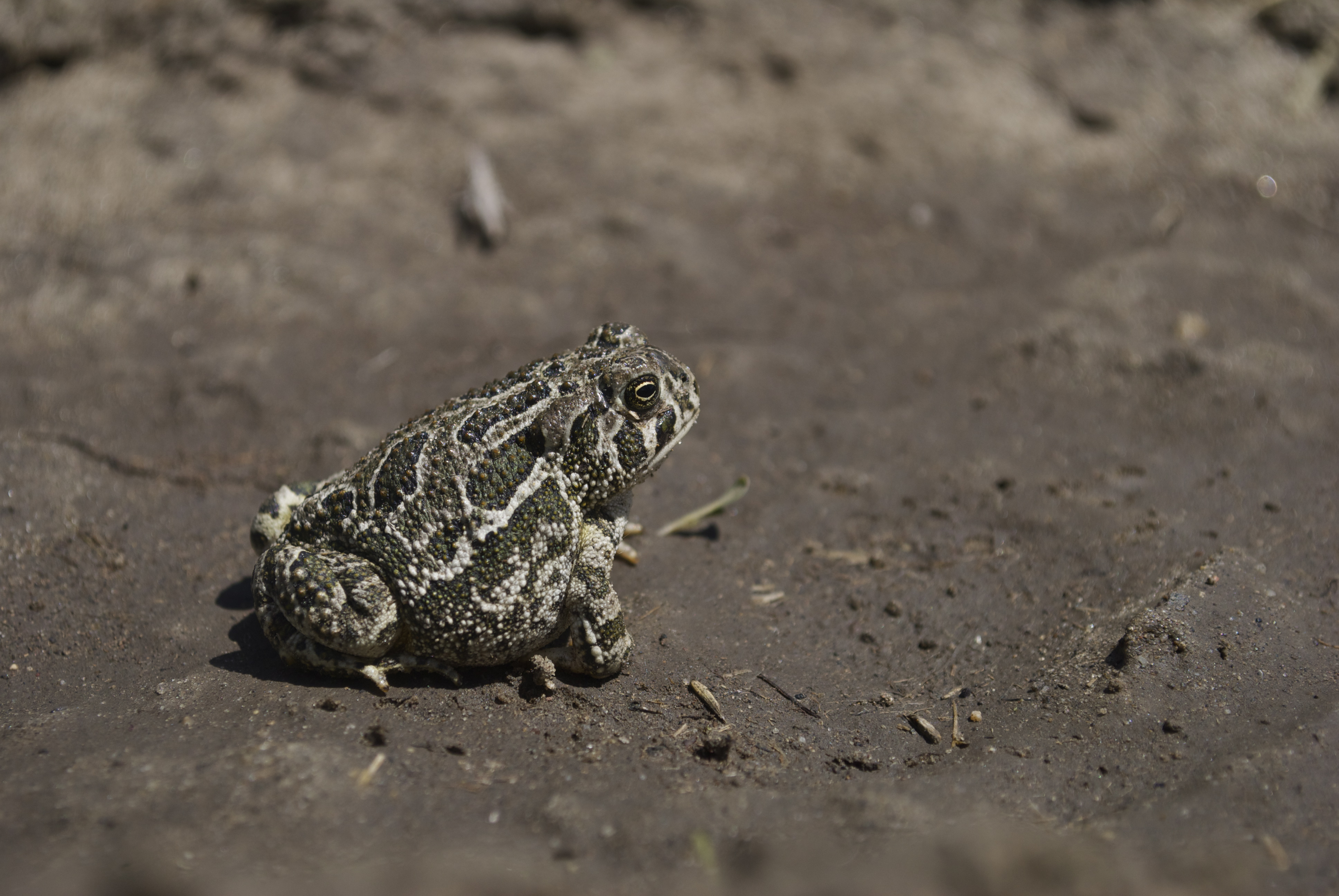
Great Plains toad (Anaxyrus cognatus)

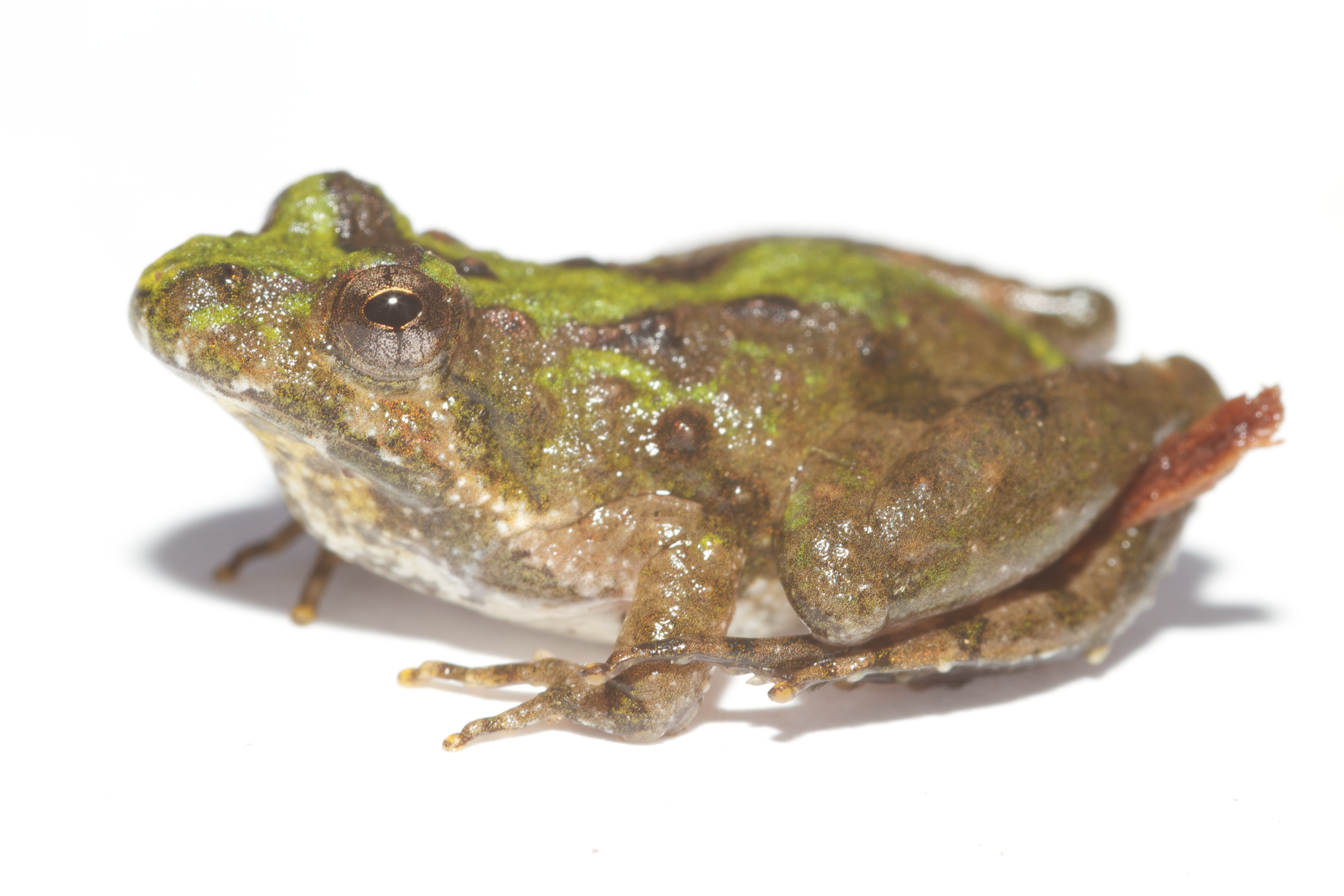
Northern cricket frog (Acris crepitans)

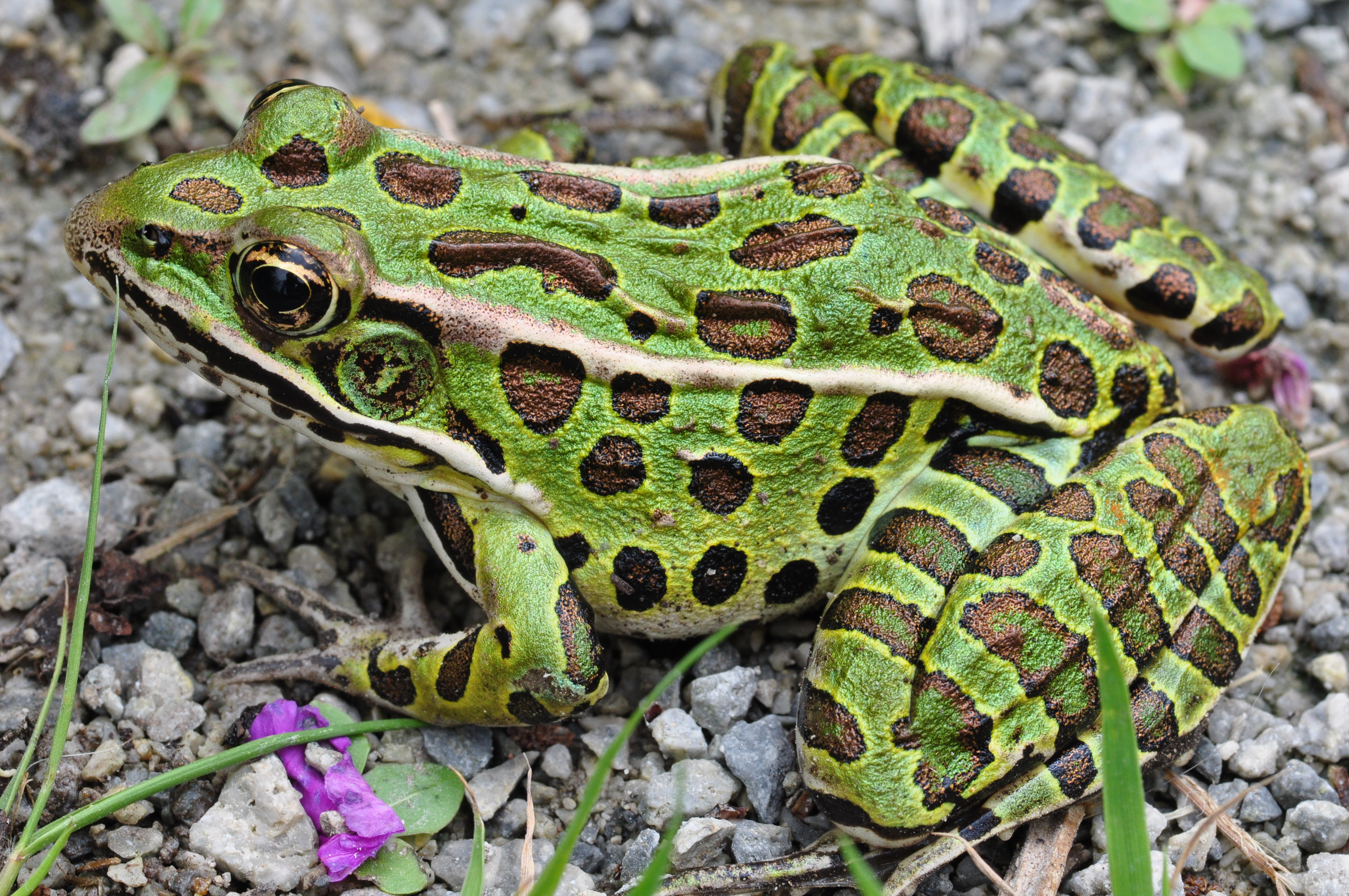
Northern leopard frog (Lithobates pipiens)

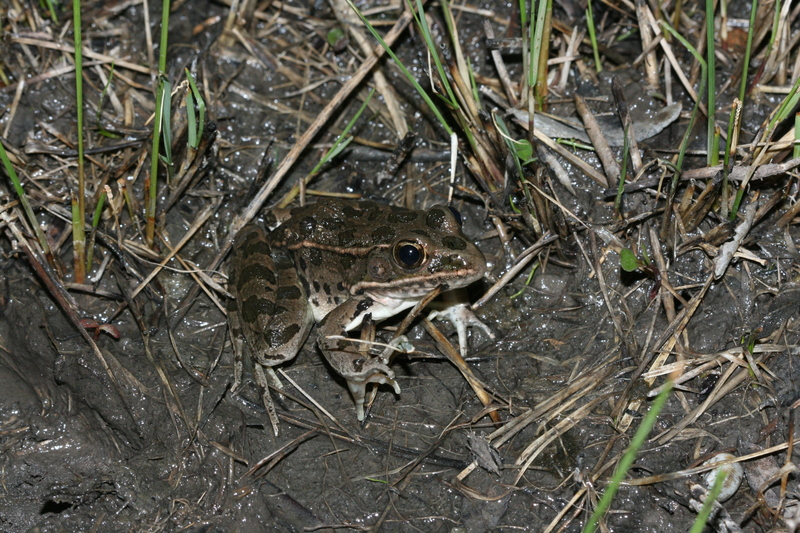
Plains leopard frog (Lithobates blairi)

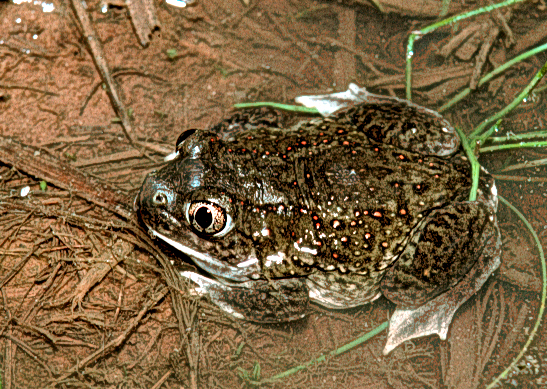
Plains spadefoot toad (Spea bombifrons)

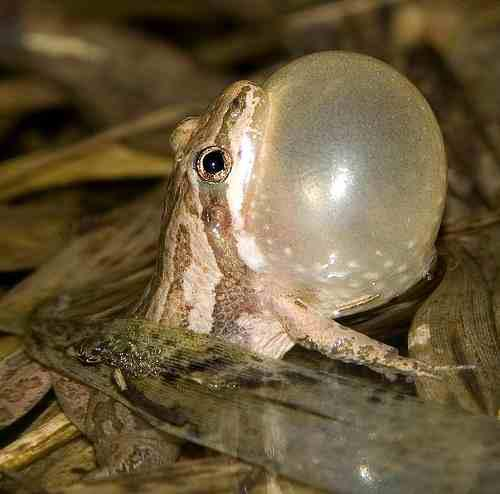
Western chorus frog (Pseudacris triseriata)

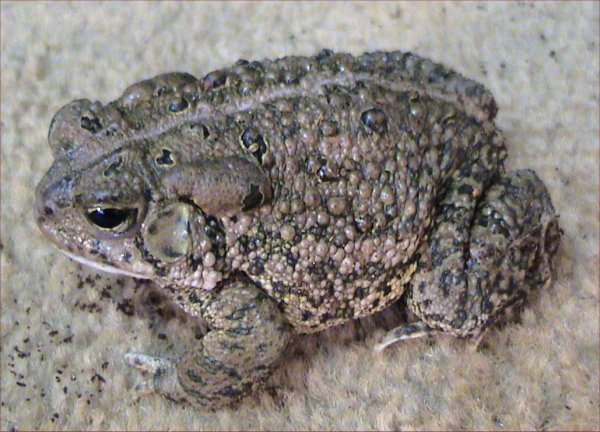
Woodhouse's toad (Anaxyrus woodhousii)

== Lizards ==
Ten species of lizards are native to Nebraska.

- Six-lined racerunner
- Five-lined skink
- Many-lined skink
- Great Plains skink
- Prairie skink
- Lesser earless lizard
- Slender glass lizard
- Pygmy short-horned lizard
- Sagebrush lizard
- Eastern fence lizard
Native lizards
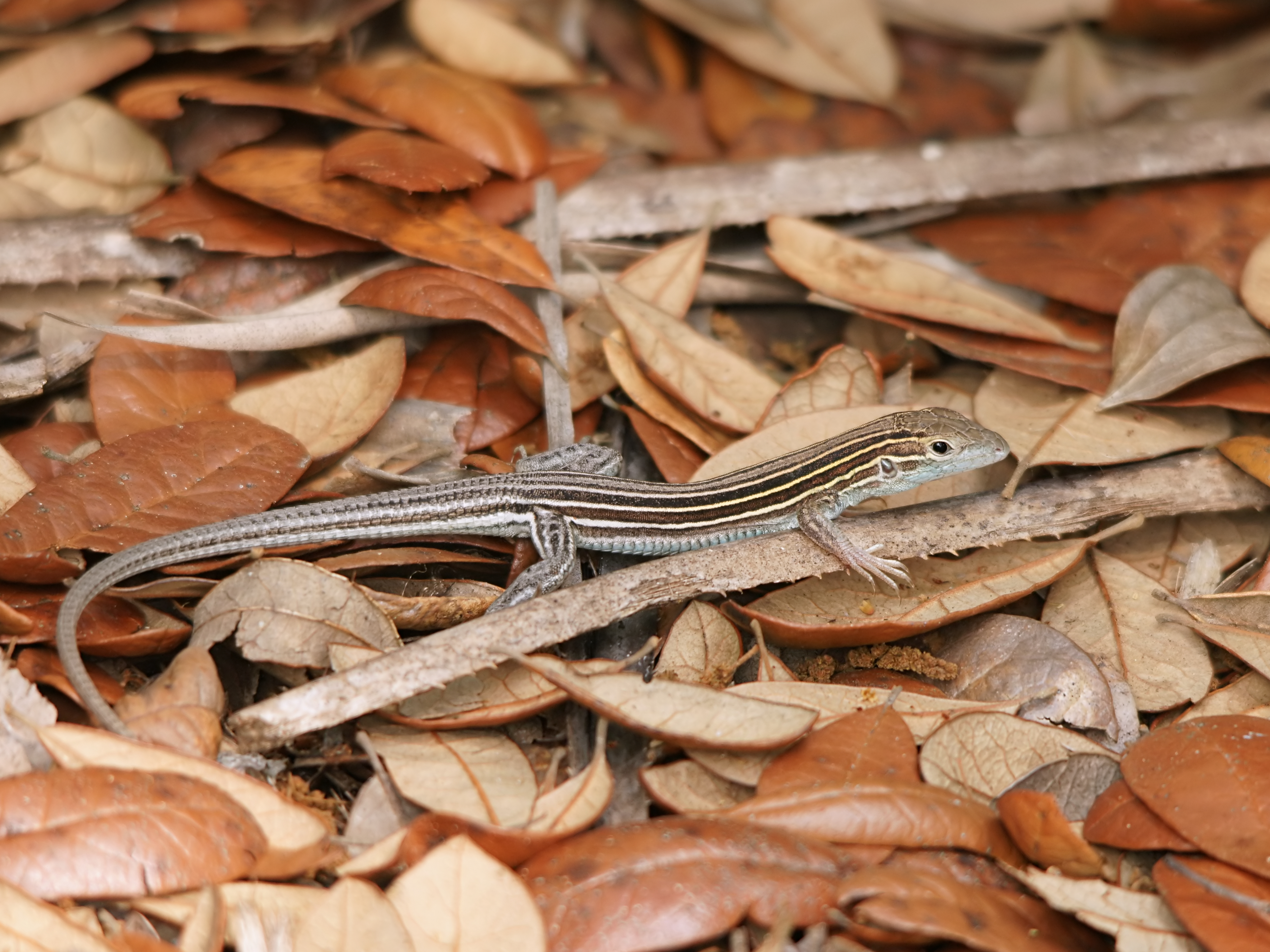
Six-lined racerunner (Aspidoscelis sexlineatus)

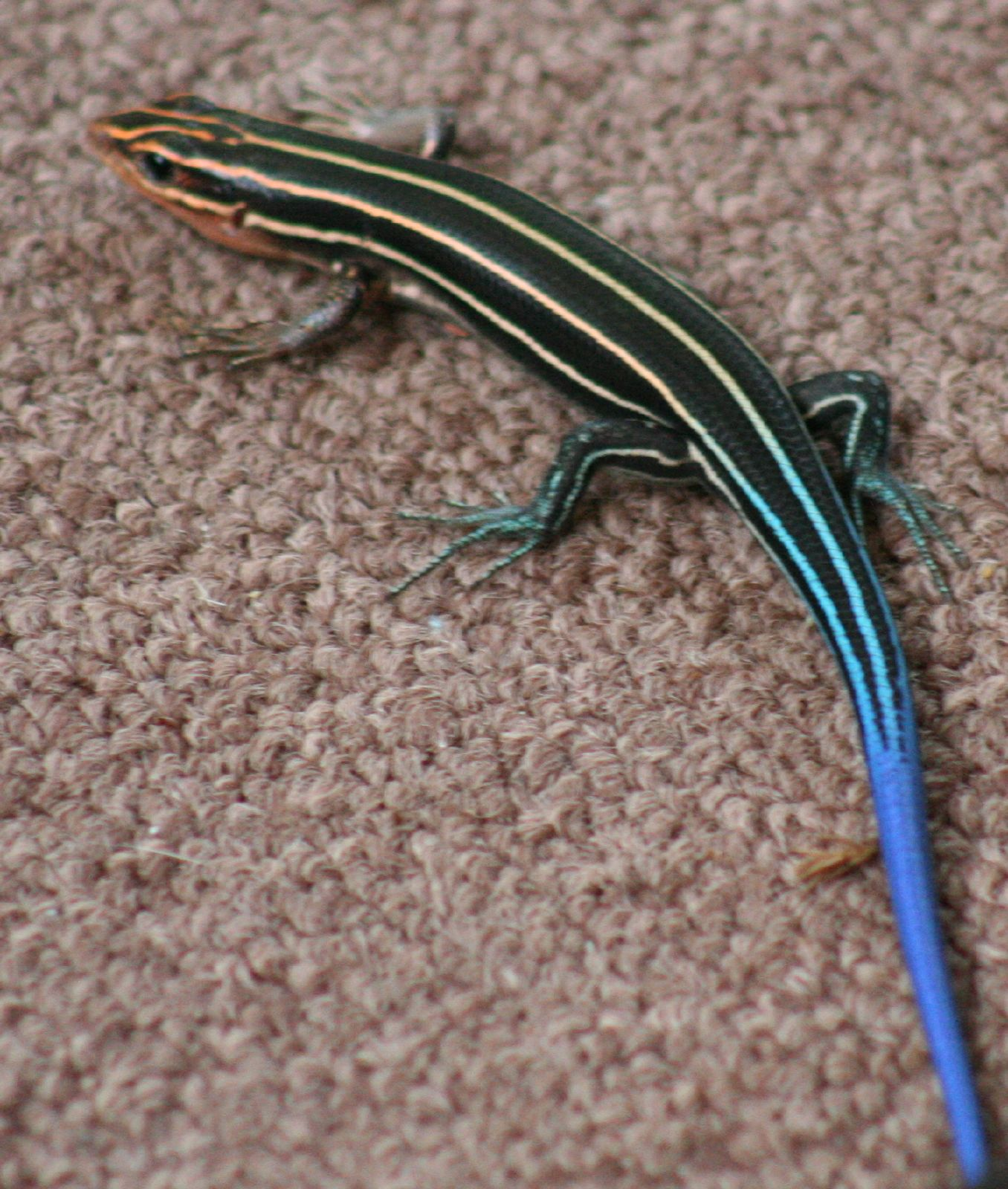
Five-lined skink (Plestiodon fasciatus)

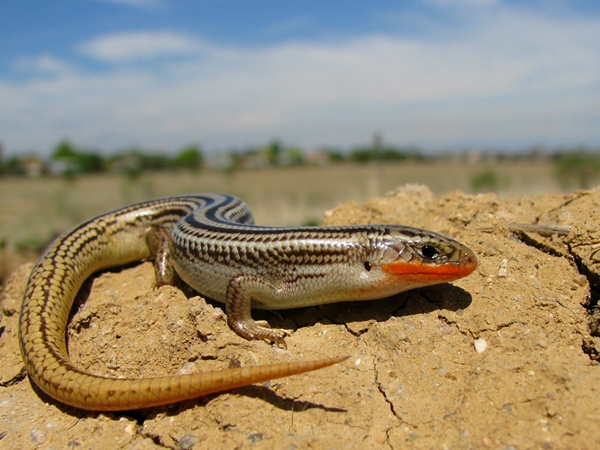
Many-lined skink (Plestiodon multivirgatus)

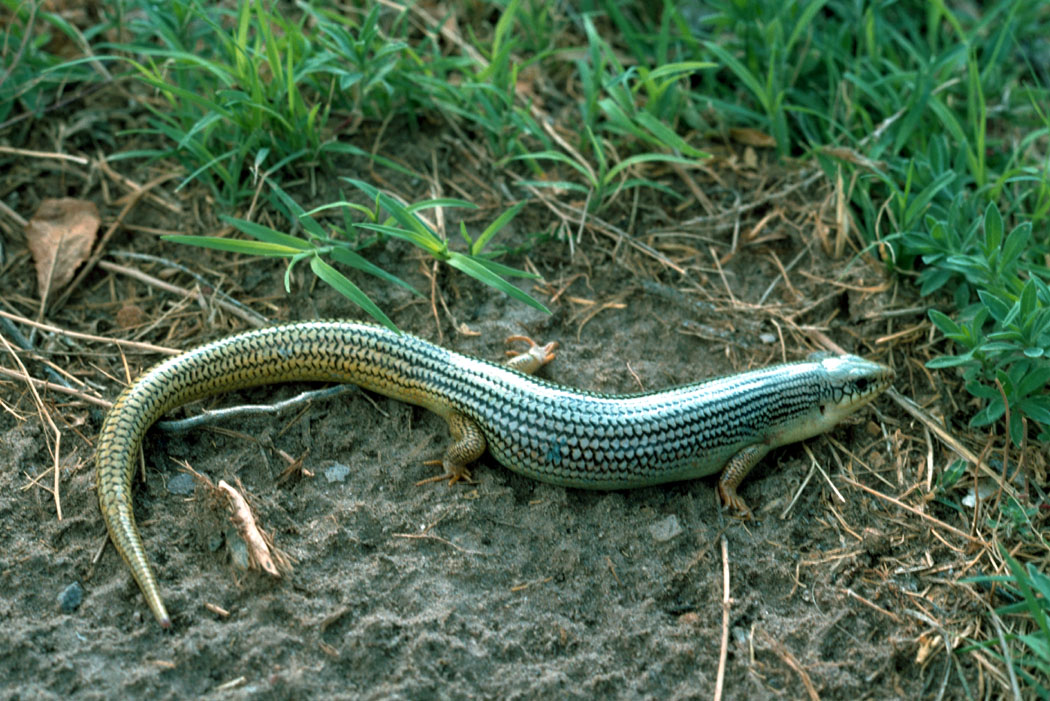
Great Plains skink (Plestiodon obsoletus)

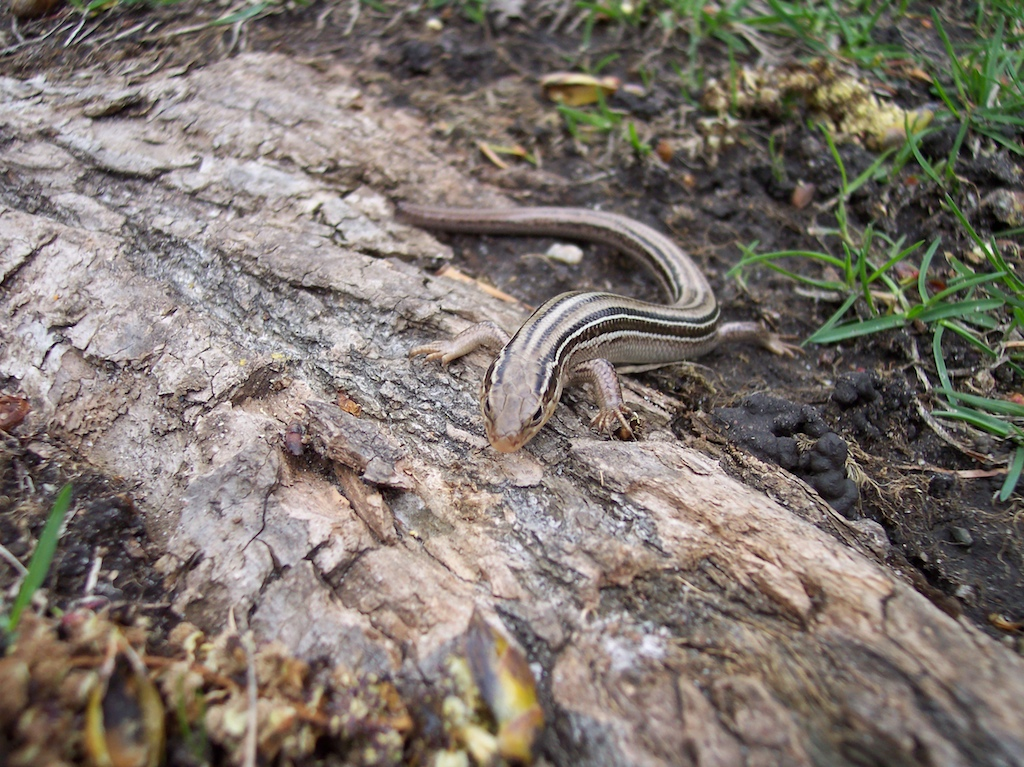
Prairie skink (Plestiodon septentrionalis)

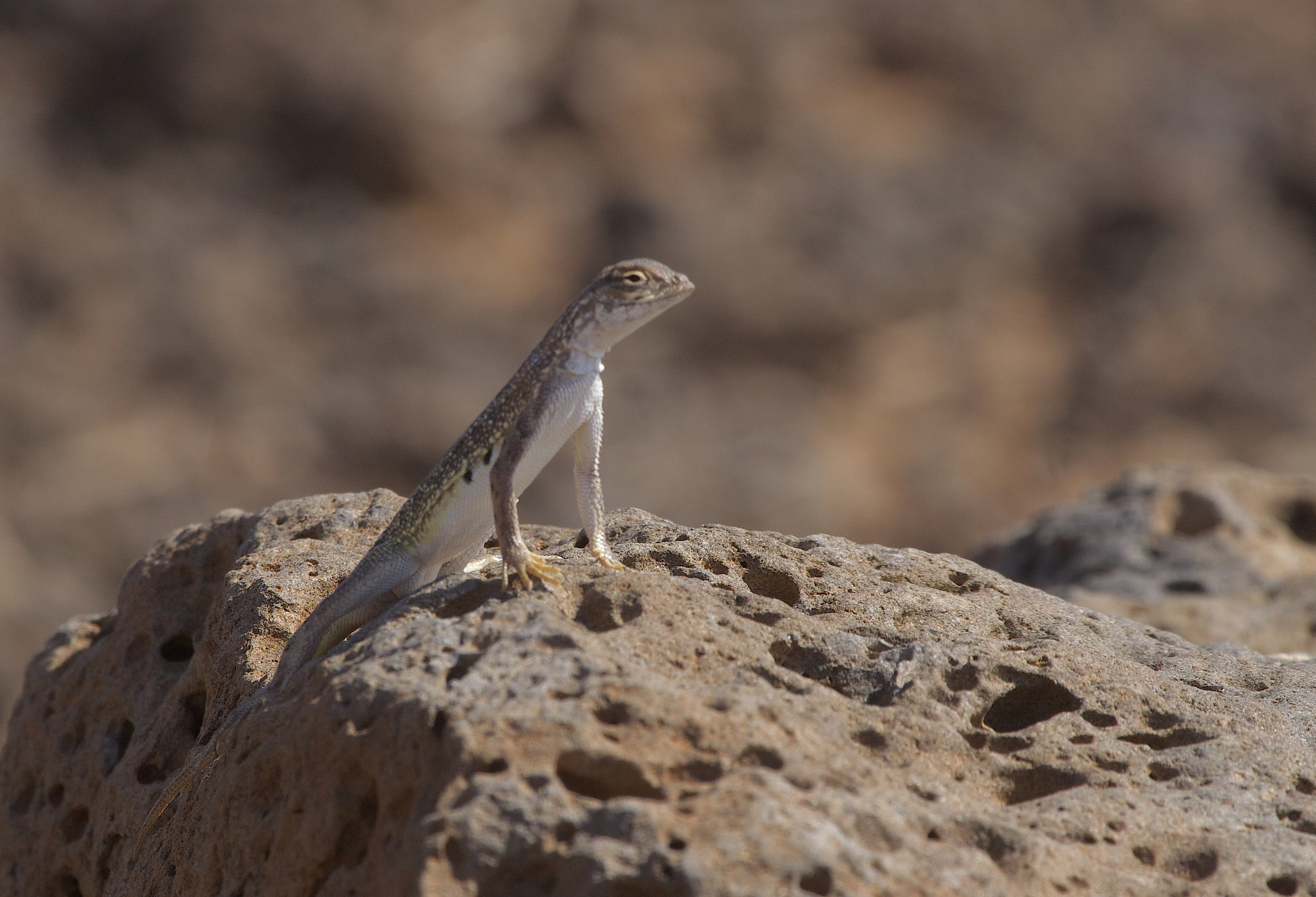
Lesser earless lizard (Holbrookia maculata)

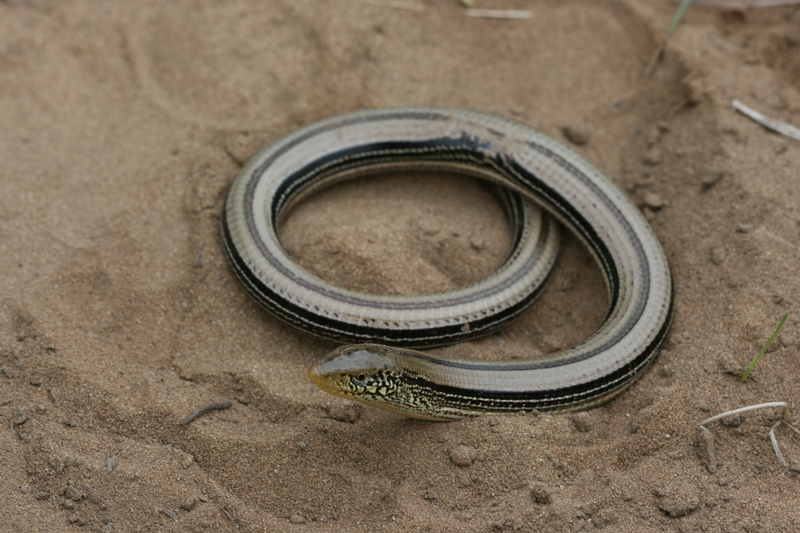
Slender glass lizard (Ophisaurus attenuatus)

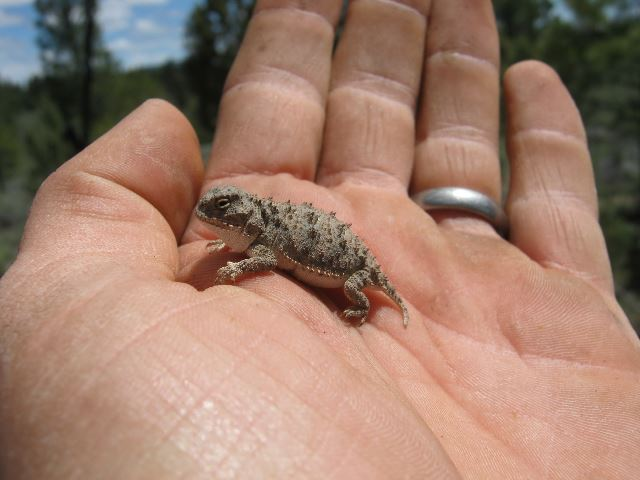
Pygmy short-horned lizard (Phrynosoma douglasii)

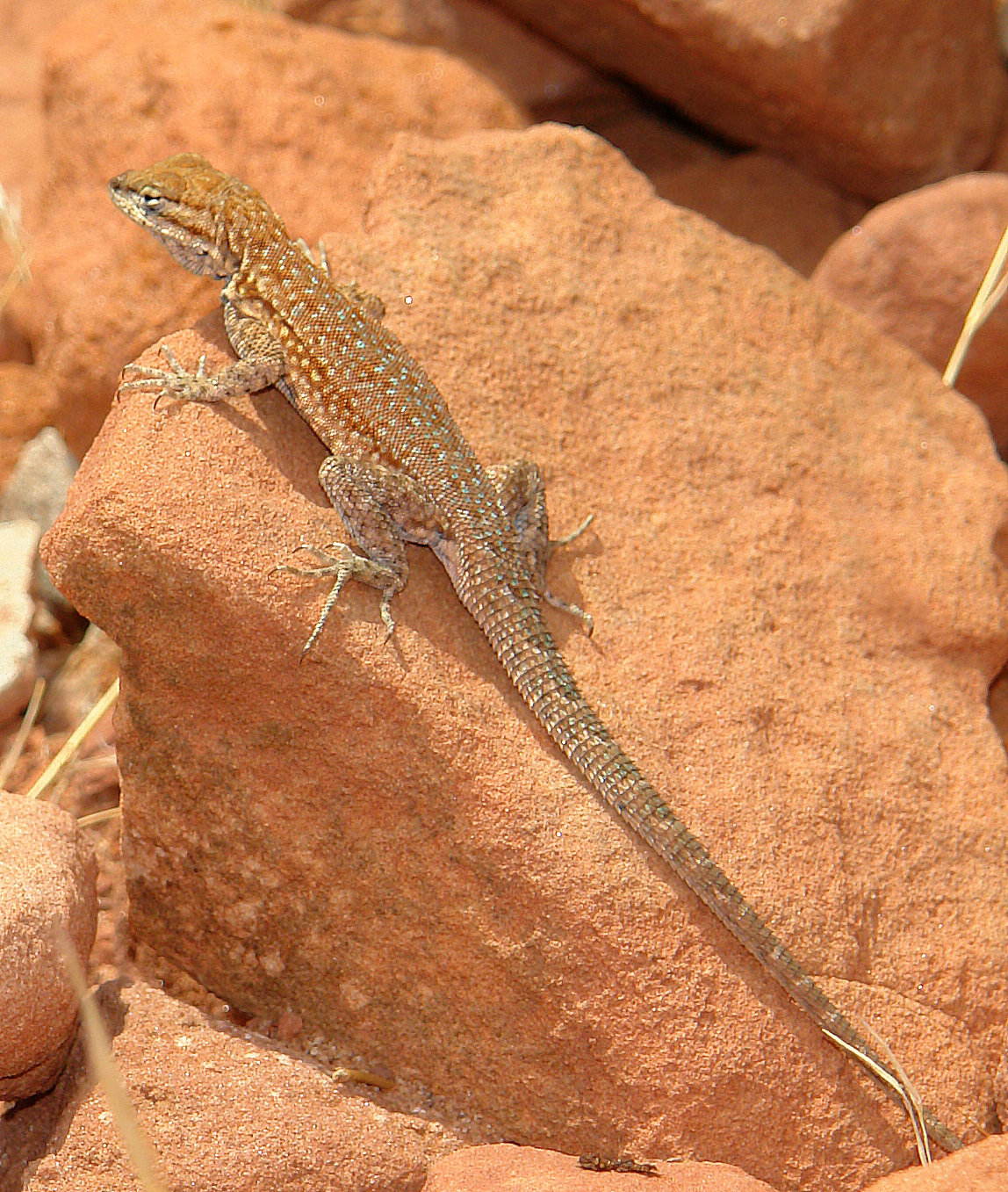
Sagebrush lizard (Sceloporus graciosus)

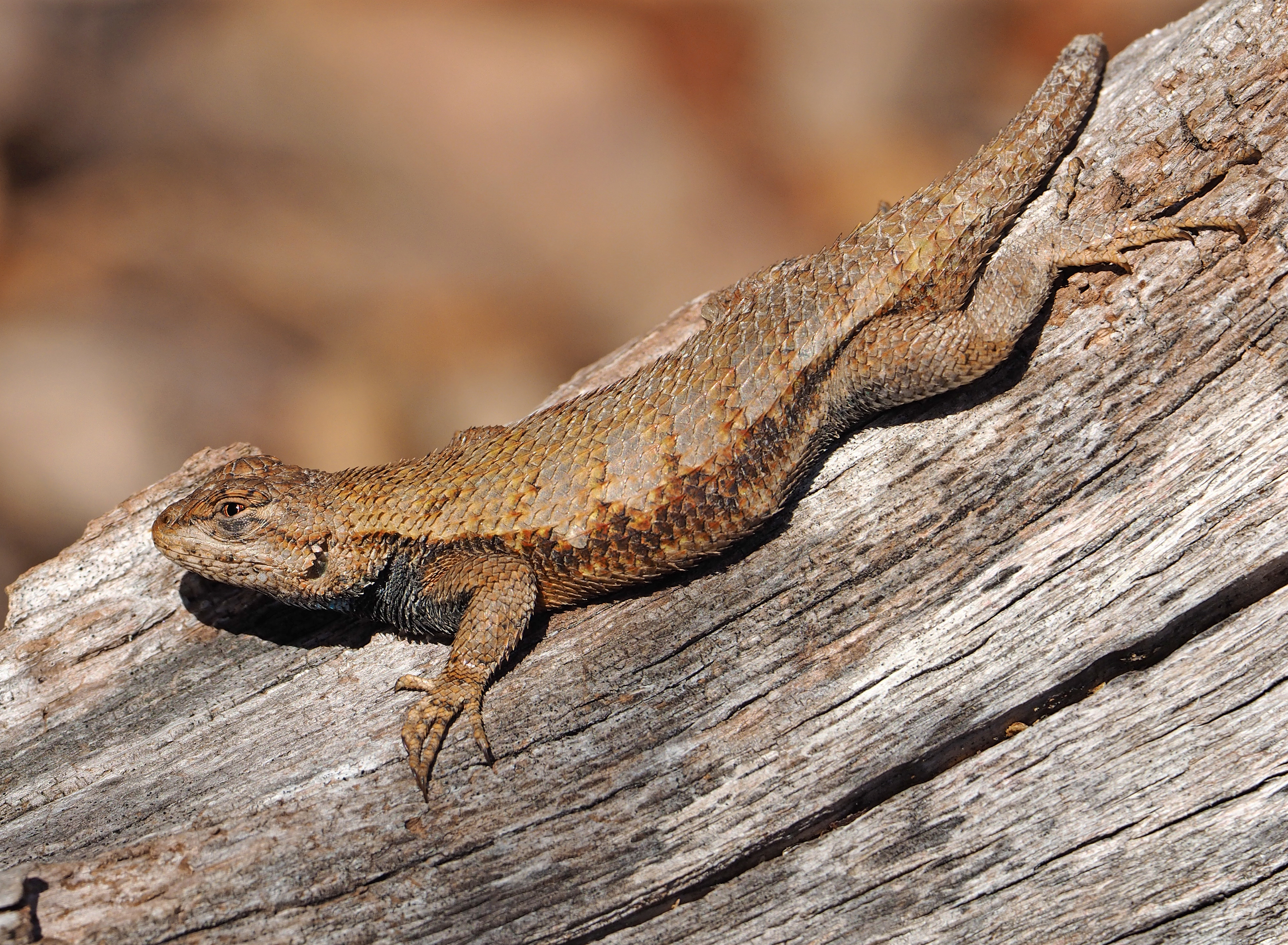
Eastern fence lizard (Sceloporus undulatus)

== Salamanders ==
Two species of salamanders, both from family Ambystomidae, are native to Nebraska.

- Small-mouth salamander
- Tiger salamander
Native salamanders
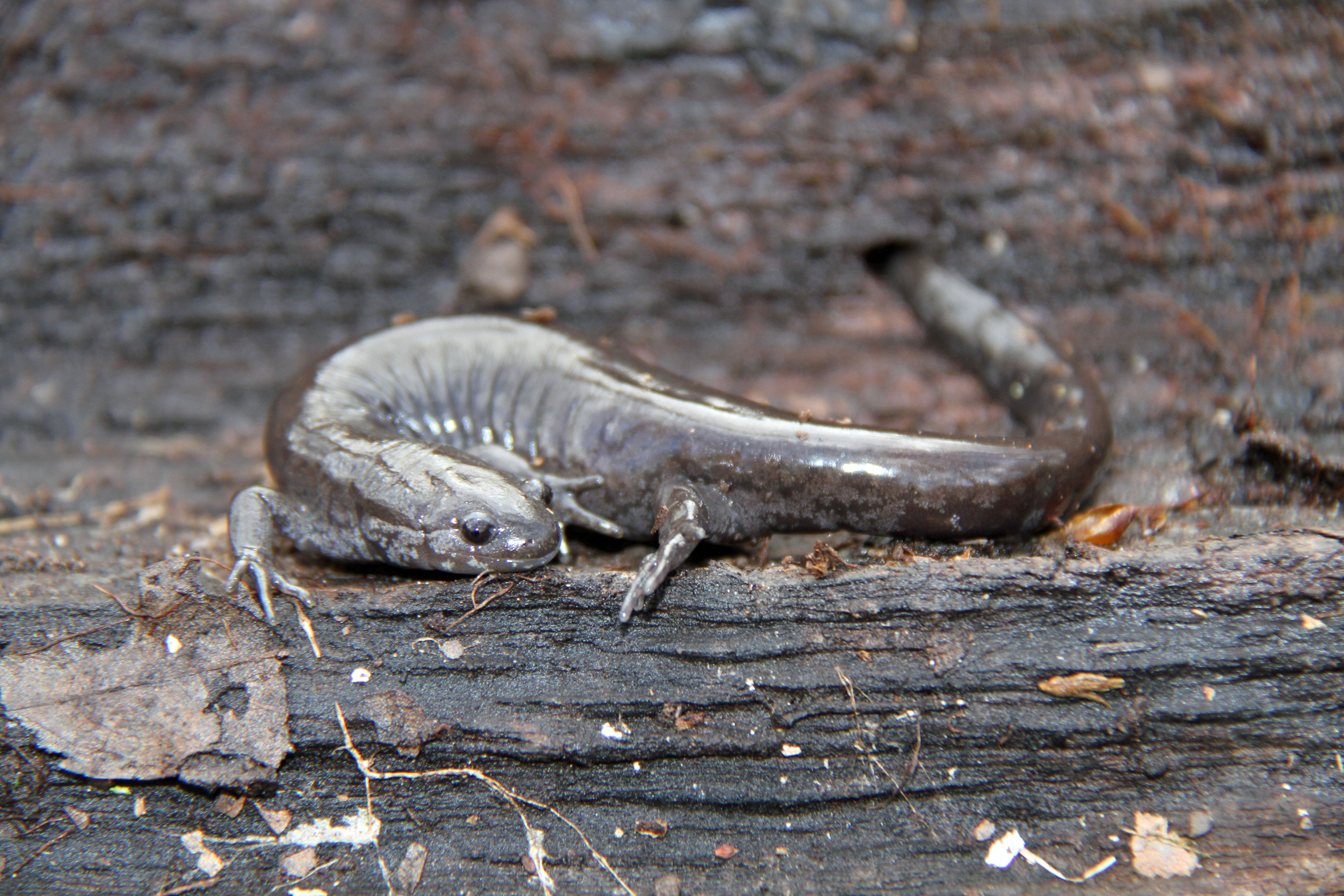
Small-mouth salamander (Ambystoma texanum)

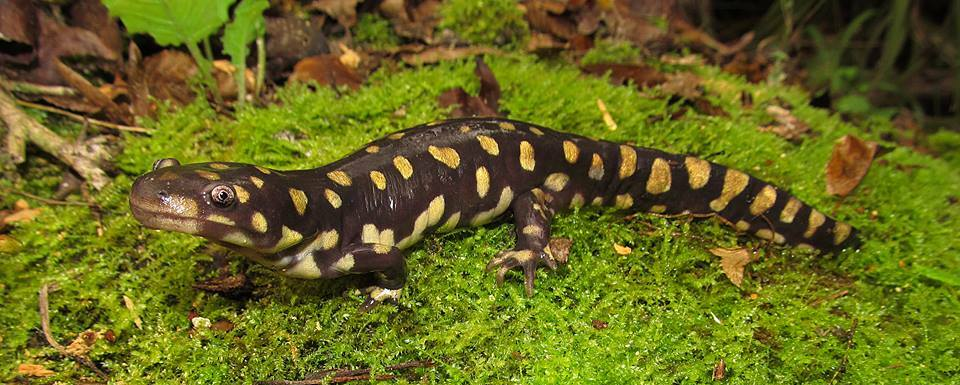
Tiger salamander (Ambystoma tigrinum)

== Snakes ==
Twenty-five species of non-venomous snakes (Colubridae) and four species of venomous snakes (Viperidae) are native to Nebraska.

=== Non-venomous ===
- Black rat snake
- Bullsnake
- Coachwhip snake
- Common garter snake
- Common water snake
- Dekay's brownsnake
- Eastern hog-nosed snake
- Fox snake
- Glossy snake
- Graham's crayfish snake
- Great Plains ratsnake
- Lined snake
- North American racer
- Plains black-headed snake
- Plains garter snake
- Plains hog-nosed snake
- Prairie kingsnake
- Red-bellied snake
- Ring-necked snake
- Smooth green snake
- Speckled kingsnake
- Western milk snake
- Western ribbon snake
- Western terrestrial garter snake
- Western worm snake
Native non-venomous snakes
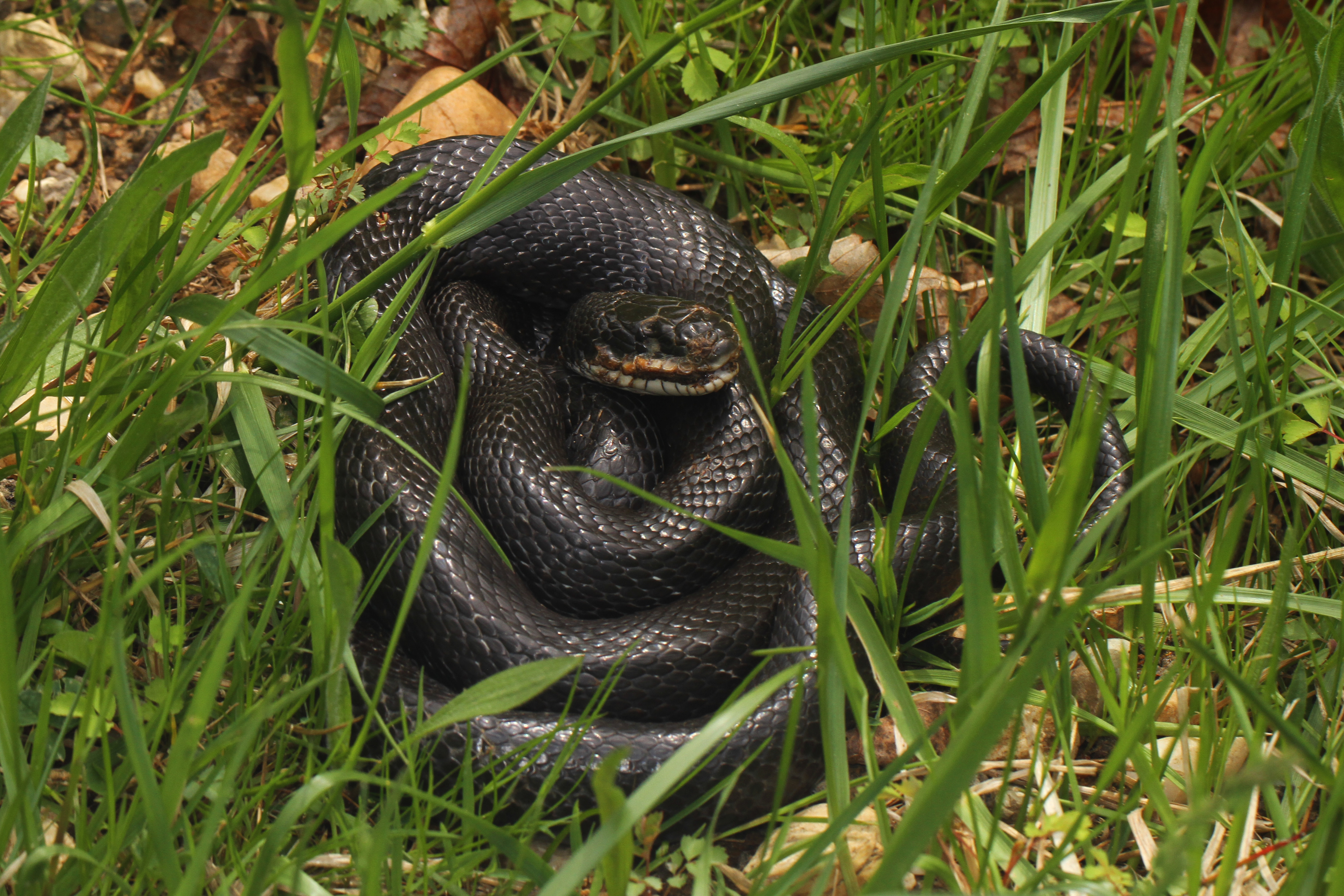
Black rat snake (Pantherophis obsoletus)

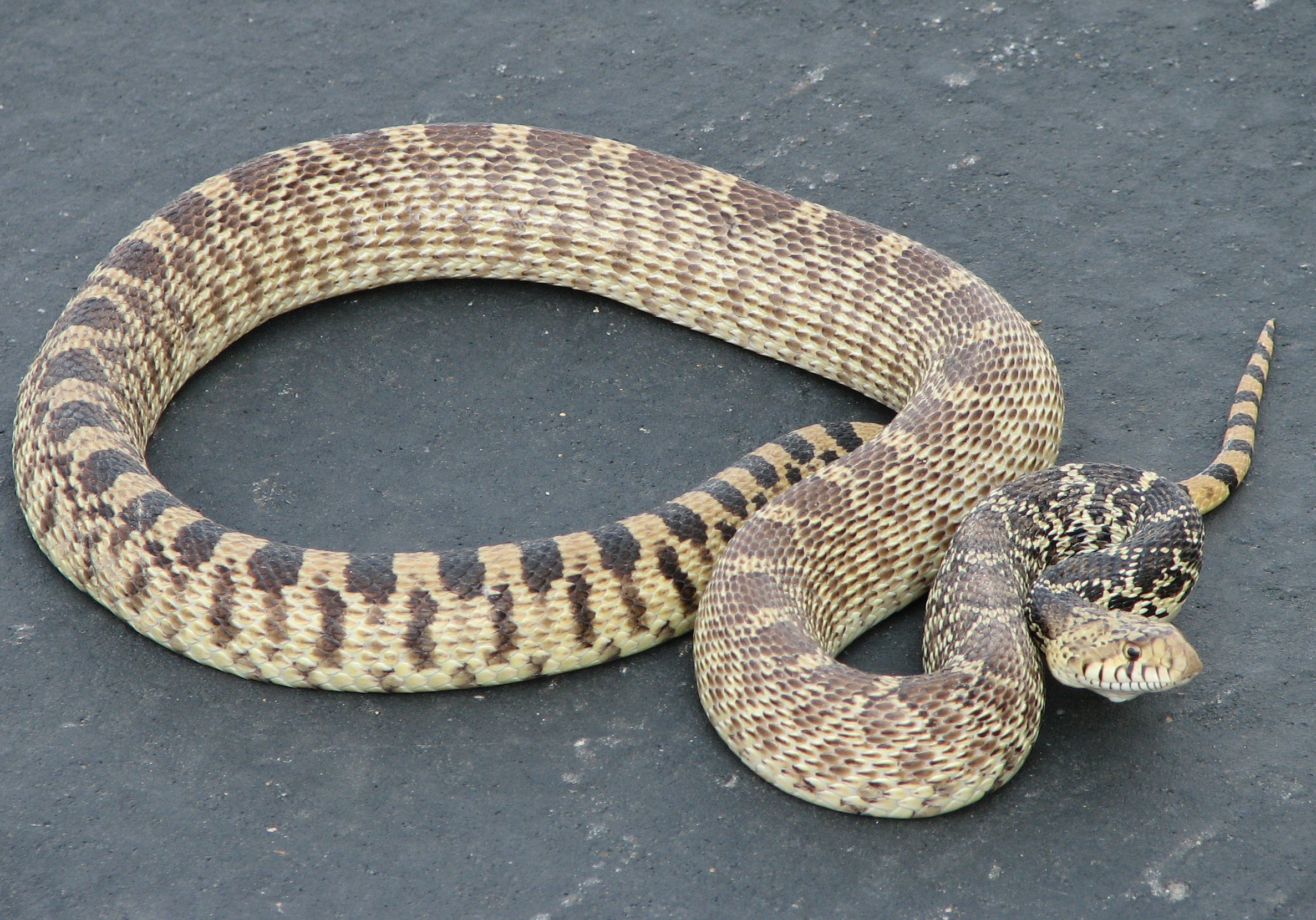
Bullsnake (Pituophis catenifer)

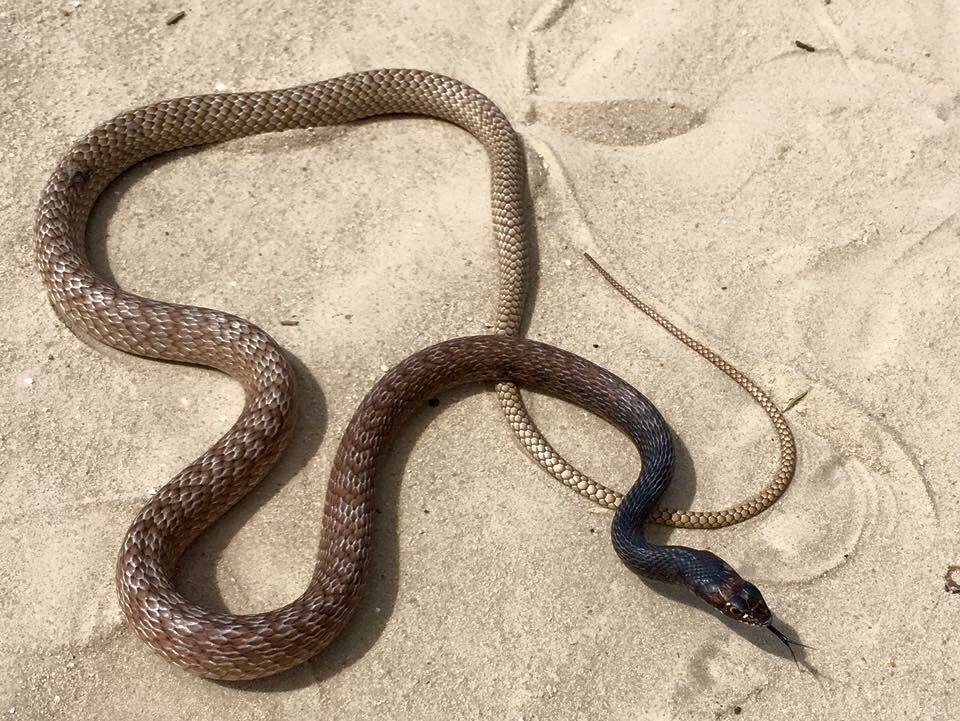
Coachwhip snake (Masticophis flagellum)

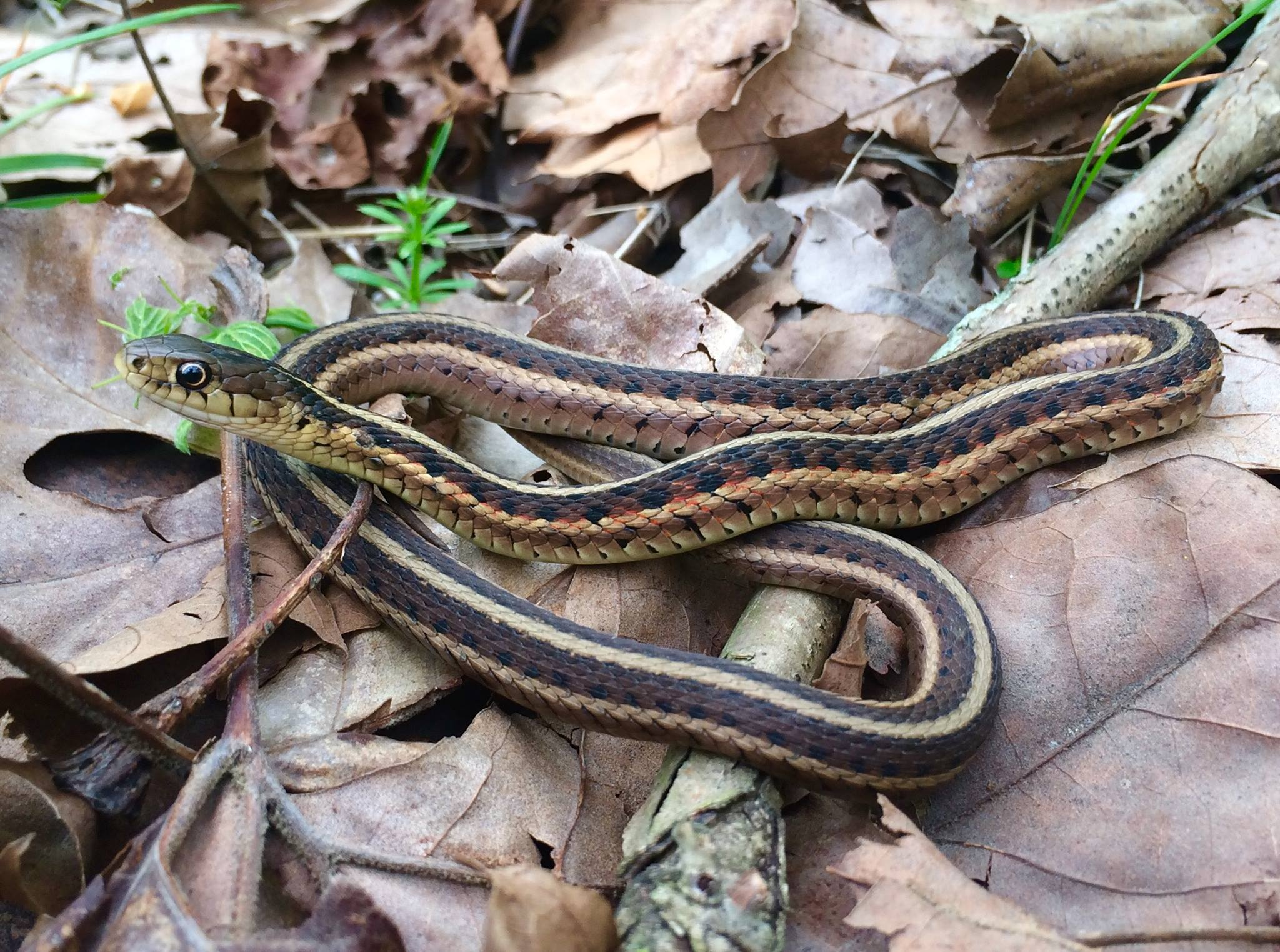
Common garter snake (Thamnophis sirtalis)

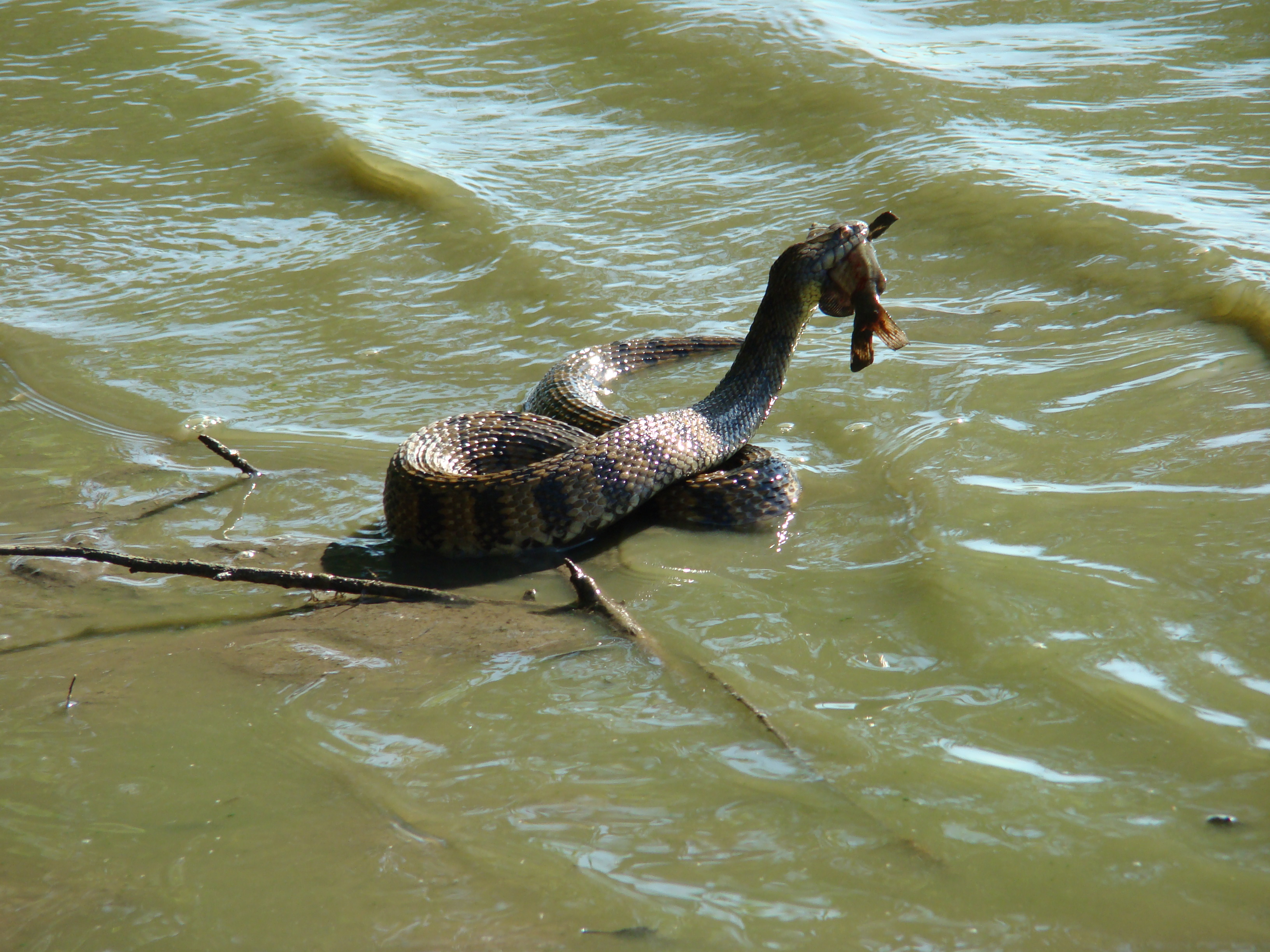
Common water snake (Nerodia sipedon)

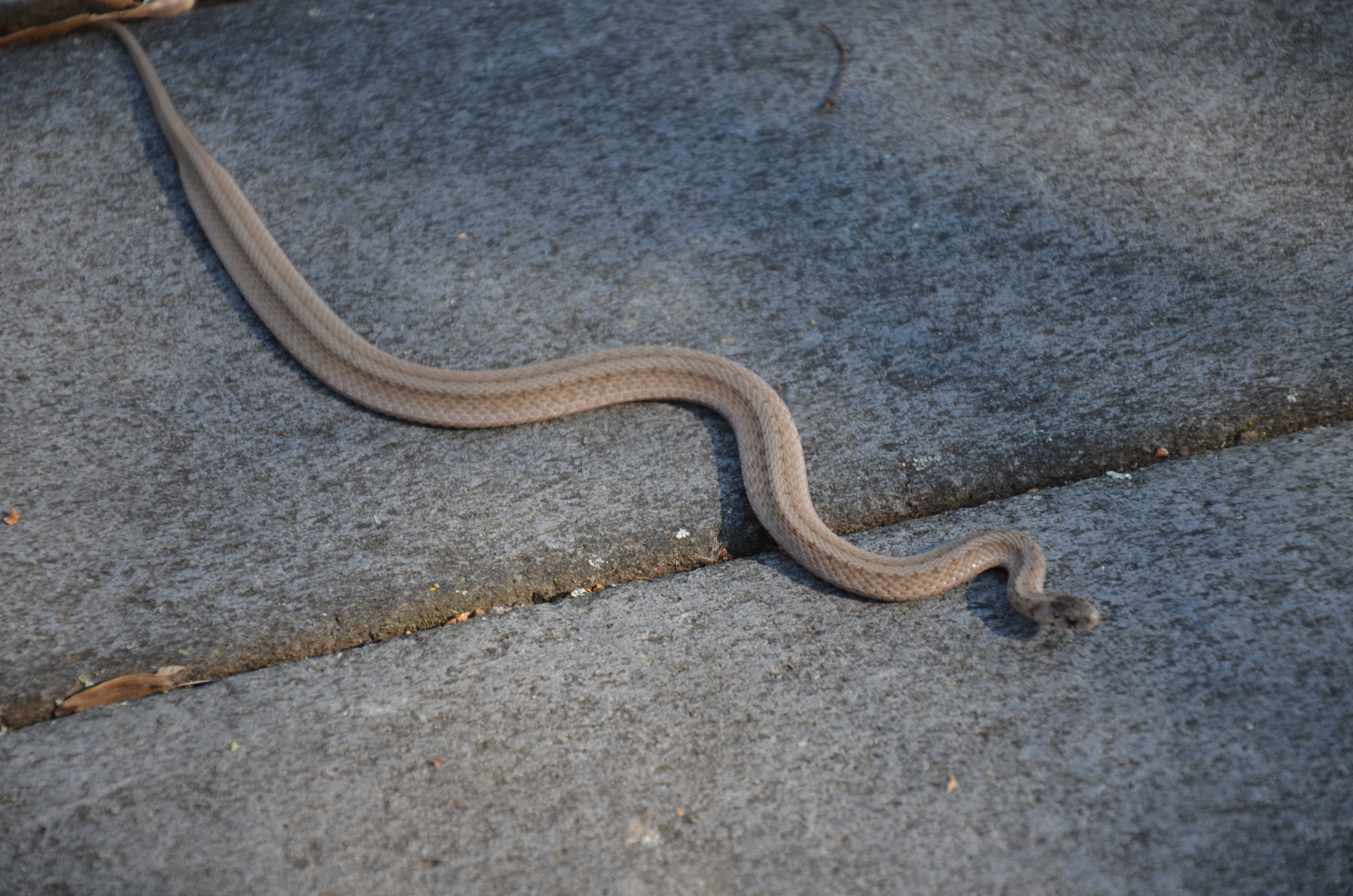
Dekay's brownsnake (Storeria dekayi)

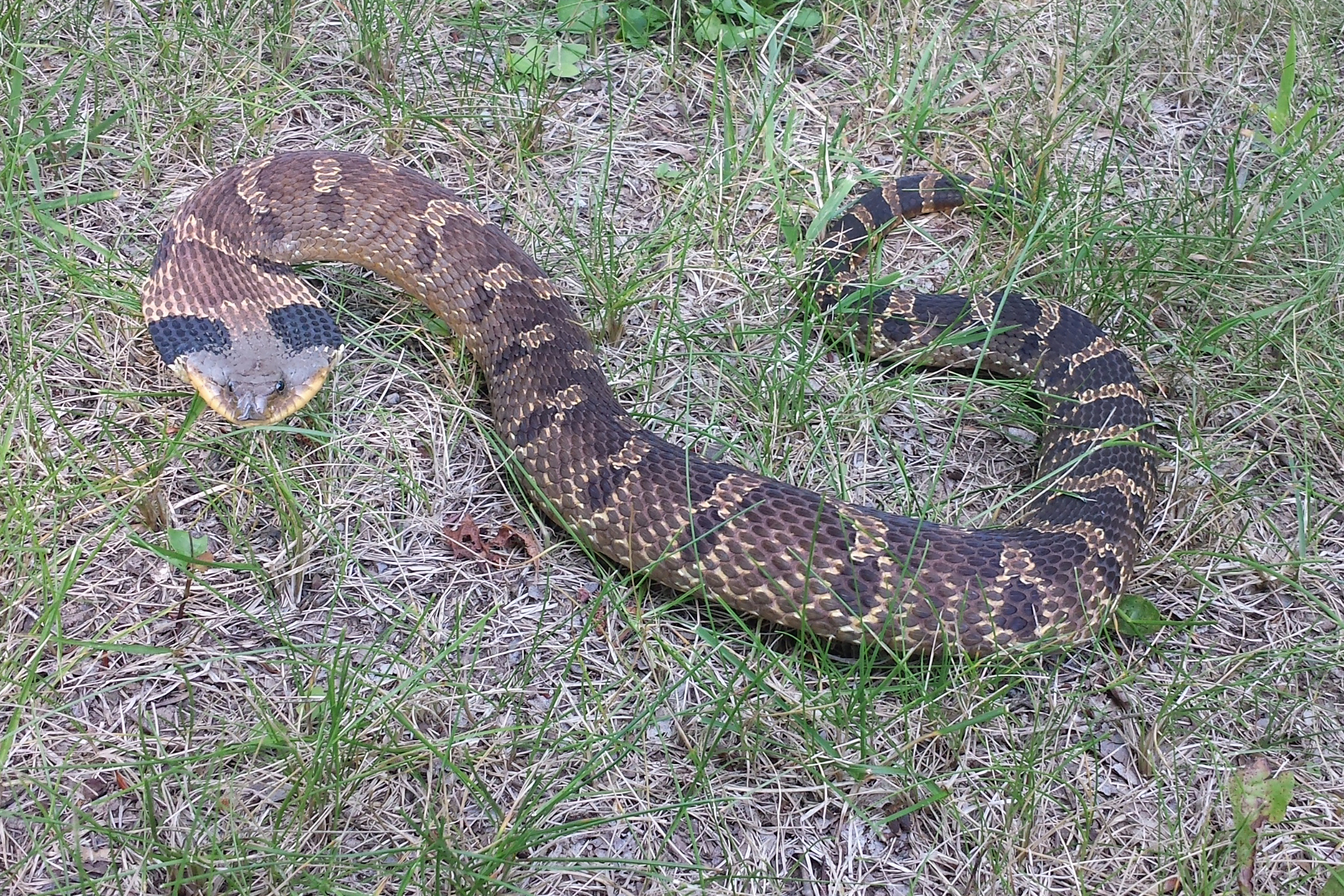
Eastern hog-nosed snake (Heterodon platirhinos)

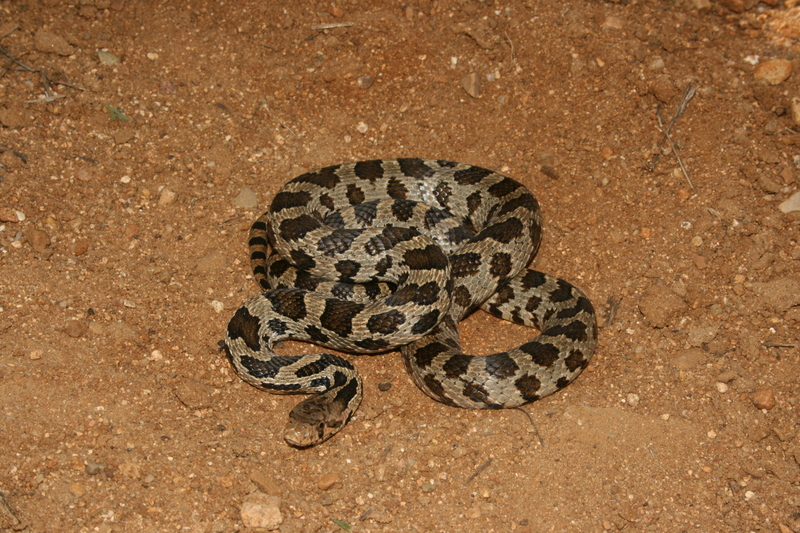
Fox snake (Pantherophis vulpinus)

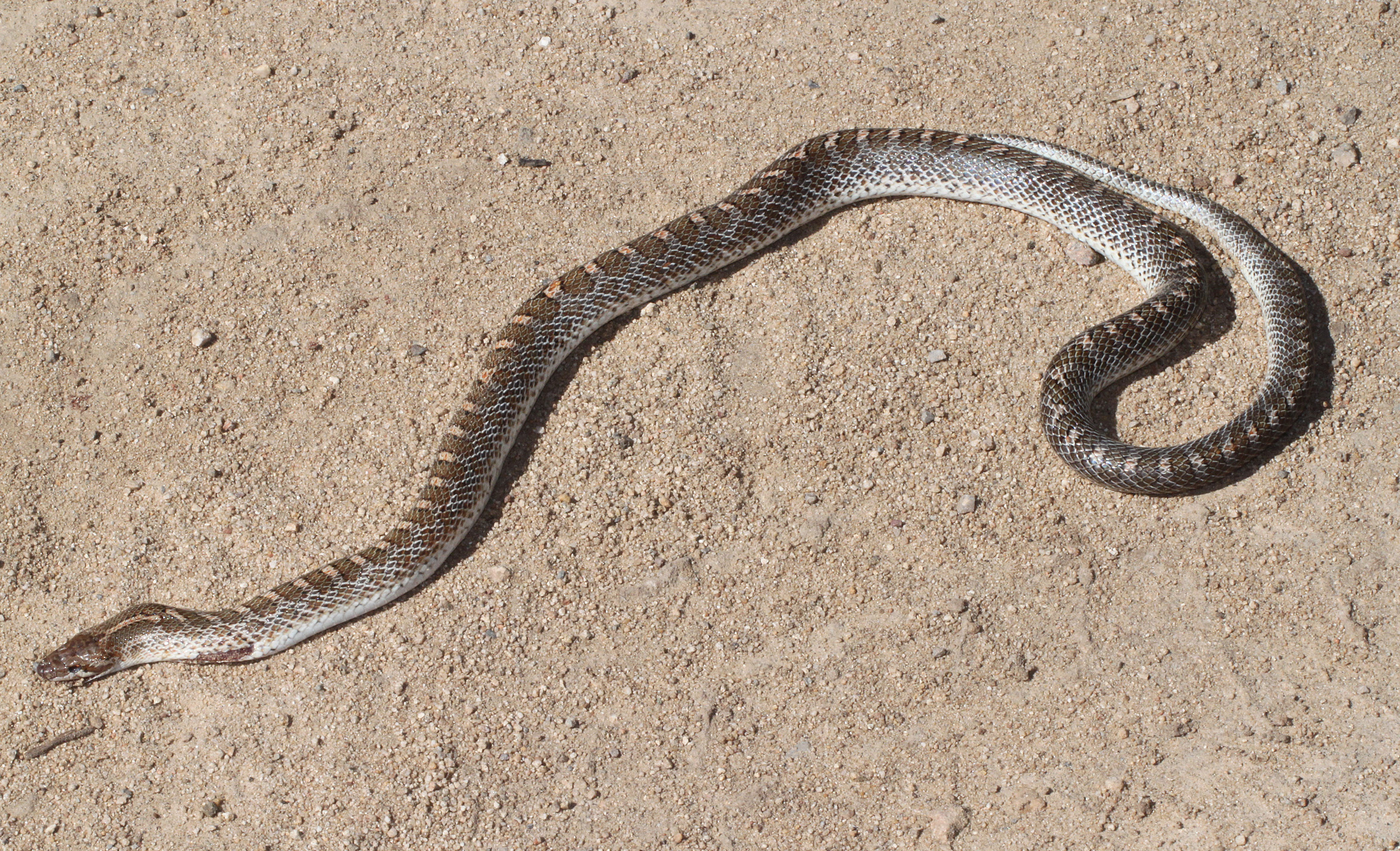
Glossy snake (Arizona elegans)

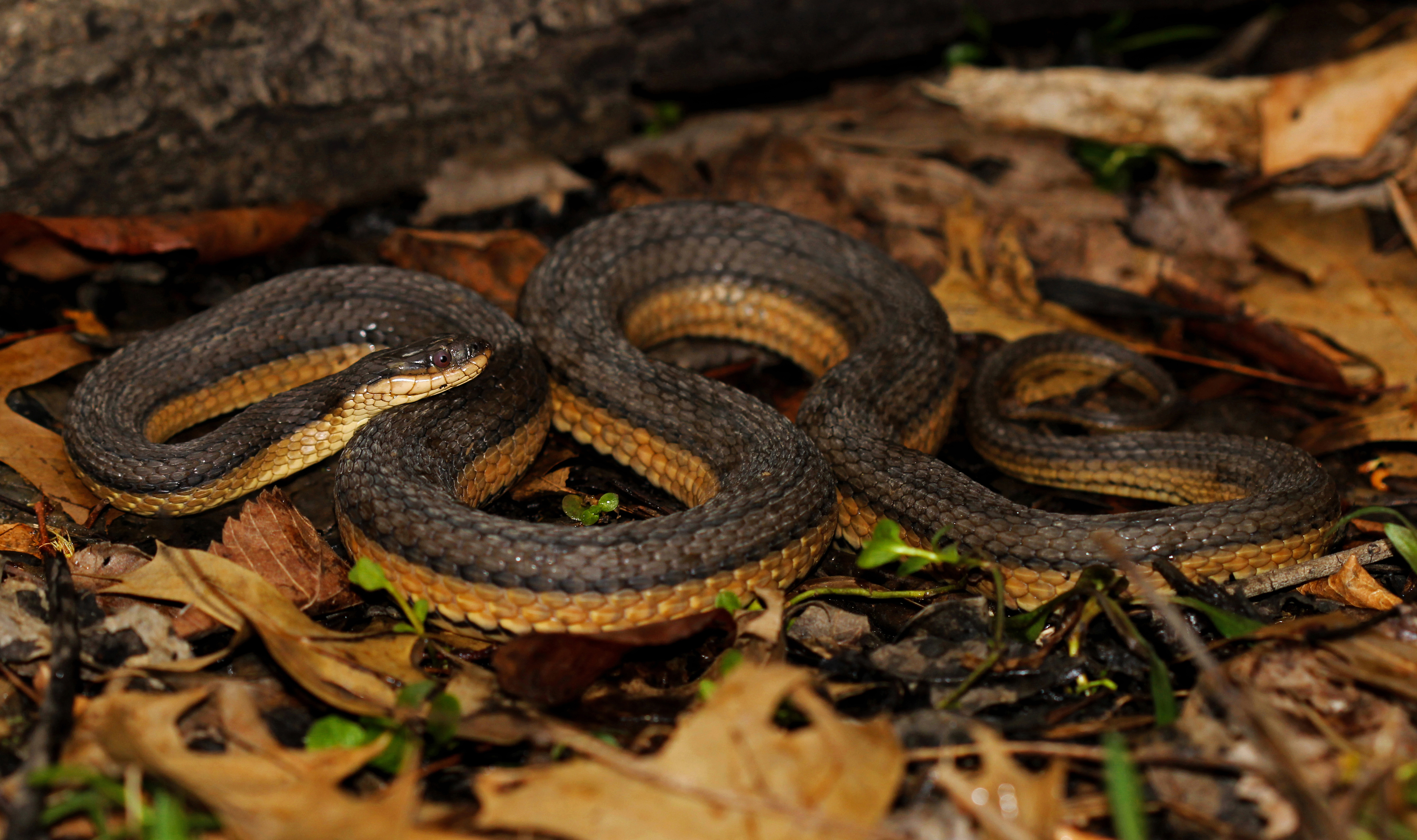
Graham's crayfish snake (Regina grahamii)

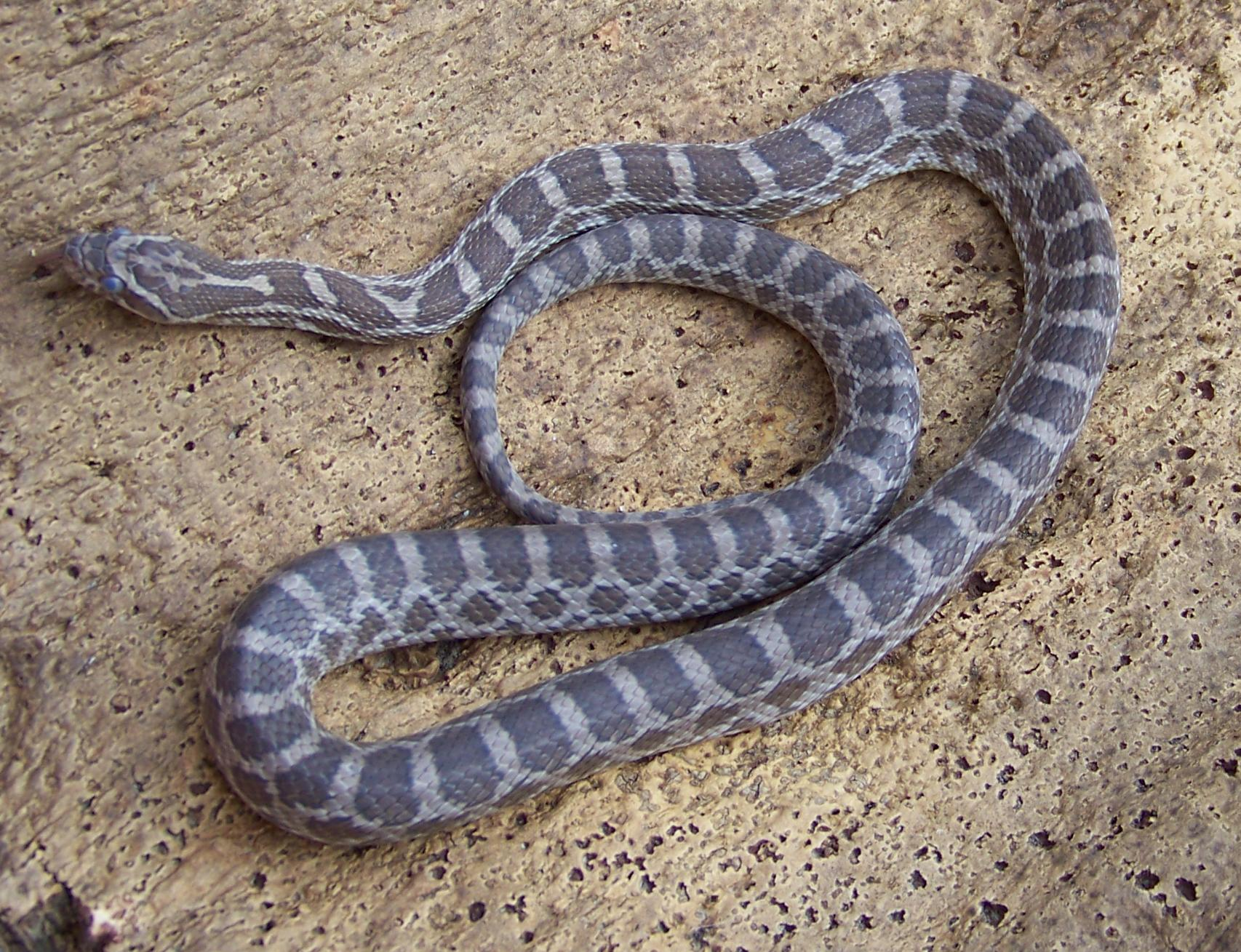
Great Plains ratsnake (Pantherophis emoryi)

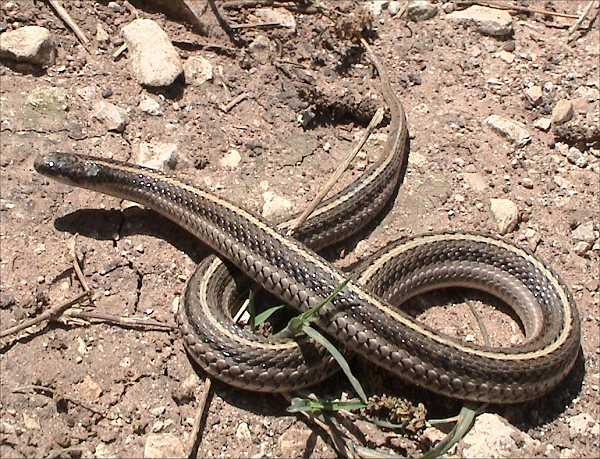
Lined snake (Tropidoclonion lineatum)

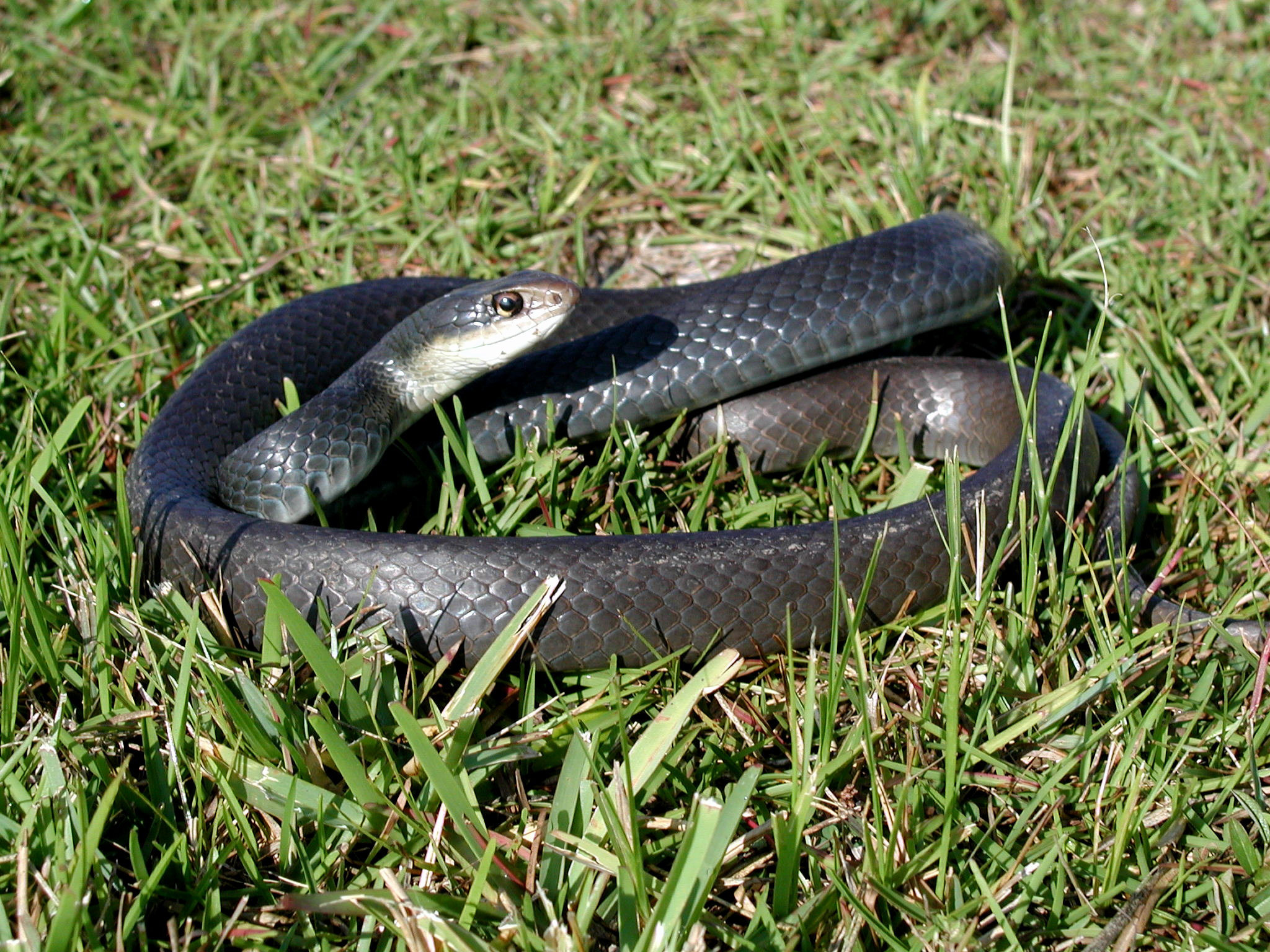
North American racer (Coluber constrictor)

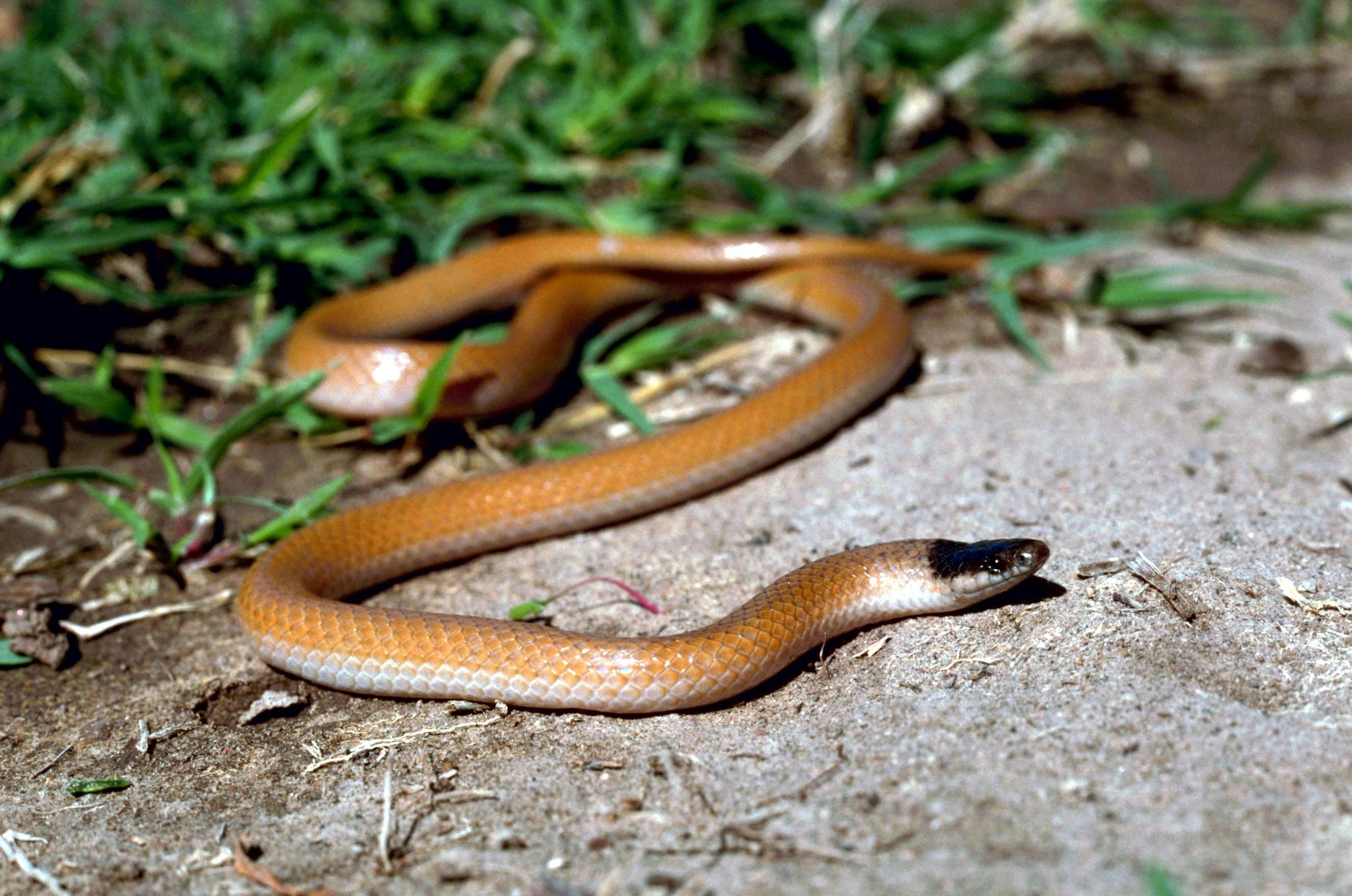
Plains black-headed snake (Tantilla nigriceps)

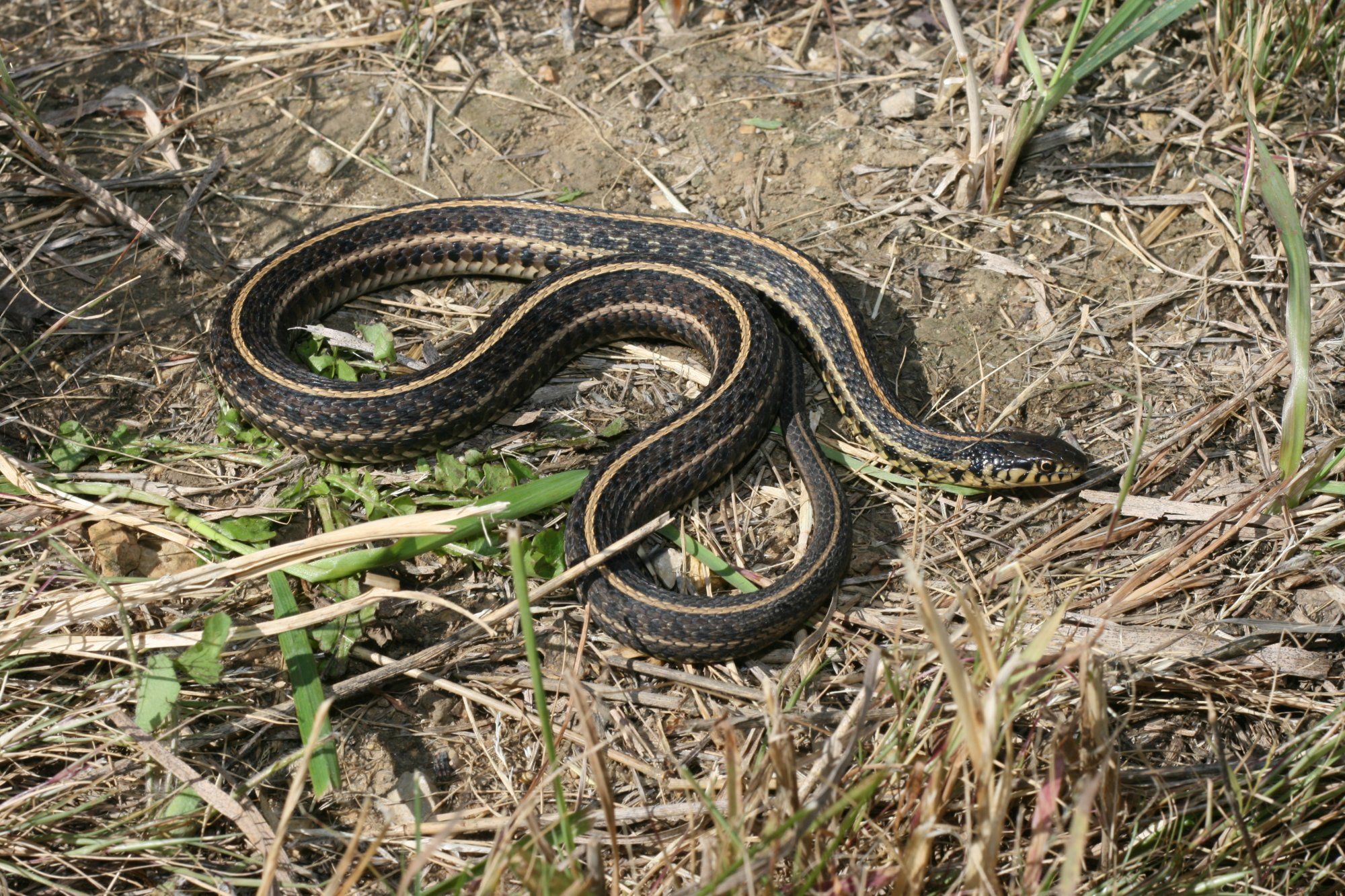
Plains garter snake (Thamnophis radix)

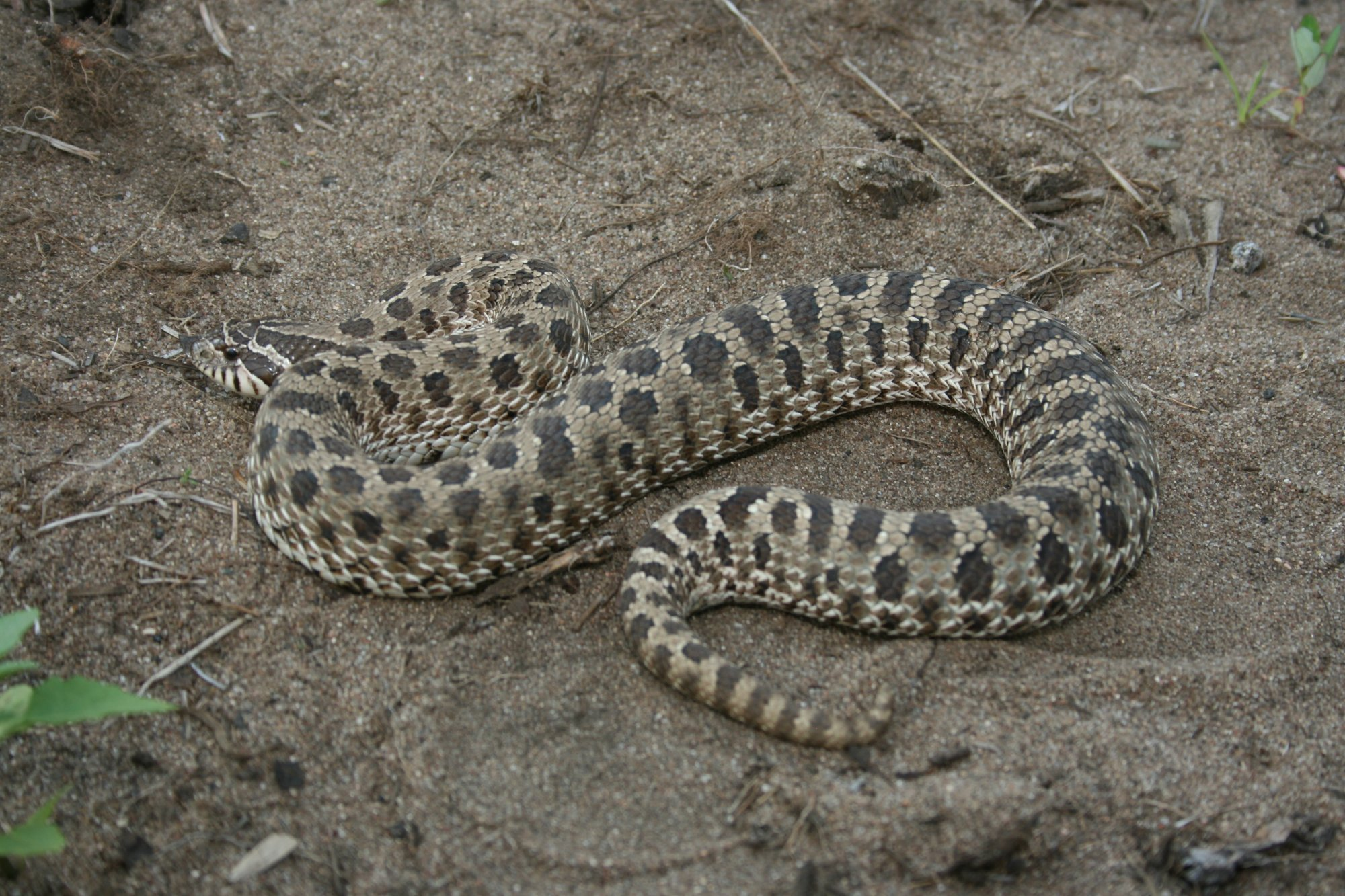
Plains hog-nosed snake (Heterodon nasicus)

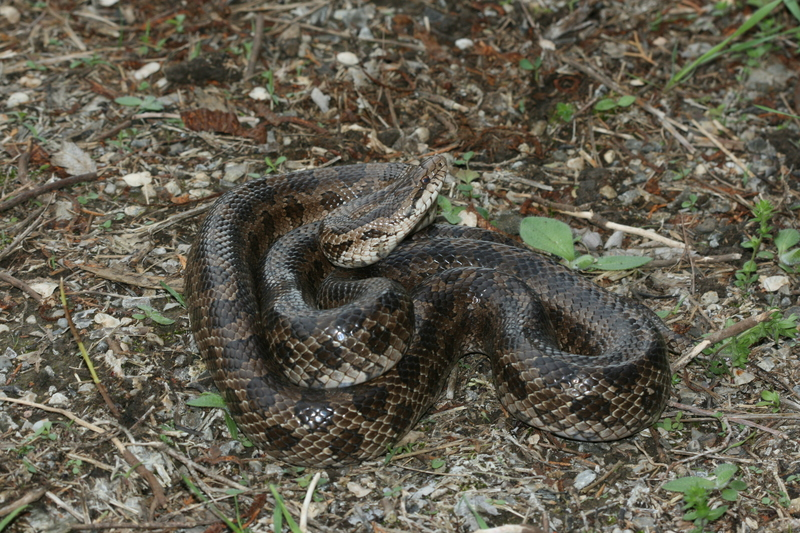
Prairie kingsnake (Lampropeltis calligaster)

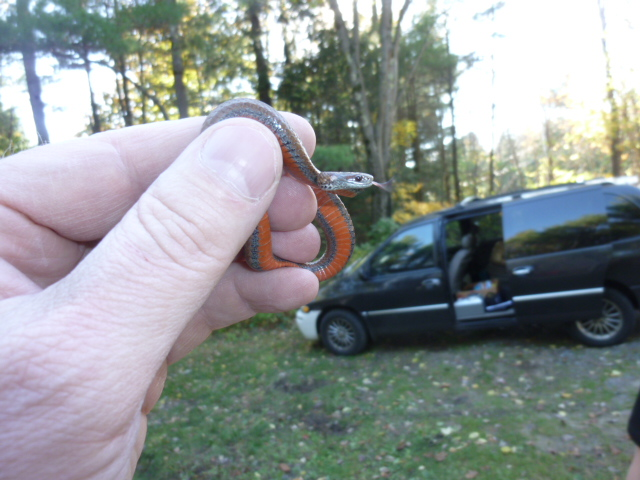
Northern redbelly snake (Storeria occipitomaculata)

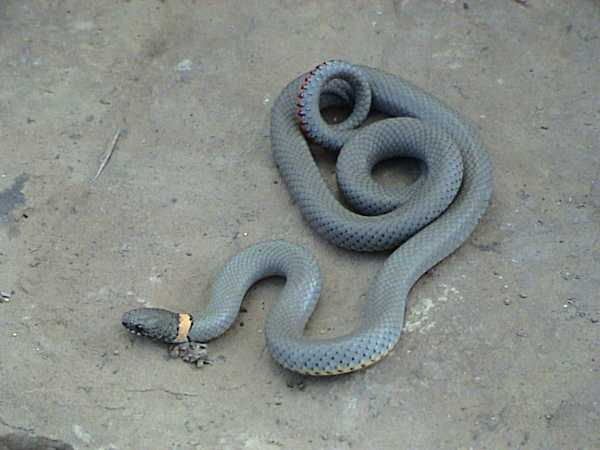
Ring-necked snake (Diadophis punctatus)

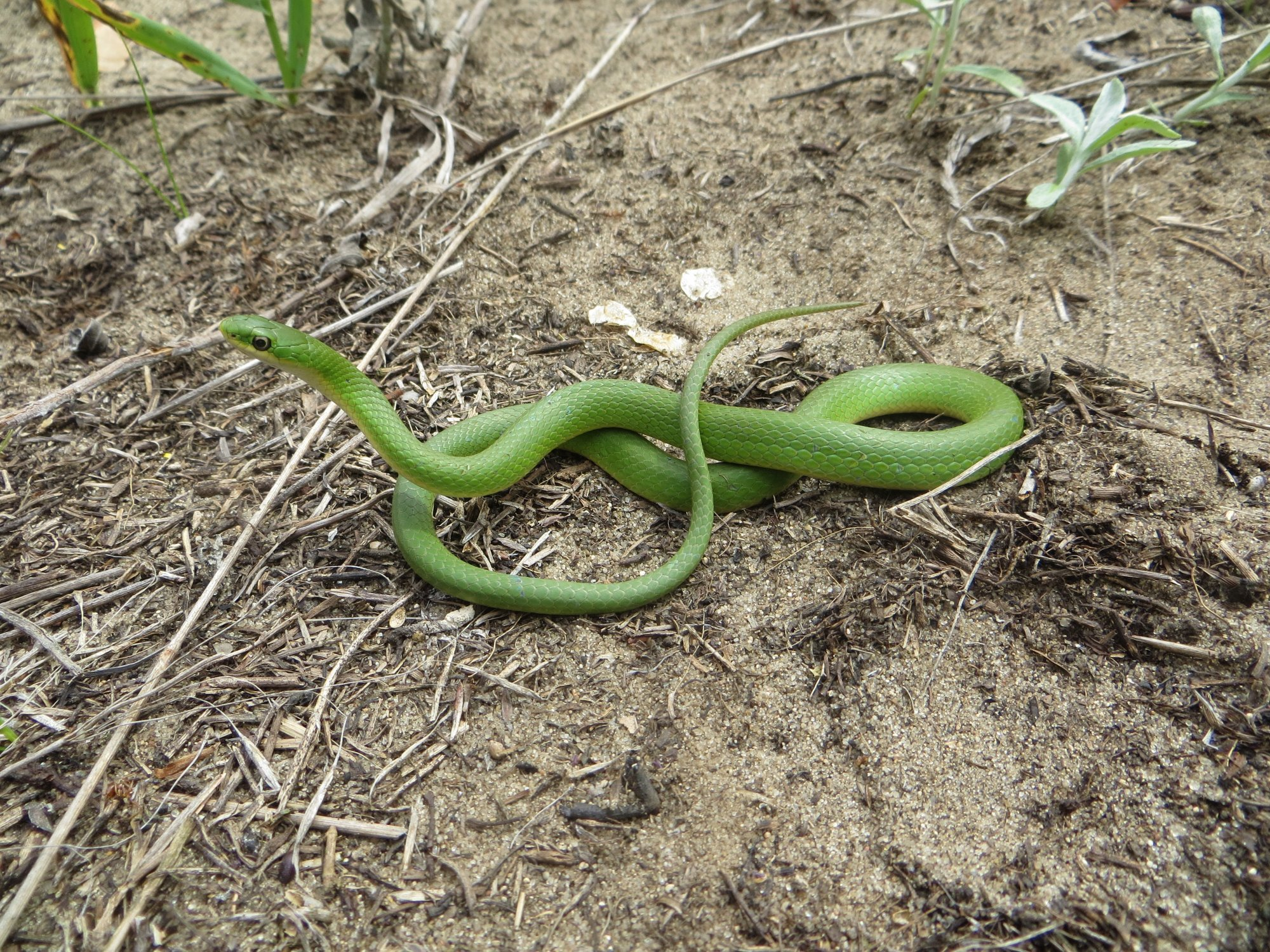
Smooth green snake (Opheodrys vernalis)

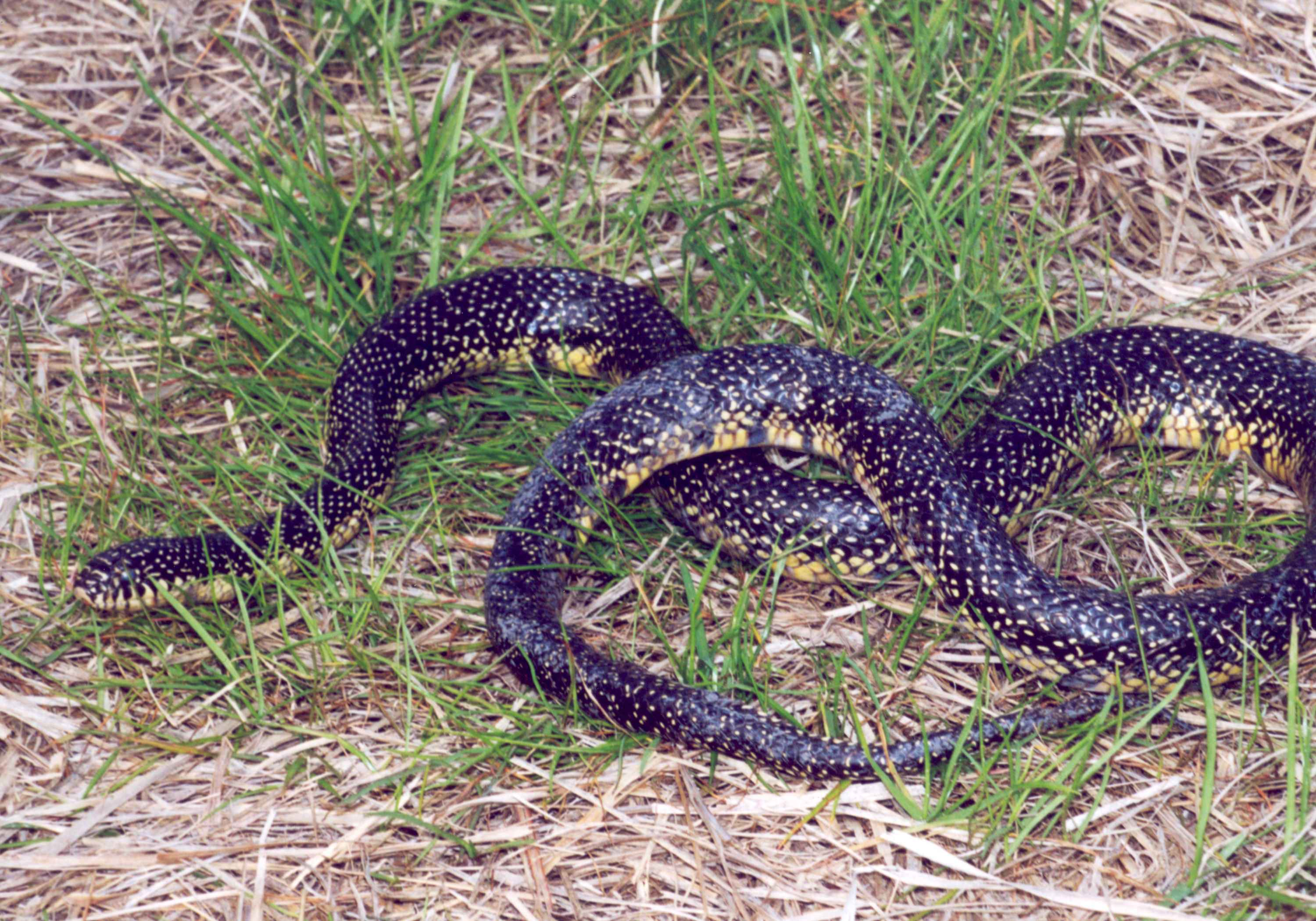
Speckled kingsnake (Lampropeltis holbrooki)

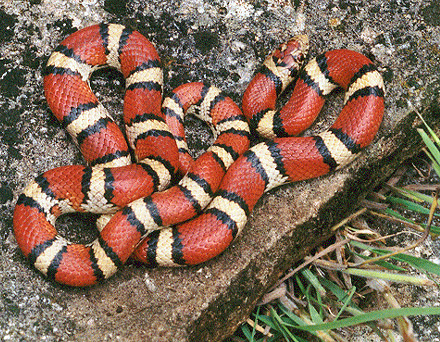
Western milksnake (Lampropeltis triangulum)

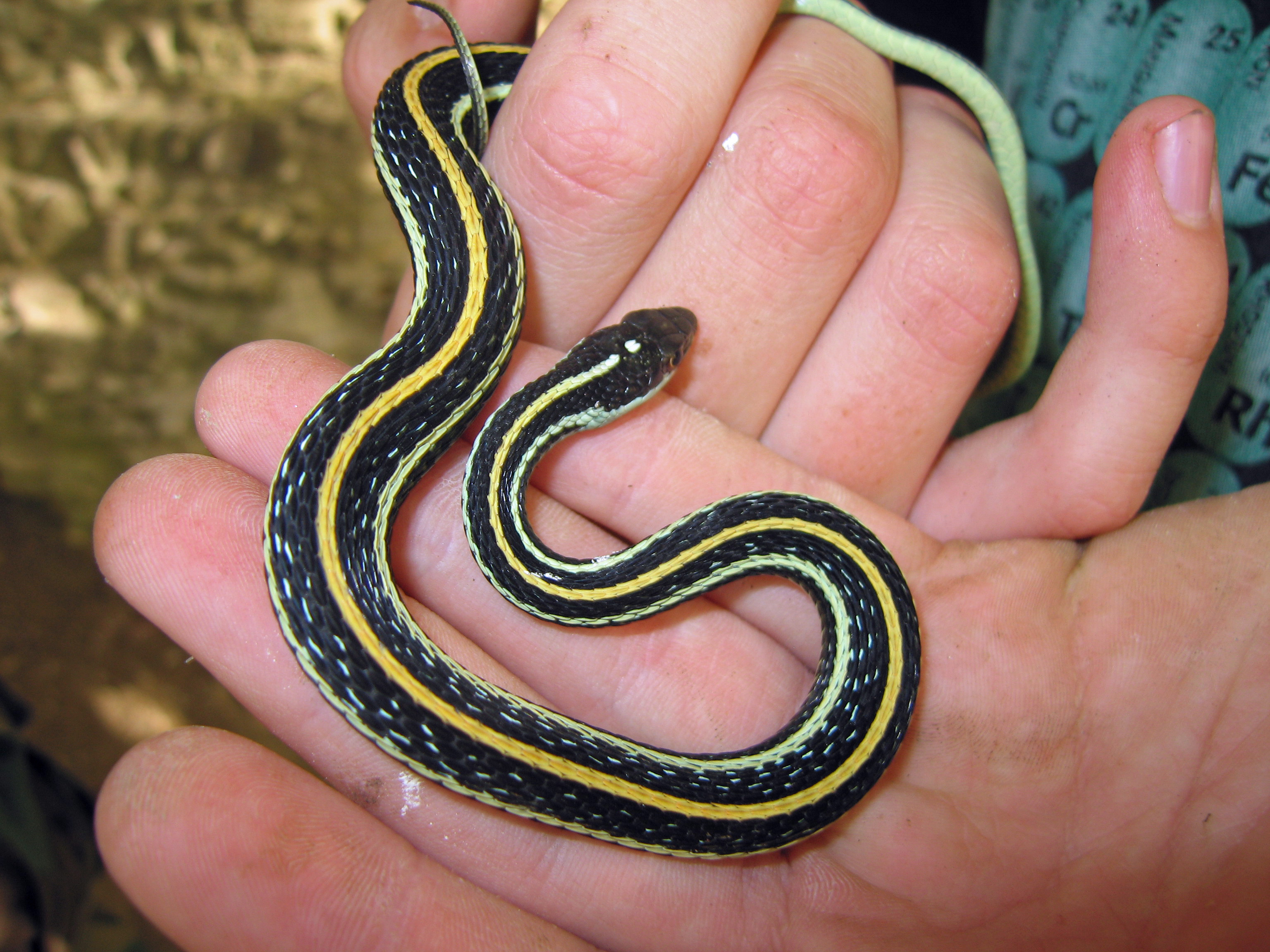
Western ribbon snake (Thamnophis proximus)

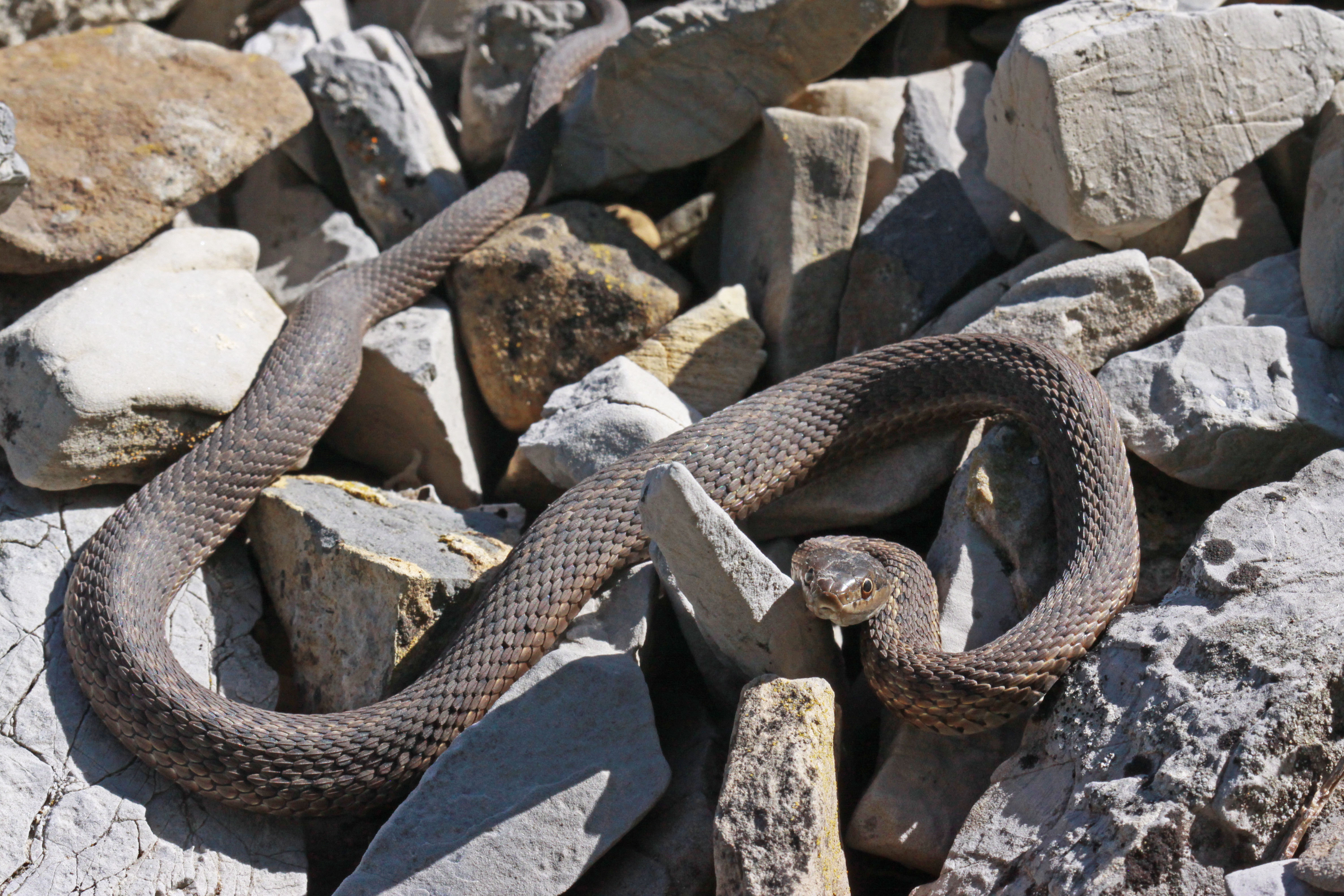
Western terrestrial garter snake (Thamnophis elegans)

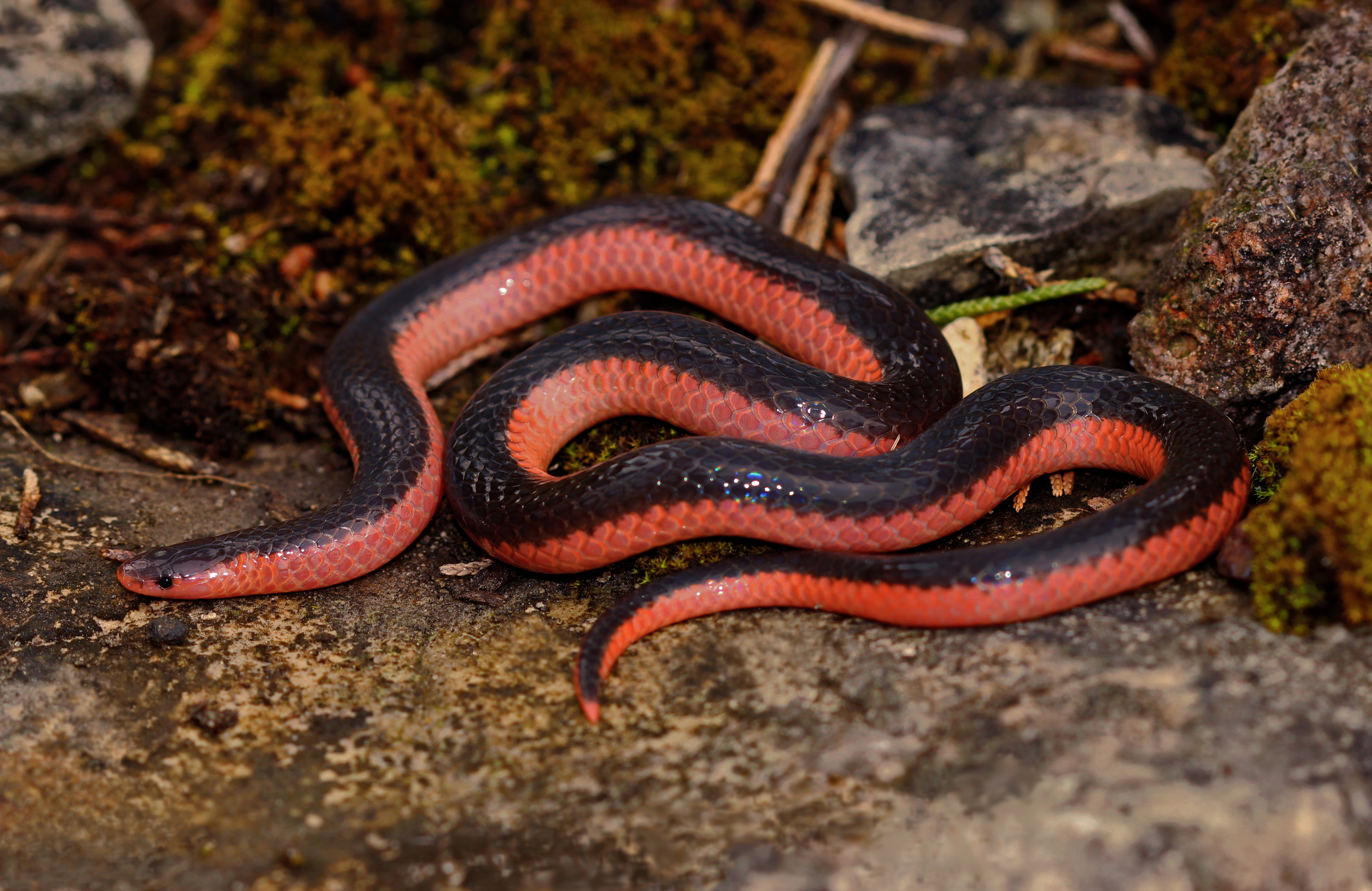
Western worm snake (Carphophis vermis)

=== Venomous ===
- Eastern copperhead
- Massasauga
- Prairie rattlesnake
- Timber rattlesnake
Native venomous snakes
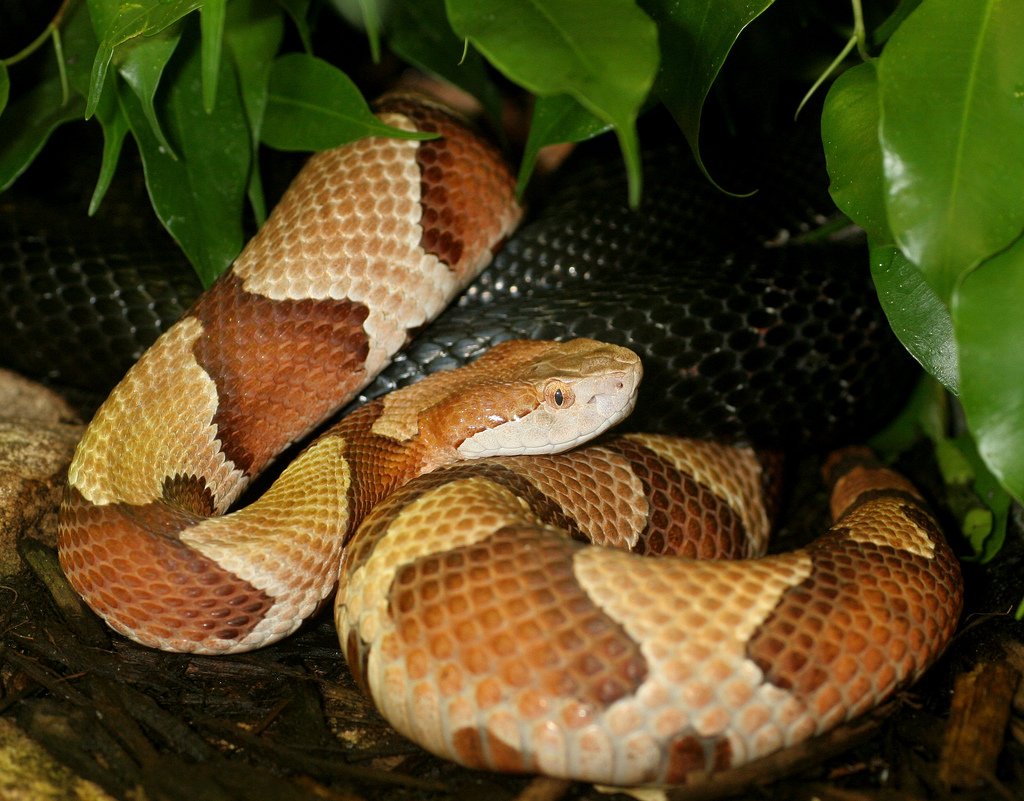
Eastern copperhead (Agkistrodon contortrix)

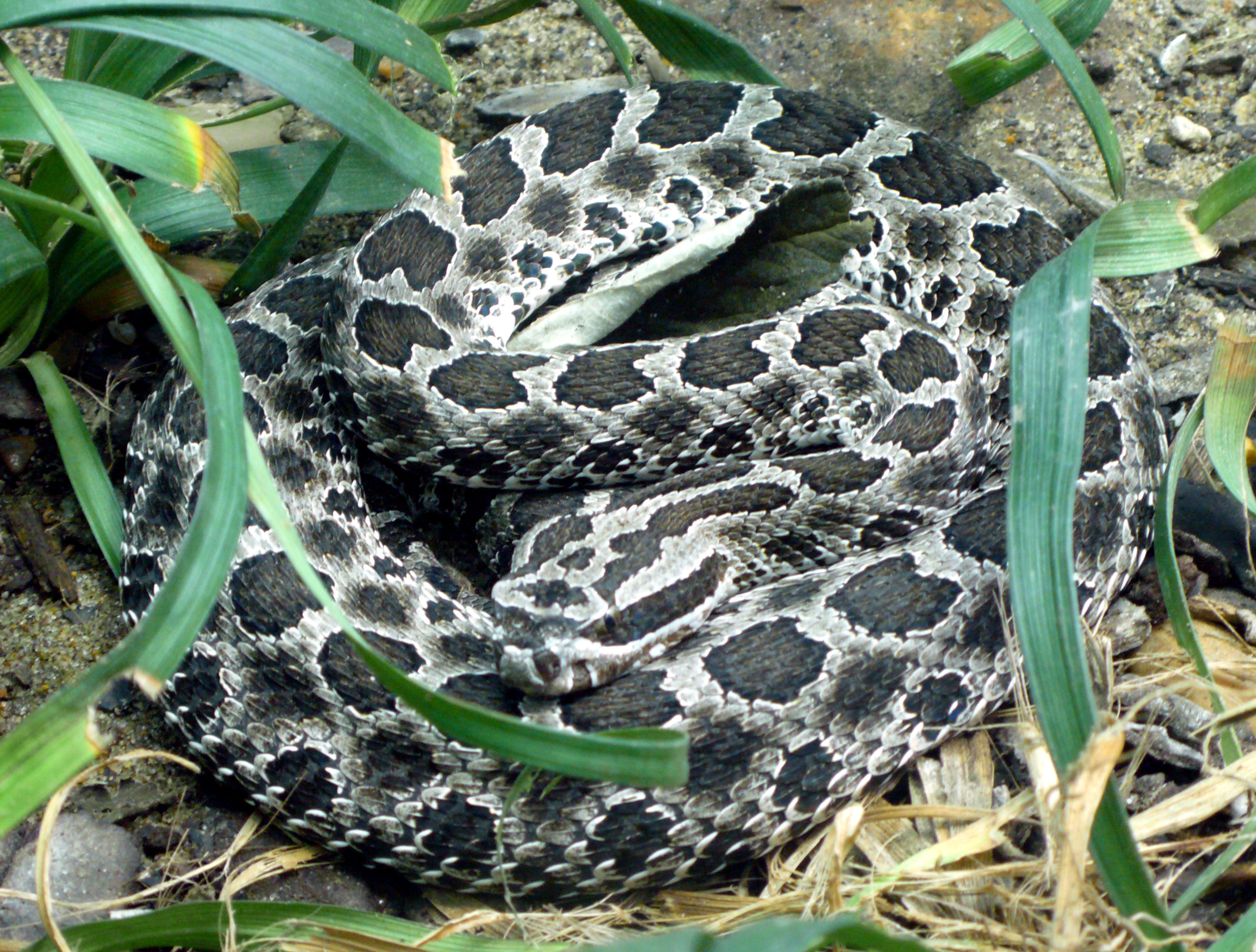
Massasauga (Sisturus catenatus)

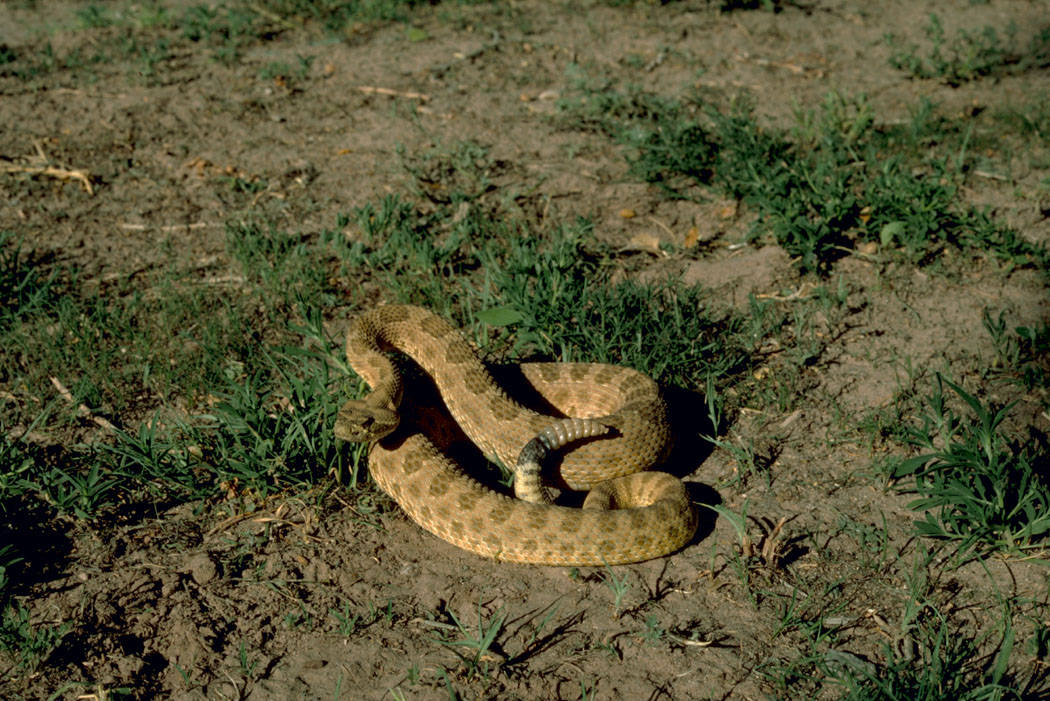
Prairie rattlesnake (Crotalus viridis)

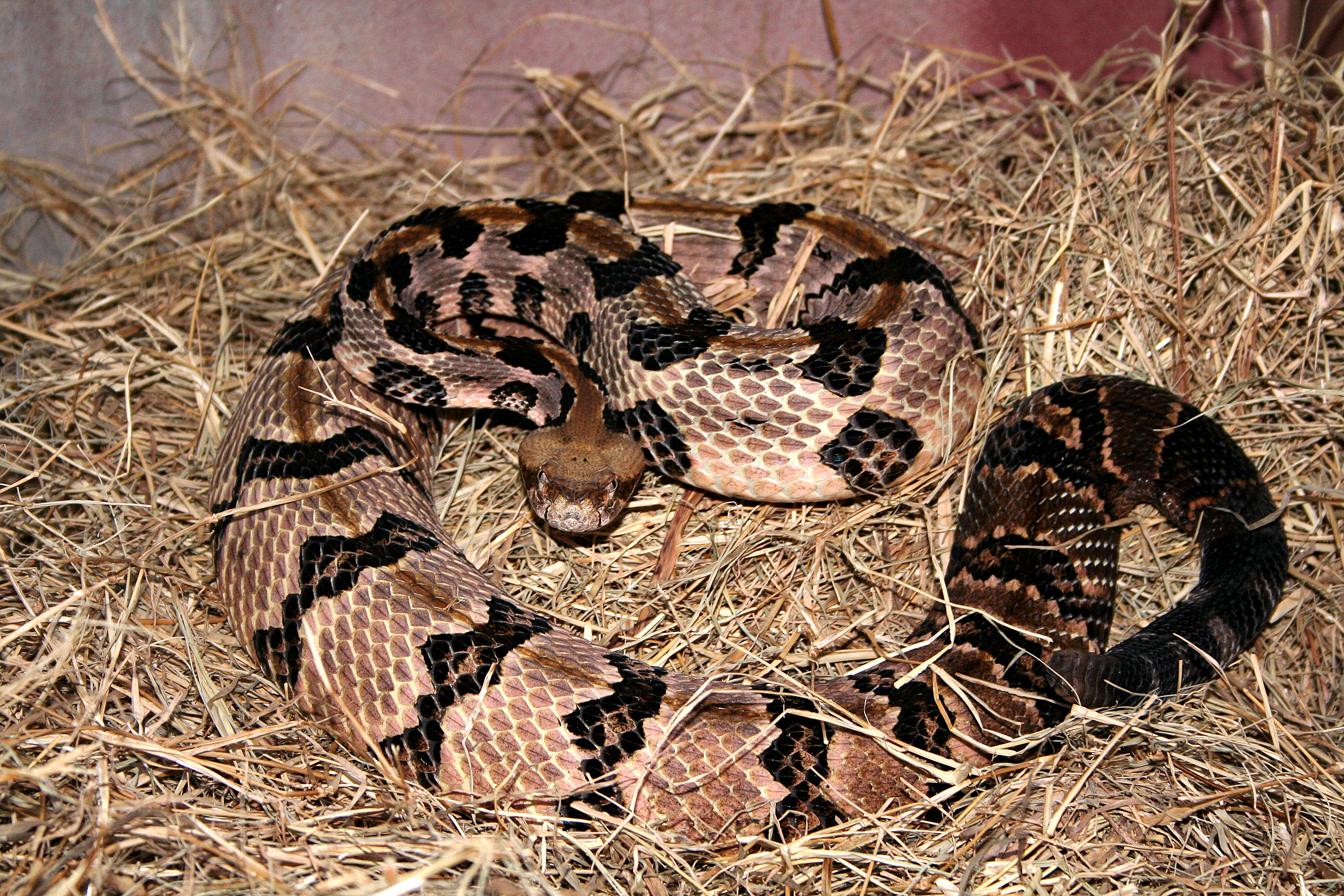
Timber rattlesnake (Crotalus horridus)

== Turtles ==
Eight species of turtles from four families, (Chelydridae, Emydidae, Kinosternidae, and Trionychidae), are native to Nebraska.

- Blanding's turtle
- Common snapping turtle
- False map turtle
- Ornate box turtle
- Painted turtle
- Smooth softshell turtle
- Spiny softshell turtle
- Yellow mud turtle
Native turtles
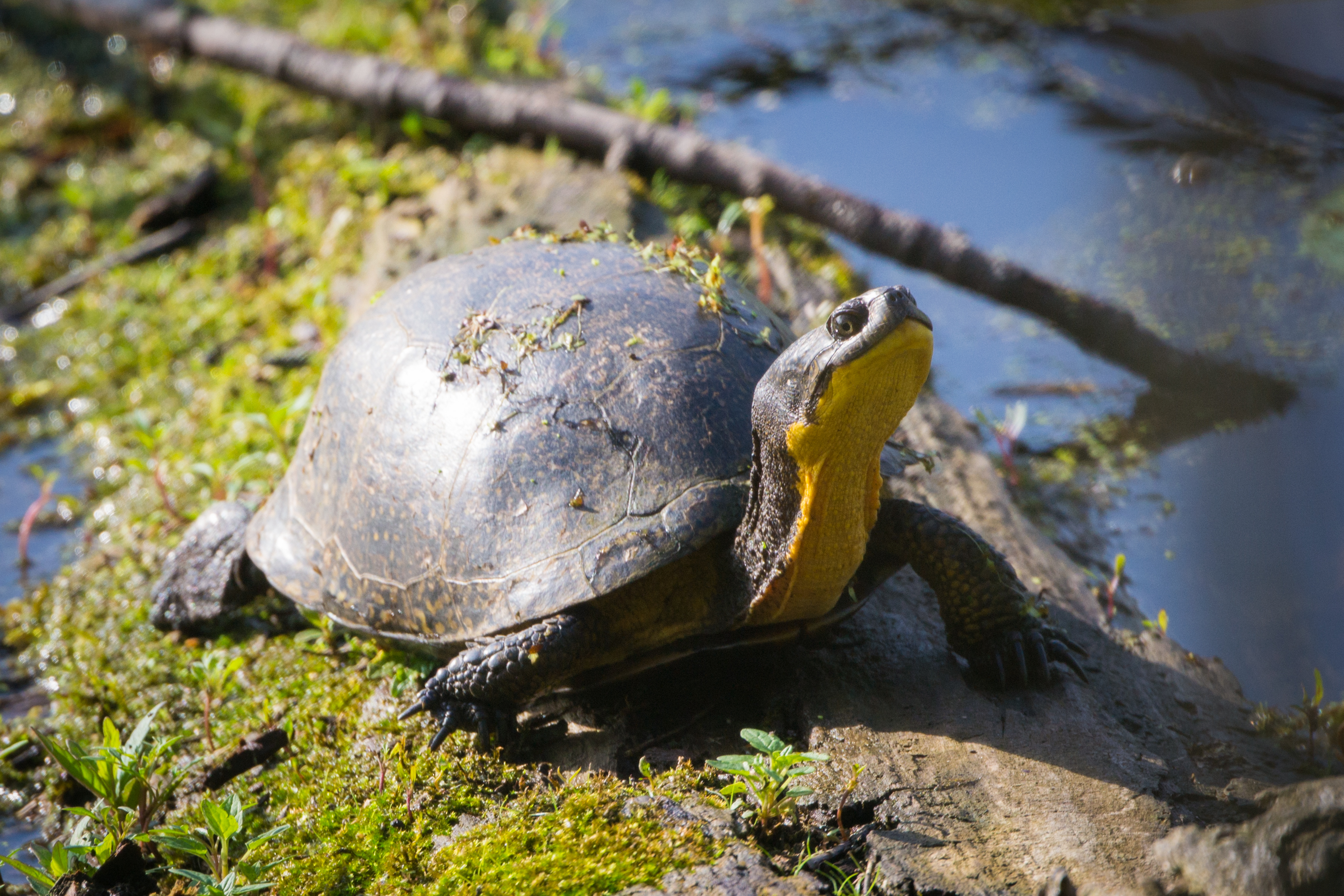
Blanding's turtle (Emydoidea blandingii)

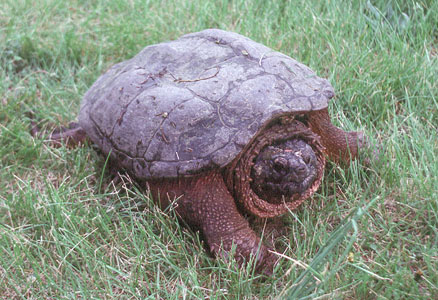
Common snapping turtle (Chelydra serpentina)

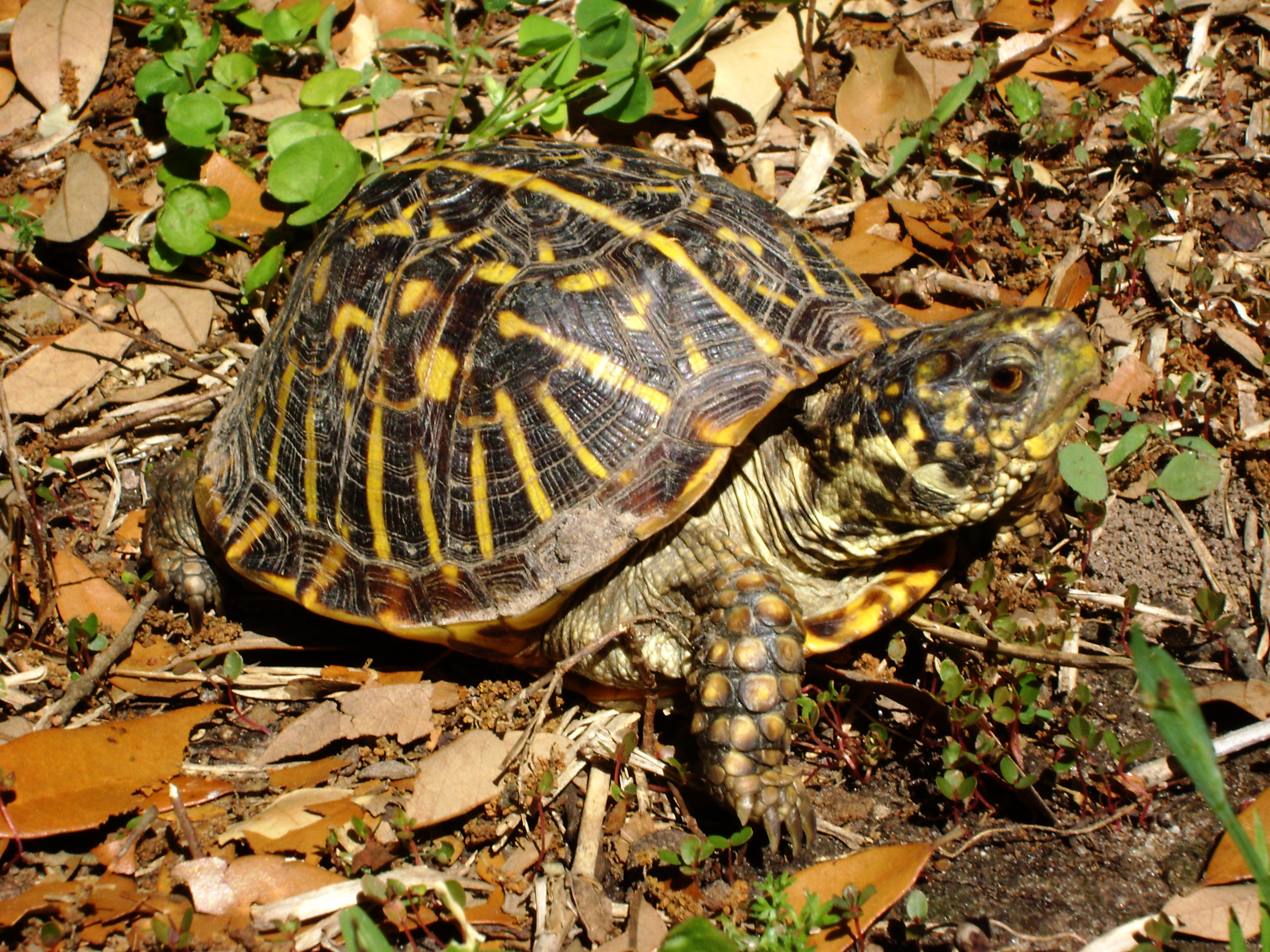
Ornate box turtle (Terrapene ornata ornata)

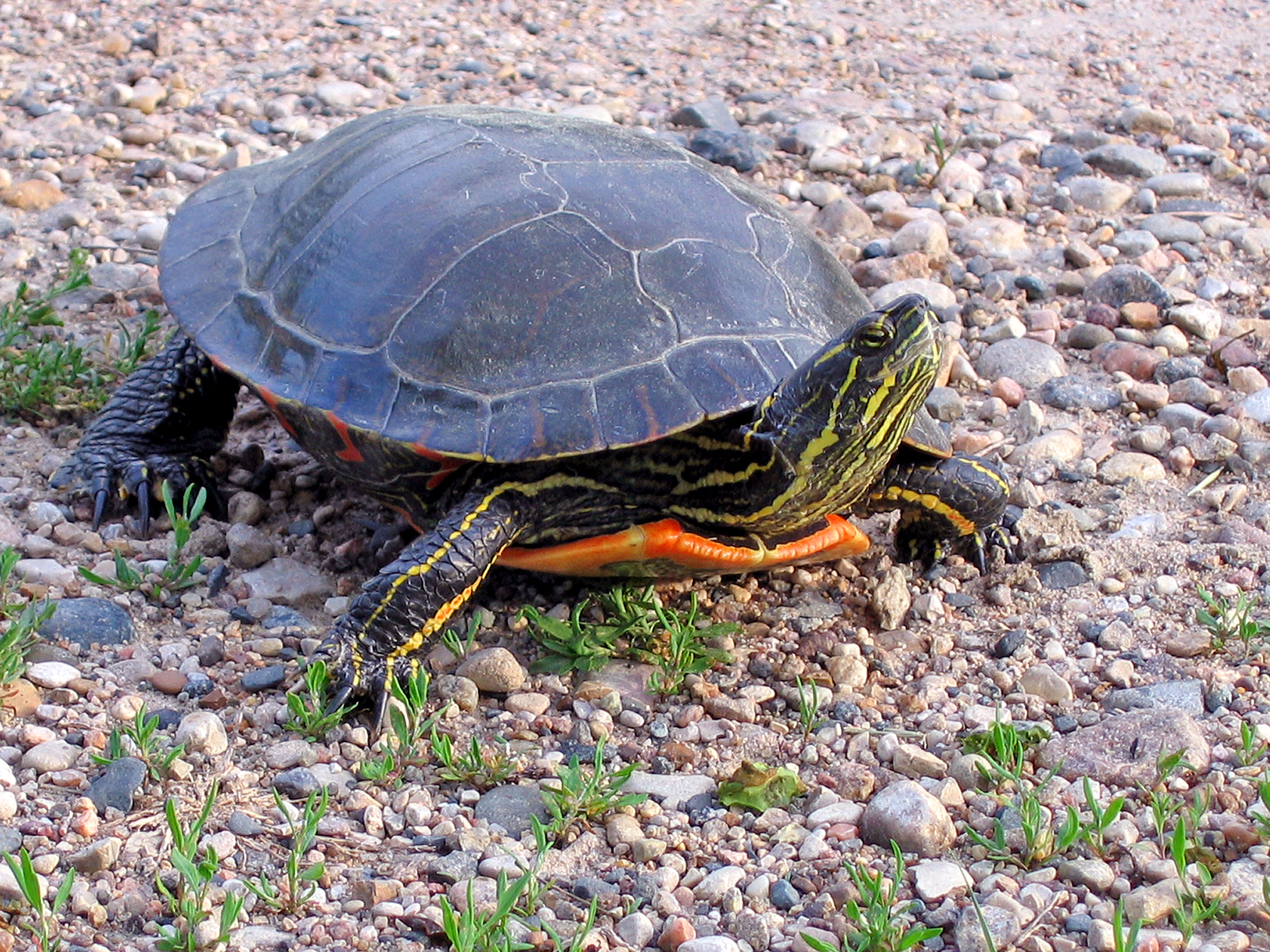
Painted turtle (Chrysemys picta)

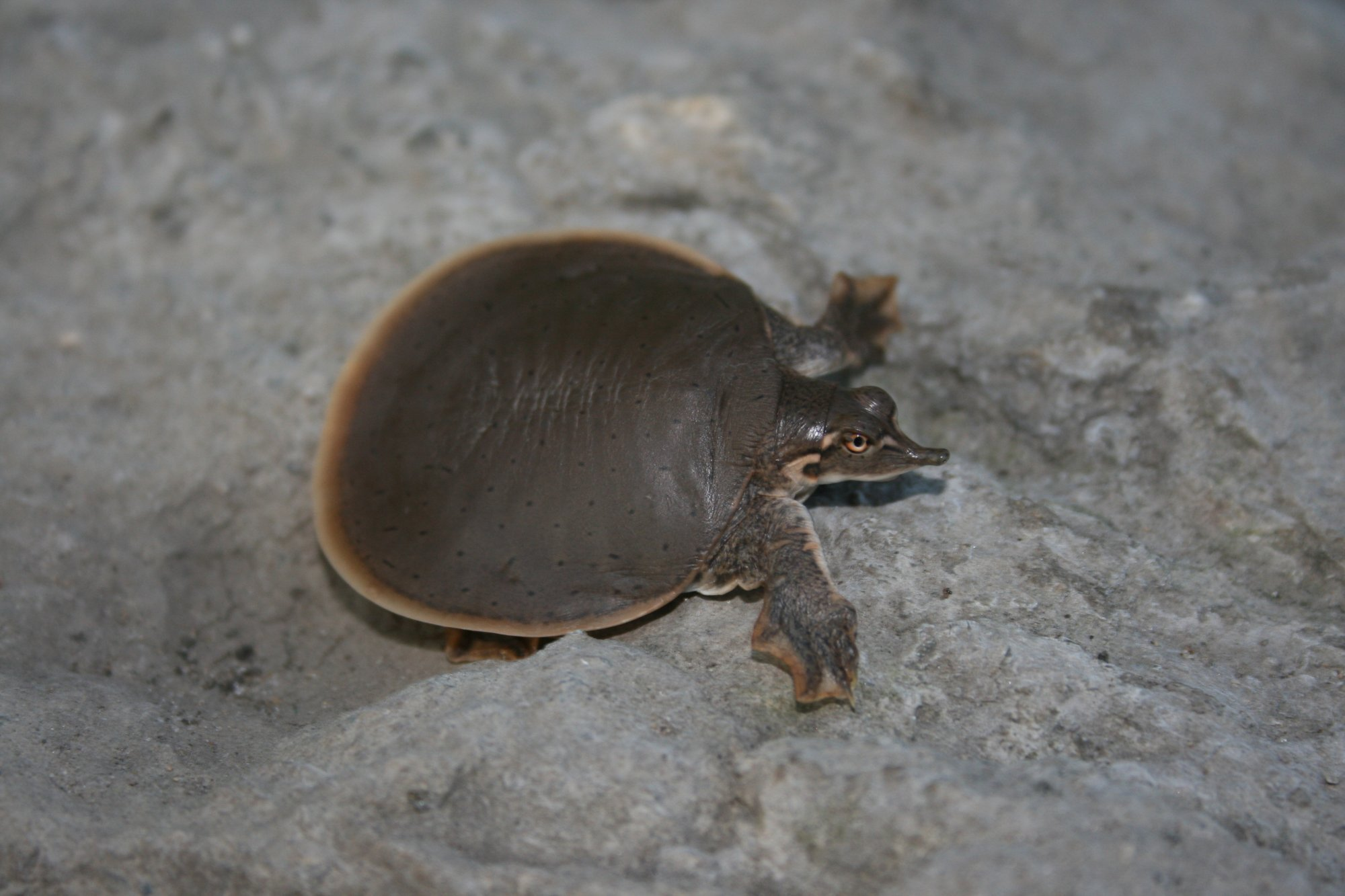
Smooth softshell turtle (Apalone mutica)

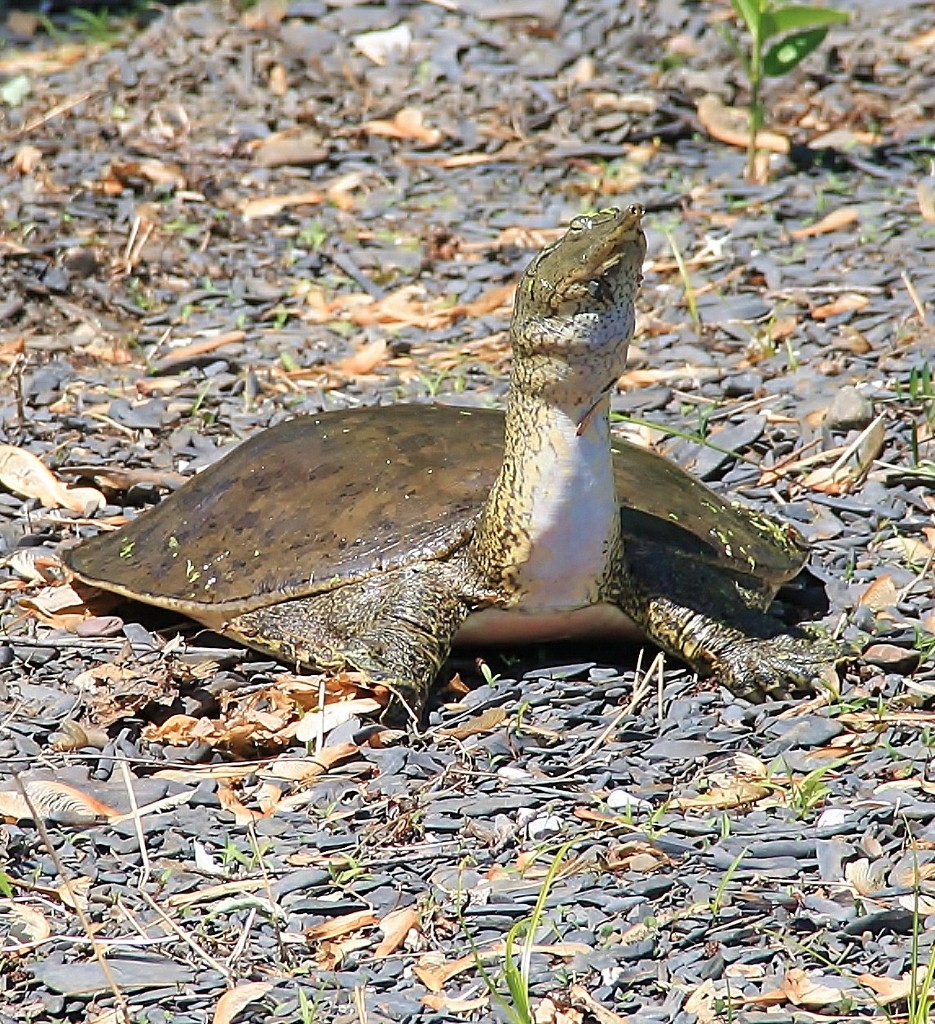
Spiny softshell turtle (Apalone spinifera)

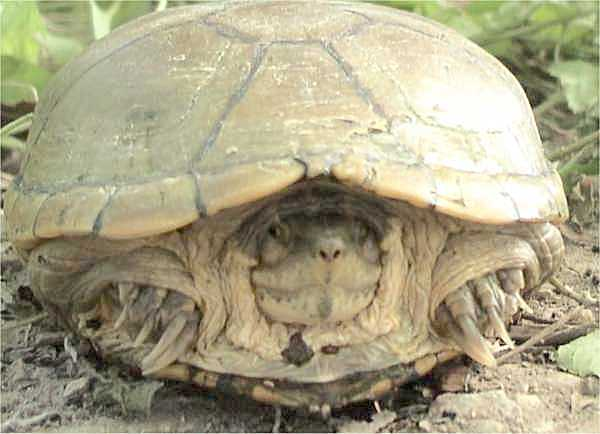
Yellow mud turtle (Kinosternon flavescens)
