= List of amphibians of the United States =

This is a list of amphibians found in the United States. A total of 306 amphibian species have been recorded in the United States, 2 of which are now extinct. This list is derived from the database listing of Amphibian Species of the World.

== Salamanders (Caudata) ==
=== Ambystomatidae ===
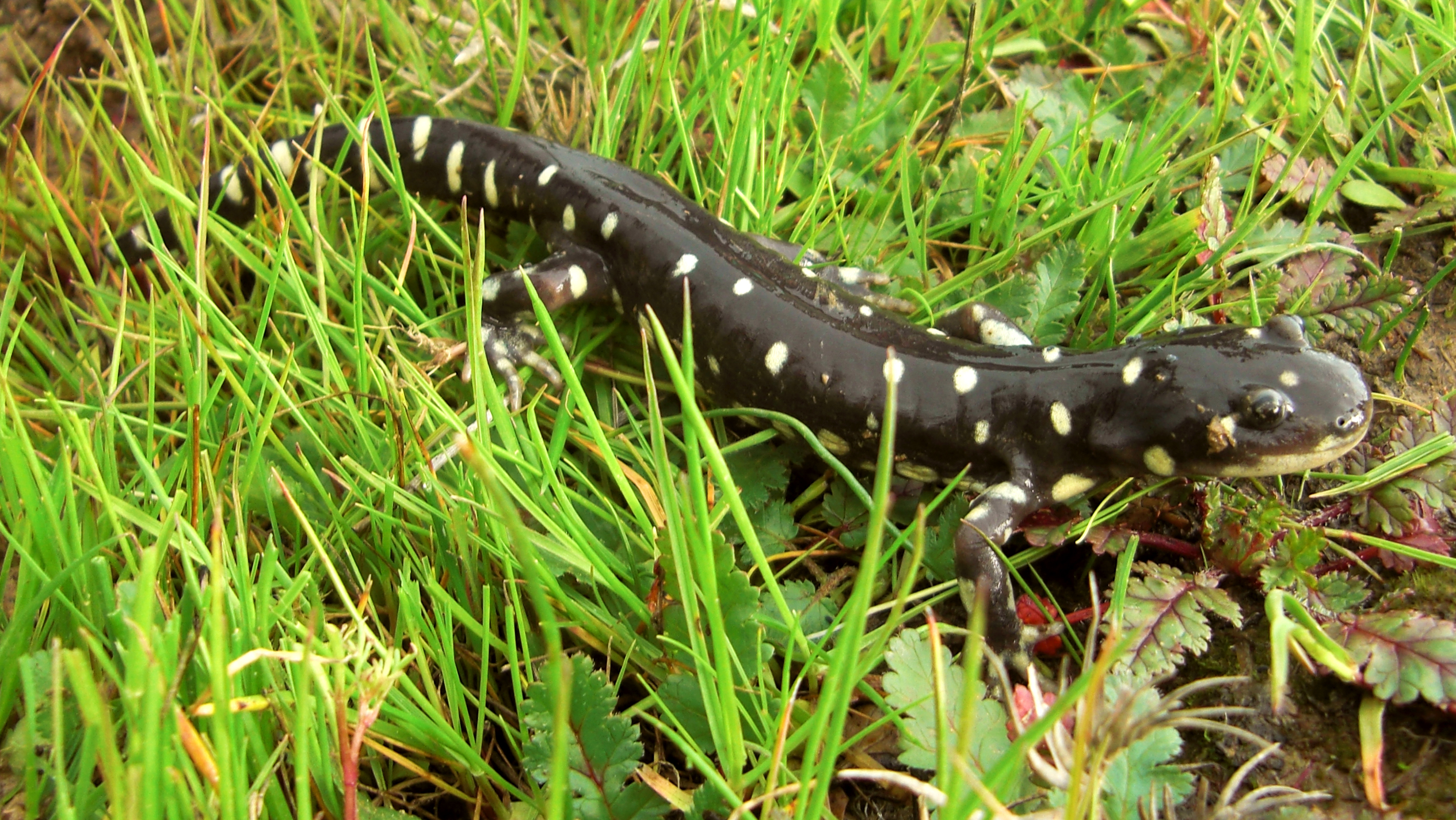
California tiger salamander

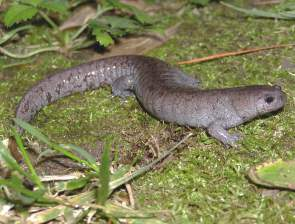
Streamside salamander

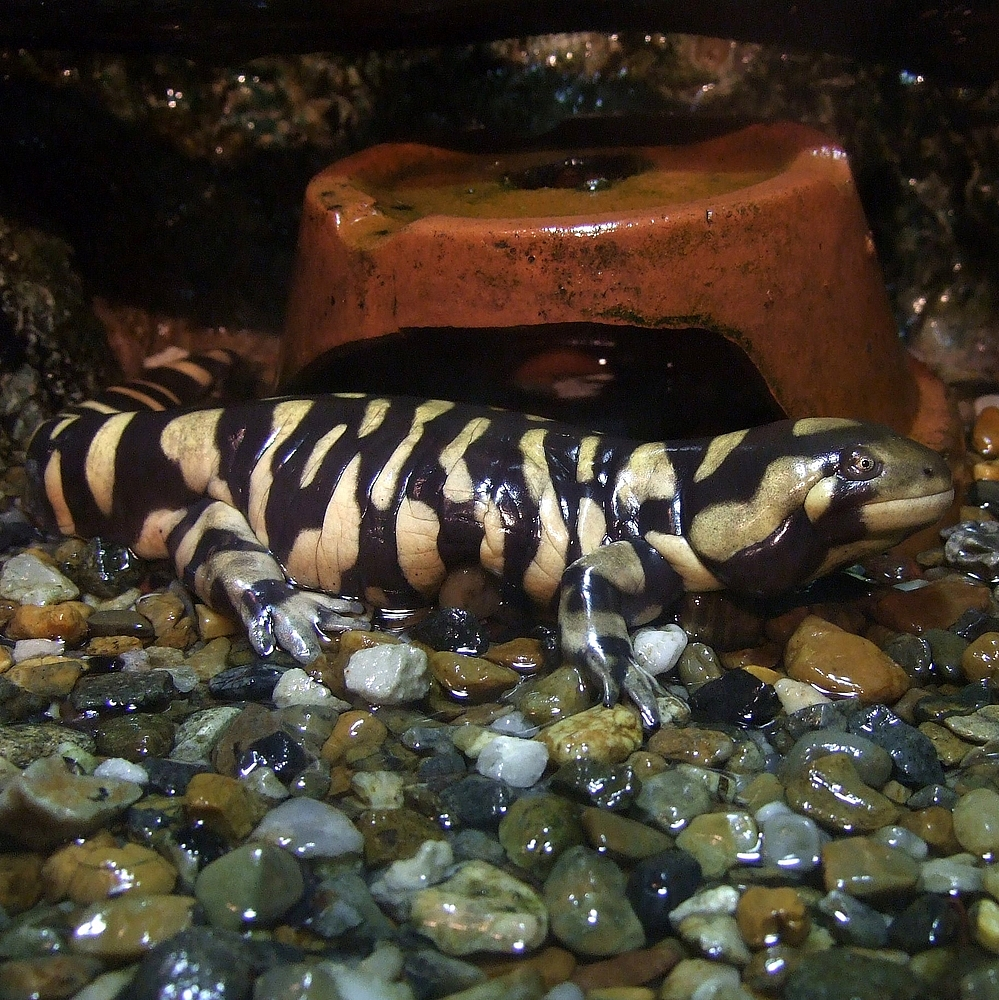
Barred tiger salamander

Order: Caudata. Family: Ambystomatidae

- Ringed salamander (Ambystoma annulatum Cope, 1886)
- Streamside salamander (Ambystoma barbouri Kraus & Petranka, 1989)
- Reticulated flatwoods salamander (Ambystoma bishopi Goin, 1950)
- California tiger salamander (Ambystoma californiense Gray, 1853)
- Frosted flatwoods salamander (Ambystoma cingulatum Cope, 1868)
- Northwestern salamander (Ambystoma gracile Baird, 1859)
- Jefferson salamander (Ambystoma jeffersonianum Green, 1827)
- Blue-spotted salamander (Ambystoma laterale Hallowell, 1856)
- Mabee's salamander (Ambystoma mabeei Bishop, 1928)
- Long-toed salamander (Ambystoma macrodactylum Baird, 1850)
- Spotted salamander (Ambystoma maculatum Shaw, 1802)
- Barred tiger salamander (Ambystoma mavortium Baird, 1850)
- Marbled salamander (Ambystoma opacum Gravenhorst, 1807)
- Mole salamander (Ambystoma talpoideum Holbrook, 1838)
- Small-mouth salamander (Ambystoma texanum Matthes, 1855)
- Tiger salamander (Ambystoma tigrinum Green, 1825)
- Idaho giant salamander (Dicamptodon aterrimus Cope, 1868)
- Cope's giant salamander (Dicamptodon copei Nussbaum, 1970)
- California giant salamander (Dicamptodon ensatus Eschscholtz, 1833)
- Coastal giant salamander (Dicamptodon tenebrosus Baird & Girard, 1852)

=== Amphiumidae ===
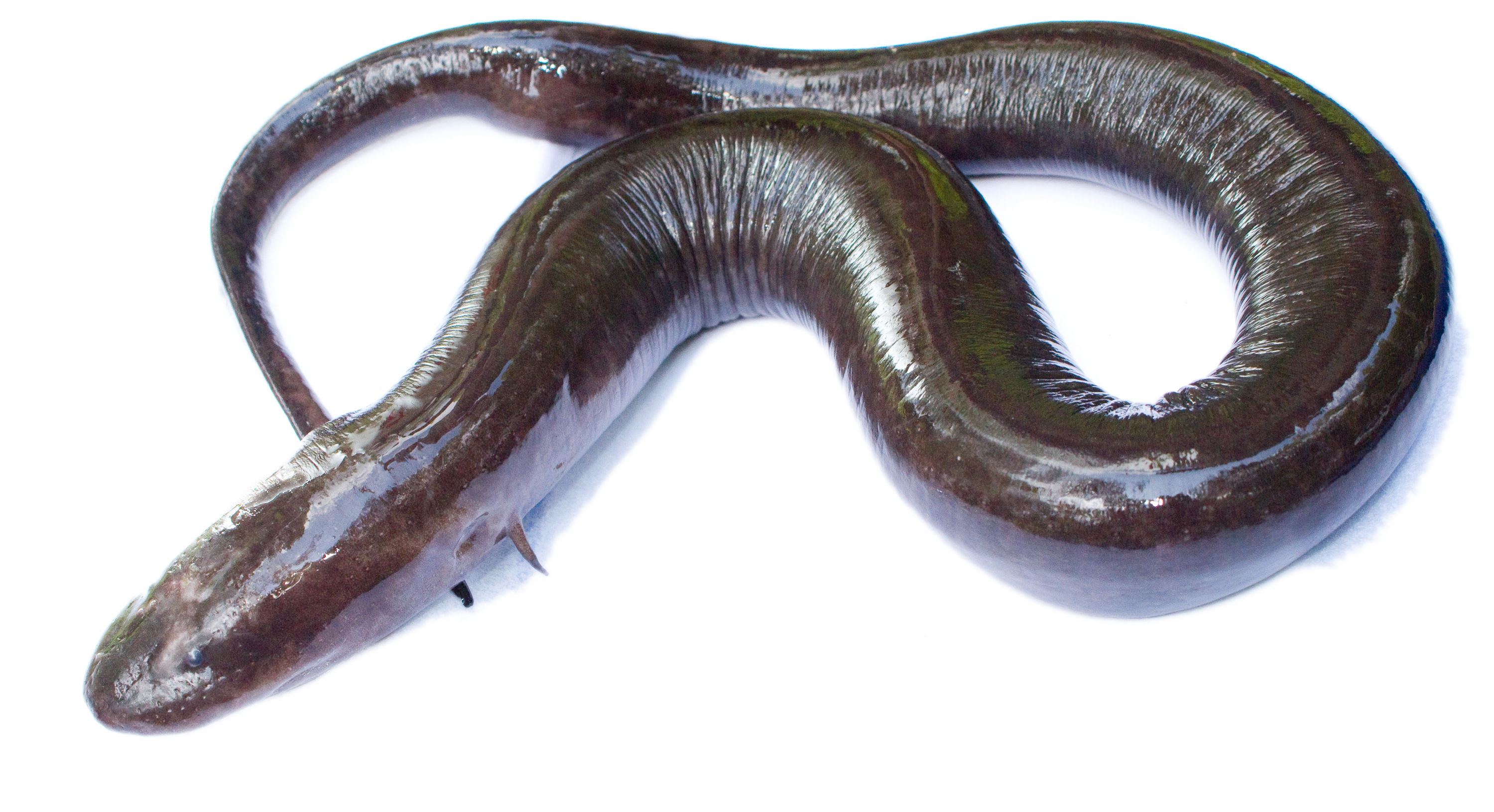
Two-toed amphiuma

Order: Caudata. Family: Amphiumidae

- Two-toed amphiuma (Amphiuma means Garden, 1821)
- One-toed amphiuma (Amphiuma pholeter Neill, 1964)
- Three-toed amphiuma (Amphiuma tridactylum Cuvier, 1827)

=== Cryptobranchidae ===
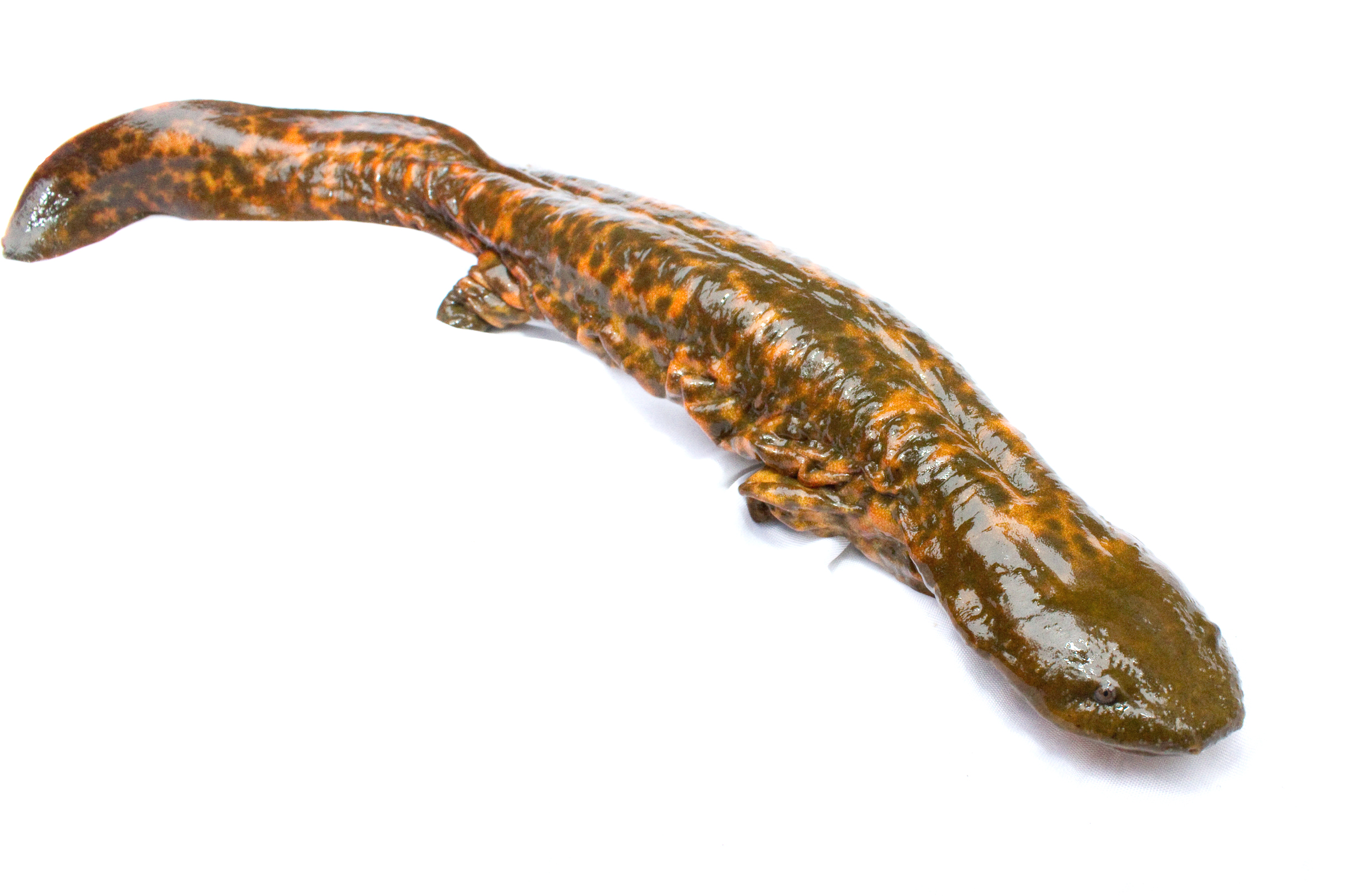
Hellbender

Order: Caudata. Family: Cryptobranchidae

- Hellbender (Cryptobranchus alleganiensis Sonnini de Manoncourt & Latreille, 1801)
- Ozark hellbender (Cryptobranchus bishopi Grobman, 1943)

=== Plethodontidae ===
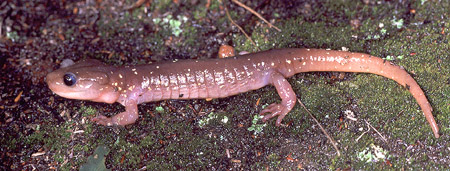
Arboreal salamander

Order: Caudata. Family: Plethodontidae

- Greenhorn Mountains slender salamander (Batrachoseps altasierrae Jockusch, Martínez-Solano, Hansen, & Wake, 2012)
- California slender salamander (Batrachoseps attenuatus Eschscholtz, 1833)
- Fairview slender salamander (Batrachoseps bramei Jockusch, Martínez-Solano, Hansen, & Wake, 2012)
- Inyo Mountains salamander (Batrachoseps campi Marlow, Brode, & Wake, 1979)
- Hell Hollow slender salamander (Batrachoseps diabolicus Jockusch, Wake, & Yanev, 1998)
- San Gabriel slender salamander (Batrachoseps gabrieli Wake, 1996)
- Gabilan Mountains slender salamander (Batrachoseps gavilanensis Jockusch, Yanev, & Wake, 2001)
- Gregarious slender salamander (Batrachoseps gregarius Jockusch, Wake, & Yanev, 1998)
- San Simeon slender salamander (Batrachoseps incognitus Jockusch, Yanev, & Wake, 2001)
- Sequoia slender salamander (Batrachoseps kawia Jockusch, Wake, & Yanev, 1998)
- Santa Lucia Mountains slender salamander (Batrachoseps luciae Jockusch, Yanev, & Wake, 2001)
- Garden slender salamander (Batrachoseps major Camp, 1915)
- Lesser slender salamander (Batrachoseps minor Jockusch, Yanev, & Wake, 2001)
- Black-bellied slender salamander (Batrachoseps nigriventris Cope, 1869)
- Channel Islands slender salamander (Batrachoseps pacificus Cope, 1865)
- Kings River slender salamander (Batrachoseps regius Jockusch, Wake, & Yanev, 1998)
- Relictual slender salamander (Batrachoseps relictus Brame & Murray, 1968)
- Kern Plateau salamander (Batrachoseps robustus Wake, Yanev, & Hansen, 2002)
- Kern Canyon slender salamander (Batrachoseps simatus Brame & Murray, 1968)
- Tehachapi slender salamander (Batrachoseps stebbinsi Brame & Murray, 1968)
- Oregon slender salamander (Batrachoseps wrighti Bishop, 1937)
- Brownback salamander (Eurycea aquatica Rose & Bush, 1963)
- Carolina Sandhills salamander (Eurycea arenicola Stuart et al., 2020)
- Northern two-lined salamander (Eurycea bislineata Green, 1818)
- Chamberlain's dwarf salamander (Eurycea chamberlaini Harrison & Guttman, 2003)
- Salado Springs salamander (Eurycea chisholmensis Chippindale, Price, Wiens, & Hillis, 2000)
- Southern two-lined salamander (Eurycea cirrigera Green, 1831)
- Three-lined salamander (Eurycea guttolineata Holbrook, 1838)
- Junaluska salamander (Eurycea junaluska Sever, Dundee, & Sullivan, 1976)
- Cascade Caverns salamander (Eurycea latitans Smith & Potter, 1946)
- Long-tailed salamander (Eurycea longicauda Green, 1818)
- Spotted-tail salamander (Eurycea lucifuga Rafinesque, 1822)
- Many-ribbed salamander (Eurycea multiplicata Cope, 1869)
- San Marcos salamander (Eurycea nana Bishop, 1941)
- Georgetown salamander (Eurycea naufragia Chippindale, Price, Wiens, & Hillis, 2000)
- Texas salamander (Eurycea neotenes Bishop & Wright, 1937)
- Fern bank salamander (Eurycea pterophila Burger, Smith, & Potter, 1950)
- Southeastern dwarf salamander (Eurycea quadridigitata Holbrook, 1842)
- Texas blind salamander (Eurycea rathbuni Stejneger, 1896)
- Blanco blind salamander (Eurycea robusta Longley, 1978)
- Barton Springs salamander (Eurycea sosorum Chippindale, Price, & Hillis, 1993)
- Western grotto salamander (Eurycea spelaea Stejneger, 1892)
- Eurycea subfluvicola (Eurycea subfluvicola Steffen, Irwin, Blair, & Bonett, 2014)
- Jollyville Plateau salamander (Eurycea tonkawae Chippindale, Price, Wiens, & Hillis, 2000)
- Comal blind salamander (Eurycea tridentifera Mitchell & Reddell, 1965)
- Valdina Farms salamander (Eurycea troglodytes Baker, 1957)
- Oklahoma salamander (Eurycea tynerensis Moore & Hughes, 1939)
- Georgia blind salamander (Eurycea wallacei Carr, 1939)
- Austin blind salamander (Eurycea waterlooensis Hillis, Chamberlain, Wilcox, & Chippindale, 2001)
- Blue Ridge two-lined salamander (Eurycea wilderae Dunn, 1920)
- Berry Cave salamander (Gyrinophilus gulolineatus Brandon, 1965)
- Tennessee cave salamander (Gyrinophilus palleucus McCrady, 1954)
- Spring salamander (Gyrinophilus porphyriticus Green, 1827)
- West Virginia spring salamander (Gyrinophilus subterraneus Besharse & Holsinger, 1977)
- Hemidactylium scutatum (Hemidactylium scutatum Temminck, 1838)
- Midland mud salamander (Pseudotriton diastictus Bishop, 1941)
- Mud salamander (Pseudotriton montanus Baird, 1850)
- Red salamander (Pseudotriton ruber Sonnini de Manoncourt & Latreille, 1801)
- Many-lined salamander (Stereochilus marginatus Hallowell, 1856)
- Patch-nosed salamander (Urspelerpes brucei Camp, Peterman, Milanovich, Lamb, Maerz, & Wake, 2009)
- Green salamander (Aneides aeneus Cope & Packard, 1881)
- Clouded salamander (Aneides ferreus Cope, 1869)
- Speckled black salamander (Aneides flavipunctatus Strauch, 1870)
- Sacramento Mountain salamander (Aneides hardii Taylor, 1941)
- Shasta black salamander (Aneides iecanus Cope, 1883)
- Arboreal salamander (Aneides lugubris Hallowell, 1849)
- Santa Cruz black salamander (Aneides niger Myers & Maslin, 1948)
- Wandering salamander (Aneides vagrans Wake & Jackman, 1999)
- Cumberland dusky salamander (Desmognathus abditus Anderson & Tilley, 2003)
- Cherokee Mountain dusky salamander (Desmognathus adatsihi Pyron and Beamer, 2022)
- Seepage salamander (Desmognathus aeneus Brown & Bishop, 1947)
- Nantahala black-bellied salamander (Desmognathus amphileucus Bishop, 1941)
- Foothills dusky salamander (Desmognathus anicetus Pyron and Beamer, 2023)
- Apalachicola dusky salamander (Desmognathus apalachicolae Means & Karlin, 1989)
- Golden shovel-nosed salamander (Desmognathus aureatus Martof, 1956)
- Holbrook's southern dusky salamander (Desmognathus auriculatus Holbrook, 1838)
- Piedmont dusky salamander (Desmognathus bairdi Pyron and Beamer, 2023)
- Great Balsams Mountain dusky salamander (Desmognathus balsameus Pyron and Beamer, 2022)
- Ouachita dusky salamander (Desmognathus brimleyorum Stejneger, 1895)
- Savannah dusky salamander (Desmognathus campi Pyron and Beamer, 2023)
- Carolina mountain dusky salamander (Desmognathus carolinensis Dunn, 1916)
- Western spotted dusky salamander (Desmognathus catahoula Pyron and Beamer, 2023)
- Talladega seal salamander (Desmognathus cheaha Pyron, O'Connell, Duncan, Burbrink, and Beamer, 2023)
- Spotted dusky salamander (Desmognathus conanti Rossman, 1958)
- Dwarf black-bellied salamander (Desmognathus folkertsi Camp, Tilley, Austin, & Marshall, 2002)
- Northern dusky salamander (Desmognathus fuscus Rafinesque, 1820)
- Cherokee black-bellied salamander (Desmognathus gvnigeusgwotli Pyron and Beamer, 2022)
- Imitator salamander (Desmognathus imitator Dunn, 1927)
- Western shovel-nosed salamander (Desmognathus intermedius Pope, 1928)
- Kanawha black-bellied salamander (Desmognathus kanawha Pyron and Beamer, 2022)
- Wolf dusky salamander (Desmognathus lycos Pyron and Beamer, 2023)
- Shovelnose salamander (Desmognathus marmoratus Moore, 1899)
- Pisgah black-bellied salamander (Desmognathus mavrokoilius Pyron and Beamer, 2022)
- Black shovel-nosed salamander (Desmognathus melanius Martof, 1956)
- Seal salamander (Desmognathus monticola Dunn, 1916)
- Allegheny Mountain dusky salamander (Desmognathus ochrophaeus Cope, 1859)
- Ocoee salamander (Desmognathus ocoee Nicholls, 1949)
- Blue Ridge dusky salamander (Desmognathus orestes Tilley & Mahoney, 1996)
- Northern pygmy salamander (Desmognathus organi Crespi, Browne, & Rissler, 2010)
- Pascagoula dusky salamander (Desmognathus pascagoula Pyron, O'Connell, Lamb, and Beamer, 2022)
- Chattooga dusky salamander (Desmognathus perlapsus Neill, 1950)
- Flat-headed salamander (Desmognathus planiceps Newman, 1955)
- Blackbelly salamander (Desmognathus quadramaculatus Holbrook, 1840) (defunct)
- Santeetlah dusky salamander (Desmognathus santeetlah Tilley, 1981)
- Max Patch dusky salamander (Desmognathus tilleyi Pyron and Beamer, 2023)
- Valentine's southern dusky salamander (Desmognathus valentinei Means, Lamb, and Bernardo, 2017)
- Carolina swamp dusky salamander (Desmognathus valtos Pyron and Beamer, 2022)
- Black mountain salamander (Desmognathus welteri Barbour, 1950)
- Pygmy salamander (Desmognathus wrighti King, 1936)
- Ensatina (Ensatina eschscholtzii Gray, 1850)
- Limestone salamander (Hydromantes brunus Gorman, 1954)
- Mount Lyell salamander (Hydromantes platycephalus Camp, 1916)
- Shasta salamander (Hydromantes shastae Gorman & Camp, 1953)
- Red Hills salamander (Phaeognathus hubrichti Highton, 1961)
- Ainsworth's salamander (Plethodon ainsworthi Lazell, 1998)
- Western slimy salamander (Plethodon albagula Grobman, 1944)
- Blue Ridge gray-cheeked salamander (Plethodon amplus Highton & Peabody, 2000)
- Ozark zigzag salamander (Plethodon angusticlavius Grobman, 1944)
- Scott Bar salamander (Plethodon asupak Mead, Clayton, Nauman, Olson, & Pfrender, 2005)
- Tellico salamander (Plethodon aureolus Highton, 1984)
- Caddo Mountain salamander (Plethodon caddoensis Pope & Pope, 1951)
- Chattahoochee slimy salamander (Plethodon chattahoochee Highton, 1989)
- Cheoah Bald salamander (Plethodon cheoah Highton & Peabody, 2000)
- Atlantic Coast slimy salamander (Plethodon chlorobryonis Mittleman, 1951)
- Red-backed salamander (Plethodon cinereus Green, 1818)
- White-spotted slimy salamander (Plethodon cylindraceus Harlan, 1825)
- Northern zigzag salamander (Plethodon dorsalis Cope, 1889)
- Dunn's salamander (Plethodon dunni Bishop, 1934)
- Northern ravine salamander (Plethodon electromorphus Highton, 1999)
- Del Norte salamander (Plethodon elongatus Van Denburgh, 1916)
- Fourche Mountain salamander (Plethodon fourchensis Duncan & Highton, 1979)
- Northern slimy salamander (Plethodon glutinosus Green, 1818)
- Southeastern slimy salamander (Plethodon grobmani Allen & Neill, 1949)
- Valley and ridge salamander (Plethodon hoffmani Highton, 1972)
- Peaks of Otter salamander (Plethodon hubrichti Thurow, 1957)
- Coeur d'Alene salamander (Plethodon idahoensis Slater & Slipp, 1940)
- Red-cheeked salamander (Plethodon jordani Blatchley, 1901)
- Cumberland Plateau salamander (Plethodon kentucki Mittleman, 1951)
- Kiamichi slimy salamander (Plethodon kiamichi Highton, 1989)
- Louisiana slimy salamander (Plethodon kisatchie Highton, 1989)
- Larch Mountain salamander (Plethodon larselli Burns, 1954)
- South Mountain gray-cheeked salamander (Plethodon meridianus Highton & Peabody, 2000)
- Southern gray-cheeked salamander (Plethodon metcalfi Brimley, 1912)
- Mississippi slimy salamander (Plethodon mississippi Highton, 1989)
- Northern gray-cheeked salamander (Plethodon montanus Highton & Peabody, 2000)
- Jemez Mountains salamander (Plethodon neomexicanus Stebbins & Riemer, 1950)
- Cheat Mountain salamander (Plethodon nettingi Green, 1938)
- Ocmulgee slimy salamander (Plethodon ocmulgee Highton, 1989)
- Rich Mountain salamander (Plethodon ouachitae Dunn & Heinze, 1933)
- Pigeon Mountain salamander (Plethodon petraeus Wynn, Highton, & Jacobs, 1988)
- Cow Knob salamander (Plethodon punctatus Highton, 1972)
- Ravine salamander (Plethodon richmondi Netting & Mittleman, 1938)
- Savannah slimy salamander (Plethodon savannah Highton, 1989)
- Sequoyah slimy salamander (Plethodon sequoyah Highton, 1989)
- Southern red-backed salamander (Plethodon serratus Grobman, 1944)
- Shenandoah salamander (Plethodon shenandoah Highton & Worthington, 1967)
- Big Levels salamander (Plethodon sherando Highton, 2004)
- Red-legged salamander (Plethodon shermani Stejneger, 1906)
- Siskiyou Mountains salamander (Plethodon stormi Highton & Brame, 1965)
- Southern Appalachian salamander (Plethodon teyahalee Hairston, 1950)
- Van Dyke's salamander (Plethodon vandykei Van Denburgh, 1906)
- South Carolina slimy salamander (Plethodon variolatus Gilliams, 1818)
- Western redback salamander (Plethodon vehiculum Cooper, 1860)
- Southern zigzag salamander (Plethodon ventralis Highton, 1997)
- Shenandoah Mountain salamander (Plethodon virginia Highton, 1999)
- Webster's salamander (Plethodon websteri Highton, 1979)
- Wehrle's salamander (Plethodon wehrlei Fowler & Dunn, 1917)
- Weller's salamander (Plethodon welleri Walker, 1931)
- Yonahlossee salamander (Plethodon yonahlossee Dunn, 1917)

=== Proteidae ===
Order: Caudata. Family: Proteidae

- Alabama waterdog (Necturus alabamensis Viosca, 1937)
- Western waterdog (Necturus beyeri Viosca, 1937)
- Neuse River waterdog (Necturus lewisi Brimley, 1924)
- Red River waterdog (Necturus louisianensis Viosca, 1938)
- Common mudpuppy (Necturus maculosus Rafinesque, 1818)
- Dwarf waterdog (Necturus punctatus Gibbes, 1850)

=== Rhyacotritonidae ===
Order: Caudata. Family: Rhyacotritonidae

- Cascade torrent salamander (Rhyacotriton cascadae Good & Wake, 1992)
- Columbia torrent salamander (Rhyacotriton kezeri Good & Wake, 1992)
- Olympic torrent salamander (Rhyacotriton olympicus Gaige, 1917)
- Southern torrent salamander (Rhyacotriton variegatus Stebbins & Lowe, 1951)

=== Salamandridae ===
Order: Caudata. Family: Salamandridae

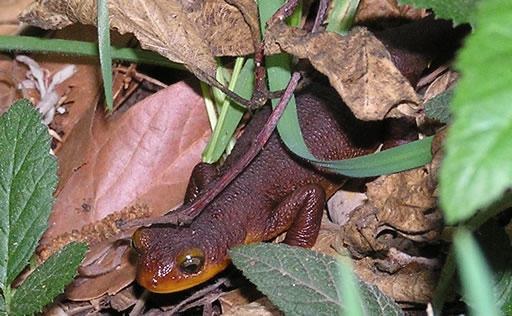
California newt

- Texas newt (Notophthalmus meridionalis Cope, 1880)
- Notophthalmus perstriatus (Notophthalmus perstriatus Bishop, 1941)
- Eastern newt (Notophthalmus viridescens Rafinesque, 1820)
- Rough-skinned newt (Taricha granulosa Skilton, 1849)
- Red-bellied newt (Taricha rivularis Twitty, 1935)
- Sierra newt (Taricha sierrae Twitty, 1942)
- California newt (Taricha torosa Rathke, 1833)

=== Sirenidae ===
Order: Caudata. Family: Sirenidae

- Southern dwarf siren (Pseudobranchus axanthus Netting & Goin, 1942)
- Northern dwarf siren (Pseudobranchus striatus LeConte, 1824)
- Lesser siren (Siren intermedia Barnes, 1826)
- Greater siren (Siren lacertina Österdam, 1766)
- Texas dwarf siren (Siren nettingi Goin, 1942)
- Reticulated siren (Siren reticulata Graham et al., 2018)
- Seepage siren (Siren sphagnicola Fedler, Enge, & Moler, 2023)

== Frogs and Toads (Anura) ==
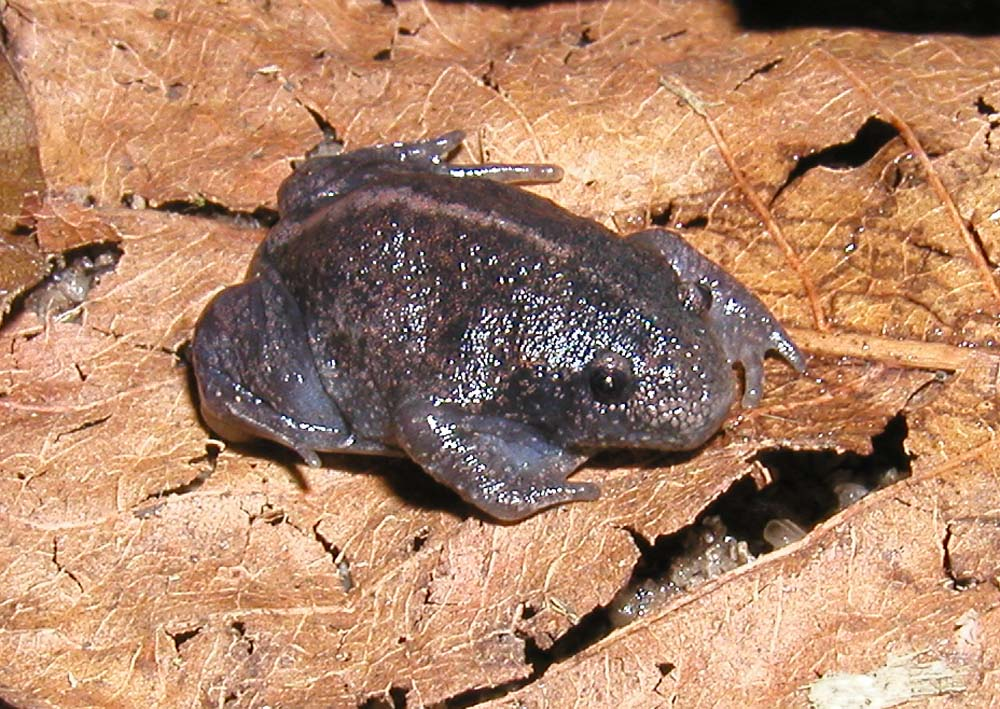
Mexican burrowing toad

=== Ascaphidae ===
Order: Anura. Family: Ascaphidae

- Rocky Mountain tailed frog (Ascaphus montanus Mittleman & Myers, 1949)
- Pacific tailed frog (Ascaphus truei Stejneger, 1899)

=== Bufonidae ===
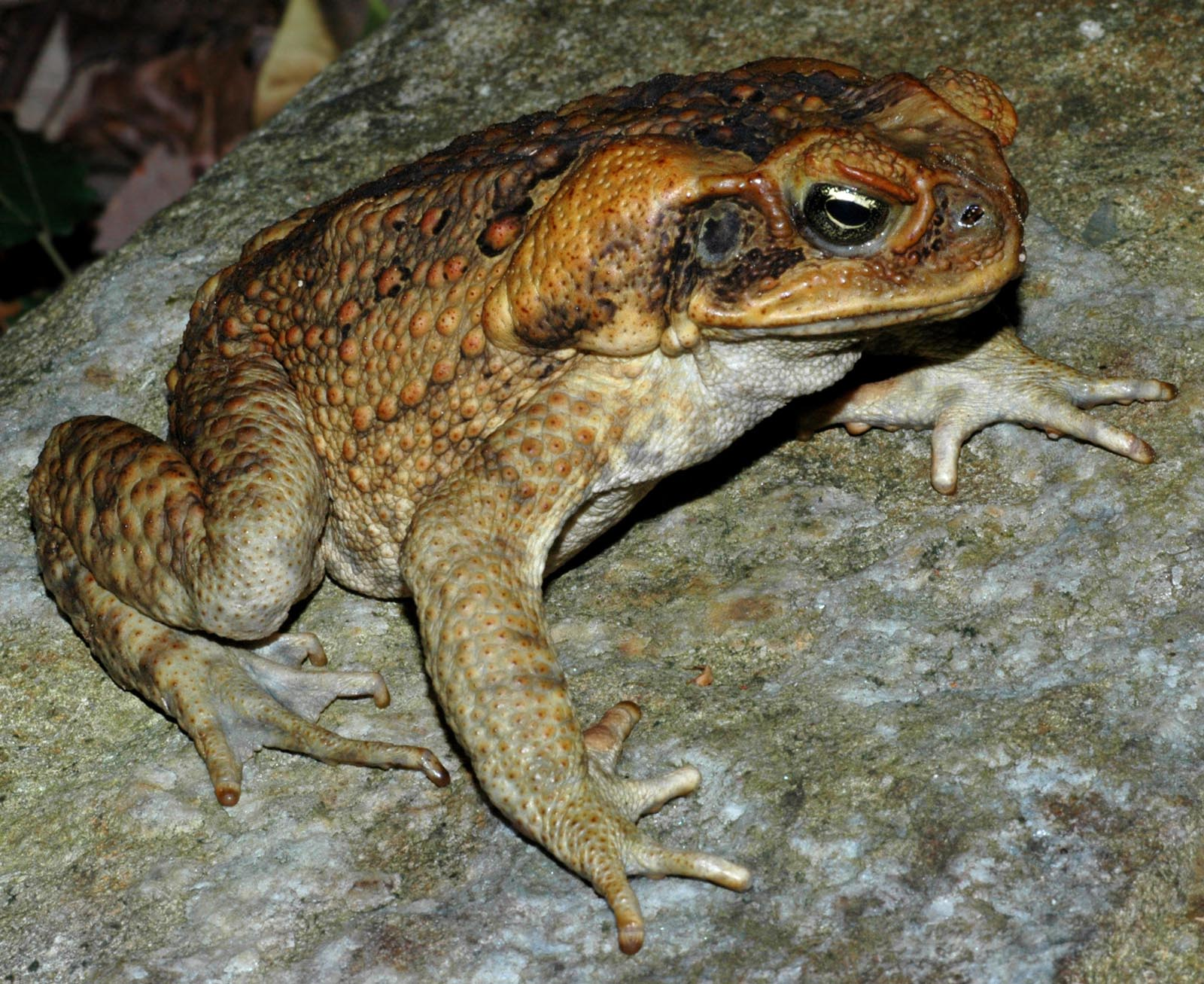
Cane toad

Order: Anura. Family: Bufonidae

- American toad (Anaxyrus americanus Holbrook, 1836)
- Wyoming toad (Anaxyrus baxteri Porter, 1968)
- Western toad (Anaxyrus boreas Baird & Girard, 1852)
- Arroyo toad (Anaxyrus californicus Camp, 1915)
- Yosemite toad (Anaxyrus canorus Camp, 1916)
- Great Plains toad (Anaxyrus cognatus Say, 1822)
- Green toad (Anaxyrus debilis Girard, 1854)
- Black toad (Anaxyrus exsul Myers, 1942)
- Fowler's toad (Anaxyrus fowleri Hinckley, 1882)
- Canadian toad (Anaxyrus hemiophrys Cope, 1886)
- Houston toad (Anaxyrus houstonensis Sanders, 1953)
- Arizona toad (Anaxyrus microscaphus Cope, 1867)
- Amargosa toad (Anaxyrus nelsoni Stejneger, 1893)
- Red-spotted toad (Anaxyrus punctatus Baird & Girard, 1852)
- Oak toad (Anaxyrus quercicus Holbrook, 1840)
- Sonoran green toad (Anaxyrus retiformis Sanders & Smith, 1951)
- Texas toad (Anaxyrus speciosus Girard, 1854)
- Southern toad (Anaxyrus terrestris Bonnaterre, 1789)
- Woodhouse's toad (Anaxyrus woodhousii Girard, 1854)
- Colorado River toad (Incilius alvarius Girard, 1859)
- Incilius nebulifer (Incilius nebulifer Girard, 1854)
- Cane toad (Rhinella marina Linnaeus, 1758)
- Mesoamerican cane toad (Rhinella horribilis Wiegmann, 1833)

=== Craugastoridae ===
Order: Anura. Family: Craugastoridae

- Western barking frog (Craugastor augusti Dugès, 1879)

=== Dendrobatidae ===
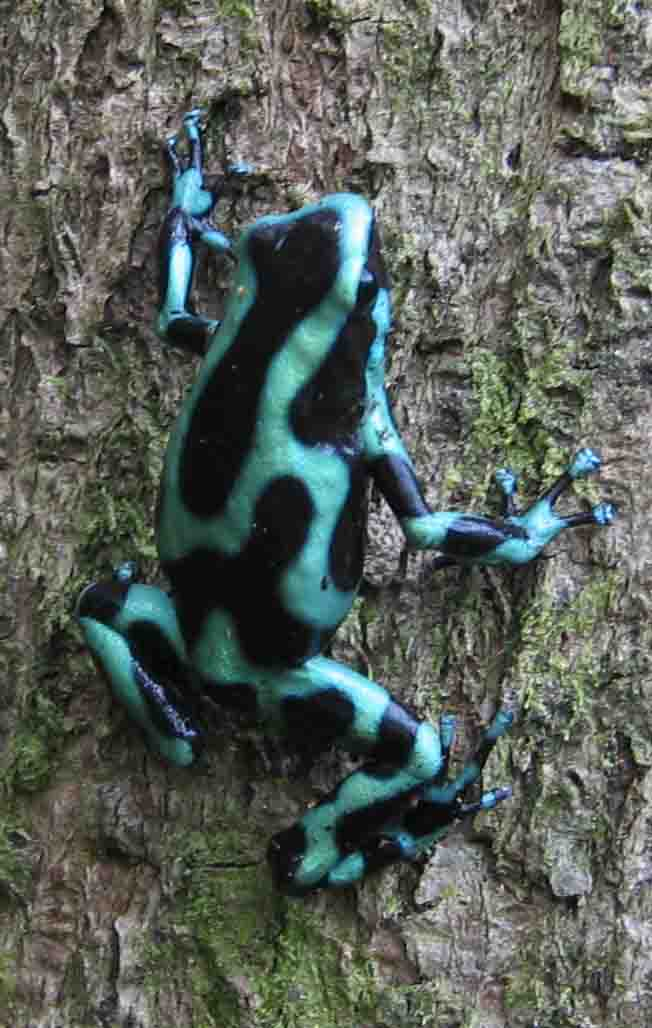
Green-and-black poison dart frog

Order: Anura. Family: Dendrobatidae

- Green-and-black poison dart frog (Dendrobates auratus Girard, 1855)

=== Eleutherodactylidae ===
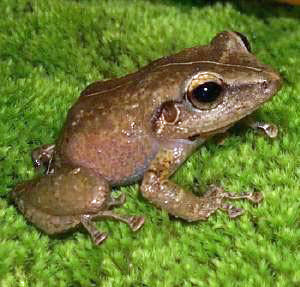
Coqui

Order: Anura. Family: Eleutherodactylidae

- Coqui (Eleutherodactylus coqui Thomas, 1966)
- Rio Grande chirping frog (Eleutherodactylus cystignathoides Cope, 1877)
- Spotted chirping frog (Eleutherodactylus guttilatus Cope, 1879)
- Cliff chirping frog (Eleutherodactylus marnockii Cope, 1878)
- Greenhouse frog (Eleutherodactylus planirostris Cope, 1862)

=== Hylidae ===
Order: Anura. Family: Hylidae

- Blanchard's cricket frog (Acris blanchardi Harper, 1947)
- Northern cricket frog (Acris crepitans Baird, 1854)
- Southern cricket frog (Acris gryllus LeConte, 1825)
- Pine Barrens treefrog (Hyla andersonii Baird, 1854)
- Canyon treefrog (Hyla arenicolor Cope, 1866)
- Bird-voiced treefrog (Hyla avivoca Viosca, 1928)
- Cope's gray treefrog (Hyla chrysoscelis Cope, 1880)
- American green treefrog (Hyla cinerea Schneider, 1799)
- Pine woods treefrog (Hyla femoralis Daudin, 1800)
- Barking treefrog (Hyla gratiosa LeConte, 1856)
- Squirrel treefrog (Hyla squirella Daudin, 1800)
- Gray treefrog (Hyla versicolor LeConte, 1825)
- Wright's mountain treefrog (Hyla wrightorum Taylor, 1939)
- Cuban treefrog (Osteopilus septentrionalis Duméril & Bibron, 1841)
- Appalachian mountain chorus frog (Pseudacris brachyphona Cope, 1889)
- Brimley's chorus frog (Pseudacris brimleyi Brandt & Walker, 1933)
- California treefrog (Pseudacris cadaverina Cope, 1866)
- Spotted chorus frog (Pseudacris clarkii Baird, 1854)
- Collinses' mountain chorus frog (Pseudacris collinsorum Ospina et al., 2020)
- Spring peeper (Pseudacris crucifer Wied-Neuwied, 1838)
- Cajun chorus frog (Pseudacris fouquettei Lemmon, Lemmon, Collins, & Cannatella, 2008)
- Baja California chorus frog (Pseudacris hypochondriaca Hallowell, 1854)
- Illinois chorus frog (Pseudacris illinoensis Smith, 1951)
- New Jersey chorus frog (Pseudacris kalmi Harper, 1955)
- Boreal chorus frog (Pseudacris maculata Agassiz, 1850)
- Southern chorus frog (Pseudacris nigrita LeConte, 1825)
- Little grass frog (Pseudacris ocularis Holbrook, 1838)
- Ornate chorus frog (Pseudacris ornata Holbrook, 1836)
- Pacific tree frog (Pseudacris regilla Baird & Girard, 1852)
- Sierran chorus frog (Pseudacris sierra Jameson, Mackey, & Richmond, 1966)
- Strecker's chorus frog (Pseudacris streckeri Wright & Wright, 1933)
- Western chorus frog (Pseudacris triseriata Wied-Neuwied, 1838)
- Common Mexican tree frog (Smilisca baudinii Duméril & Bibron, 1841)
- Lowland burrowing tree frog (Smilisca fodiens Boulenger, 1882)
- Australian green tree frog (Litoria caerulea White, 1790)

=== Leptodactylidae ===
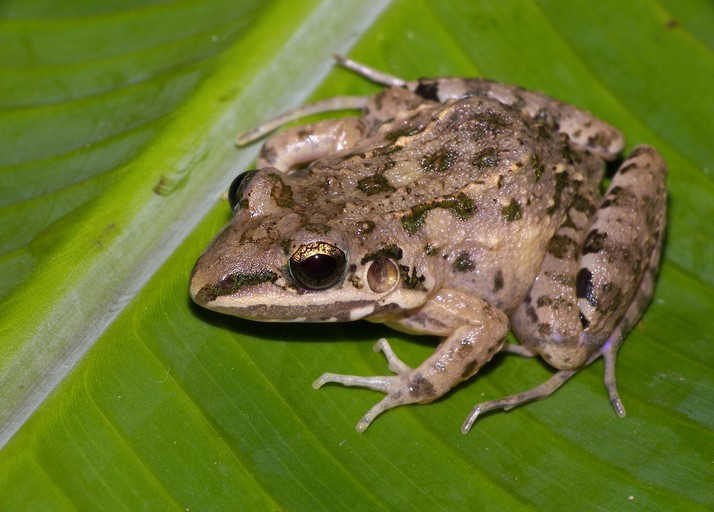
Mexican white-lipped frog

Order: Anura. Family: Leptodactylidae

- Mexican white-lipped frog (Leptodactylus fragilis Brocchi, 1877)

=== Microhylidae ===
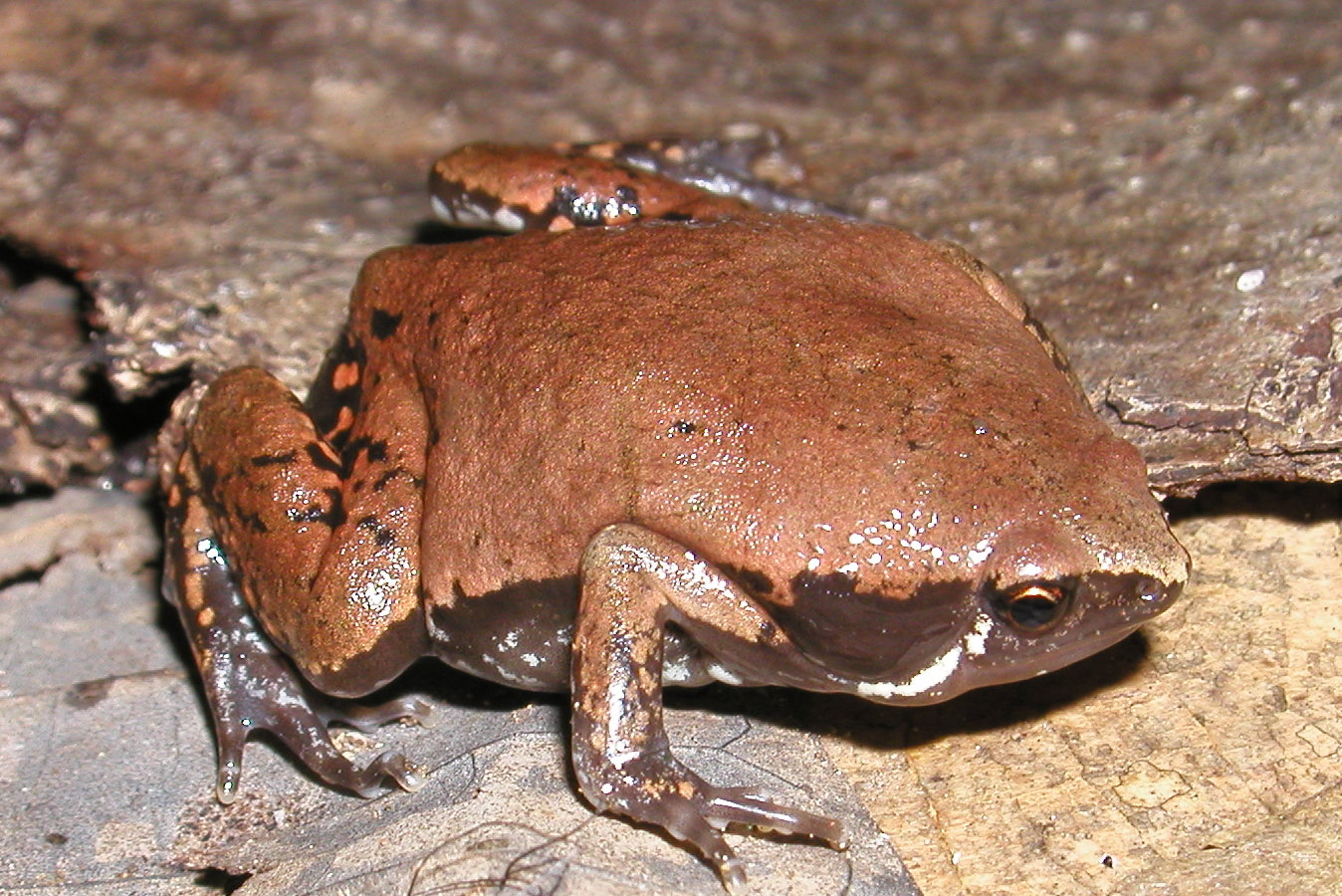
Northern sheep frog

Order: Anura. Family: Microhylidae

- Eastern narrow-mouthed toad (Gastrophryne carolinensis Holbrook, 1835)
- Mazatlan narrow-mouthed toad (Gastrophryne mazatlanensis Taylor, 1943)
- Great Plains narrow-mouthed toad (Gastrophryne olivacea Hallowell, 1856)
- Northern sheep frog (Hypopachus variolosus Cope, 1866)

=== Pipidae ===
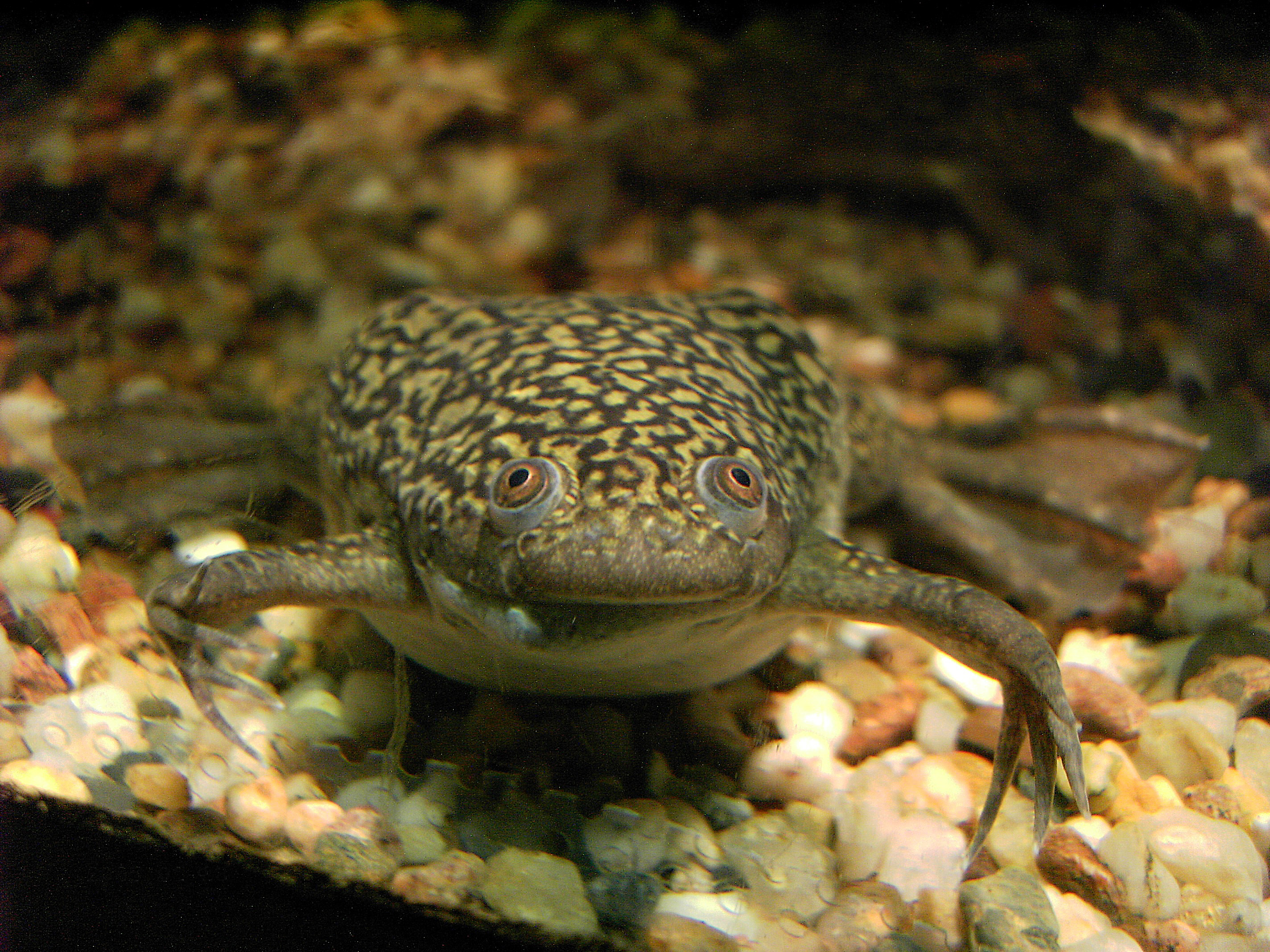
African clawed frog

Order: Anura. Family: Pipidae

- African clawed frog (Xenopus laevis Daudin, 1802)

=== Ranidae ===
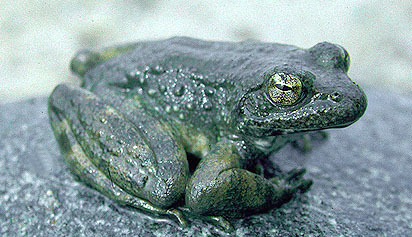
Foothill yellow-legged frog

Order: Anura. Family: Ranidae

- Japanese wrinkled frog (Glandirana rugosa Temminck & Schlegel, 1838)
- Crawfish frog (Lithobates areolatus Baird & Girard, 1852)
- Rio Grande leopard frog (Lithobates berlandieri Baird, 1859)
- Plains leopard frog (Lithobates blairi Mecham, Littlejohn, Oldham, Brown, & Brown, 1973)
- Gopher frog (Lithobates capito LeConte, 1855)
- American bullfrog (Lithobates catesbeianus Shaw, 1802)
- Chiricahua leopard frog (Lithobates chiricahuensis Platz & Mecham, 1979)
- Lithobates clamitans (Lithobates clamitans Latreille, 1801)
- Vegas Valley leopard frog (Lithobates fisheri Stejneger, 1893)
- Pig frog (Lithobates grylio Stejneger, 1901)
- River frog (Lithobates heckscheri Wright, 1924)
- Atlantic Coast leopard frog (Lithobates kauffeldi Feinberg et al., 2014)
- Florida bog frog (Lithobates okaloosae Moler, 1985)
- Relict leopard frog (Lithobates onca Cope, 1875)
- Pickerel frog (Lithobates palustris LeConte, 1825)
- Northern leopard frog (Lithobates pipiens Schreber, 1782)
- Mink frog (Lithobates septentrionalis Baird, 1854)
- Mississippi gopher frog (Lithobates sevosus Goin & Netting, 1940)
- Southern leopard frog (Lithobates sphenocephalus Cope, 1886)
- Wood frog (Lithobates sylvaticus LeConte, 1825)
- Tarahumara frog (Lithobates tarahumarae Boulenger, 1917)
- Carpenter frog (Lithobates virgatipes Cope, 1891)
- Lowland leopard frog (Lithobates yavapaiensis Platz & Frost, 1984)
- Northern red-legged frog (Rana aurora Baird & Girard, 1852)
- Foothill yellow-legged frog (Rana boylii Baird, 1854)
- Cascades frog (Rana cascadae Slater, 1939)
- California red-legged frog (Rana draytonii Baird & Girard, 1852)
- Columbia spotted frog (Rana luteiventris Thompson, 1913)
- Mountain yellow-legged frog (Rana muscosa Camp, 1917)
- Oregon spotted frog (Rana pretiosa Baird & Girard, 1853)
- Sierra Nevada yellow-legged frog (Rana sierrae Camp, 1917)

=== Rhinophrynidae ===
Order: Anura. Family: Rhinophrynidae

- Mexican burrowing toad (Rhinophrynus dorsalis Duméril & Bibron, 1841)

=== Scaphiopodidae ===
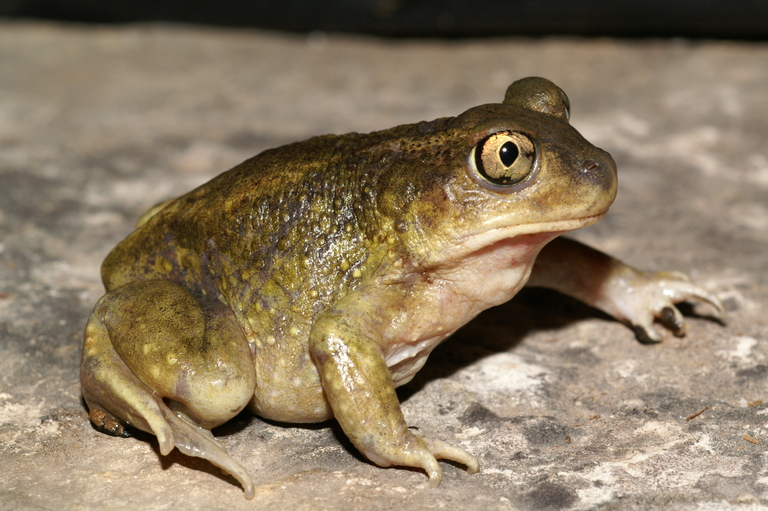
Hurter's spadefoot toad

Order: Anura. Family: Scaphiopodidae

- Couch's spadefoot toad (Scaphiopus couchii Baird, 1854)
- Scaphiopus holbrookii (Scaphiopus holbrookii Harlan, 1835)
- Hurter's spadefoot toad (Scaphiopus hurterii Strecker, 1910)
- Plains spadefoot toad (Spea bombifrons Cope, 1863)
- Spea hammondii (Spea hammondii Baird, 1859)
- Great Basin spadefoot (Spea intermontana Cope, 1883)
- New Mexico spadefoot toad (Spea multiplicata Cope, 1863)

== See also ==
List of amphibians native to the United States by state:

- List of amphibians of Alabama
- List of amphibians of Alaska
- List of amphibians of Arizona
- List of amphibians of Arkansas
- List of amphibians of California
- List of amphibians of Colorado
- List of amphibians of Connecticut
- List of amphibians of Delaware
- List of amphibians of Florida
- List of amphibians of Georgia
- List of amphibians of Hawaii
- List of amphibians of Idaho
- List of amphibians of Illinois
- List of amphibians of Indiana
- List of amphibians of Iowa
- List of amphibians of Kansas
- List of amphibians of Kentucky
- List of amphibians of Louisiana
- List of amphibians of Maine
- List of amphibians of Maryland
- List of amphibians of Massachusetts
- List of amphibians of Michigan
- List of amphibians of Minnesota
- List of amphibians of Mississippi
- List of amphibians of Missouri
- List of amphibians of Montana
- List of amphibians of Nebraska
- List of amphibians of Nevada
- List of amphibians of New Hampshire
- List of amphibians of New Jersey
- List of amphibians of New Mexico
- List of amphibians of New York
- List of amphibians of North Carolina
- List of amphibians of North Dakota
- List of amphibians of Ohio
- List of amphibians of Oklahoma
- List of amphibians of Oregon
- List of amphibians of Pennsylvania
- List of amphibians of Rhode Island
- List of amphibians of South Carolina
- List of amphibians of South Dakota
- List of amphibians of Tennessee
- List of amphibians of Texas
- List of amphibians of Utah
- List of amphibians of Vermont
- List of amphibians of Virginia
- List of amphibians of Washington (state)
- List of amphibians of West Virginia
- List of amphibians of Wisconsin
- List of amphibians of Wyoming
