= Lists of amphibians by region =

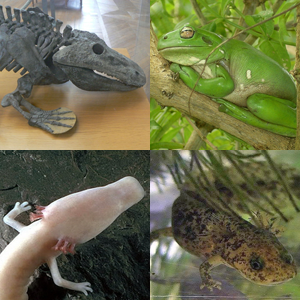
Collage of Eryops, Australian green tree frog, Olm and Hida salamander

Lists of amphibians by region are lists of amphibians in a given continent, country or smaller region.

== Africa ==
- Democratic Republic of the Congo
- Ghana
- Guinea-Bissau
- Ivory Coast
  - Daloa
- Madagascar
- Seychelles

== Asia ==
- Bhutan
- China
  - Hong Kong
- India
  - Northeast India
  - Sikkim
- Indonesia
  - Java
  - Sumatra
- Korea
- Malaysia
- Nepal
- Pakistan
- Philippines
  - Cebu
  - Panay
- Singapore
- Taiwan
- Thailand
- Vietnam
  - Hoàng Liên National Park

== Australasia ==
- Australia
  - South Australia
  - Western Australia
  - Tasmania
- New Zealand

== Europe ==
- Europe
- Bulgaria
- Cyprus
- France
- Gibraltar
- Great Britain
- Ireland
- Italy
- Norway
- Sweden

== North America ==
- North America north of Mexico
- Canada
  - Quebec
- Mexico
- United States

=== US states ===
- Alabama
- Alaska
- Arkansas
- Arizona
- California
- Colorado
- Florida
- Idaho
- Indiana
  - Indiana Dunes
- Iowa
- Massachusetts
- Michigan
- Minnesota
- Montana
- Nebraska
- New Jersey
- New Mexico
- North Carolina
- Oregon
- Pennsylvania
- Texas
- Vermont
- Virginia
  - Shenandoah National Park
- Washington
- West Virginia
- Wisconsin
- Wyoming
  - Yellowstone National Park

== Caribbean ==
- Anguilla
- Antigua and Barbuda
- Barbados
- Cuba
- Dominica
- Dominican Republic
- Grenadines
- Guadeloupe
- Haiti
- Martinique
- Montserrat
- Puerto Rico
- Saba
- Saint Barthélemy
- Saint Kitts and Nevis
- Saint Lucia
- Saint Martin
- Saint Vincent
- Sint Eustatius

== Central America ==
- Belize
- Costa Rica
- El Salvador
- Guatemala
- Honduras
- Nicaragua
- Panama

== South America ==
- Brazil
- Uruguay

== See also ==
- List of amphibians for lists organized by biological class, order and suborder
