= List of amphibians of the Indiana Dunes =

Indiana Dunes National Park is a National Park Service unit on the shore of Lake Michigan in Indiana, United States. A BioBlitz took place there on May 15 and 16, 2009. During that time, a list of organisms was compiled which included a preliminary listing of the (freshwater) amphibians of the area.

The park has completed numerous inventories over the years and has identified 18 unique species of amphibians within the park boundaries. The park represents the natural habitats along 25 miles of the Lake Michigan shoreline in Indiana.

== Salamanders (Caudata) ==
- Ambystoma (mole salamanders)
  - Ambystoma jeffersonianum – Jefferson salamander
  - Ambystoma laterale – blue-spotted salamander
  - Ambystoma tigrinum tigrinum – tiger salamander
- Plethodon cinereus – red-backed salamander

== Frogs and toads (Anura) ==
- Acris crepitans blanchardi – Blanchard's cricket frog
- Anaxyrus fowleri – Fowler's toad
- Bufo americanus, Anaxyrus americanus – American toad
- Hyla versicolor – gray treefrog
- Lithobates clamitans – northern green frog
- Pseudacris crucifer – spring peeper
- Pseudacris triseriata – western chorus frog
- Rana catesbeiana, Lithobates catesbeiana – American bullfrog
- Rana pipiens, Lithobates pipiens – northern leopard frog
- Rana sylvatica, Lithobates sylvaticus – wood frog

== Newts (Pleurodelinae) ==
- Notophthalmus viridescens louisianensis – eastern newt (Notophthalmus viridescens)
