= List of amphibians of Massachusetts =

This is a list of Massachusetts amphibians. It includes all amphibians currently found in Massachusetts. It does not include species found only in captivity. One species is identified as indicated below:

== Salamanders ==
Name	Species/Authority	Order	Family	Range and status	IUCN Red List
Common mudpuppy	Necturus maculosus	Salamander	Proteidae	Common; Introduced to the Connecticut River in 1936; However, there are records from the Connecticut River in Connecticut as early as 1875; The mudpuppy has also been reported from lakes in Berkshire County which probably means it is native to Western Massachusetts	
Jefferson salamander	Ambystoma jeffersonianum	Salamander	Ambystomatidae	Uncommon; Found mainly throughout Western Massachusetts; This amphibians range includes the blue spotted/Jefferson salamander hybrid, where both species interbreed and creates hybrids; It is a species of special concern in the Commonwealth due to habitat loss	
Blue-spotted salamander	Ambystoma laterale	Salamander	Ambystomatidae	Uncommon; Reported from Bristol County, Essex County, Middlesex County, Eastern Worcester County, and Norfolk County; Distinguished from most salamanders by its blue spots; Reports of Western Worcester county may represent the Jefferson salamander; Listed as special concern due to habitat loss	
Spotted salamander	Ambystoma maculatum	Salamander	Ambystomatidae	Common; Statewide except Nantucket	
Marbled salamander	Ambystoma opacum	Salamander	Ambystomatidae	Rare; Statewide except Cape Cod, Nantucket, and Dukes County; Threatened in the Commonwealth; There are old records from Plymouth and Essex counties; This species is difficult to locate, making it rare; The fact that Massachusetts is its almost northernmost limit of its range (it is also found in southern New Hampshire) makes it clear why its rare in the state	
Northern dusky salamander	Desmognathus fuscus	Salamander	Plethodontidae	Common; Statewide except Cape Cod, Dukes, and Nantucket counties	
Northern two-lined salamander	Eurycea bislineata	Salamander	Plethodontidae	Common; Statewide except Dukes County and Nantucket; Rare in Cape Cod	
Spring salamander	Gyrinophilus porphyriticus	Salamander	Plethodontidae	Locally common to uncommon; Found in Central and Western Massachusetts	
Four-toed salamander	Hemidactyllium scutatum	Salamander	Plethodontidae	Common but rarely seen; Statewide except possibly Suffolk county	
Eastern red-backed salamander	Plethodon cinereus	Salamander	Plethodontidae	Very common; Statewide	
Eastern newt	Notopthalmus viridescens	Salamander	Salamandridae	Common; Statewide except Nantucket	

== Frogs and toads ==
Name	Species/authority	Order	Family	Range and status	IUCN Red List
Eastern spadefoot	Scaphiopus holbrookii	Frog	Scaphiopodidae	Rare; Threatened in the Commonwealth; Most populations are found in Cape Cod and coastal Essex county, but it is also found in the Connecticut River Valley; Due to habitat loss, it is extirpated from inland Essex county, most of Martha Vineyard, and most of the Connecticut River	
American toad	Anaxyrus americanus	Frog	Bufonidae	Common; Statewide except Nantucket	
Fowler's toad	Anaxyrus fowleri	Frog	Bufonidae	Common; Formerly statewide; Extirpated from Nantucket, Cuttyhunk Island, Muskeget Island, and parts of Martha's Vineyard due to pesticides and pollution; A population still exists in Tuckernuck Island	
Gray treefrog	Hyla versicolor	Frog	Hylidae	Common; Statewide except possibly Nantucket	
Spring peeper	Pseudacris crucifer	Frog	Hylidae	Common; Statewide	
American bullfrog	Lithobates catesbeiana	Frog	Ranidae	Common; Statewide; Introduced to Nantucket	
American green frog	Lithobates clamitans	Frog	Ranidae	Common; Statewide	
Pickerel frog	Lithobates palustris	Frog	Ranidae	Common; Statewide	
Northern leopard frog	Lithobates pipiens	Frog	Ranidae	Uncommon; Declining; Statewide except Nantucket, Cape Cod, and Dukes County	
Southern leopard frog	Lithobates sphenocephala	Frog	Ranidae	Introduced; Specimens caught in various areas were probably escaped captives; may soon be established	
Wood frog	Lithobates sylvatica	Frog	Ranidae	Common; Statewide except Dukes County and Nantucket	
