= List of frogs and toads of New Jersey =

This is a list of frogs and toads known to be found in New Jersey.

== Frogs ==
| Image | Binomial Name | Name | Map |
|---|---|---|---|
| | Acris crepitans crepitans | Northern cricket frog | |
| | Hyla andersonii | Pine Barrens tree frog | |
| | Hyla chrysoscelis | Cope's gray treefrog | |
| | Hyla versicolor | Gray treefrog | |
| | Pseudacris crucifer | Spring peeper | |
| | Pseudacris feriarum | Upland chorus frog | |
| | Pseudacris triseriata kalmi | New Jersey chorus frog | |
| | Rana catesbeiana | American bullfrog | |
| | Rana clamitans | Green frog | |
| | Rana palustris | Pickerel frog | |
| | Rana sylvatica | Wood frog | |
| | Rana sphenocephala | Southern leopard frog | |
| | Rana virgatipes | Carpenter frog | |

== Toads ==
| Image | Binomial Name | Name | Map |
|---|---|---|---|
| | Bufo americanus | American toad | |
| | Bufo woodhousii fowleri | Fowler's toad | |
| | Scaphiopus holbrookii | Eastern spadefoot | |
