= List of amphibians of Pennsylvania =

This is a list of amphibians of Pennsylvania as listed by the Pennsylvania Fish and Boat Commission. Notes on ranges provided by Pennsylvania Amphibian & Reptile Survey. Pennsylvania has 41 native species of amphibians, with 23 salamanders and newts, and 18 species of frogs and toads. Of these species, 13 are of special concern, 2 are threatened, 6 are endangered, and 1 species is extirpated.

== Caudata - newts and salamanders ==
Family: Ambystomatidae - mole salamanders

Image	Common name	Scientific name	Status	Notes	Distribution
	Jefferson salamander	Ambystoma jeffersonianum (Green, 1827)	Species of special concern	Females of this species can form a unisexual form that cannot be identified to species level without DNA testing	Statewide, seemingly absent from near Philadelphia and the surrounding counties
	Blue-spotted salamander	Ambystoma laterale Hallowell, 1856	Endangered	Females of this species can form a unisexual form that cannot be identified to species level without DNA testing	Allegheny National Forest and surrounding areas; also a single record from Crawford County and Northampton County
	Spotted salamander	Ambystoma maculatum (Shaw, 1802)	Abundant		Statewide
	Marbled salamander	Ambystoma opacum (Gravenhorst, 1807)	Species of special concern		Primarily southeastern counties, extends into central counties, scattered records in eastern counties
	Tiger salamander	Ambystoma tigrinum (Green, 1825)	Extirpated	Females of this species can form a unisexual form that cannot be identified to species level without DNA testing	Formerly known from Allegheny County and Cumberland County, has not been recorded in over a century

Family: Cryptobranchidae - giant salamanders

Image	Common name	Scientific name	Status	Notes	Distribution
	Eastern hellbender	Cryptobranchus alleganiensis alleganiensis (Daudin, 1803)	Species of special concern	Nominate subspecies, state amphibian	Northern and western counties, scattered records through south-central counties

Family: Plethodontidae - lungless salamanders

Image	Common name	Scientific name	Status	Notes	Distribution
	Green salamander	Aneides aeneus (Cope & Packard, 1881)	Threatened		Fayette County
	Northern dusky salamander	Desmognathus fuscus (Rafinesque, 1820)	Abundant		Statewide
	Seal salamander	Desmognathus monticola Dunn, 1916	Species of special concern		Southwestern counties
	Allegheny Mountain dusky salamander	Desmognathus ochrophaeus Cope, 1859	Abundant		Statewide except southeast and some central counties
	Northern two-lined salamander	Eurycea bislineata (Green, 1818)	Abundant		Statewide
	Eastern long-tailed salamander	Eurycea longicauda longicauda (Green, 1818)	Abundant	Nominate subspecies	Statewide, but notably absent from Wayne County and Erie County
	Northern spring salamander	Gyrinophilus porphyriticus porphyriticus (Green, 1827)	Abundant	Nominate subspecies	Statewide except southeast
	Four-toed salamander	Hemidactylium scutatum (Tschudi, 1838)	Abundant		Statewide
	Eastern red-backed salamander	Plethodon cinereus (Green, 1818)	Abundant		Statewide
	Northern ravine salamander	Plethodon electromorphus Highton, 1999	Species of special concern		Southwestern counties
	Northern slimy salamander	Plethodon glutinosus (Green, 1818)	Abundant		Statewide
	Valley and ridge salamander	Plethodon hoffmani Highton, 1972	Species of special concern		Central and south-central counties
	Wehrle's salamander	Plethodon wehrlei Fowler and Dunn, 1917	Abundant		North-central and west-central counties
	Eastern mud salamander	Pseudotriton montanus montanus Baird, 1850	Endangered	Nominate subspecies	Franklin County and Cumberland County
	Northern red salamander	Pseudotriton ruber ruber (Latreille, 1801)	Abundant	Nominate subspecies	Statewide

Family: Proteidae - Mudpuppies

Image	Common name	Scientific name	Status	Notes	Distribution
	Common mudpuppy	Necturus maculosus maculosus (Rafinesque, 1818)	Species of special concern	Nominate subspecies	Western counties

Family: Salamandridae - Newts

Image	Common name	Scientific name	Status	Notes	Distribution
	Red-spotted newt	Notophthalmus viridescens viridescens (Rafinesque, 1820)	Abundant	Nominate subspecies	Statewide

== Anura - frogs and toads ==
Family: Bufonidae - true toads

Image	Common name	Scientific name	Status	Notes	Distribution
	Eastern American toad	Anaxyrus americanus americanus (Holbrook, 1836)	Abundant		Statewide
	Fowler's toad	Anaxyrus fowleri (Hinckley, 1882)	Species of special concern		Primarily eastern, with some scattered central and western observations and a notable population on Presque Isle State Park in Erie County

Family: Hylidae - tree frogs

Image	Common name	Scientific name	Status	Notes	Distribution
	Northern cricket frog	Acris crepitans Baird, 1854	Endangered	If subspecies are recognized, it would be the nominate subspecies Acris crepitans crepitans	Southeastern, south-central, and Luzerne County
	Cope's gray treefrog	Dryophytes chrysoscelis (Cope, 1880)	Species of special concern	Usually indistinguishable from Dryophytes versicolor without DNA analysis or analysis of mating call Sometimes placed in the genus Hyla	Southeastern and southwestern counties
	Gray treefrog	Dryophytes versicolor (Le Conte, 1825)	Abundant	Usually indistinguishable from Dryophytes chrysoscelis without DNA analysis or analysis of mating call Sometimes placed in the genus Hyla	Statewide, less common in southwestern counties
	Mountain chorus frog	Pseudacris brachyphona (Cope, 1889)	Species of special concern		Southwestern counties
	Spring peeper	Pseudacris crucifer (Wied-Neuwied, 1838)	Abundant		Statewide
	Upland chorus frog	Pseudacris feriarum Baird, 1854	Species of special concern		Central and south-central
	New Jersey chorus frog	Pseudacris kalmi Harper, 1855	Endangered		Bucks County and Montgomery County
	Western chorus frog	Pseudacris triseriata Wied-Neuwied, 1838	Species of special concern	Not officially seen in Pennsylvania since 1958 but present in New York and near the Ohio border	Western counties

Family: Ranidae - true frogs

Image	Common name	Scientific name	Status	Notes	Distribution
	American bullfrog	Lithobates catesbeianus (Shaw, 1802)	Abundant		Statewide
	Green frog	Lithobates clamitans (Rafinesque, 1820)	Abundant	If subspecies are recognized, the Pennsylvania subspecies would be Lithobates clamitans melanota	Statewide
	Atlantic Coast leopard frog	Lithobates kauffeldi (Feinberg et al., 2014)	Endangered		Bucks County, Philadelphia County, and Delaware County
	Pickerel frog	Lithobates palustris (Le Conte, 1825)	Abundant		Statewide
	Northern leopard frog	Lithobates pipiens (von Schreber, 1782)	Species of special concern		Scattered reports across the state, but more common to the west and especially the northwest, and also around Northumberland County
	Coastal Plains leopard frog	Lithobates sphenocephalus utricularius (Harlan, 1825)	Endangered		Southeasternmost counties
	Wood frog	Lithobates sylvaticus (Le Conte, 1825)	Abundant		Statewide

Family: Scaphiopodidae - American spadefoots

Image	Common name	Scientific name	Status	Notes	Distribution
	Eastern spadefoot	Scaphiopus holbrookii (Harlan, 1835)	Threatened		Central, south-central, and southeastern counties

== Nonnative species ==
Several species of frog have been introduced to Pennsylvania, mostly around the Philadelphia area.

- Cuban tree frog (Osteopilus septentrionalis) - recorded between Philadelphia and Greencastle
- Squirrel tree frog (Dryophytes squirella) - found between Philadelphia and Carlisle
- Green tree frog (Dryophytes cinerea) - reported between Philadelphia and Lebanon
