= List of amphibians of Arizona =

A map of Arizona

The following is a list of amphibians found in the state of Arizona. The Arizona tree frog is the state amphibian. The state is home to three salamander species.

Arizona is home to a wide variety of biotic systems as it is diverse topographically, geologically, and climatically. The area's sporadic mountains create "sky islands", wherein varying altitudes create drastically different environments inhabited by specific species. For example, the eastern barking frog is only found at altitudes of 1,280–1,890 m on Arizonan mountains. Although the state is mostly arid, river systems such as the Colorado River provide riparian habitats.

== List of species ==
=== Order Anura ===
==== Family Bufonidae ====
Bufonidae is a family of toads, often called the "true toads". Although a widely varied family, Bufonidae includes the stereotypical toad: dry warty skin and shortened forelimbs and hindlimbs. Bufonids also carry potent skin toxins, sometimes concentrated in the parotoid gland.

Bufonidae
| Species | Common name | Distribution | Status | Image |
|---|---|---|---|---|
| Anaxyrus cognatus | Great Plains toad | Found in playa wetlands in Arizona | LC | |
| Anaxyrus debilis | Green toad | Found in southeastern Arizona | LC | A green toad with black speckles |
| Anaxyrus microscaphus | Arizona toad | Found in the Virgin River basin of northwestern Arizona | LC | |
| Anaxyrus punctatus | Red-spotted toad | Abundant in central Arizona | LC | A light green frog with brown and black spots on its back |
| Anaxyrus woodhousii | Woodhouse's toad | Found throughout the state | LC | A brown frog with warty skin |

==== Family Hylidae ====
Hylidae is a family of frogs which are commonly found in the New World. They may be better known as tree frogs.

Hylidae
| Species | Common name | Distribution | Status | Image |
|---|---|---|---|---|
| Dryophytes arenicolor | Canyon tree frog | Inhaits arid environments and streambanks; often found in pools in canyons | LC | A dull brown frog sits on a rock surface |
| Dryophytes wrightorum | Wright's mountain tree frog | Found in the Petran Montane Conifer Forest Biome along the Mogollon Rim | | A green frog lies on mud between reeds |

==== Family Leptodactylidae ====
Leptodactylidae
| Species | Common name | Distribution | Status | Image |
|---|---|---|---|---|
| Craugastor augusti | Eastern barking frog | Found in the Santa Rita, Pajarito, Huachuca, and Quinlan Mountains in southeast Arizona at elevations of 1,280–1,890 m; report of specimen found in Sierra Ancha mountains of central Arizona | LC | A brown frog with black spots and large eyes |

==== Family Microhylidae ====
Microhylidae is a family of frogs. They can often be identified by their tear-dropped shape, hence the common name "narrow-mouthed frogs".

Microhylidae
| Species | Common name | Distribution | Status | Image |
|---|---|---|---|---|
| Gastrophryne olivacea | Great Plains narrowmouth frog | Inhabit south-central Arizona | LC | A greyish-brown frog rests on a leaf |

==== Family Ranidae ====
Ranidae, true frogs, are the largest family of frogs. Members of this family, called Ranids, typically have robust hindlimbs, toe webbing, and an aquatic tadpole stage.

Ranidae
| Species | Common name | Distribution | Status | Image |
|---|---|---|---|---|
| Lithobates berlandieri | Rio Grande leopard frog | Inhabit the Gila River drainage and associated croplands from Phoenix to the Colorado River confluence | LC | A brown patterned frog |
| Lithobates blairi | Plains leopard frog | An isolated population cluster in southeastern Arizona | LC | A brown patterned frog with a light underside |
| Lithobates catesbeianus | Bullfrog | Common in Arizona | LC | A bulky brown frog with green above its mouth and a yellow underside |

==== Family Scaphiopodidae ====
Scaphiopodidae are a family of frogs. Commonly called spadefoot frogs, they are often inconspicuously coloured. Members of this family are predominantly fossorial, living underground until rain arrives. To aid in digging, they have keratinized protrusions on their feet.

Scaphiopodidae
| Species | Common name | Distribution | Status | Image |
|---|---|---|---|---|
| Spea bombifrons | Plains spadefoot toad | Found in eastern Arizona | LC | A dark green frog with orange spots rests at the edge of a pond |
| Scaphiopus couchii | Couch's spadefoot toad | Central and southeastern portions of the state | LC | A brown patterned frog sits on a sandy surface |

=== Order Urodela ===
==== Family Ambystomatidae ====
Ambystomatidae
| Species | Common name | Distribution | Status | Image |
|---|---|---|---|---|
| Ambystoma mavortium | Barred tiger salamander | Introduced to southern Arizona | LC | A black salamander with green pattern on its back and yellowish white underside |
| Ambystoma rosaceum | Tarahumara salamander | Present in Arizona | LC | A black salamander with yellow spots |
| Ambystoma tigrinum | Eastern tiger salamander | Distinct subspecies Ambystoma tigrinum stebbinsi, known as the Sonora tiger Salamander found on southern border | LC | A pair of black salamanders sporting a yellow pattern and broad head |

== Notes and references ==
=== Notes ===
a: Conservation status at a world level of the species according to the IUCN Red List: Conservation status - IUCN Red List of Threatened Species:

EX - Extinct
EW - Extinct in the wild
CR - Critically endangered
EN - Endangered
VU - Vulnerable
NT - Near threatened
LC - Least concern
DD - Data deficient
NE - Not evaluated
