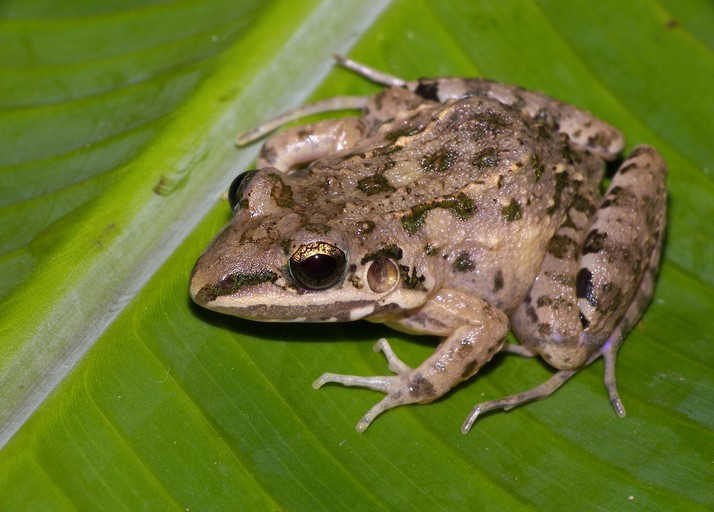

Conservation status
- Least Concern (IUCN 3.1)

Scientific classification
- Kingdom: Animalia
- Phylum: Chordata
- Class: Amphibia
- Order: Anura
- Family: Leptodactylidae
- Genus: Leptodactylus
- Species: L. fragilis

Binomial name
- Leptodactylus fragilis (Brocchi, 1877)

Synonyms
- Cystignathus fragilis Brocchi, 1877; Leptodactylus labialis Cope, 1878

= Leptodactylus fragilis =

Species of amphibian

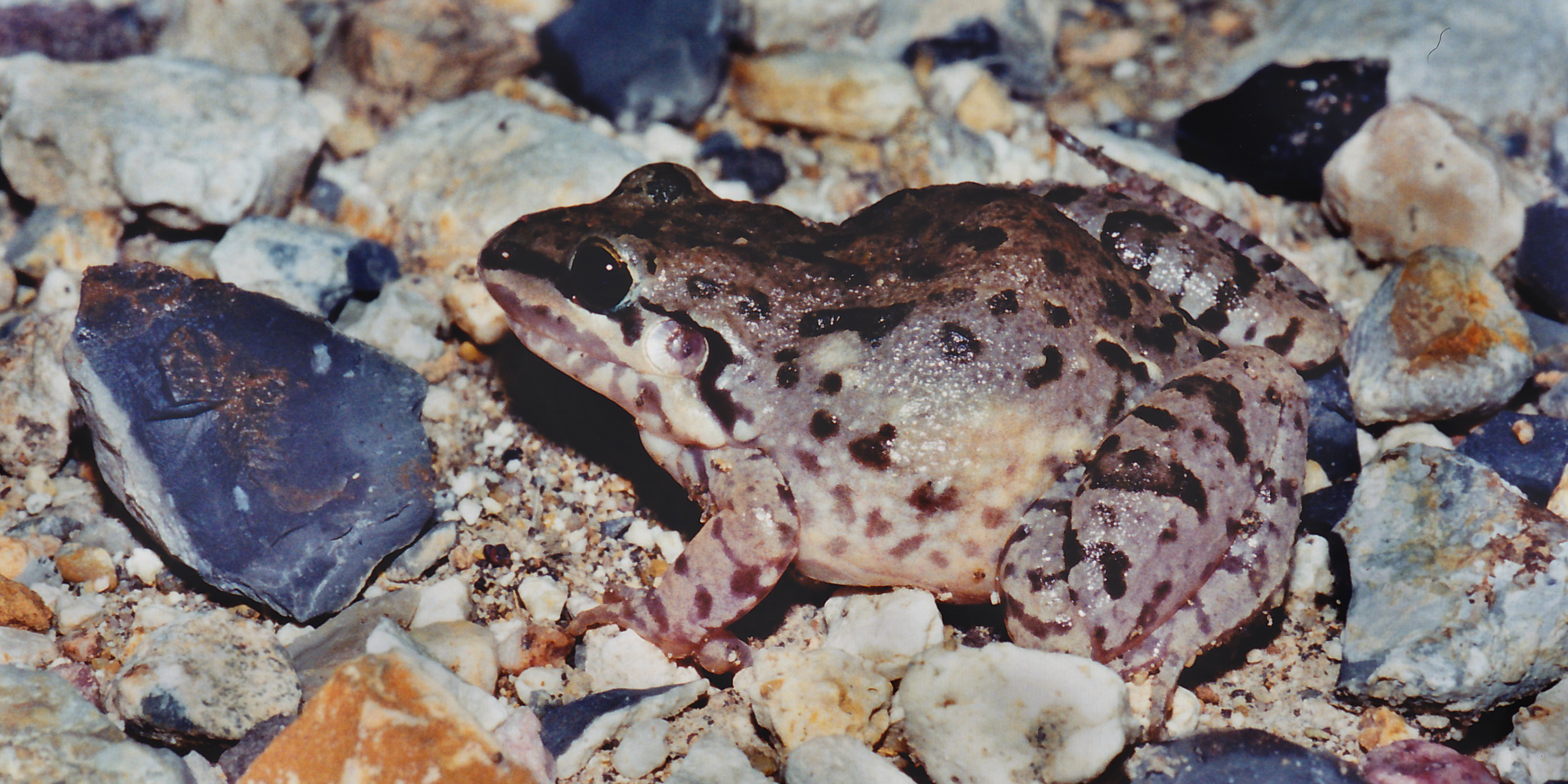
White-lipped Frog (Leptodactylus fragilis) Municipality of Victoria, Tamaulipas, Mexico (12 August 2003).

Leptodactylus fragilis, known under many common names such as the Mexican white-lipped frog, American white-lipped frog or simply white-lipped frog, is a species of leptodactylid frog. Its distribution ranges from the Lower Rio Grande Valley of Texas in the United States south through Mexico and Central America to Colombia and Venezuela. It is often—wrongly—referred to as Leptodactylus labialis (Cope, 1878) (or Leptodactylus mystaceus labialis Shreve, 1957), which is a junior synonym of Leptodactylus mystacinus.

== Description ==
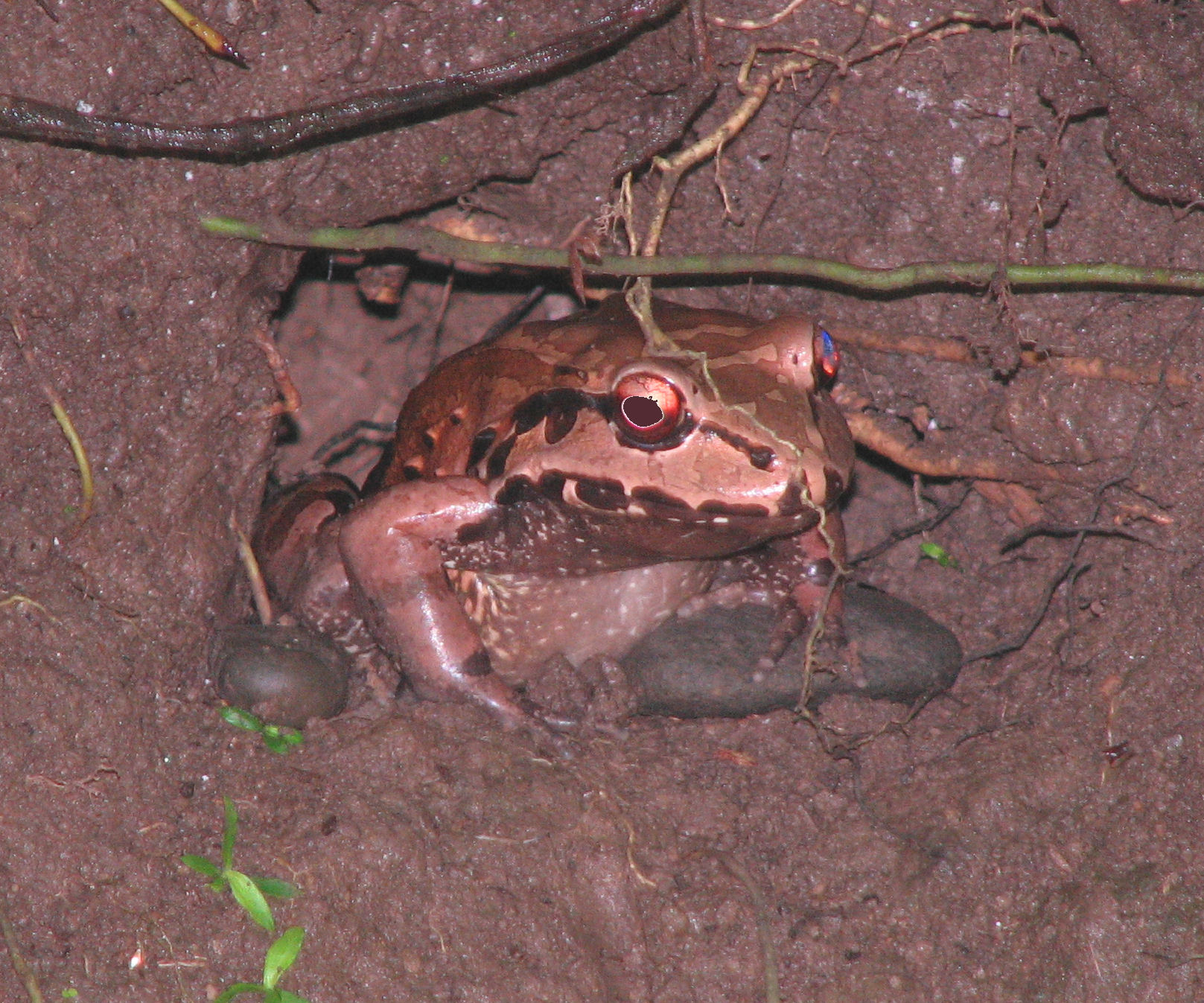
Leptodactylus fragilis in Manuel Antonio National Park, Costa Rica

Mexican white-lipped frogs are grey-brown in color with brown or black mottling. They have a distinctive white stripe along their upper lip which gives them their name. They grow to 3–5 cm (1.2–2.0 in) in length.

== Habitat ==
Mexican white-lipped frog is a widespread and common species found in a range of habitats, in savanna, grassland, semi-arid lands, and open habitats in humid and dry, lowland and montane tropical forests. It is often seen near water. Scientists have observed it as high as 1,530 metres (5,020 ft) above sea level.

== Behavior and reproduction ==
Mexican white-lipped frogs are nocturnal and carnivorous. During the heat of the day, they bury themselves in loose soil of roadside ditches, irrigated cropland, or grasslands, and emerge to feed in the evenings.
