= List of amphibians and reptiles of Norway =

The Kingdom of Norway is home to several species of reptiles and amphibians, despite its cold climate. According to the University of Bergen publication, "Today there is no active collecting of herptiles at the University Museum [of Bergen] and new material are mainly animals that have been found dead for various reasons."

== Reptiles ==
Scientific name	Norwegian common name	Description	Image
Anguis fragilis	Stålorm	slow worms are semifossorial (burrowing) lizards that spend their time hiding underneath objects.	
Coronella austriaca	Slettsnok	These snakes may bite people, although they are non-venomous.	
Dermochelys coriacea	Havlærskilpadde	The largest of all living turtles and the heaviest non-crocodilian reptile	
Natrix natrix	Buorm	The grass snake, ringed snake, or water snake, is a Eurasian semi-aquatic non-venomous colubrid snake. It is often found near water and feeds almost exclusively on amphibians.	
Vipera berus	Hoggorm	This snake is venomous but its bite is rarely fatal to humans.	A venomous snake common to Western Europe, the hoggorm is tan with a dark zigzag pattern down its back.
Zootoca vivipara	Nordfirfisle	This is one of the few lizards who gives birth to live offspring.	

== Amphibians ==
Scientific name	Norwegian common name	Description	Image
Bufo bufo	Nordpadde	a toad found throughout most of Europe	The common toad on grass.
Lissotriton vulgaris	Småsalamander	The newts' skins are dry and velvety when they are living on land, but become smooth when they migrate into the water to breed	
Triturus cristatus	Storsalamander	During the breeding season, males develop a conspicuous jagged crest on their back and tail.	
Rana arvalis	Spissnutefrosk	he frog makes use of various cryoprotectants i.e. antifreeze that decrease its internal freezing temperature.	
Rana temporaria	Buttsnutefrosk	frogs undergo metamorphosis through three distinct life stages — aquatic larva, terrestrial juvenile, and adult. They have plump bodies with rounded snouts, webbed feet, and long hind legs adapted for swimming and hopping on land.	
