= List of reptiles and amphibians of Alaska =

Alaska is the northwestern most part of North America. Reptiles and amphibians are not common in Alaska due to them being cold-blooded. Alaska has four reptile species and eight amphibian species. Two of these species are introduced. There are no snakes or lizards in Alaska.

== Reptiles ==
Order: Testudines - turtles and tortoises

Family: Cheloniidae - typical sea turtles

Image	Common name	Scientific name	Status	Notes	Distribution
	Loggerhead sea turtle	Caretta caretta (Linnaeus, 1758)	VU	Two sightings between 1960 and 2007	Gulf of Alaska
	Green sea turtle	Chelonia mydas (Linnaeus, 1758)	EN	15 sightings between 1960 and 2007	Gulf of Alaska
	Olive ridley sea turtle	Lepidochelys olivacea (Eschscholtz, 1829)	VU	Three sightings between 1960 and 2007	Gulf of Alaska

Family: Dermochelyidae - leatherback sea turtles

Image	Common name	Scientific name	Status	Notes	Distribution
	Leatherback sea turtle	Dermochelys coriacea (Vandelli, 1761)	VU	19 sightings between 1960 and 2007	Gulf of Alaska, Bristol Bay, southernmost of Bering Sea

== Amphibians ==
Order: Anura - frogs and toads

Family: Bufonidae - true toads

Image	Common name	Scientific name	Status	Notes	Distribution
	Western toad	Anaxyrus boreas (Baird & Girard, 1852)	LC		Southeast Alaska north to Prince William Sound

Family: Hylidae - tree frogs

Image	Common name	Scientific name	Status	Notes	Distribution
	Pacific chorus frog	Pseudacris regilla (Baird & Girard, 1852)	LC	Introduced to Alaska	Southern Revillagigedo Island and north of the city of Sitka on the Sitka Sound and north of Juneau

Family: Ranidae - true frogs

Image	Common name	Scientific name	Status	Notes	Distribution
	Wood frog	Lithobates sylvaticus (Le Conte, 1825)	LC	Sometimes placed in genus Rana	Statewide, except extreme north, Alaska Peninsula, and Aleutian Islands
	Northern red-legged frog	Rana aurora (Baird & Girard, 1852)	LC	Introduced to Alaska. Sometimes placed in genus Amerana	Introduced to northeastern Chichagof Island
	Columbia spotted frog	Rana luteiventris Thompson, 1913	LC	Sometimes placed in genus Amerana	Southeast Alaska

Order: Caudata - newts and salamanders

Family: Ambystomatidae - mole salamanders

Image	Common name	Scientific name	Status	Notes	Distribution
	Northwestern salamander	Ambystoma gracile (Baird, 1859)	LC		Southern Southeast Alaska
	Long-toed salamander	Ambystoma macrodactylum Baird, 1850	LC	subspecies Ambystoma macrodactylum columbianum	Southern Southeast Alaska

Family: Salamandridae - newts

Image	Common name	Scientific name	Status	Notes	Distribution
	Rough-skinned newt	Taricha granulosa (Skilton, 1849)	LC		Southeast Alaska

== Unconfirmed species ==
Two species are alleged to occur naturally in Alaska, but are not officially confirmed.

- Batrachoseps caudatus, the Alaska worm salamander, was described based on a specimen described by Edward Drinker Cope in 1889. It was described based on an individual allegedly captured on Annette Island; this is likely mislabeled and the specimen is from California, and represents the California slender salamander.
- The common garter snake, Thamnophis sirtalis, has allegedly been seen around the Taku River and Stikine River, but the snakes have never been officially recorded in the state.

Additionally, the tailed frog, Ascaphus truei, occurs in British Columbia until the Portland Inlet, and may occur in southernmost Alaska.
