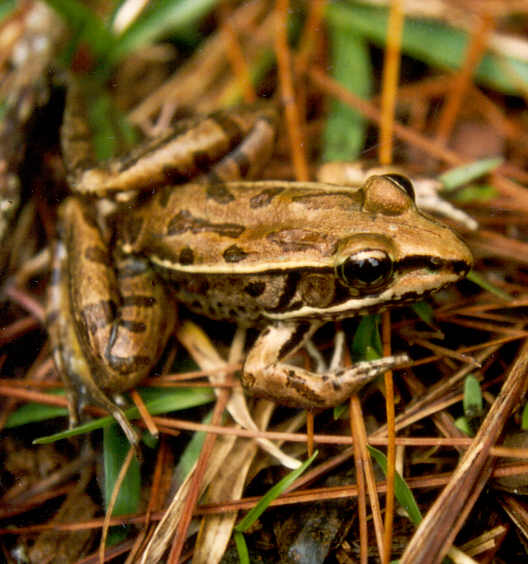

Conservation status
- Least Concern (IUCN 3.1)

- Secure (NatureServe)

Scientific classification
- Kingdom: Animalia
- Phylum: Chordata
- Class: Amphibia
- Order: Anura
- Family: Ranidae
- Genus: Lithobates
- Species: L. berlandieri

Binomial name
- Lithobates berlandieri (Baird, 1859)

Synonyms
- Rana berlandieri Rana halecina berlandieri Rana halecina austricola Rana virescens austricola Rana austricola Rana pipiens berlandieri Rana pipiens austricola

= Rio Grande leopard frog =

Species of amphibian

The Rio Grande leopard frog (Lithobates berlandieri or Rana berlandieri) is a species of aquatic frog native to the southern United States in Texas and New Mexico, and south through Mexico and Central America. It is also sometimes referred to as the Mexican leopard frog. The epithet berlandieri is in honor of the naturalist Jean Louis Berlandier, who worked for the Mexican government on one of the first biological surveys of Texas.

== Physical description ==
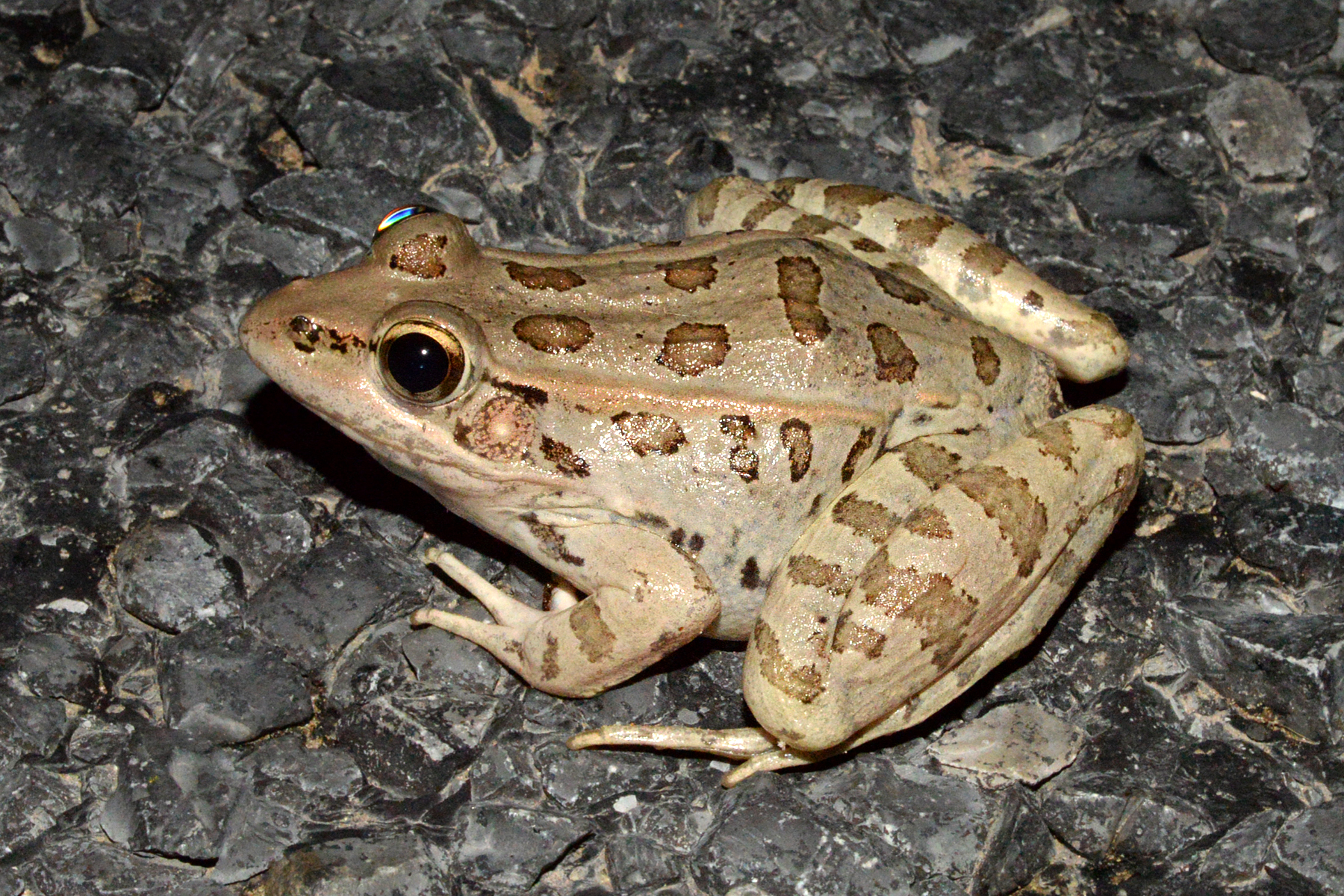
Rio Grande leopard frog (Lithobates berlandieri), from Cameron County, Texas, USA

Rio Grande leopard frogs grow from 2.2 to 4.5 inches (5.6 to 11.4 cm) in length. They are usually tan, brown, or pale green in color, with distinctive black spotting with prominent light-colored ridges down either side of their backs. Their noses are angular, and they have long, powerful legs with webbed feet.

== Ecology and behavior ==
The species is primarily aquatic, and mostly nocturnal, though they can be often found during the day resting along the edge of the water. Despite their geographic range being mostly arid or semiarid, they inhabit permanent water sources, such as streams, creeks, and ponds. They are insectivorous, but like most frogs, will eat almost anything they can overpower and swallow. Mating occurs during the rainy periods of the spring and fall. The males make a rattling call which is loud enough to be heard a quarter mile or more away. Eggs are laid in large masses attached to aquatic vegetation.

== Taxonomy ==
The Rio Grande leopard frog was once considered a subspecies of the northern leopard frog, but was later recognized as a distinct species due to distinct mating call and morphological differences. Recent research has placed Rio Grande leopard frogs in the Scurrilirana species group of the subgenus Pantherana.

== Geographic range and status ==
Found from Central Texas to New Mexico (where it is listed as vulnerable), south to Mexico through the Yucatán Peninsula, Belize, Guatemala, and Honduras to northeastern Nicaragua, its presence uncertain in El Salvador.

It is easily confused with other species that share its range, such as the Plains leopard frog (Lithobates blairi). It is unknown whether hybridization occurs. The species has also been introduced to the Colorado River in California and Arizona, and is known to be expanding its range south into Mexico in the state of Baja California. It is believed to be contributing to the population reduction of the lowland leopard frog (Lithobates yavapaiensis), which is native to the region. This expansion of range is the primary factor in the Rio Grande leopard frog being classified as least concern, by the IUCN Red List.
