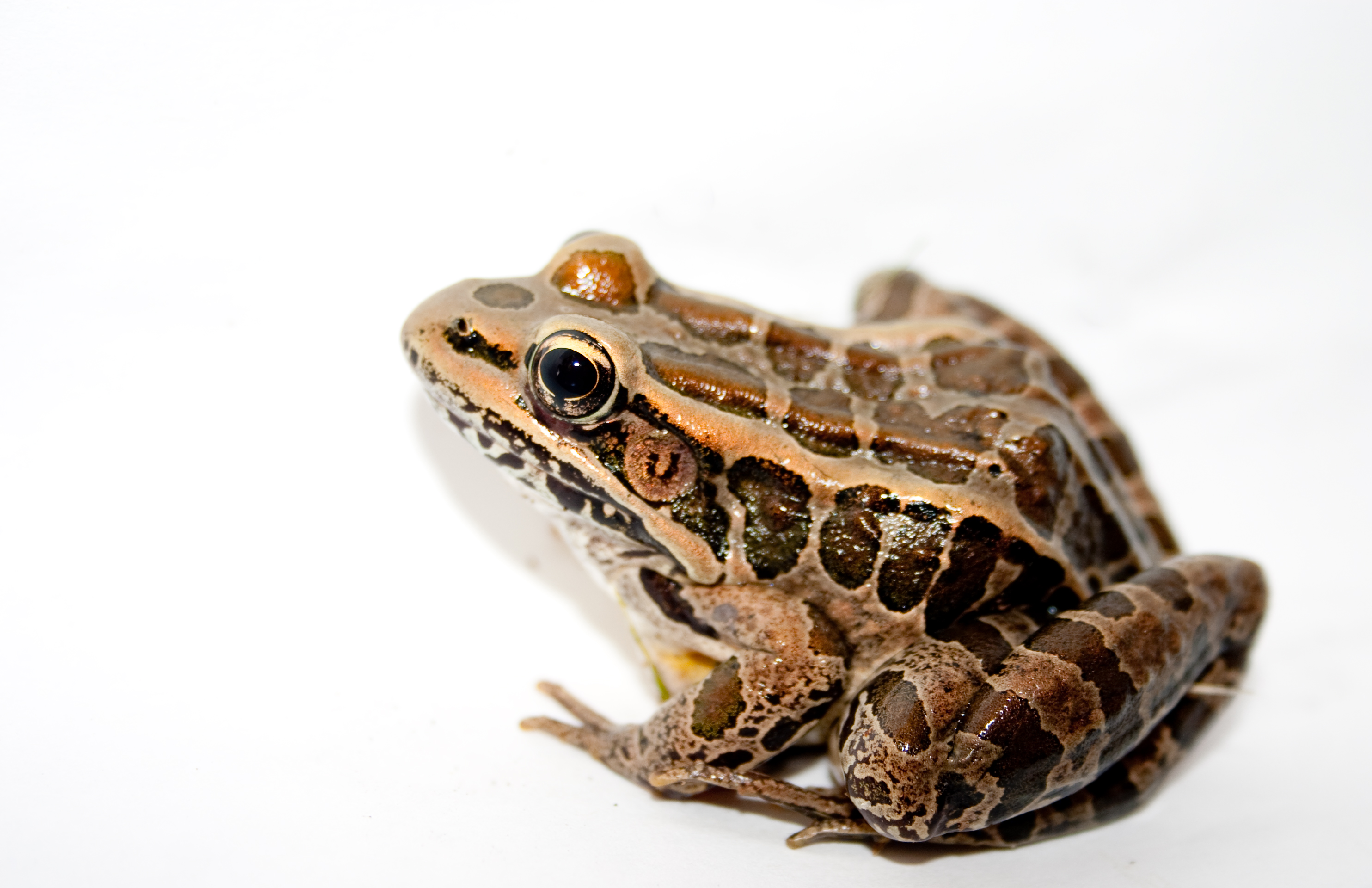

Conservation status
- Least Concern (IUCN 3.1)

- Secure (NatureServe)

Scientific classification
- Kingdom: Animalia
- Phylum: Chordata
- Class: Amphibia
- Order: Anura
- Family: Ranidae
- Genus: Lithobates
- Species: L. palustris

Binomial name
- Lithobates palustris (Le Conte, 1825)
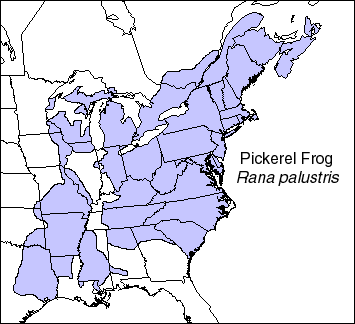
- Pickerel frog range

Synonyms
- Rana palustris LeConte, 1825; Rana pardalis Harlan, 1826

= Pickerel frog =

Species of amphibian

The pickerel frog (Lithobates palustris, formerly Rana palustris) is a North American frog, characterized by the appearance of seemingly "hand-drawn" squares on its dorsal surface.

== Distinguishing features ==
The pickerel frog is a large gray or tan frog marked with seven to twenty-one irregular rectangular dark brown spots which are oriented in two columns down its back. The average number of square markings has been found to vary based on geographic regions. The distinctive rectangular spots of the pickerel frog may blend together to form a long rectangle along the back. All leopard frogs have circular spots. In addition, pickerel frogs have prominent dorsolateral ridges that are unbroken. Another important distinguishing mark is the orange or yellow flash pattern found on the inner surface of the hind legs of pickerel frogs. The frog must be picked up to examine this, as the legs cover the coloration otherwise. The plains leopard frog (Lithobates blairi) exhibits this coloration as well, but the dorsolateral ridges are interrupted and inset medially in that species. The front toes of pickerel frogs are not webbed, a morphological characteristic for some frogs of the genus Rana and some frogs of the genus Lithobates. This allows pickerel frogs to be fit for terrestrial life.

=== Sexual dimorphism ===
Pickerel frogs display sexual dimorphism; the females are typically larger and darker in color than the males. During the summer and breeding season males can be recognized by their swollen thumbs. Males also have internal vocal sacs located between the tympanum and the foreleg. In general, secondary sexual characteristic are not typically evident outside of the breeding season; therefore, pickerel frogs can be rather difficult to sex.

== Range ==
The pickerel frog ranges in the west from much they are of Wisconsin, southeast Minnesota, eastern Iowa, through Missouri and down to eastern Texas. To the east they extend through northern Louisiana, most of Mississippi, northern Alabama, Georgia, and South Carolina to the coast. Their northern range extends into Canada in the southern reaches of Ontario, Quebec, New Brunswick, and Nova Scotia. The range is spotty through the midwestern states and a field guide should be obtained for the specifics on ranges in a particular area. This frog has also been spotted in Newfoundland and Labrador, Canada.

== Habitat ==
Pickerel frogs have varied habitats, the northern populations prefer to live near cold, clear water. They prefer rocky ravines, bogs and meadow streams, but can be found around lakes and rivers that are heavily wooded. In a study on amphibians in Canada, pickerel frogs were negatively associated with young forest stands. Pickerel frogs in the southern portion of their range prefer warmer waters, like those of the Coastal Plain and floodplain swamps. They are seen most often along the edges of streams, lakes, rivers, and even flooded ditches. During the winter months they will hibernate under the silt and debris in their aquatic environments; they are usually only active from April to October. When feasible, this species utilizes caves for thermal refugia during the coldest months of the year. The pickerel frog is a trogloxene species, meaning they occur in caves, but are unable to complete their life cycles there. Though they are most abundant in caves during the winter, they are active deep within caves at almost any time of year. When temperatures get too cold, this species will inhabit hibernacula. These hibernacula are commonly found nearby one another in the center of the cave. Pickerel frogs will sometimes inhabit those same caves during hot summers.

=== Breeding habitat ===
Pickerel frogs prefer cool, clear water. They breed in both temporary ponds and permanent ponds, but appear to favor ponds with long to permanent hydroperiods. In Rhode Island specifically, pickerel frog tadpoles and egg masses were found in permanent manmade rural ponds, farm ponds, and urban ponds surrounded by roads; all of the mentioned habitats were well-vegetated.

== Reproduction ==
Pickerel frogs typically emerge from hibernation around the end of March with the majority of the frogs arriving at breeding ponds by early May. No fall reproduction has been reported for this species. At the ponds, pickerel frogs are usually observed in large groups in the water. Mating behavior is not much different from other ranids. The males initiate breeding by emitting their low pitched call; this call is usually so low pitched that it is often not heard during calling surveys. Males can alter their call type based on interactions with other males. Males are known to call while submerged, although this is often inaudible in the air. Calls underwater vary among populations, suggesting that under certain circumstances it is better to vocalize underwater than into the air. Frogs reproduce by external fertilization while engaging in a behavior called amplexus; sometimes amplexus will last more than a day or two, even after the female has deposited the eggs. During the breeding season, males tend to lose body mass (with larger males losing more than smaller males).

=== Egg mass ===
Egg masses are typically laid in well-vegetated areas and are often difficult to locate. The masses superficially resemble those of wood frogs but at close inspection one can usually distinguish between the two. Pickerel frog egg masses are spherical and about the same size of a wood frog egg mass—roughly 5–10 cm in diameter—although pickerel frog egg masses contain more eggs, about 2000–3000. Pickerel frog eggs are multicolored: they are dark brown on top and cream colored on the bottom. The egg masses adhere to woody or herbaceous vegetation, varying in depth from a few centimeters below the surface to four feet (1.2 m) deep. Like in most amphibians egg development is temperature dependent, but pickerel frog eggs usually hatch in 11–21 days.

=== Larvae ===
The tadpole stage lasts roughly three months. Small pickerel tadpoles are yellowish to yellowish brown in color; as they grow their color changes to an olive green, which eventually changes to gray brown on top and cream colored underneath. Larger tadpole are often mistaken as green frogs. There are a few characteristics to aid in distinguishing between pickerel and green tadpoles. The nose of the pickerel frog tadpole is more pointed, the eyes are closer together, and the nostrils are closer to the edge of the nose.

=== Metamorphs ===
This is the stage where frogs have all four limbs and are able to walk on land, but still have their tails. They are not quite juvenile frogs. Metamorphs are roughly 2.6 cm long, but they are nearly as agile as the adult and juvenile when they emerge from the ponds. They are often mistaken for the closely related leopard frog. Larger tadpoles complete metamorphosis more efficiently because they used less energy total for the process than smaller tadpoles but energy costs are actually positively correlated with tadpole mass and duration of metamorphosis.

== Diet ==
The pickerel frog's diet consists of ants, spiders, various bugs, beetles, sawfly larvae, and other invertebrates. In order to catch their prey pickerel frogs will often search grassy areas next to bodies of water.

== Defense mechanism ==
In case of attack, pickerel frogs have a defense mechanism: they emit skin secretions which are irritating to people and toxic to some predators; making the pickerel frog one of the only poisonous frog species native to the United States. A peptidomic analysis of the defensive skin secretion have established the presence of canonical bradykinin and multiple bradykinin-related peptides. Due to its poison, most mammals, birds, snakes and other frogs will leave the pickerel frog alone. The skin secretions of a stressed pickerel frog are known to be toxic to other frogs, as many a novice frog catcher has found when they find only the pickerel frog still alive in their bucket. These secretions can also be moderately irritating if they come in contact with the eyes, mucous membranes, or broken skin.

The tadpole of this species is considered unpalatable to many species that would commonly predate on tadpoles. They also exhibit behaviors to avoid predation. To avoid fish, the tadpoles will move to stream margins in order to make them inaccessible to the fish. The tadpoles will also reduce activity after sensing a fish's chemical cues.

=== Predators ===
The pickerel frog's poisonous secretions cannot stop all creatures; green frogs, bull frogs, northern water snakes, eastern ribbon snakes, and common garter snakes are their usual predators. When threatened, pickerel frogs will jump into the water and dive to the bottom to escape predators like birds and snakes.
