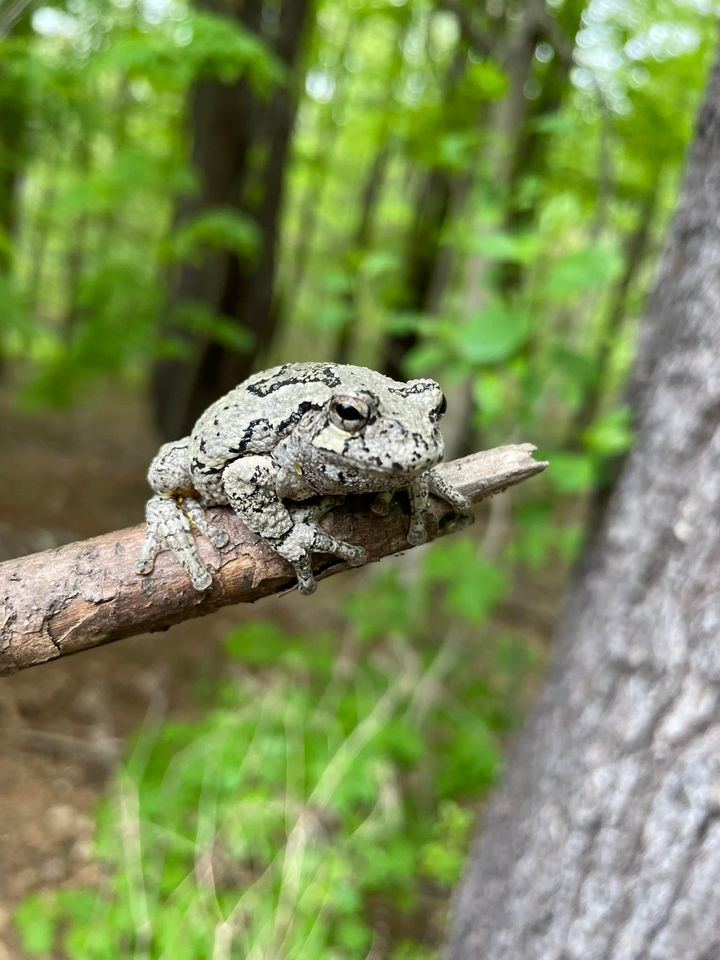

Conservation status
- Least Concern (IUCN 3.1)

- Secure (NatureServe)

Scientific classification
- Kingdom: Animalia
- Phylum: Chordata
- Class: Amphibia
- Order: Anura
- Family: Hylidae
- Genus: Dryophytes
- Species: D. versicolor

Binomial name
- Dryophytes versicolor (Le Conte, 1825)
- Range of D. versicolor

Synonyms
- Hyla versicolor LeConte, 1825

Audio

= Gray treefrog =

Species of amphibian

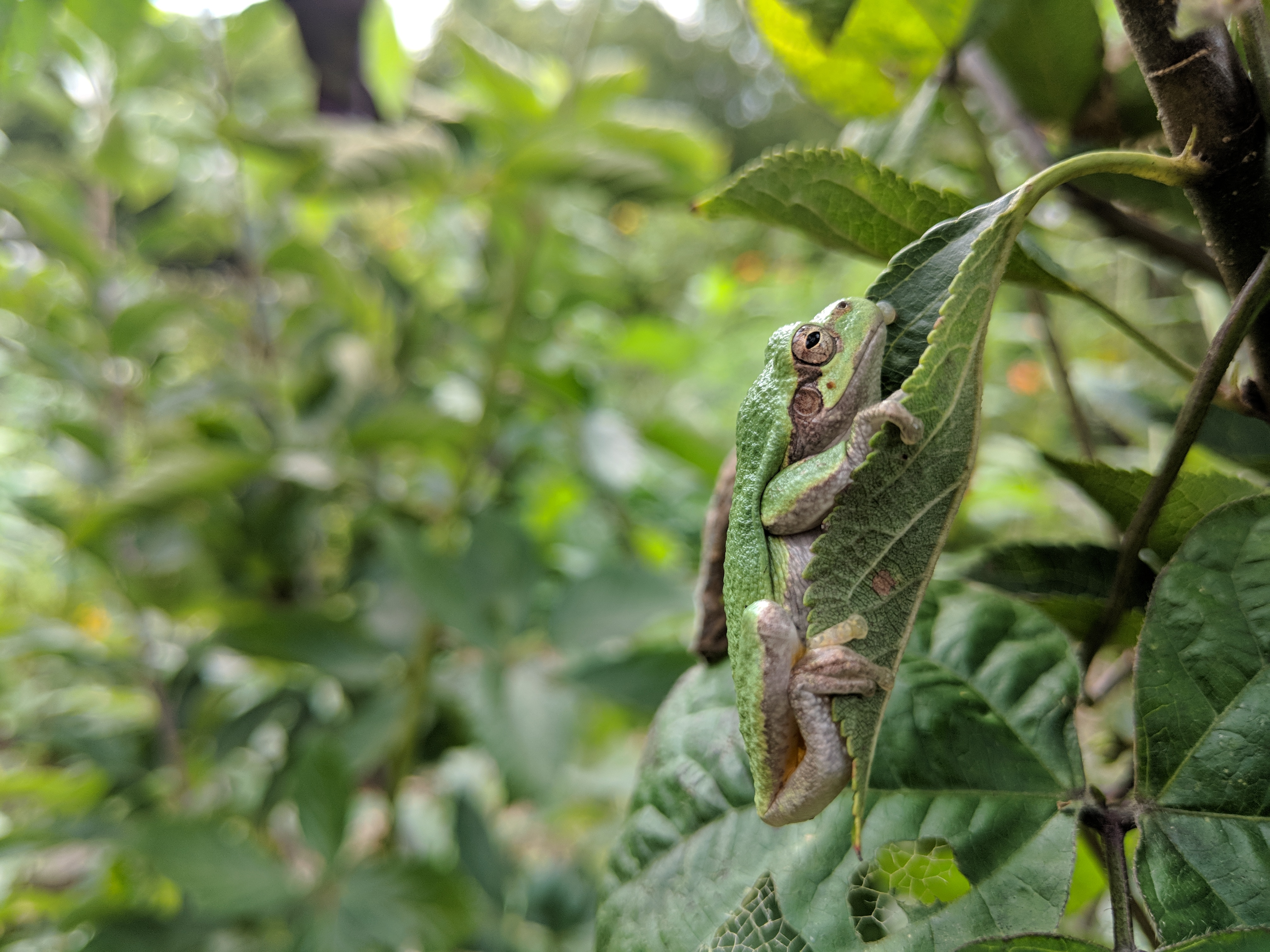
Gray tree frog on an apple tree, central US

The gray treefrog (Dryophytes versicolor) is a species of small arboreal frog in the family Hylidae. The species is native to much of the eastern United States and southeastern Canada.

It is sometimes referred to as the eastern gray treefrog, northern gray treefrog, common gray treefrog, or tetraploid gray treefrog to distinguish it from its more southern, genetically distinct relative, Cope's gray treefrog.

== Description ==
As the specific name versicolor implies, the gray treefrog is variable in color. This ability to vary its color provides it with the ability to camouflage itself from gray to green or brown, depending on the environment around it. Dryophytes versicolor can change from nearly black to nearly white. It changes color at a slower rate than a chameleon. A unique aspect of the appearance of the gray treefrog is that its legs feature a dark band-like pattern which then contrast sharply with the black-marked bright yellow or orange under the sides of its legs and arms. Dead gray treefrogs and ones in unnatural surroundings are predominantly gray. The female does not call; however, the male does call. The female gray treefrog is usually larger than its male counterpart. The gray treefrog is relatively small compared to other North American frog species, typically attaining no more than 1.5 to 2 in (3.8 to 5.1 cm) in snout-to-vent length (SVL). The skin has a lumpy texture to it, giving it a warty appearance.

This species is virtually indistinguishable from Cope's gray treefrog, the only readily noticeable difference being that Cope's gray treefrog has a shorter, faster call. This varies depending on the temperature, however, as the call rates of both gray treefrogs are temperature dependent. At lower temperatures, Cope's gray treefrog can have a call rate approximating that of the gray treefrog. This difference in calling can be heard, but it is best quantified by counting the number of pulses per second in their whistled trills. At usual temperatures, the gray treefrog has a pulse rate of 16 to 34 pulses per second, while Cope's gray treefrog has a pulse rate of 34 to 60 pulses per second. Even though there is potential for overlap, because of the temperature dependence of the pulse frequency the two species are easily distinguished where they occur together. At a given temperature, the pulse frequency for the gray treefrog is approximately one-half that of Cope's gray treefrog.

The gray treefrog has 48 chromosomes (4n), and is sometimes referred to as the tetraploid gray treefrog in scientific literature. Cope's gray treefrog, or the diploid gray treefrog, retained its 2n (24) original chromosome count. Hybridization between these species results in early mortality of many larvae. Some individuals survive to adulthood, but these individuals suffer from reduced fertility.

Both of these similar species have bright-yellow patches on their hind legs, which distinguishes them from other treefrogs, such as the bird-voiced tree frog. The bright patches are normally only visible while the frog is jumping. Both species of gray treefrogs are slightly sexually dimorphic. Males have black or gray throats, while the throats of the females are lighter.

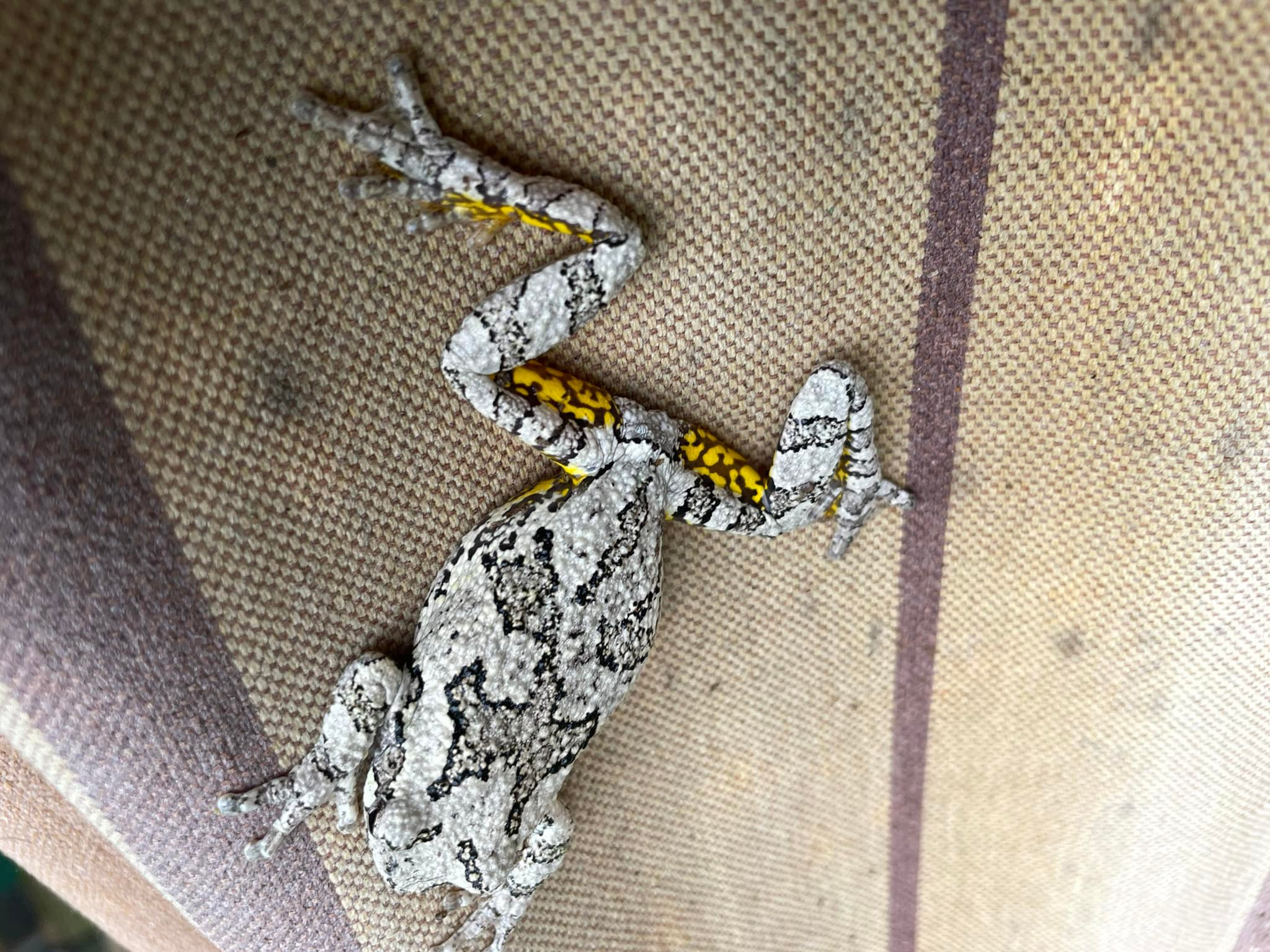
Yellow hind legs of a gray tree frog

Tadpoles have rounded bodies (as opposed to the more elongated bodies of stream species) with high, wide tails that can be colored red if predators are in the system. Metamorphosis can occur as quickly as two months with optimal conditions. During metamorphosis, the new froglets will almost always turn green for a day or two before changing to the more common gray. Young frogs will also sometimes maintain a light green color, only turning gray or darker green once adulthood is reached.

== Distribution and habitat ==
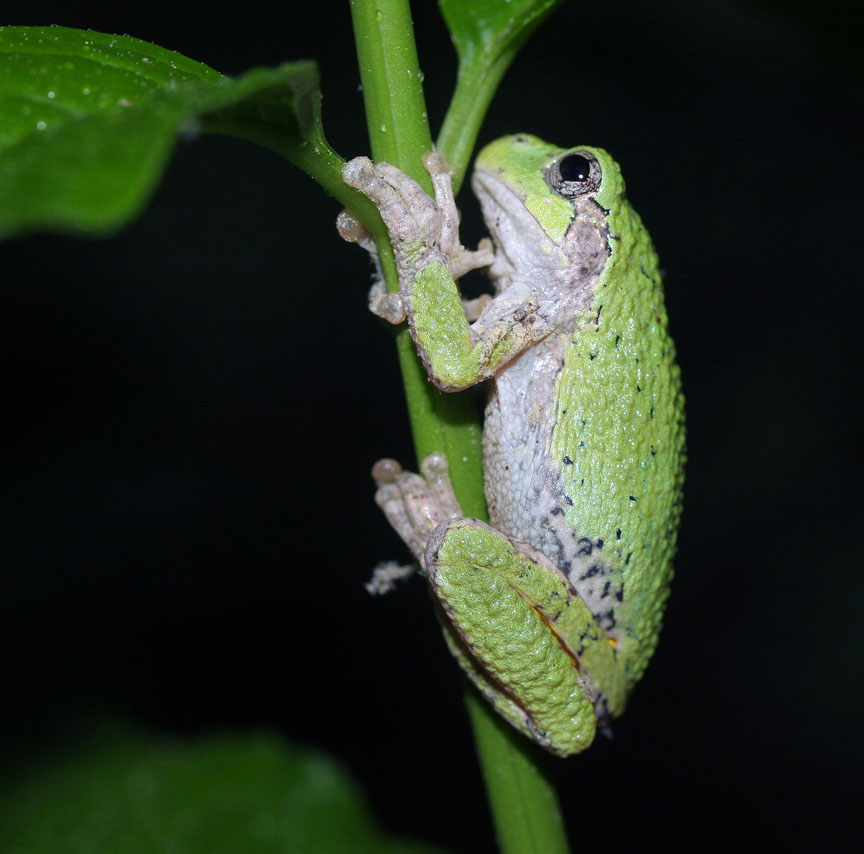

Video of gray treefrogs breeding and laying eggs

The gray treefrog inhabits a wide geographic range, and can be found in most of the eastern half of the United States and as far west as central Texas and Oklahoma. It also ranges into Canada in the provinces of Quebec, Ontario, and Manitoba, with an isolated population in New Brunswick.

The gray treefrog is capable of surviving freezing of its internal body fluids to temperatures as low as −8 °C (18 °F). However, when exposed to Batrachochytrium dendrobatidis, a fungal pathogen responsible for global amphibian declines, their critical temperature minimum increases, resulting in reduced cold tolerance and a greater possibility for overwintering mortality.

The gray treefrog is most common in forested areas, as it is highly arboreal. Its calls are often heard in rural residential areas of the East Coast and the Midwest. It prefers to breed in semipermanent woodland ponds without fish, but it also lays eggs in swamps, vernal pools, man-made fountains and water gardens, and even in rainwater-filled swimming pool covers.

== Behavior ==
Male gray treefrogs rarely have large choruses, as they are mostly solitary animals, but might vocalize competitively at the height of breeding periods. The gray treefrog has been observed to congregate around windows and porch lights to eat insects that are attracted to the light. Insect larvae, mites, spiders, plant lice, harvestmen, and snails also contribute towards the diet of the gray treefrog. Some populations have a diet high in ants and beetles. However, like most frogs, Dryophytes versicolor is opportunistic and may also eat smaller frogs, including other treefrogs. There is a positive correlation between the mass of the frog's stomach contents and the distance from the pond: more beetles were found in the frog's stomach at increasing distances from the pond. During the day, it often rests on horizontal tree branches or leaves out in the open. The gray treefrog has also been observed to lie out in the direct sun. The gray tree frog is less prone to overheating and desiccation than other amphibians and relies on its camouflage to hide itself from predators.

== Mating ==
=== Mate searching behavior ===
Research on anuran communication reveals that a group chorus of male frogs attracts female frogs to mate. The relative success of these male frogs, including Dryophytes versicolor males, at attracting females depends on how their advertisement call is able to lead females to their calling space. As male density increases, a male's advertisement call is confused with the other calls. This confusion leads to the inability of females to accurately locate the origin of the call. The lowest intensity of a neighbor's call that a male frog is tolerant of is known as the aggressive threshold. When this threshold is reached, a male frog will use a different call known as an aggressive call to initiate male-male conflict or intolerance.

Aggressive calls are usually much shorter in length and have lower frequencies than advertisement calls. Aggressive calls specifically in D. versicolor males also do not show much variation in amplitude throughout the call, unlike advertisement calls which contain many pulses. This is unique to the D. versicolor species since most species with graded aggressive calls have advertisement and aggressive calls with very similar structures. They are similar in that they both have two peak frequencies, but the aggressive call peak frequencies are usually lower.

=== Male/male interactions ===
Since females do not prefer call overlap between males in a close range of each other, this can cause a change in call-timing as well as a change in the characteristics of the calls these males produce. When there are other male frogs calling, D. versicolor males will adjust the timing of their calls; however, this is done in a much less strict fashion than most frog species. Compared to other species, D. versicolor does not exhibit selective attention. Selective attention is the phenomenon observed in many chorusing male frog species to change the timing of their calls to reduce overlap based on their loudest one or two neighboring male competitors, while ignoring the timing of other calls farther away. Instead, D. versicolor males will avoid call overlap when paired with only one other male, but will not actively avoid overlap with adjacent frogs in a group nearly as much as other frog species do. In response to increased competition, males can change the timing of their calls, but also change the characteristics of their calls. As surrounding competition increases, males will increase the length of their advertisement calls, but produce those calls less often since each call requires more energy to produce. But call amplitude and call frequency do not change as the amount of surrounding competition changes.

When males get closer and there is infiltration of each others territories, there are increased chances of aggressive encounters. This results in males engaging in conflict with one another through aggressive calls. The timing of these aggressive calls changes as distance from the intended recipient varies.

Conflict between two D. versicolor males will begin with trading advertisement calls between each other. Even though advertisement calls are primarily used to attract females, they still play a role in male-male interactions. Rarely the conflict escalates from this point and transitions into the exchange of aggressive calls and only in few cases will conflict result in physical contact.

=== Female/male interactions ===
==== Mate choice ====
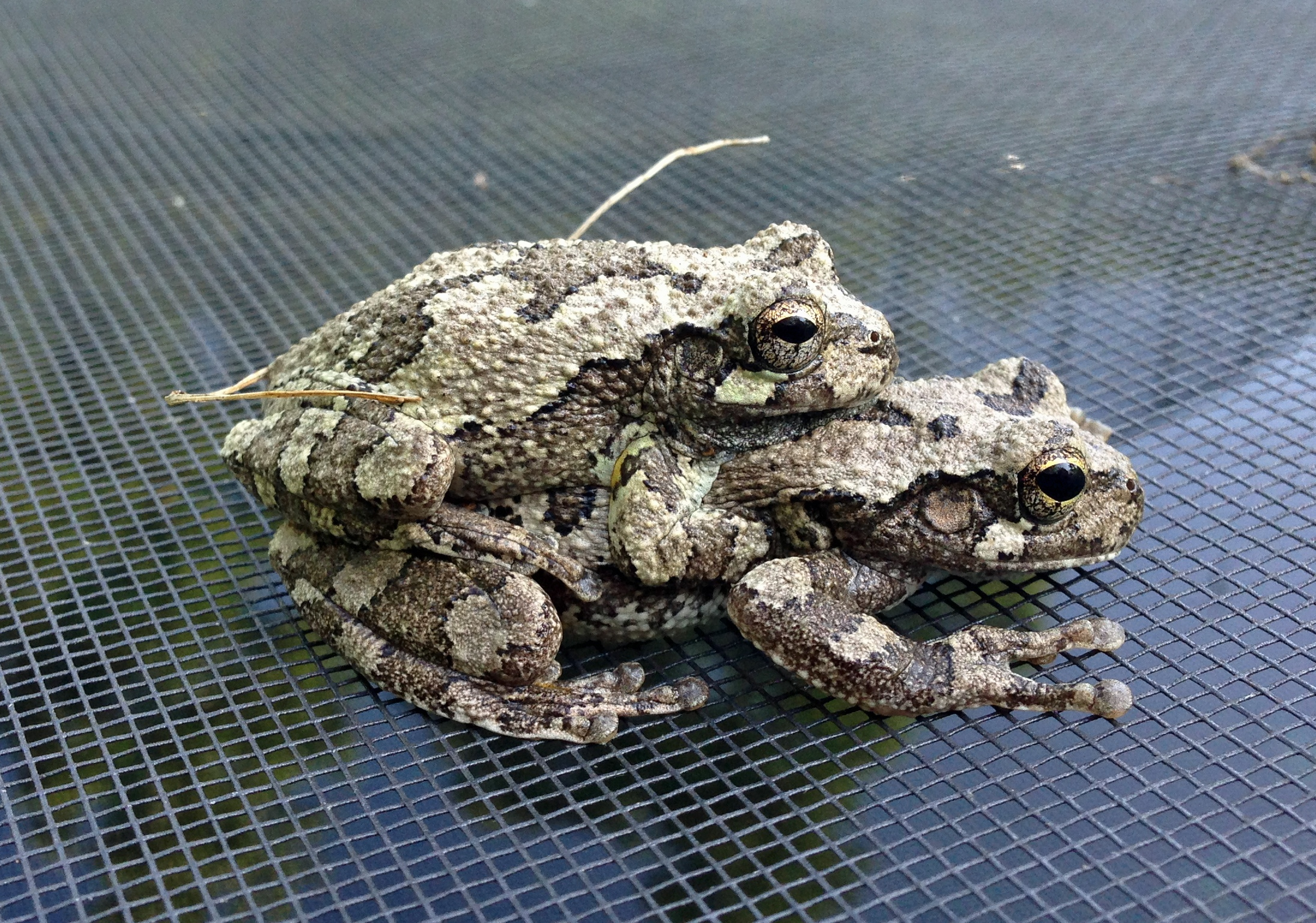
D. versicolor in amplexus

Unlike most species, D. versicolor females do not prefer leading calls, but they do prefer leading pulses if there is call overlap between males. Overall, females prefer no call overlap. However, increased distance between males producing overlapping calls may reduce the females' disinclination to choose those potential mates. The distance between the males allows the female to distinguish calls, whereas closely overlapping calls make two individual males harder to distinguish by sound. This means that D. versicolor males are not as dependent on specific timed-call responses and initiations to increase mating attractiveness compared to other chorus anurans and insects. Instead, D. versicolor males can allow call-timing to be more dependent on other things, like the social environment and male competition.

D. versicolor females are not usually attracted to aggressive calls no matter the range they are produced in, but may occasionally be attracted to aggressive calls. Females also exhibit no preference within the range of advertisement call frequencies, generally preferring advertisement calls over aggressive ones. There is a range of advertisement and aggressive call frequencies because D. versicolor males are capable of producing certain frequencies based on their size and properties of their vocal structures.

Females are more attracted to longer male calls, which is supported by their preference for advertisement calls over aggressive ones. Aggressive calls from nearby males do not reduce the attractiveness of advertisement calls from a given other male.

==== Courting ====
Male frogs will change their vocalizations when female frogs move closer to them. They do this in order to increase the likelihood that their advertisement call is received by a female over the other noise and vocalizations that could obscure it. D. versicolor males specifically do this by increasing the length of their calls to several lengths of a normal advertisement call. Males will also lengthen the duration of their calls when they see a female or sense them through touch. Females will initiate the mating position by touching the male frog resulting in the male frog vocalizing one or two especially long calls, known as courting calls.

== Social behavior ==
=== Adult sociality ===
Dryophytes versicolor males are known to follow a similar pattern that is seen in other species termed graded aggressive calling. Compared to aggressive calls, D. versicolor male aggressive calls are a lower frequency than advertisement calls. However, they decrease the frequency of their aggressive calls as the aggressiveness with another male rises. This gradient in frequencies allows their calls to efficiently balance energy costs of calling and when intense calling is necessary during male-male conflict. The energetic cost of producing vocalizations increases if there is any shift from a male's individual natural frequency. That being said, there is more of an energetic cost for low frequency and frequency decreasing calls than higher frequency ones, so this could be an explanation for why these types of calls are usually reserved for the most intense conflict.

Graded aggressive calling and a lower need to avoid call overlap allows D. versicolor males to have more freedom in the types of calls they produce. More freedom in call-timing also allows D. versicolor males to use advertisement call-overlap to signal the beginning of rising levels of aggressiveness between two males. Increasing overlapping calls can also be a response to an increase in the level of male competition or might simply be because call overlap increases as males communicate with each other for a longer period of time. For the same reason why males respond with call overlap in areas with the most acoustic competition, males in high density call choruses also produce the highest levels of overlapping calls with male frogs closest to them.

=== Group living ===
Male aggressive calling not only is affected by mating and their need to defend their calling space but is also affected by social communication with other aggressive males. The social environment can change as male callers move around and as females arrive to assess their potential mates producing different levels of perceived male competition heard by D. versicolor males. In particular, the social environment surrounding a male responding to an intruder will affect the intensity of the responding aggressive calls produced. This idea of a social environment affecting aggressive call output arose in this frog species from research that examined the relationship between aggressive call intensity in environments with an intruder versus and environment with other surrounding male competitors. With that being said, the effect of the social environment is more complex and requires further research. There are effects of other male competition on a male's advertisement call timing in the gray tree frog. As males get closer to another males calling space, they become more aggravated by another male infiltrating their calling space. This results in males engaging in conflict with one another through aggressive calls and the timing of these calls changes when the intended recipient is within close range.

== Inter-species interactions ==
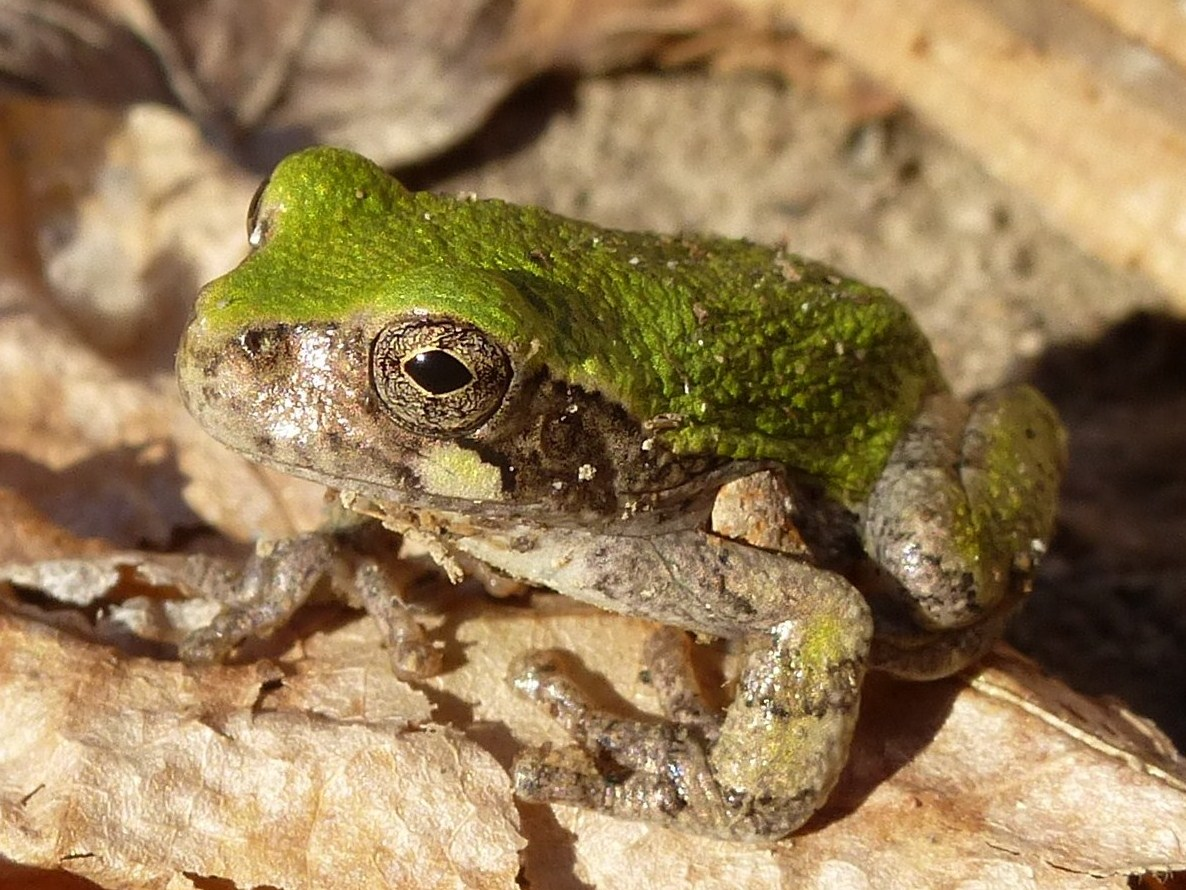
Gray treefrog, Missouri Ozarks

Dryophytes versicolor is known to be largely intersterile with D. chrysoscelis but there may be a limited amount of interfertility in sympatry. When D. versicolor is sympatric with D. chrysoscelis, females more strongly weight a species-specific cue (call rate) than a more general cue (call duration) when choosing mates. This appears to be an example of reproductive character displacement to keep the species separate. In addition, to enforce speciation there may be unknown mechanisms of reinforcement deployed between these species and further research may be fruitful.

Dryophytes versicolor and Dryophytes chrysoscelis call next to each other ponds resulting in interference of their vocalizations because their calls are so similar acoustically. In response to male advertisement calls, D. versicolor male answers with the same level of aggressiveness to males of the same species and to D. chrysoscelis males producing the initial call. D. versicolor male interactions with D. chrysoscelis males increase in aggressive intensity more quickly than with male interactions with their own species. Once the aggression levels intensified between these species, the weaker frog was more likely to retreat from the winner. In general, D. versicolor males initiate physical attacks during intense vocal conflict between the two species more often than D. chrysoscelis.

In previous studies, D. versicolor mate attractiveness decreases when there is call overlap with D. chrysoscelis. The D. versicolor mate attractiveness decreases even more so than D. chrysoscelis when there is call overlap, which can explain why the D. versicolor male tends to initiate aggressive physical contact more often: the D. versicolor has more to lose from the call overlap continuing to take place. While the advertisement calls of D. versicolor and D. chrysoscelis are distinguishable, the aggressive calls between these two species are similar.
