= List of amphibians and reptiles of Oregon =

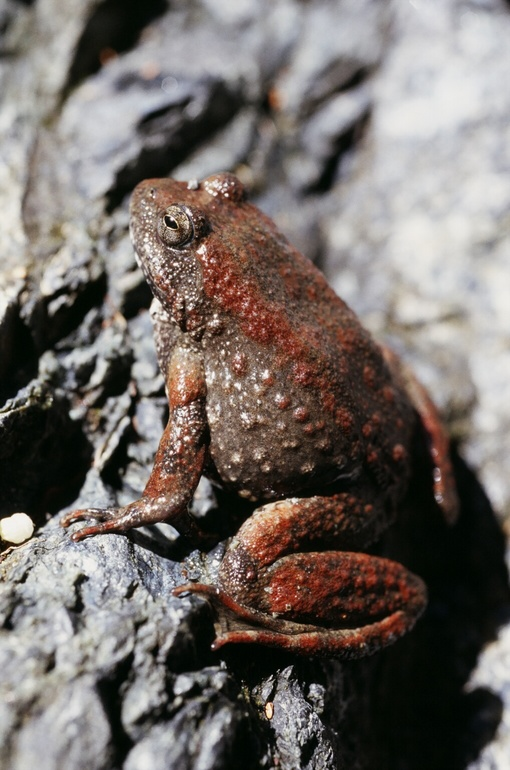
Foothill yellow-legged frog

Oregon is home to 31 amphibian species and 29 species of reptiles.

== Amphibians ==
Oregon's amphibians
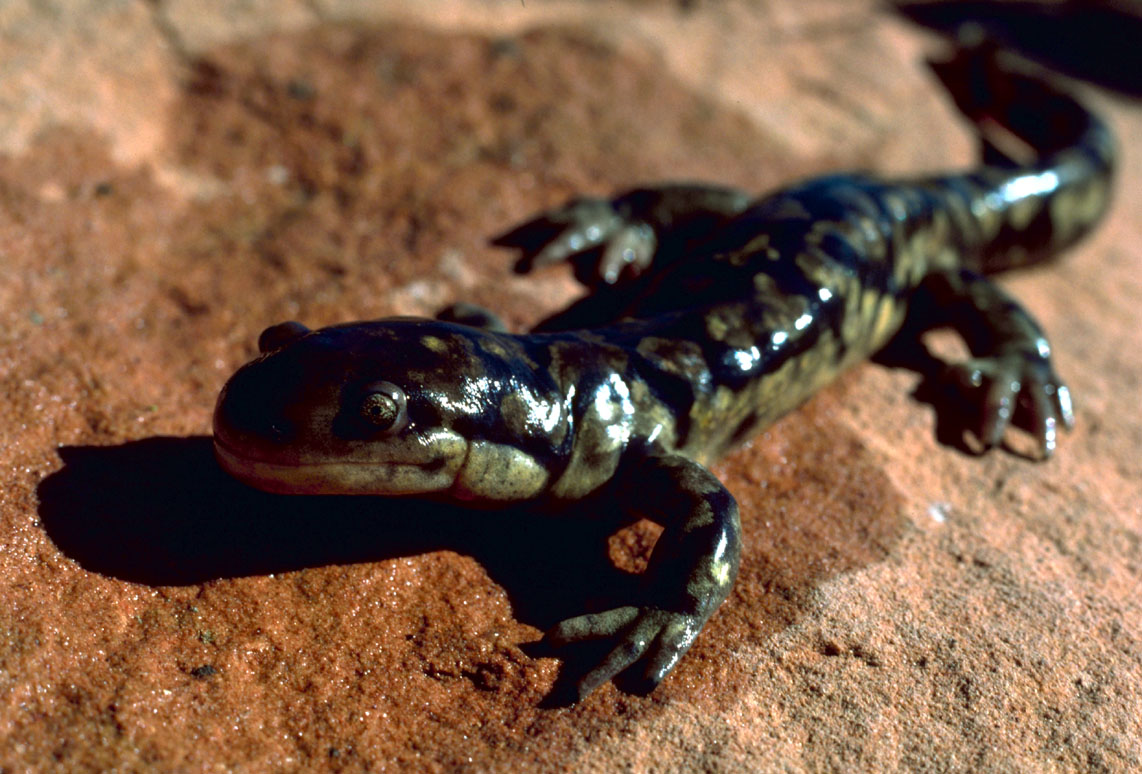
Tiger salamander

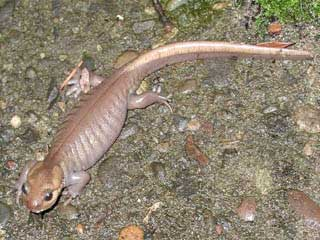
Northwestern salamander

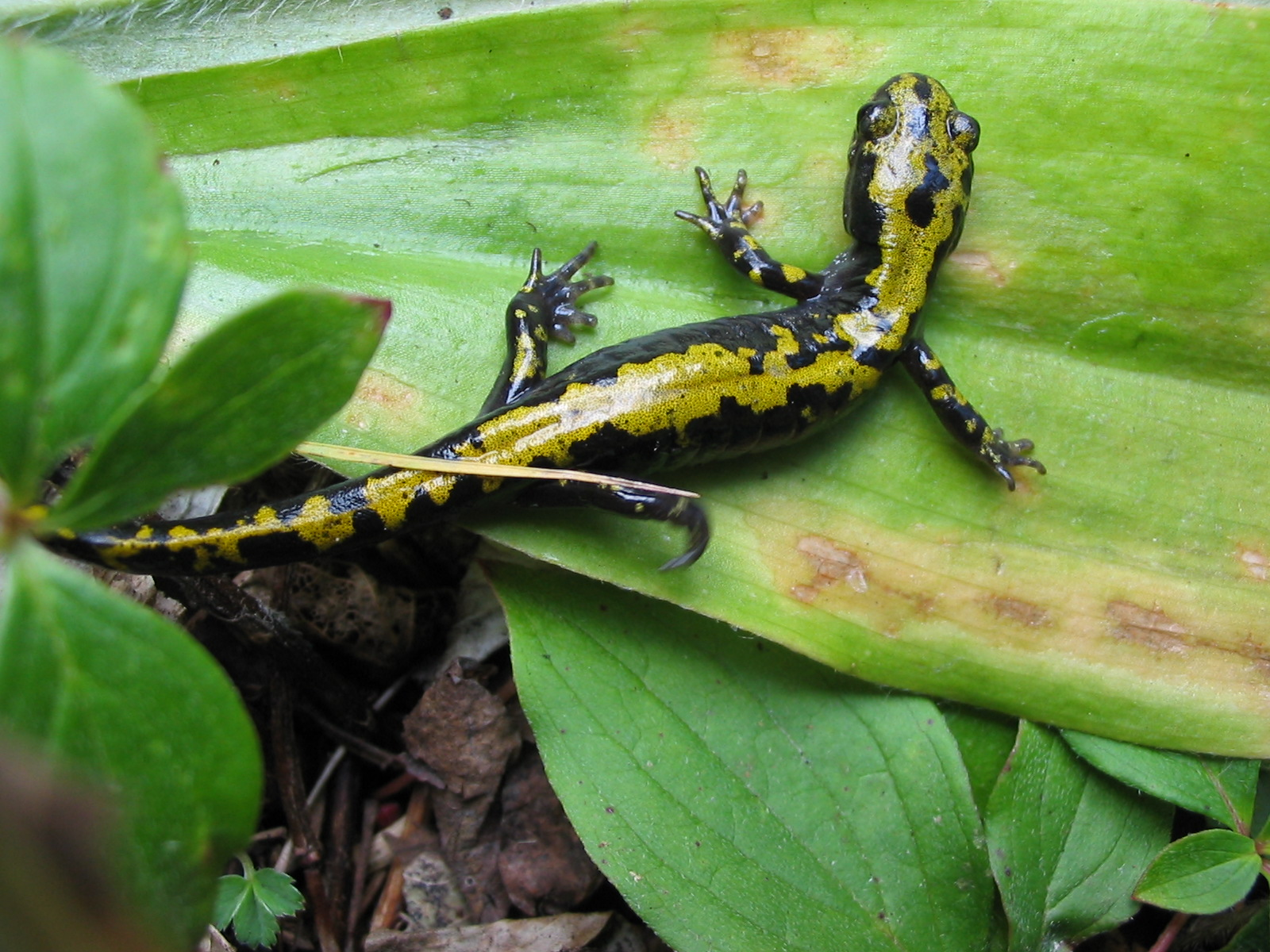
Long-toed salamander

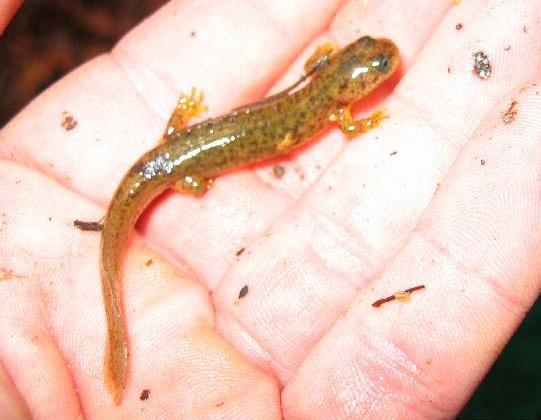
Southern torrent salamander

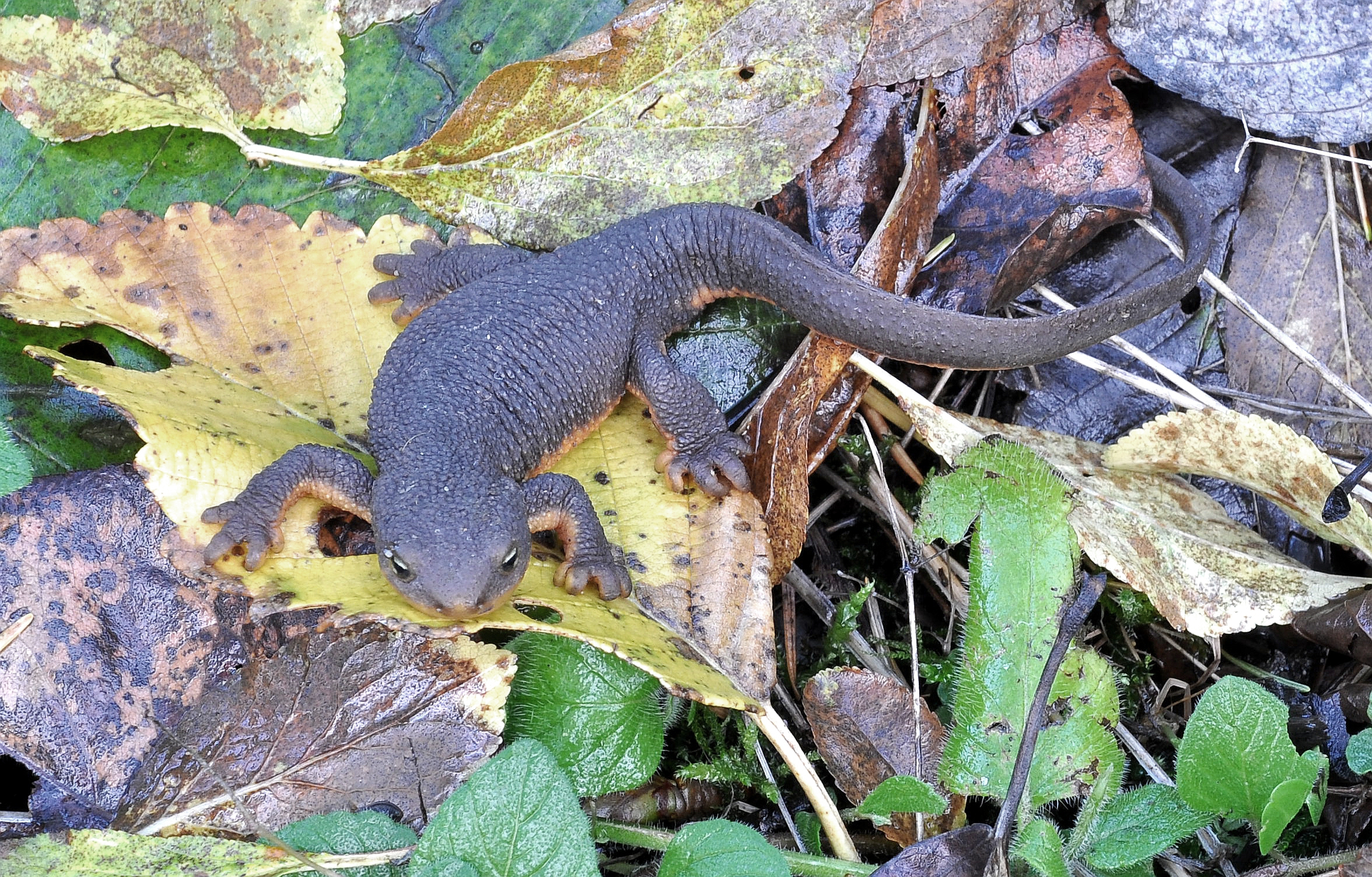
Rough-skinned newt

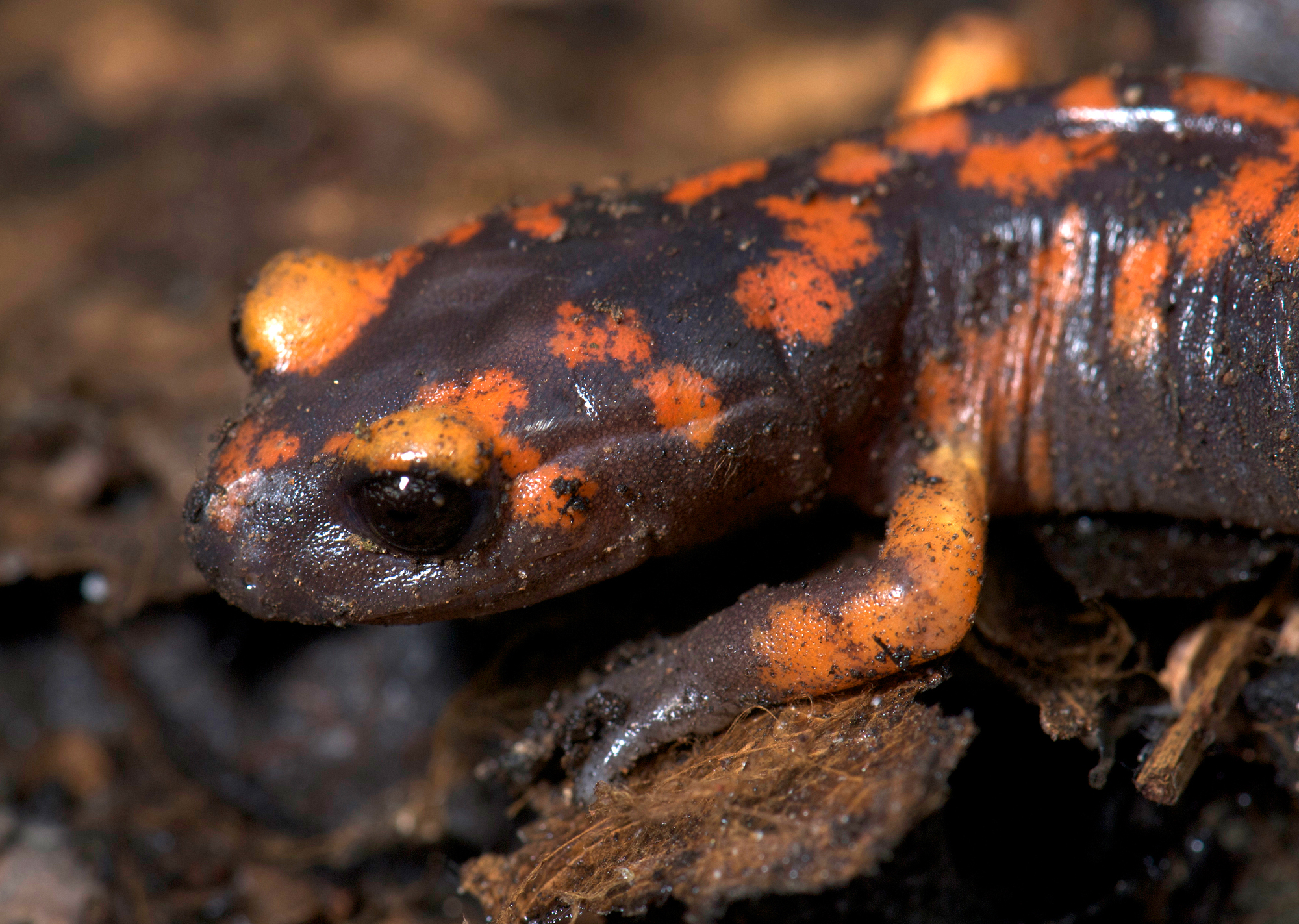
Ensatina

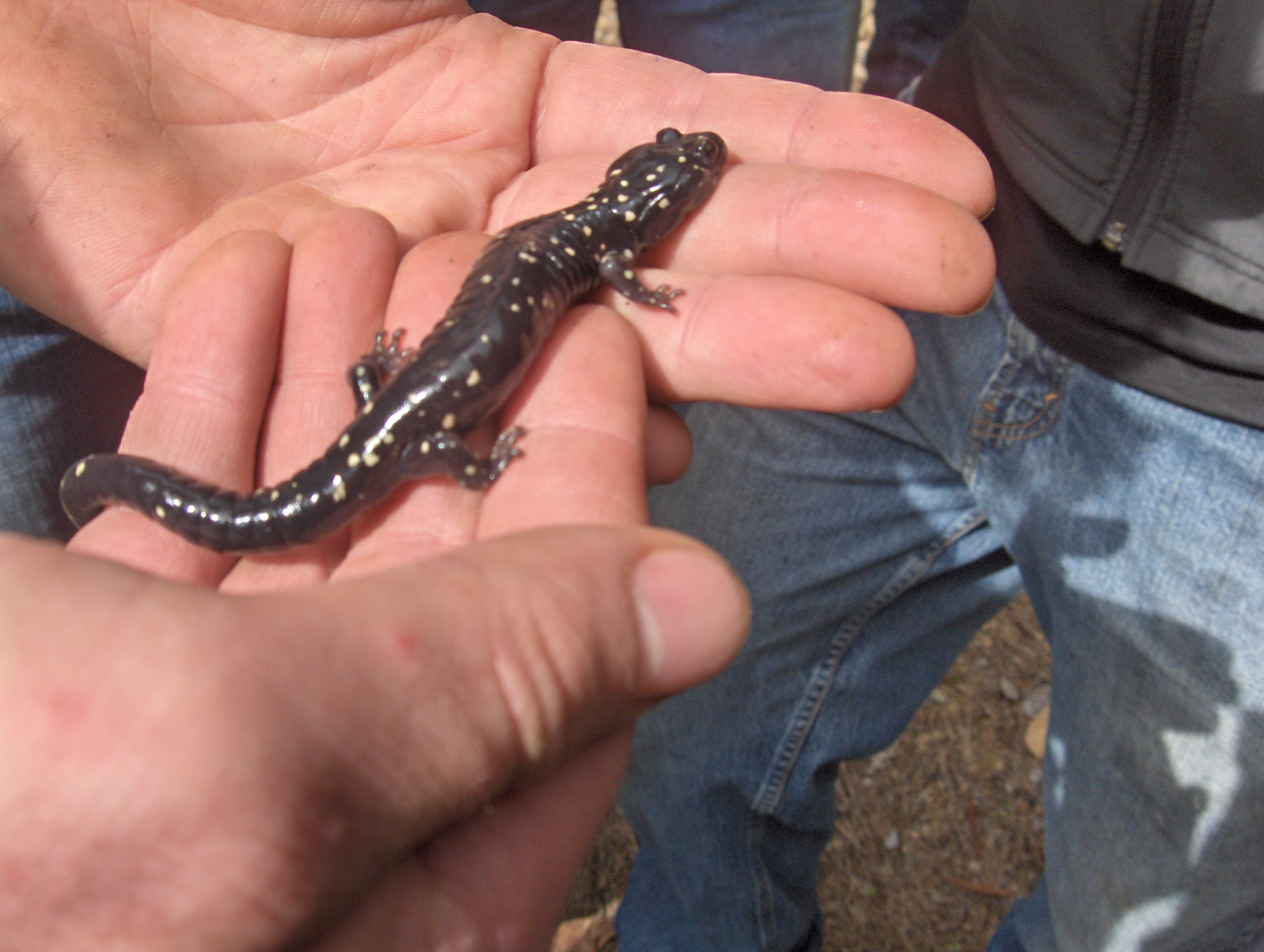
Black salamander

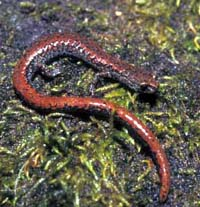
Oregon slender salamander

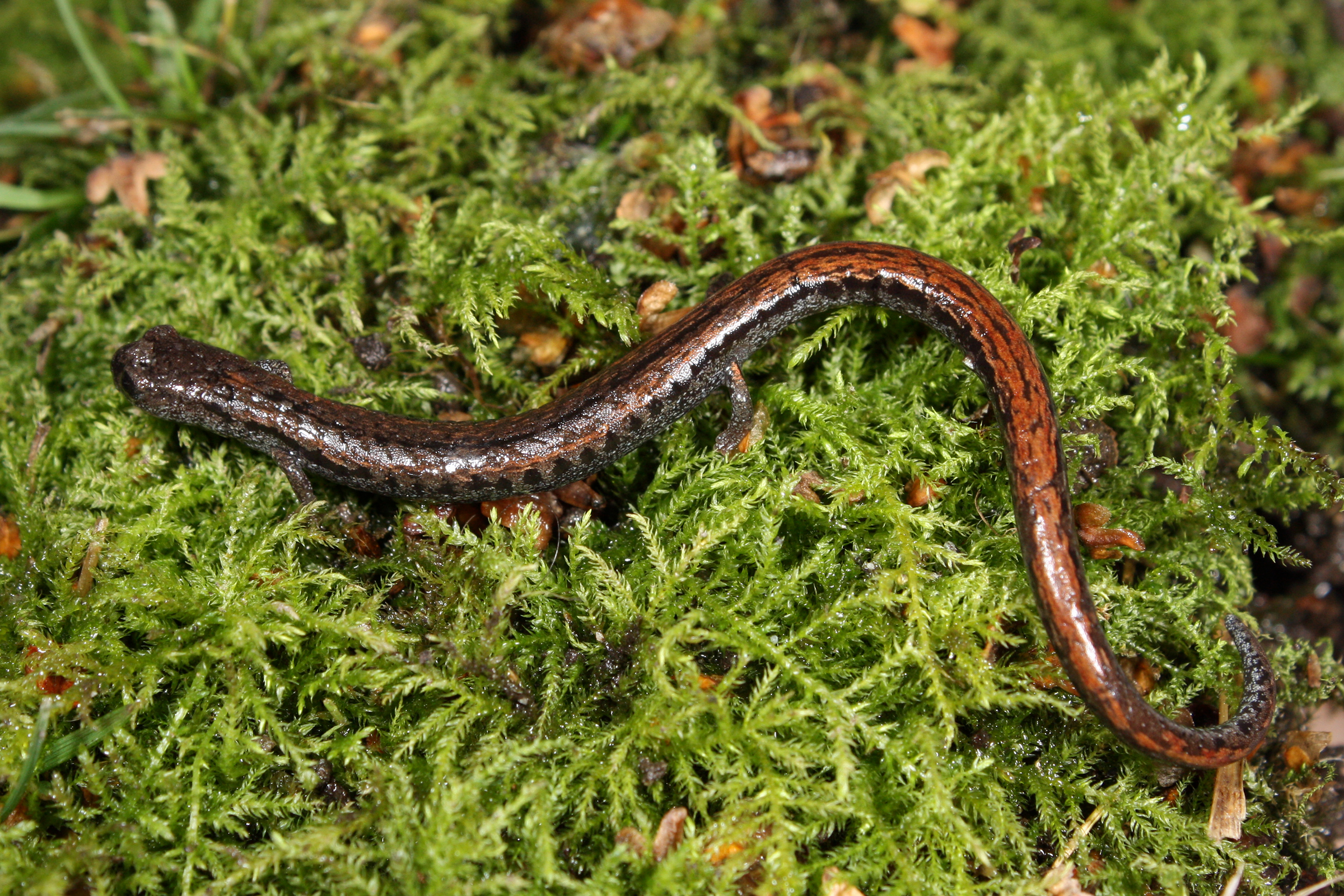
California slender salamander

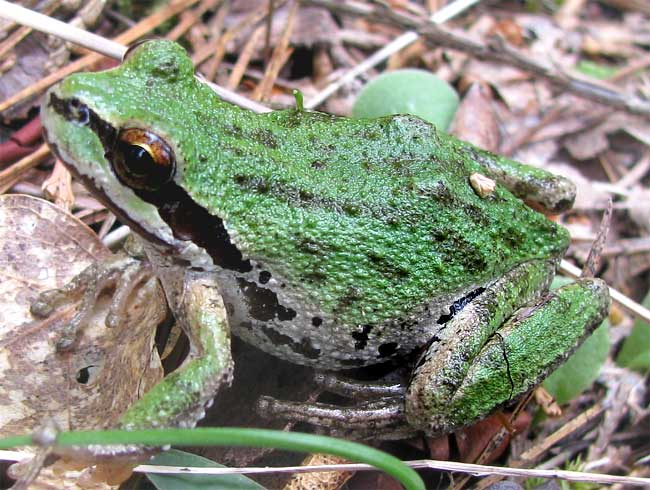
Pacific tree frog

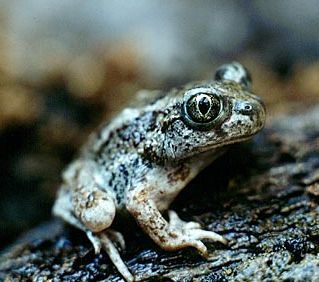
Great Basin spadefoot toad

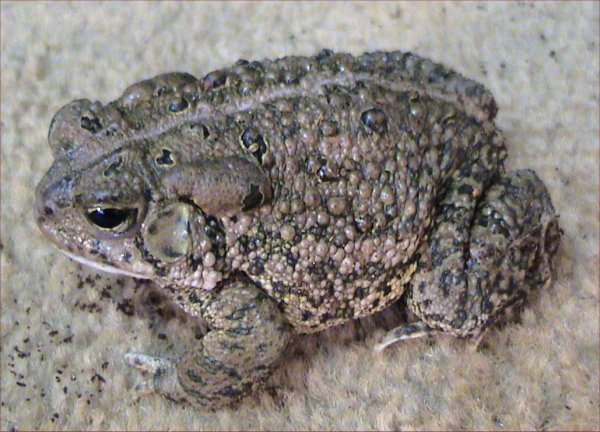
Woodhouse's toad

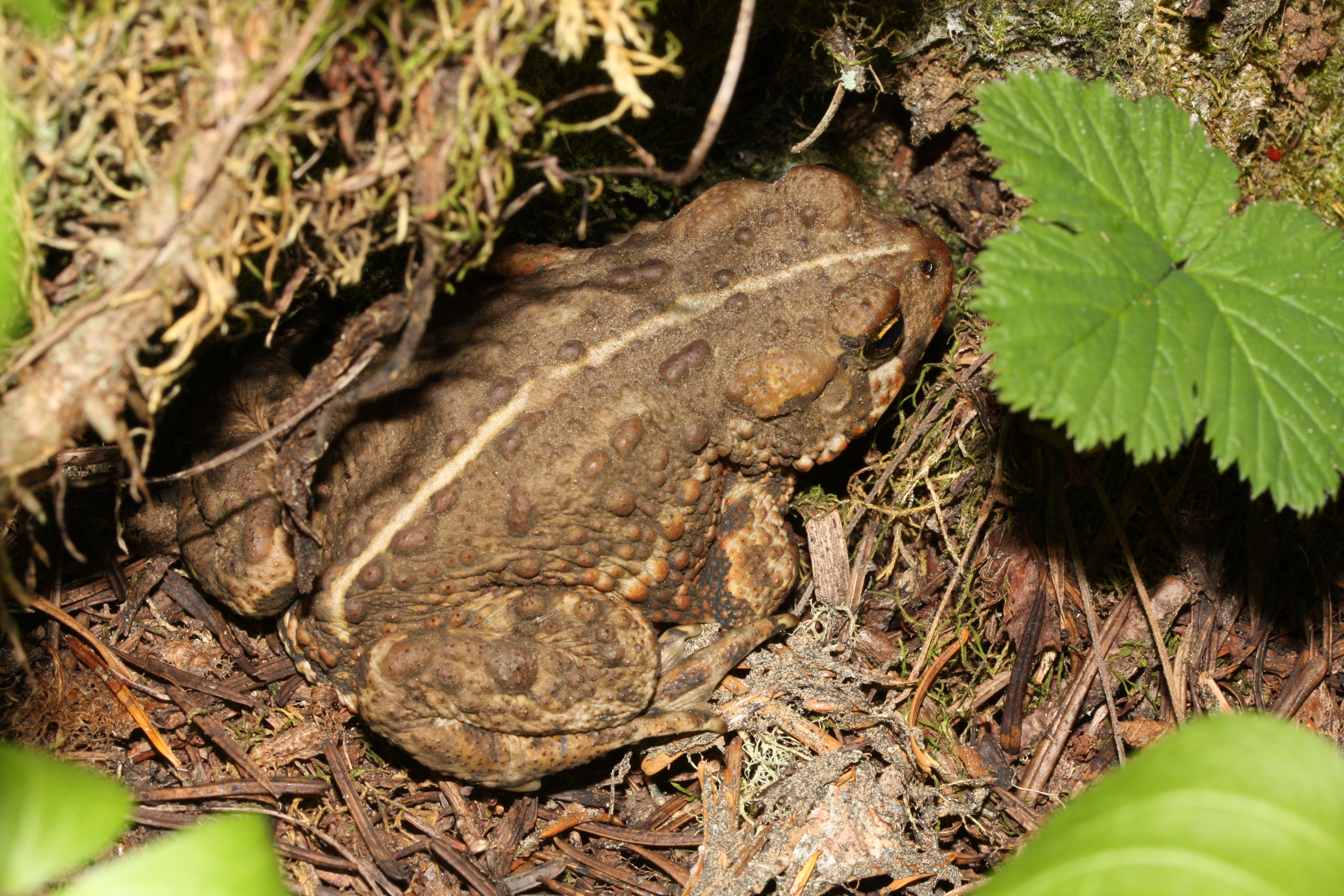
Western toad

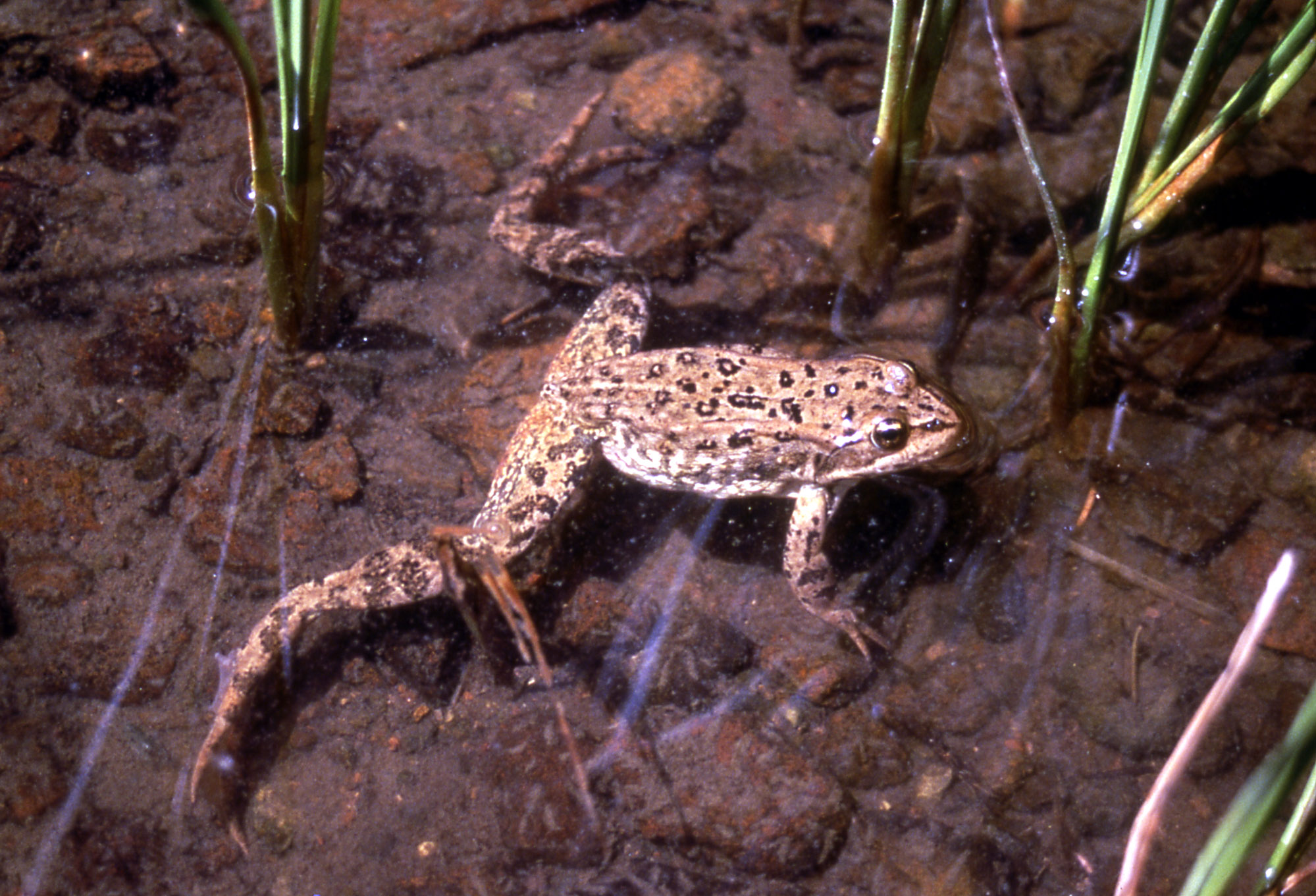
Columbia spotted frog

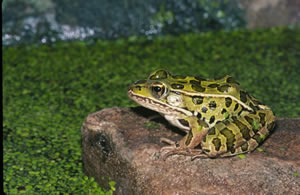
Northern leopard frog

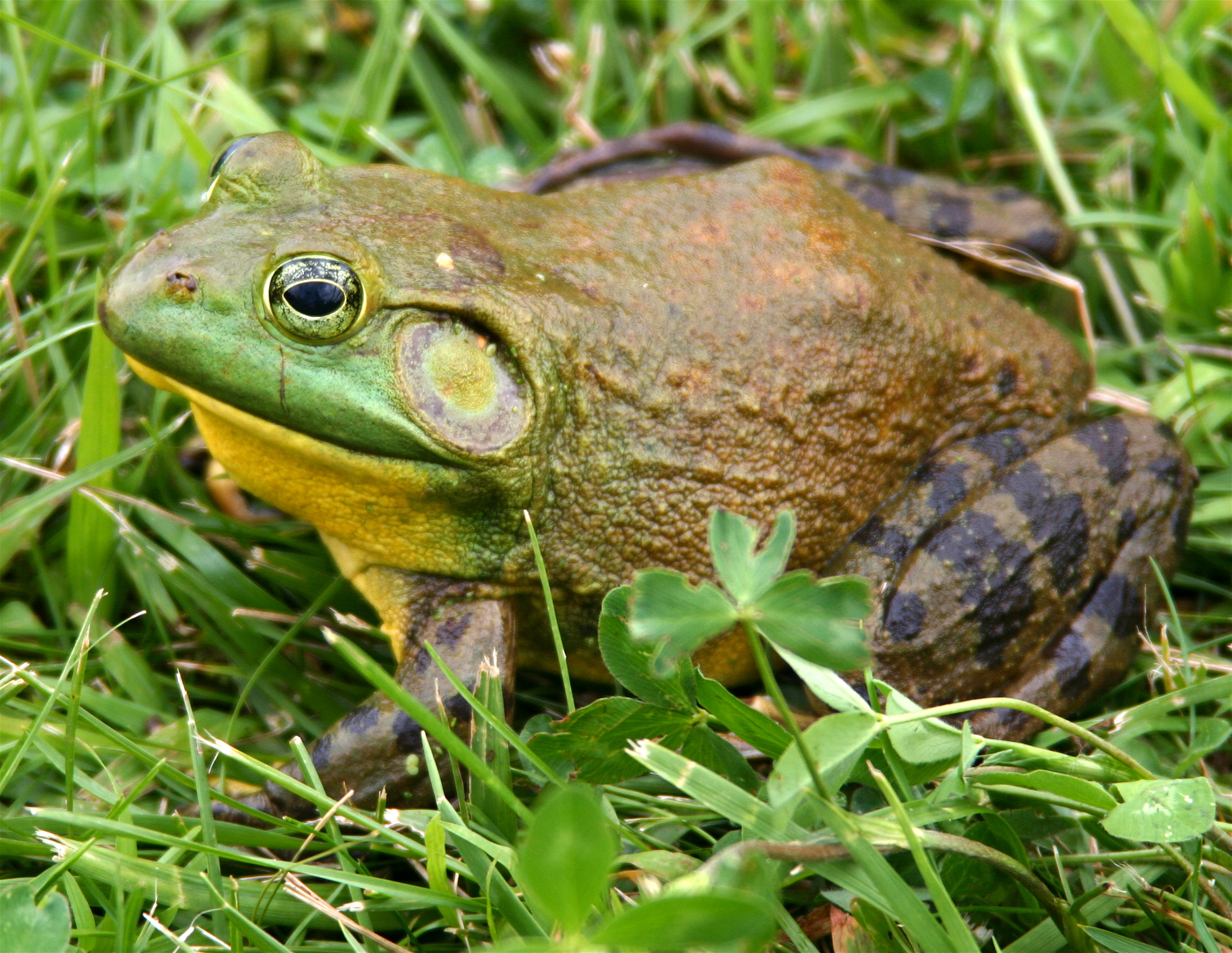
American bullfrog

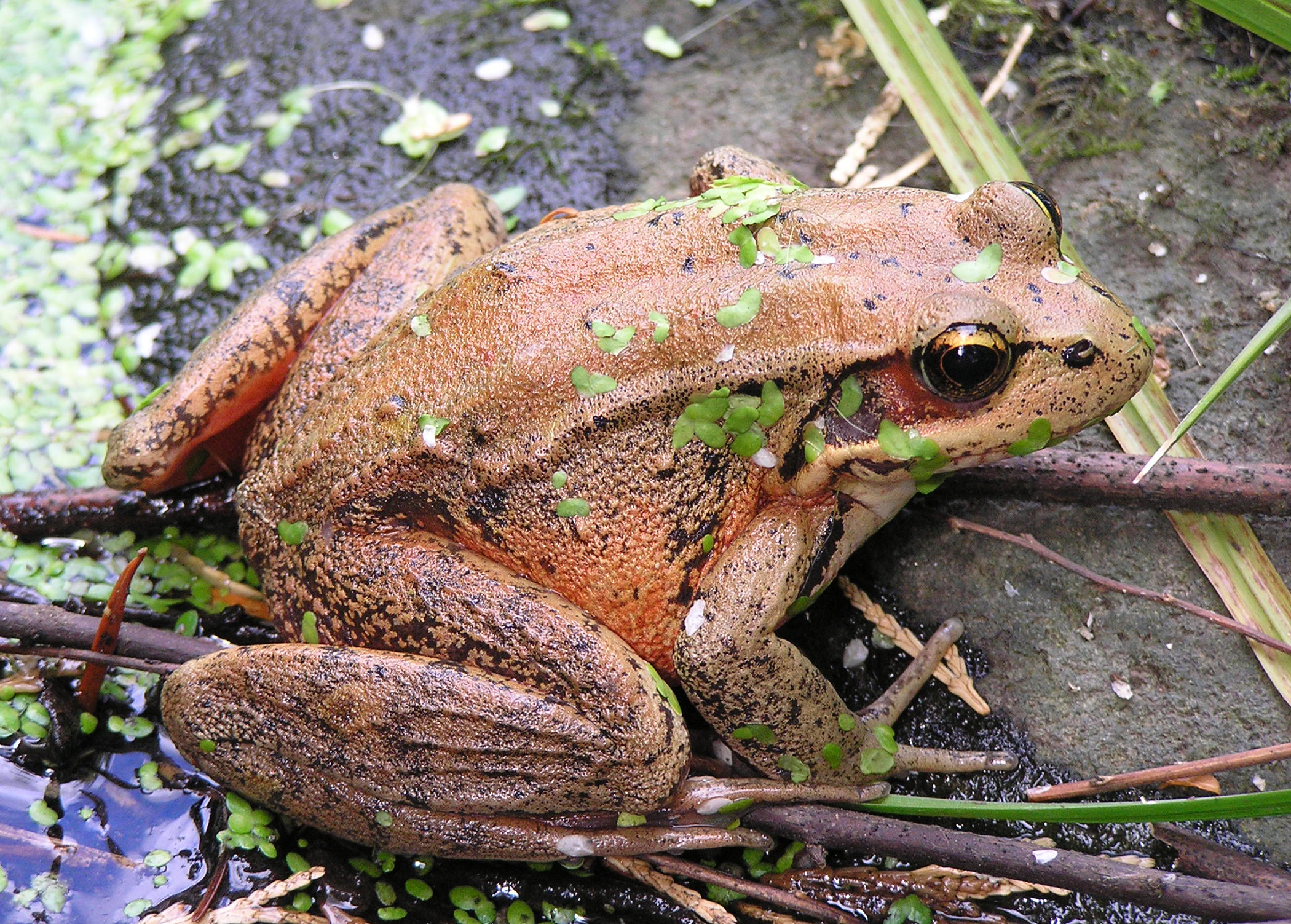
Red-legged frog

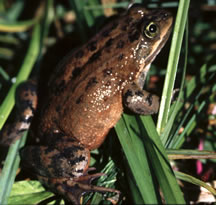
Oregon spotted frog

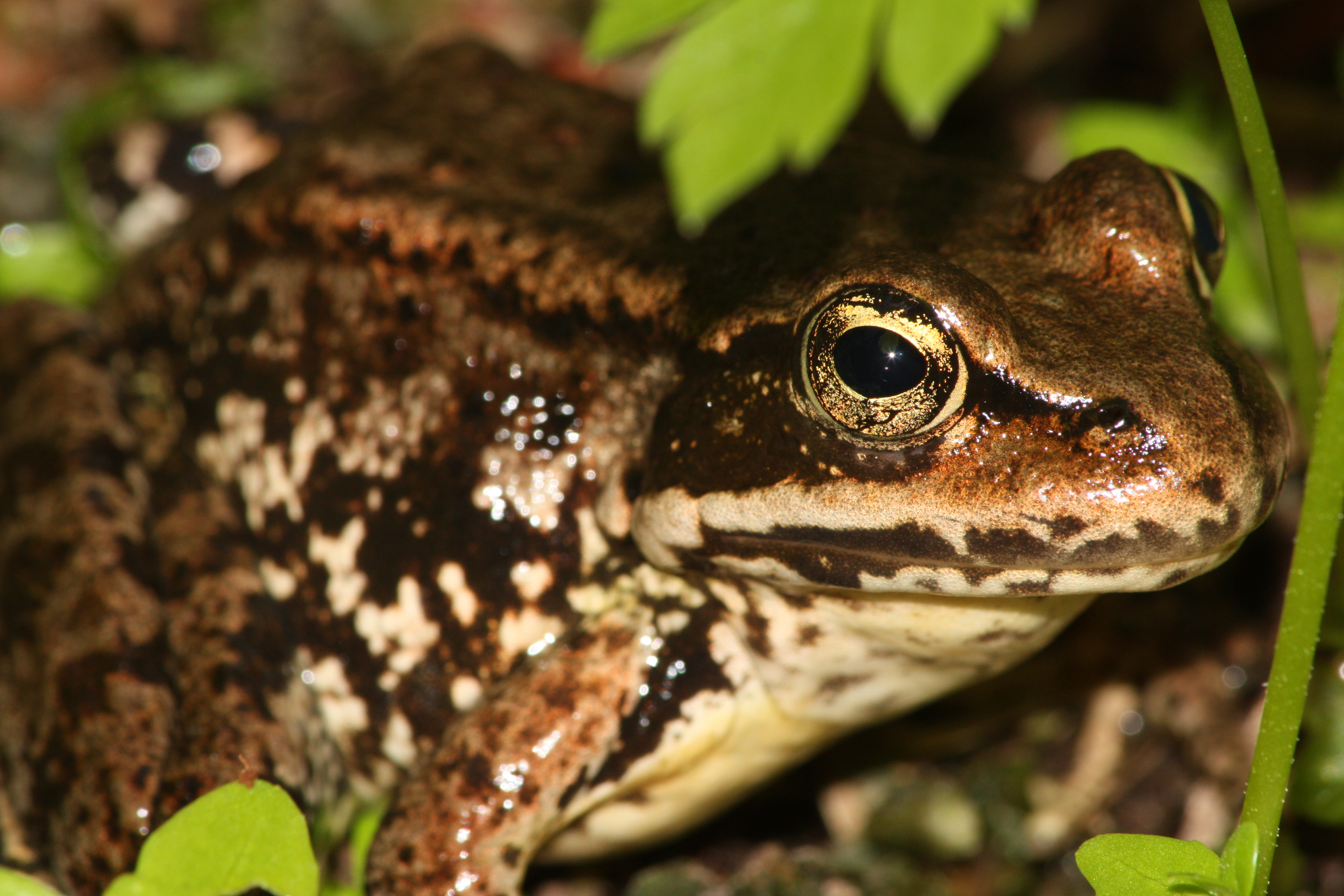
Cascades frog

=== Tiger salamander ===
The tiger salamander (Ambystoma tigrinum) is a species of mole salamander. Tiger salamanders are large, with a typical length of 6–8 inches. They can reach up to 14 inches in length, particularly neotenic individuals. Adults are usually blotchy with grey, green, or black, and have large, lidded eyes. They have short snouts, thick necks, sturdy legs, and long tails. Their diet consists largely of small insects and worms, though it is not rare for an adult to consume small frogs and baby mice.

=== Northwestern salamander ===
The northwestern salamander (Ambystoma gracile) inhabits the northwest Pacific coast of North America. These fairly large salamanders grow to 8.7 inches (220 mm) in length. It is found from southeastern Alaska on May Island, through Washington and Oregon south to the mouth of the Gulala River, Sonoma County, California. It occurs from sea level to timberline, but not east of the Cascade Divide. Its range includes Vancouver Island in British Columbia and Cypress, Whidbey, Bainbridge, and Vashon Islands in Washington (Snyder 1963).

=== Long-toed salamander ===
The long-toed salamander (Ambystoma macrodactylum, Baird 1849) is a mole salamander in the family Ambystomatidae. This species, typically 4.1–8.9 cm (1 3/5–3 1/2 in) long when mature, is characterized by its mottled black, brown and yellow pigmentation, and its long outer fourth toe on the hind limbs. Analysis of fossil records, genetics, and biogeography suggest that A. macrodactylum and A. laterale are descended from a common ancestor that gained access to the western Cordillera with the loss of the mid-continental seaway toward the Paleocene. The distribution of the long-toed salamander is primarily in the Pacific Northwest, with an altitudinal range of up to 2,800 meters (9,200 ft). It lives in a variety of habitats including temperate rainforests, coniferous forests, montane riparian zones, sagebrush plains, red fir forests, semi-arid sagebrush, cheatgrass plains, and alpine meadows along the rocky shores of mountain lakes. It lives in slow-moving streams, ponds and lakes during its aquatic breeding phase. The long-toed salamander hibernates during the cold winter months, surviving on protein energy reserves stored in the skin and tail.

=== Cope's giant salamander ===
The Cope's giant salamander (Dicamptodon copei) is a species of salamander in the family Dicamptodontidae. It reaches between 12.4–19.1 cm (4 7/8 – 7 1/2 in). The salamander resembles Pacific giant salamander larvae, but it never transforms to a terrestrial stage. It is smaller overall with a narrower head and shorter limbs. It is brown above with patches of yellowish-tan covering clusters of white skin glands, its belly is dark bluish-gray. The salamander has 12–13 inconspicuous costal grooves. There are three closely related species to this taxon: D. ensatus (California giant salamander), D. aterrimus (Idaho giant salamander) and D. tenebrosus (coastal giant salamander). D. copei is endemic to the Pacific Northwestern portion of the United States. It is found on the Olympic Peninsula, Washington. Its natural habitat is temperate forests, rivers, freshwater lakes, and freshwater marshes.

=== Coastal giant salamander ===
The coastal giant salamander (Dicamptodon tenebrosus) is a species of salamander in the family Dicamptodontidae (Pacific giant salamanders). It is endemic to the United States and Canada. There are three closely related species to this taxon: D. ensatus (California giant salamander), D. copei (Cope's giant salamander), and D. aterrimus (Idaho giant salamander). Its natural habitats are temperate forests, rivers, freshwater lakes, and freshwater marshes. The coastal giant salamander is endemic to the Pacific Northwest, found in Northern California, Oregon, Washington, and southern British Columbia.

=== Columbia torrent salamander ===
The Columbia torrent salamander (Rhyacotriton kezeri) is a species of salamander in the family Rhyacotritonidae. It is endemic to the United States. Its natural habitats are temperate forests, rivers, and freshwater springs. It is a small salamander (up to 10 cm total length) that lives in clear, cold mountain streams.

=== Southern torrent salamander ===
The southern torrent salamander (Rhyacotriton variegatus) is a member of the salamander family Rhyacotritonidae. It is a small salamander endemic to the Pacific Northwest from Northern California to Southern Oregon; its distribution reaches the farthest south of the torrent salamanders. They are one of four species of Rhyacotriton, along with R. cascadae, R. kezeri and R. olympicus. All species of Rhyacotriton are small with their body length being less than 5 inches. The family Rhyacotritonidae is found only in the Pacific Northwest, extending from Northern California to the Washington Peninsula.

=== Cascade torrent salamander ===
The Cascade torrent salamander (Rhyacotriton cascadae) is a species of salamander in the family Rhyacotritonidae. It is endemic to the United States. Its natural habitats are temperate forests, rivers, and freshwater springs.

=== Rough-skinned newt ===
The rough-skinned newt (Taricha granulosa) is a newt known for its strong poison. Habitats of rough-skinned newts are found throughout the West Coast of the United States and British Columbia. Their range extends south to Santa Cruz, California and north to Alaska.

=== Dunn's salamander ===
The Dunn's salamander (Plethodon dunni) is a species of salamander in the family Plethodontidae. It is endemic to the United States. Its natural habitats are temperate forests, freshwater springs, and rocky areas. It has no larval stage. Its diet consists mainly of small invertebrates.

=== Larch Mountain salamander ===
The Larch Mountain salamander (Plethodon larselli) is a species of salamander in the family Plethodontidae. It is endemic to the United States. The Larch Mountain salamander occurs in the Cascade Mountains of southern Washington and northern Oregon. In Washington, it occurs from the Columbia River Gorge to just north of Snoqualmie Pass. Its natural habitats are temperate forests and rocky areas.

=== Western red-backed salamander ===
The Western redback salamander (Plethodon vehiculum) is a species of salamander in the family Plethodontidae. Its natural habitats are temperate forests and rocky areas. Colored stripe on the back range from red to yellow.

=== Del Norte salamander ===
The Del Norte salamander (Plethodon elongatus) is a species of salamander in the family Plethodontidae. It is endemic to the United States. Adults are 2 3/8 - 3 inches long (6 - 7.6 cm) from snout to vent, and 4 1/3 - 6 inches (11 – 15 cm) in total length. Its natural habitats are temperate forests and rocky areas.

=== Siskiyou Mountains salamander ===
The Siskiyou Mountains salamander (Plethodon stormi), also called the Siskiyou Mountain salamander, exists only in isolated locations along the Klamath River in northern California and southern Oregon. It is a close relative of the Del Norte salamander, and some herpetologists believe it may be a subspecies of the latter.

=== Ensatina ===
Ensatina eschscholtzii (commonly known by its genus name, Ensatina) is a complex of plethodontid (lungless) salamanders. found in coniferous forests, oak woodland and chaparral from British Columbia, through Washington, Oregon, across California (where all seven subspecies variations are located), all the way down to Baja California in Mexico.

=== Clouded salamander ===
The clouded salamander (Aneides ferreus) is a species of salamander in the family Plethodontidae. It is endemic to the United States. Its natural habitat is temperate forests and it is probable that many nest in trees.

=== Black salamander ===
The black salamander (Aneides flavipunctatus) is a species of salamander in the family Plethodontidae. It is endemic to the United States. Its natural habitats are temperate forests and temperate grassland.

=== Oregon slender salamander ===
The Oregon slender salamander (Batrachoseps wrightorum) is a species of salamander in the family Plethodontidae. The Oregon slender salamander is endemic to the Northwestern United States. Its natural habitat is temperate forests of moist Douglas fir, maple, and red cedar woodlands in Oregon, to 3,000 feet (910 m).

=== California slender salamander ===
The California slender salamander (Batrachoseps attenuatus) is a lungless salamander that is found primarily in coastal mountain areas of Northern California, United States as well as in a limited part of the western foothills of the Sierra Nevada, California, in patches of the northern Central Valley of California, and in extreme southwestern Oregon.

=== Coastal tailed frog ===
The coastal tailed frog (Ascaphus truei) is a species of frog in the genus Ascaphus, the only genus in the family Ascaphidae /æˈskæfɪdiː/. The "tail" in the name is actually an extension of the male cloaca. The tail is one of two distinctive anatomical features adapting the species to life in fast-flowing streams. It is the only North American frog that reproduces by internal fertilization. Until 2001, the genus was believed to be monotypic, the single species being the tailed frog (Ascaphus truei Stejneger, 1899). However, in that year Nielson, Lohman, and Sullivan published evidence in Evolution that promoted the Rocky Mountain tailed frog (Ascaphus montanus) from a subspecies to its own species. Since then, the former species has been formally called coastal tailed frog.

=== Pacific tree frog ===
The Pacific tree frog (Pseudacris regilla) is a very common species of chorus frog, with a range from the West Coast of the United States (from North California, Oregon, and Washington) to British Columbia in Canada. Living anywhere from sea level up to over 10,000 feet, they are found in shades of greens or browns and even have been known to change between them. They live in many types of habitats and reproduce in aquatic settings. This species is also known as the Pacific chorus frog.

=== Great Basin spadefoot toad ===
The Great Basin spadefoot (Spea intermontana) is a species of toad in the family Scaphiopodidae. The natural habitats of the Great Basin spadefoot include pinyon-juniper, ponderosa pine, and high elevation spruce-fir forests, semidesert shrubland, sagebrush flats, temperate grasslands, and deserts. They are present in agricultural areas as well. The Great Basin spadefoot can be found from southern British Columbia through the eastern portions of Washington and Oregon and in southern Idaho. Their range extends throughout all of Nevada and into most of Utah; they are also present in small areas in California, Arizona, Colorado, and Wyoming.

=== Western toad ===
The western toad or boreal toad (Anaxyrus boreas) is a large toad species, between 5.6 and 13 cm long, of western North America. It has a white or cream dorsal stripe, and is dusky gray or greenish dorsally with skin glands concentrated within the dark blotches.

=== Woodhouse's toad ===
The Woodhouse's toad (Anaxyrus woodhousii) is a medium-sized (4 inches or 10 centimetres) true toad, which is native to the United States and Mexico. There are two recognized subspecies. The epithet woodhousii is in honor of the American physician and naturalist Samuel Washington Woodhouse. B. woodhousii tends to hybridize with Bufo americanus in their overlapping ranges.

=== American bullfrog ===
The American bullfrog (Rana catesbeiana), often simply known as the bullfrog in Canada and the United States, is an aquatic frog, a member of the family Ranidae, or "true frogs", native to much of North America. This is a frog of larger, permanent water bodies, swamps, ponds, and lakes, where it is usually found along the water's edge. On rainy nights, bullfrogs, along with many other amphibians, travel overland, and may be seen in numbers on country roads.

=== Columbia spotted frog ===
The Columbia spotted frog (Rana luteiventris) is a North American species of frog. It is a medium-sized frog reaching lengths of up to 3 1/2 inches (90 cm). Its color ranges from a dark, olive green to light brown with irregularly-shaped black spots on its back and legs (rendering its name). The belly and upper lip are white in color. Individuals can be distinguished from other Rana species by their shorter back legs, narrow snout and upturned eyes. Since they spend most of their time in the water, they also have more webbing in their hind feet than similar species.

=== Northern leopard frog ===
The northern leopard frog (Rana pipiens)) is a species of leopard frog from the family Ranidae native to parts of Canada and United States. The northern leopard frog is a fairly large species of frog reaching about 11 centimeters (4.3 inches) in length. It varies from green to brown in dorsal colour with large dark circular spots on its back, sides and legs. Northern leopard frogs have a wide range of habitats. They are found in permanent ponds, swamps, marshes and slow moving streams throughout forest, open and urban areas. They normally inhabit water bodies with abundant aquatic vegetation. They are well adapted to cold and can be found above 3,000 meters (9,800 feet) asl.

=== Red-legged frog ===
The Northern red-legged frog (Rana aurora) is a species of amphibian, whose range is the coastal region stretching from southwest British Columbia to Northern California, and is protected in British Columbia, Oregon and California. As a member of the genus Rana, this species is considered a true frog, with characteristic smooth skin and a narrow waist. This frog requires still waters for breeding, and is rarely found at any great distance from its breeding ponds or marshes.

=== Spotted frog ===
The Oregon spotted frog (Rana pretiosa) (meaning "precious frog") is a member of the true frogs from the family Ranidae. Oregon spotted frogs are found in British Columbia, Washington state and Oregon. They were previously found but have been extirpated in California. In Oregon, the Oregon spotted frog's current range is Deschutes, Lane and Klamath counties.

=== Cascades frog ===
The Cascades frog (Rana cascadae) is a species of frog in the family Ranidae. It is found in western United States and possibly Canada, mainly in the Cascade Range and Olympic Mountains. The Cascade frog was first discovered in the Cascade Mountains in the California regions. It can be found throughout the Cascade Mountains ranging from Washington through Oregon, and California. They concentrate heavily around the volcanic area of the peaks. Its natural habitats are temperate forests, temperate grassland, rivers, swamps, freshwater lakes, intermittent freshwater lakes, freshwater marshes generally between 665 m (2,180 ft) and 2,450 m (8,040 ft) elevation. The range may extend lower in Washington.

=== Foothill yellow-legged frog ===
The foothill yellow-legged frog (Rana boylii) is a small-sized (3.72-8.2 cm) frog from the Rana genus in the family Ranidae. This species can be found from northern Oregon, down California's west coast, and into Baja California, Mexico. Both the Columbia spotted frog and the Cascades frog overlap in the northern part of this species's range.

== Reptiles ==
Oregon's reptiles
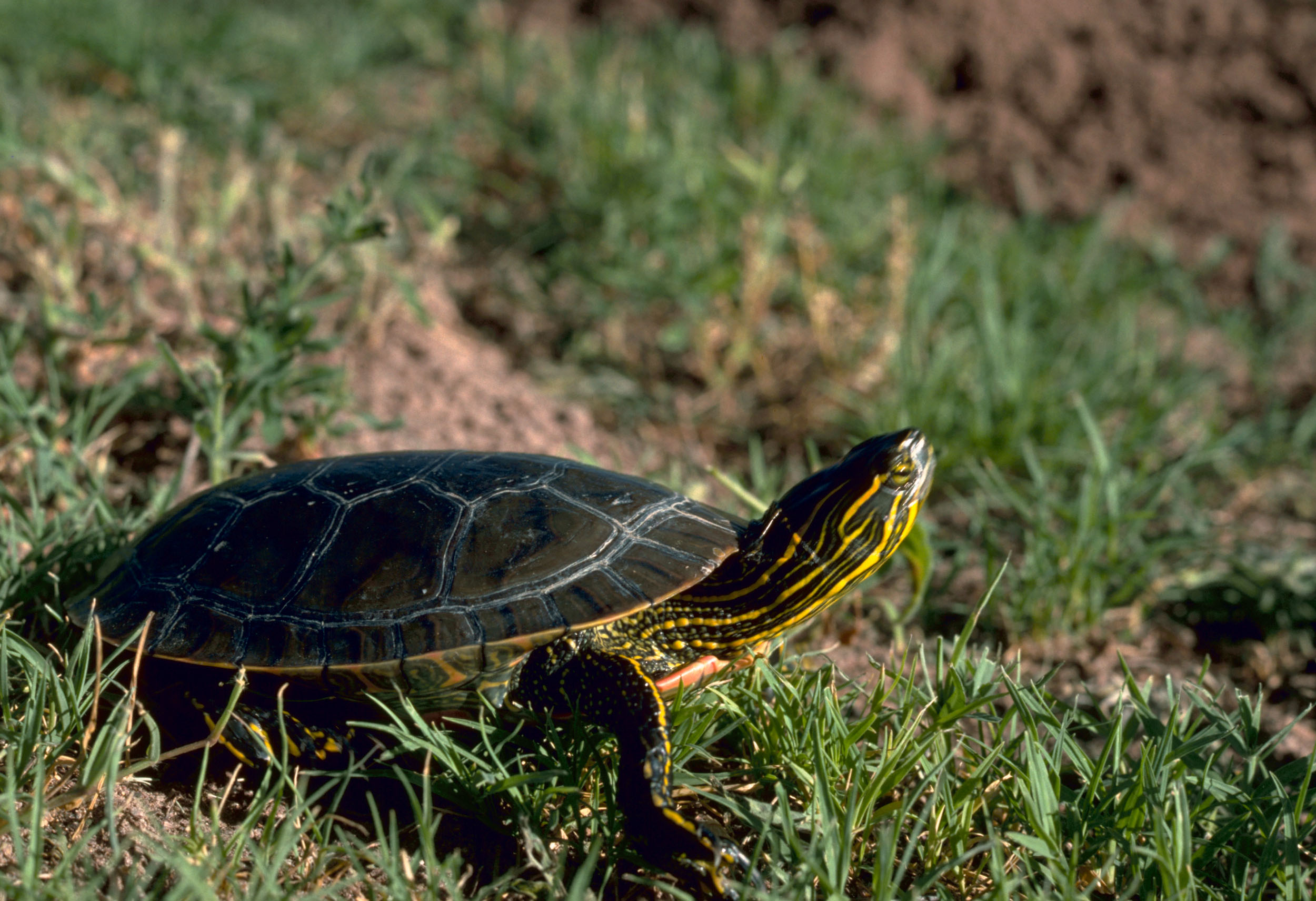
Painted turtle

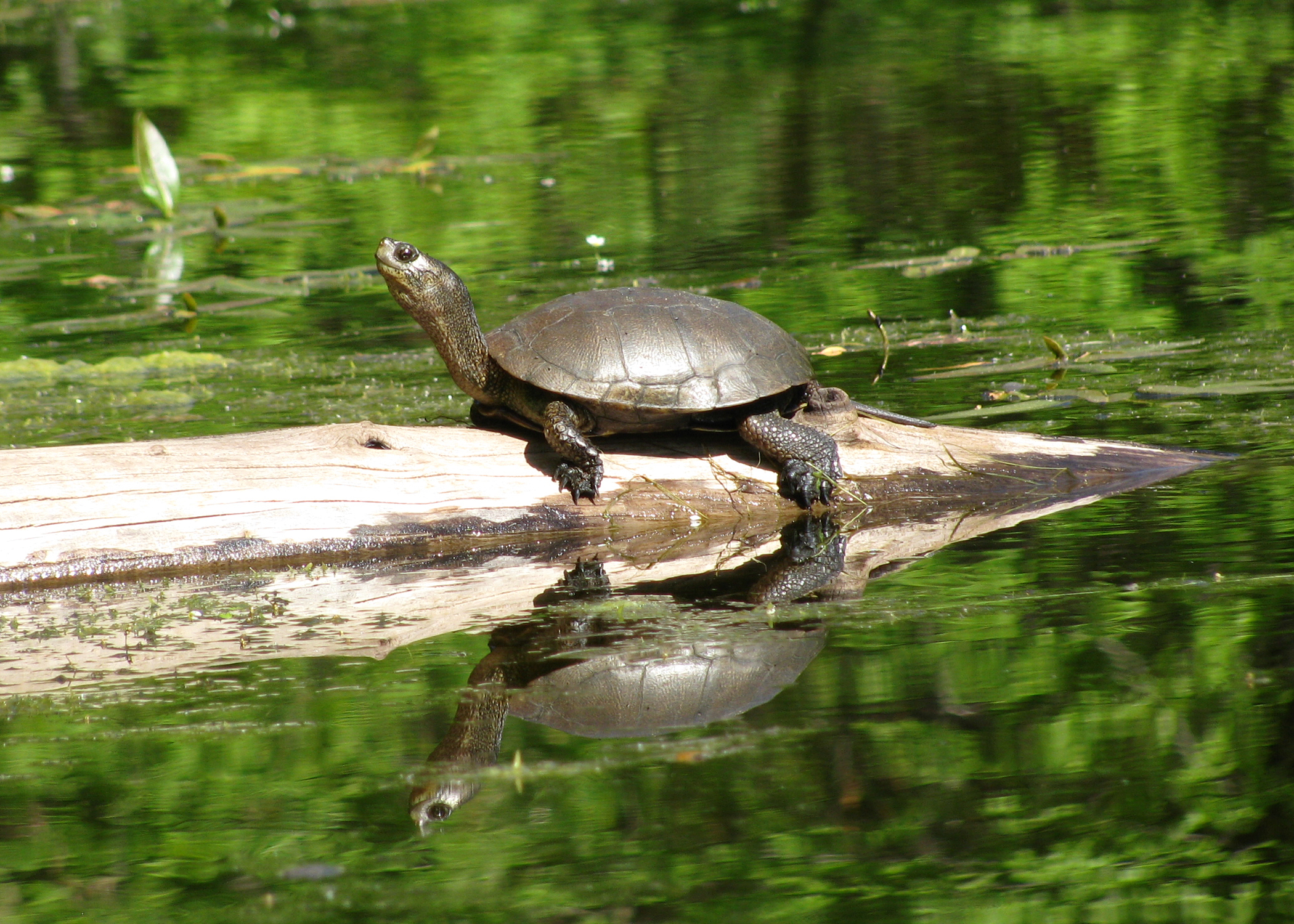
Western pond turtle

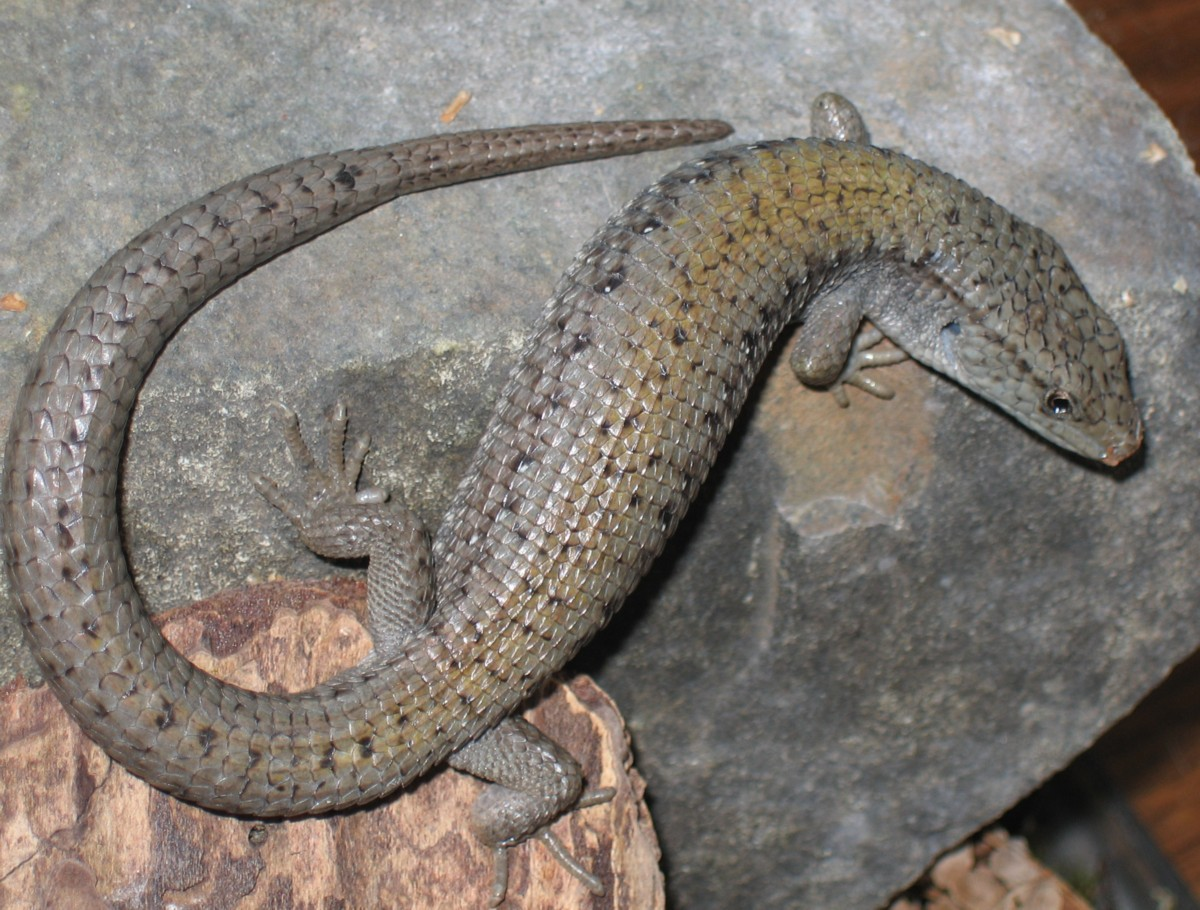
Northern alligator lizard

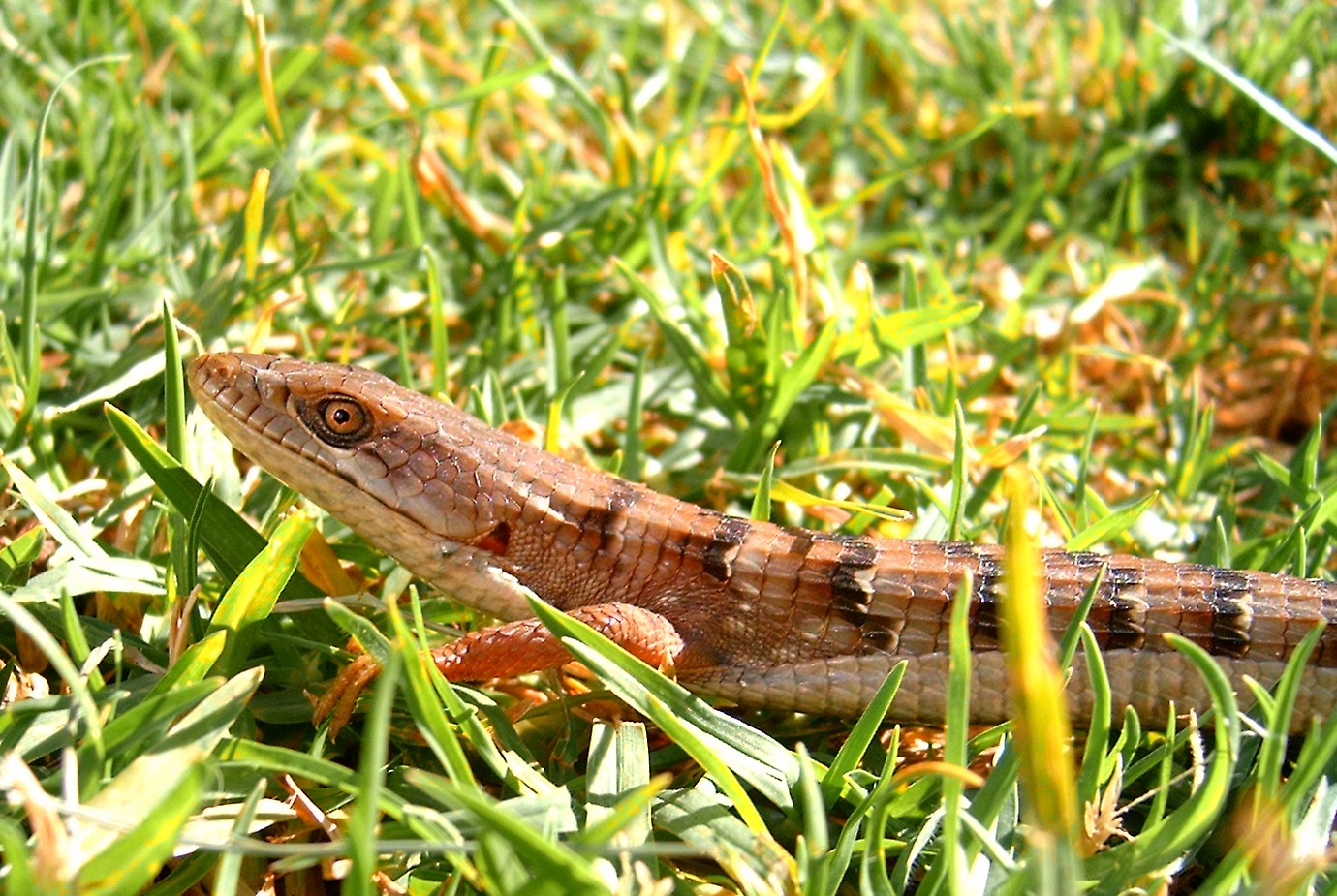
Southern alligator lizard

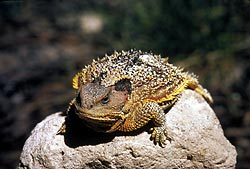
Short-horned lizard

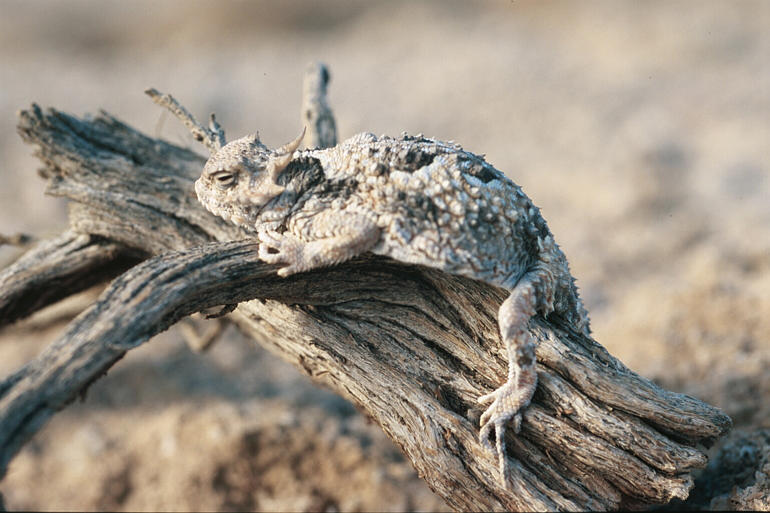
Desert horned lizard

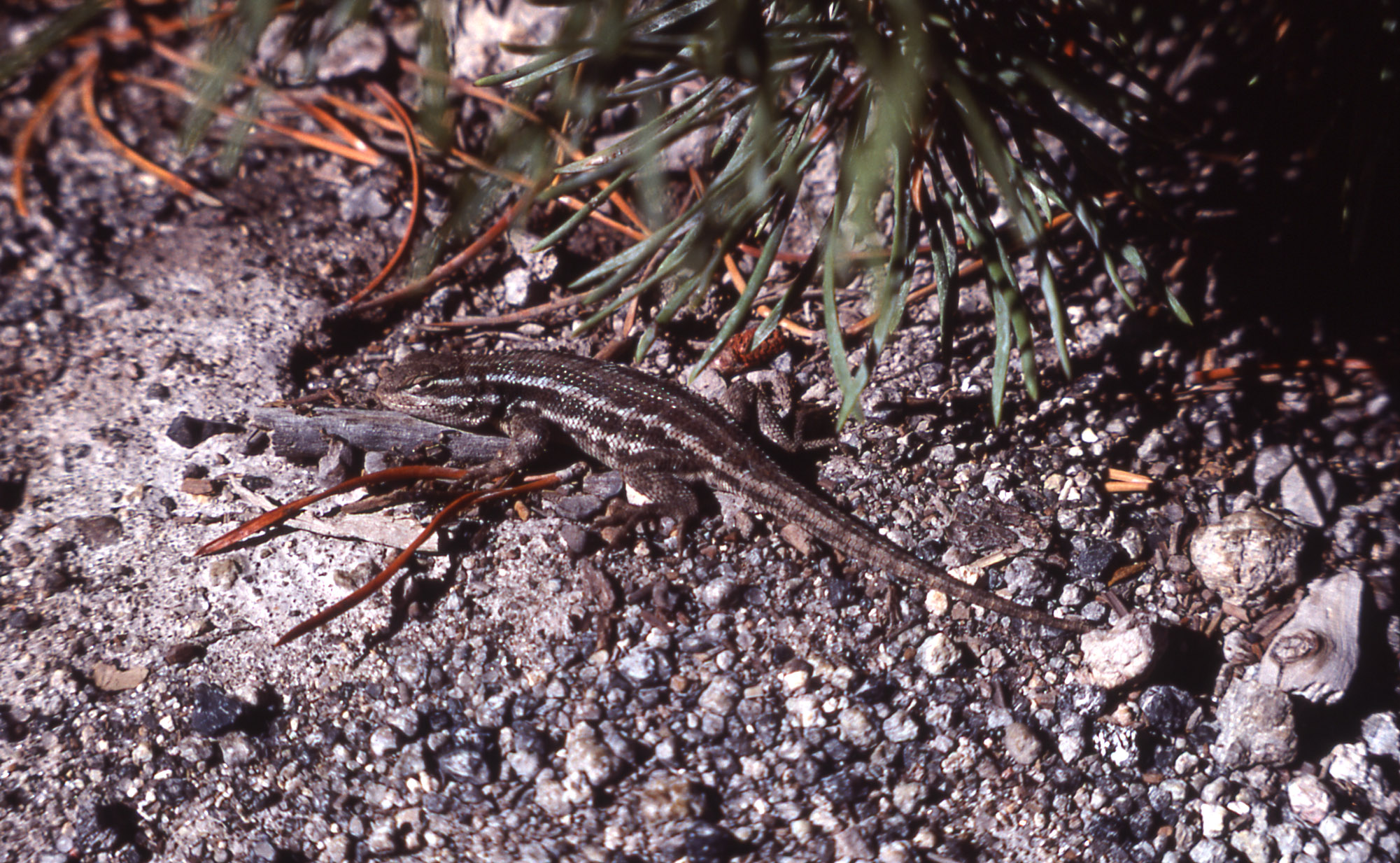
Sagebrush lizard

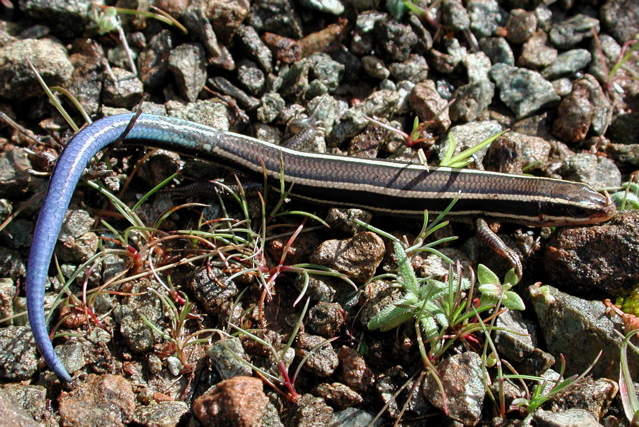
Western skink

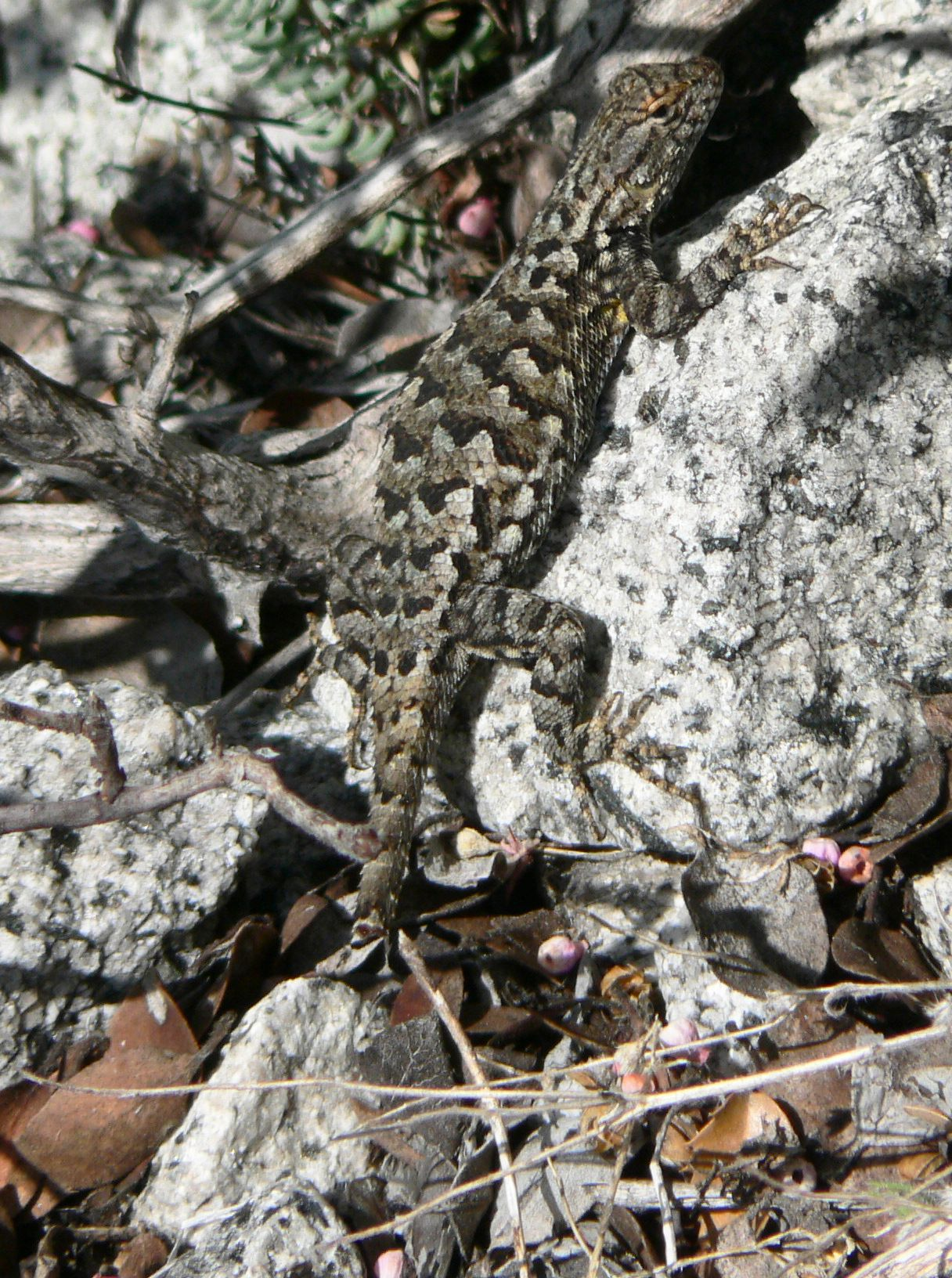
Western fence lizard

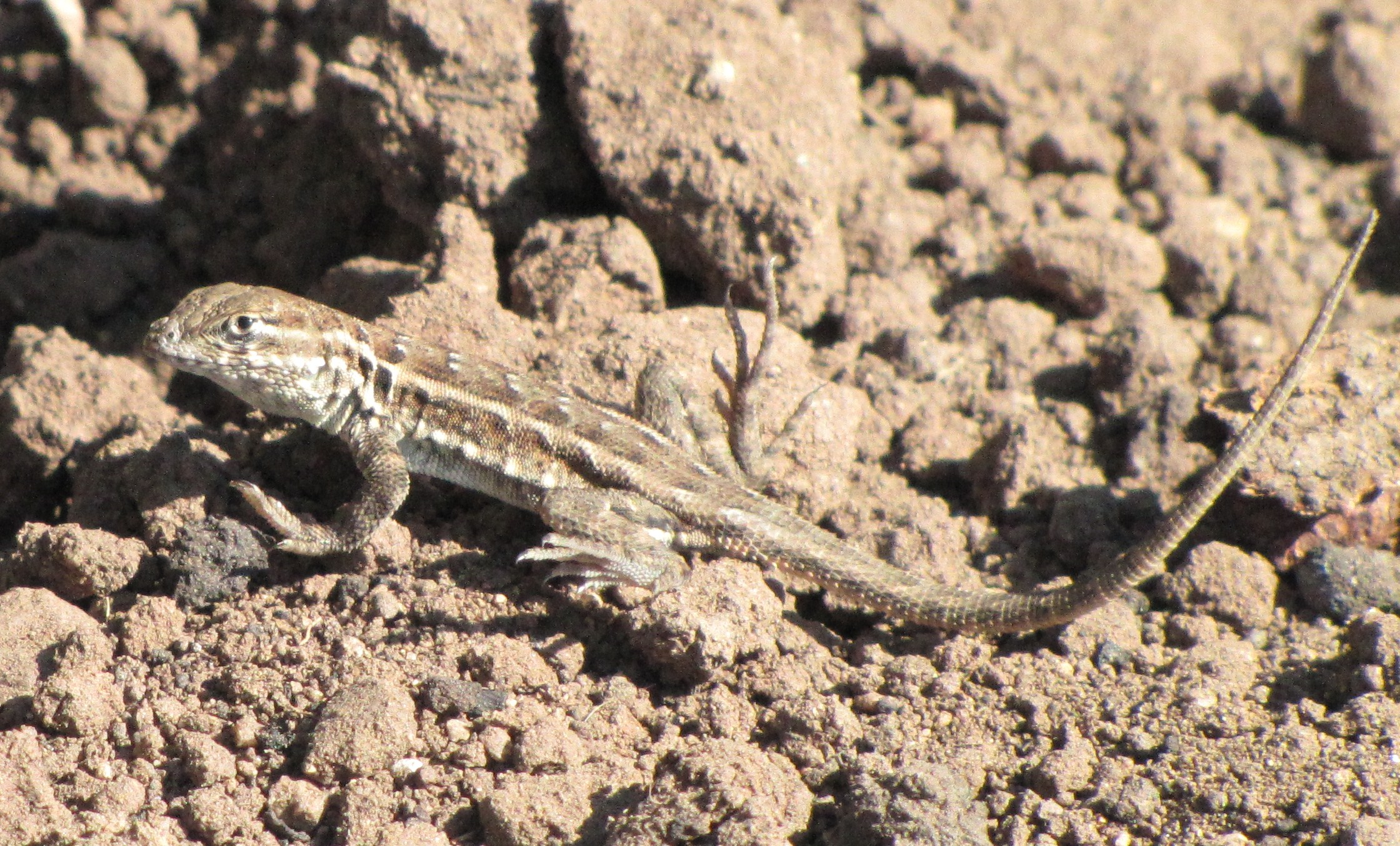
Side-blotched lizard

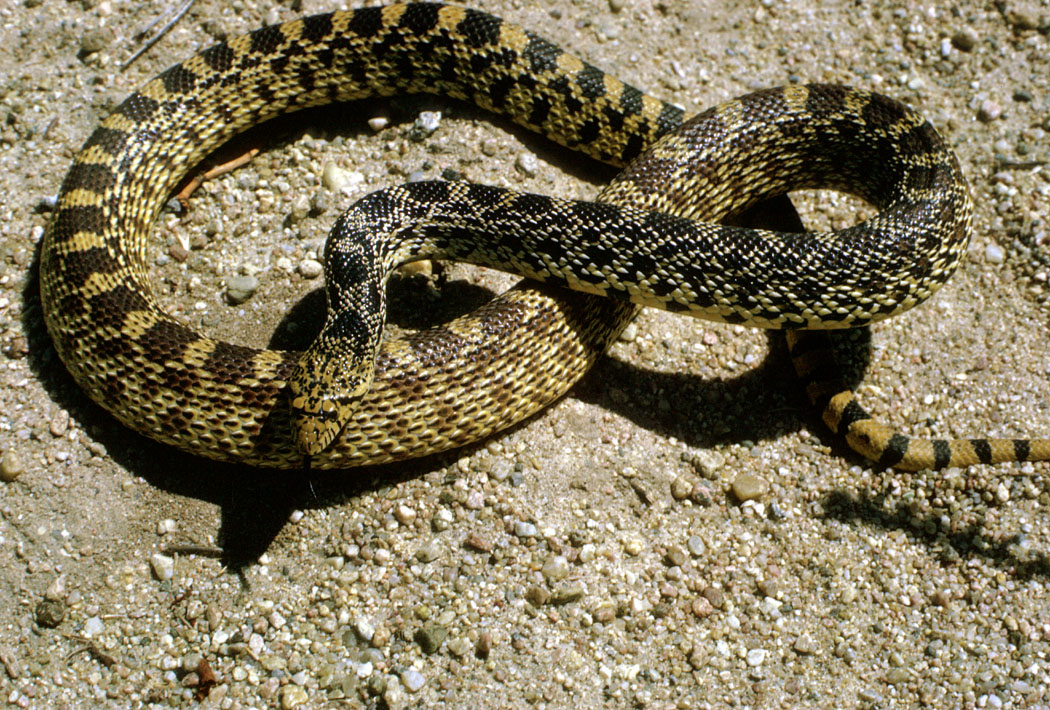
Gopher snake

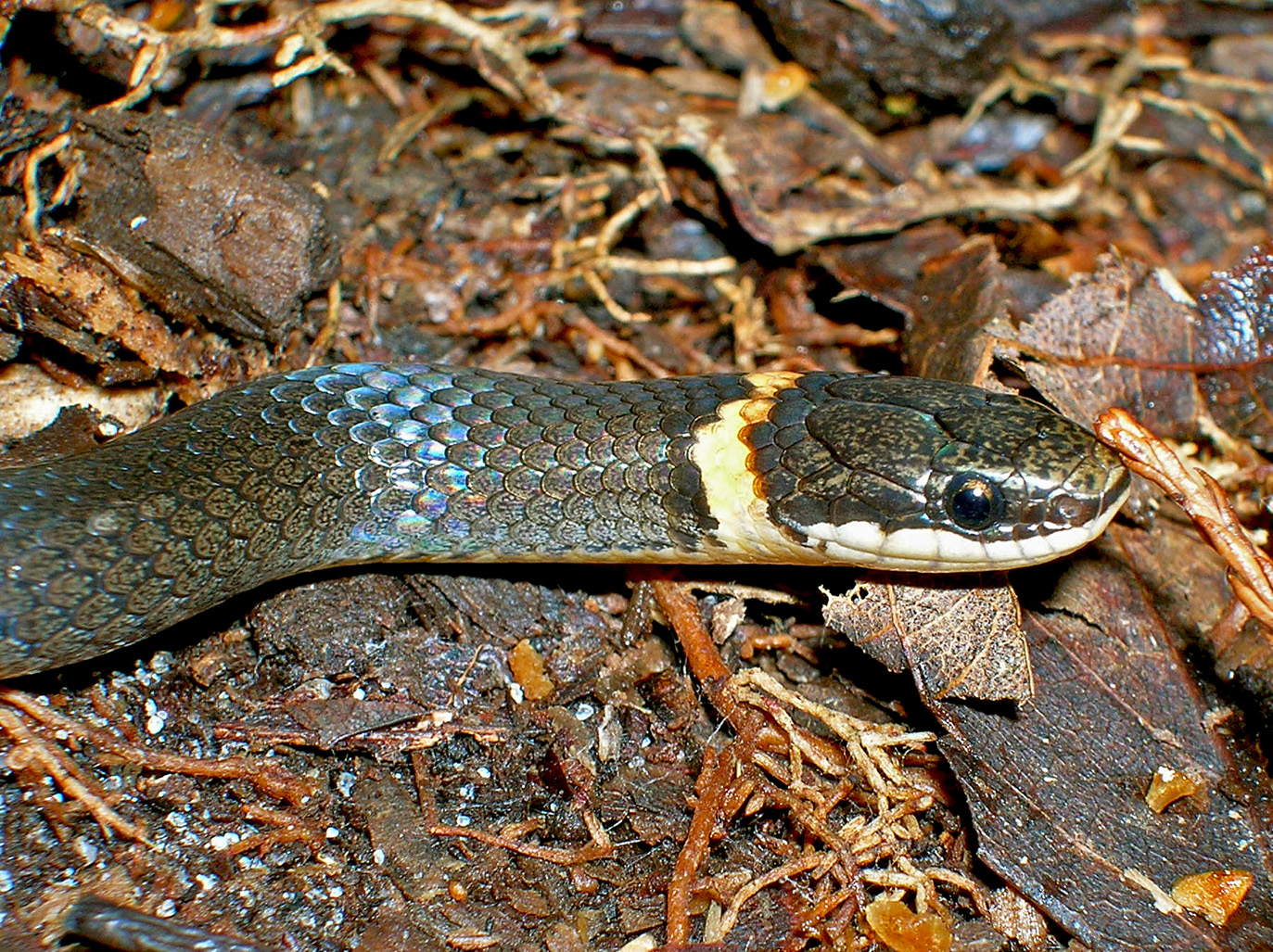
Ring-neck snake

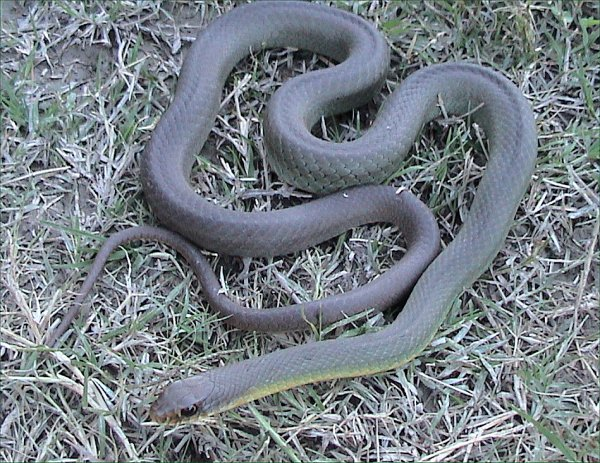
Eastern racer

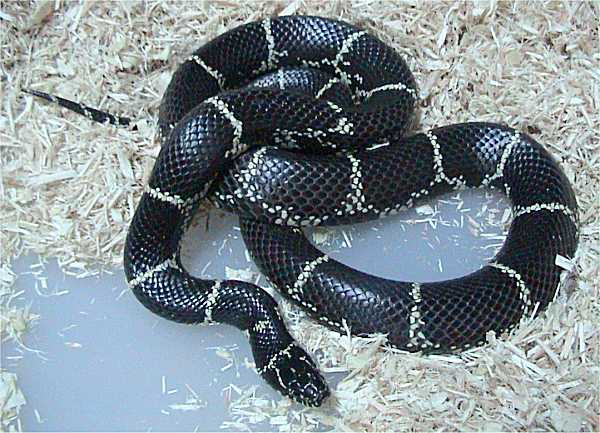
Common kingsnake

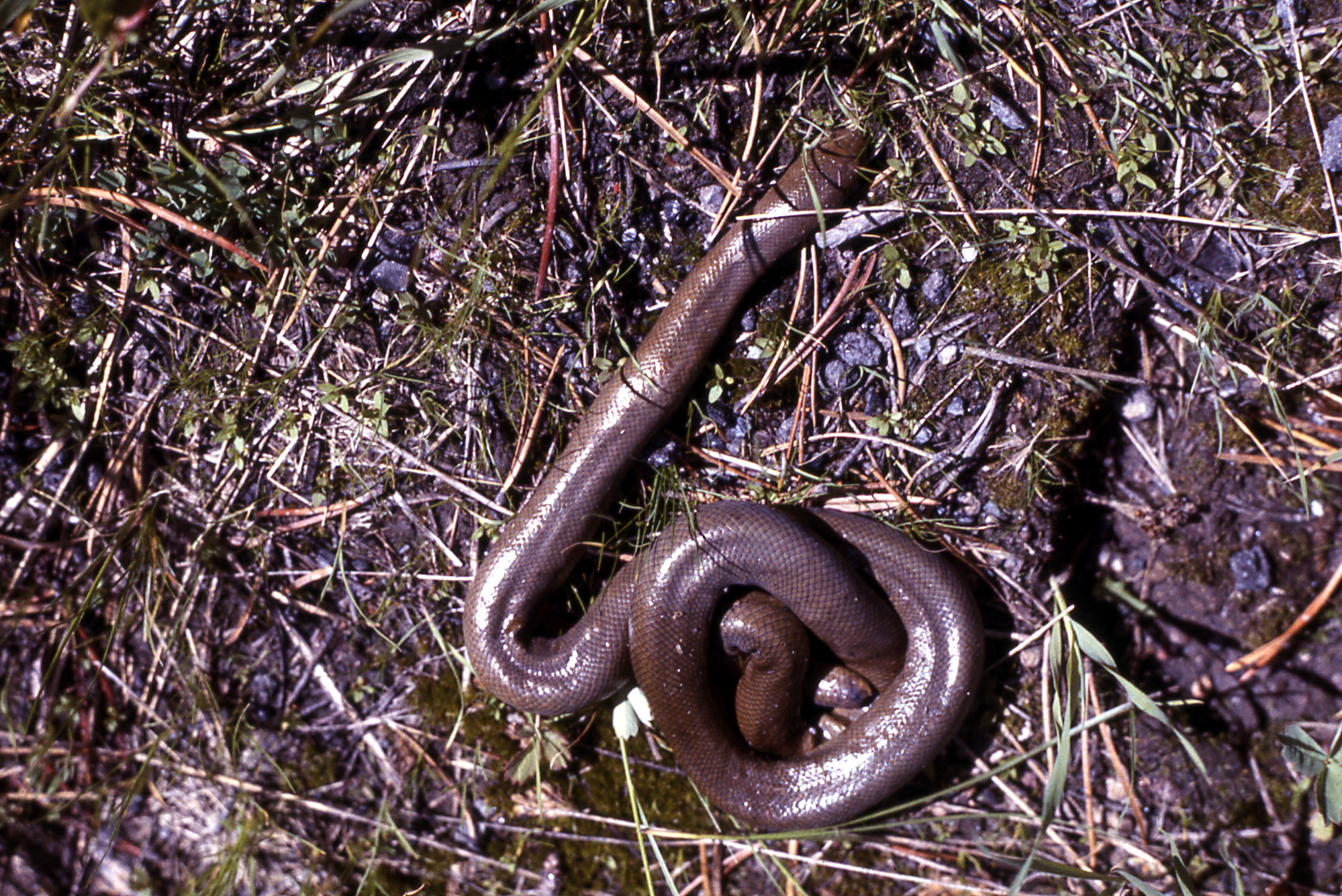
Rubber boa

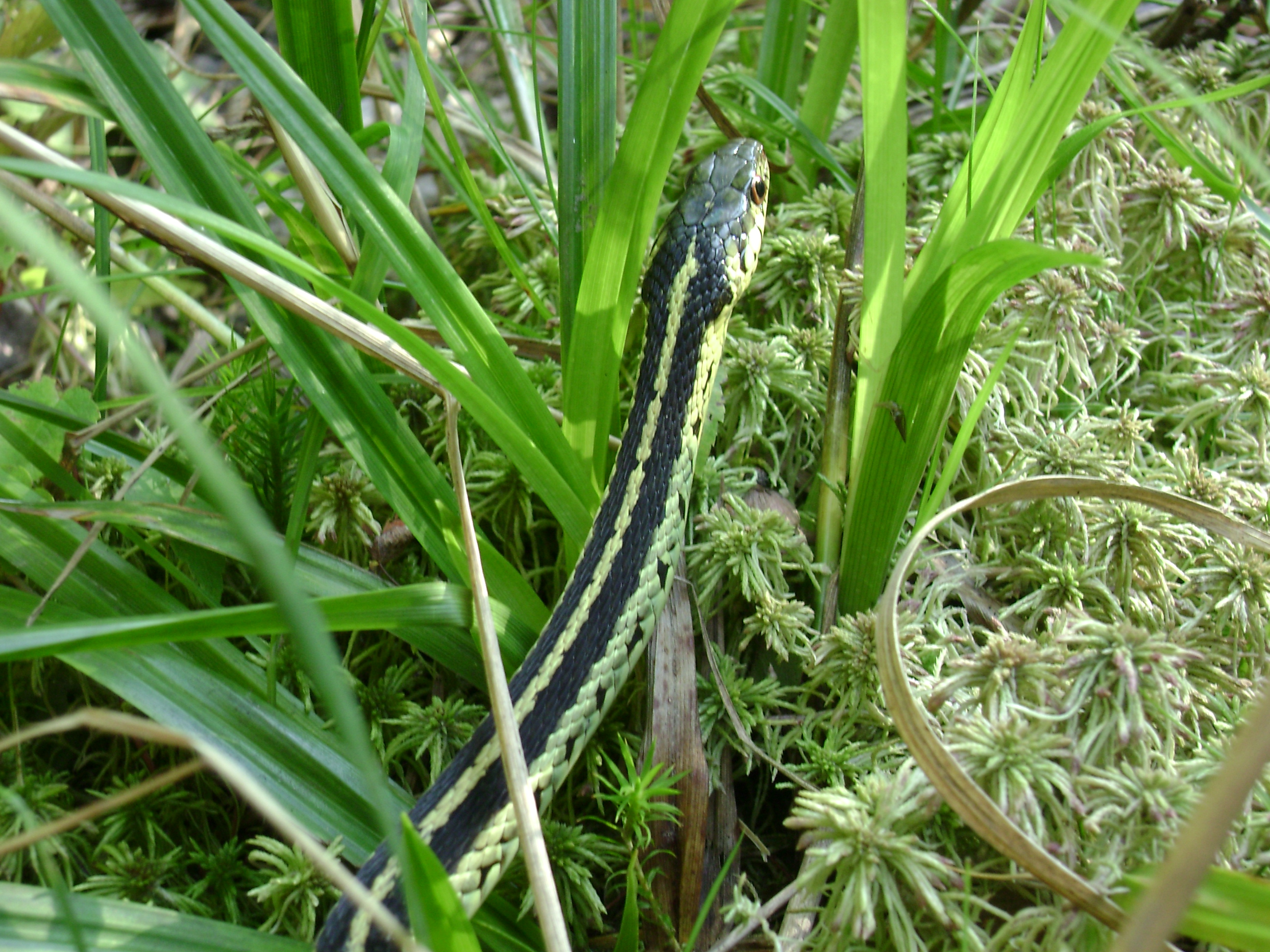
Common garter snake

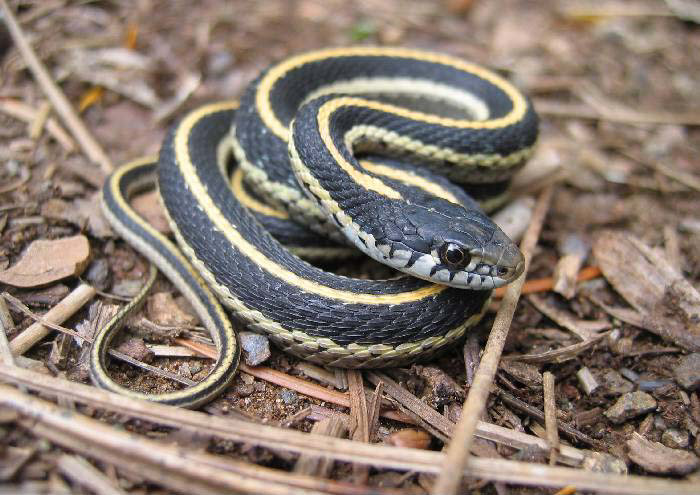
Terrestrial garter snake

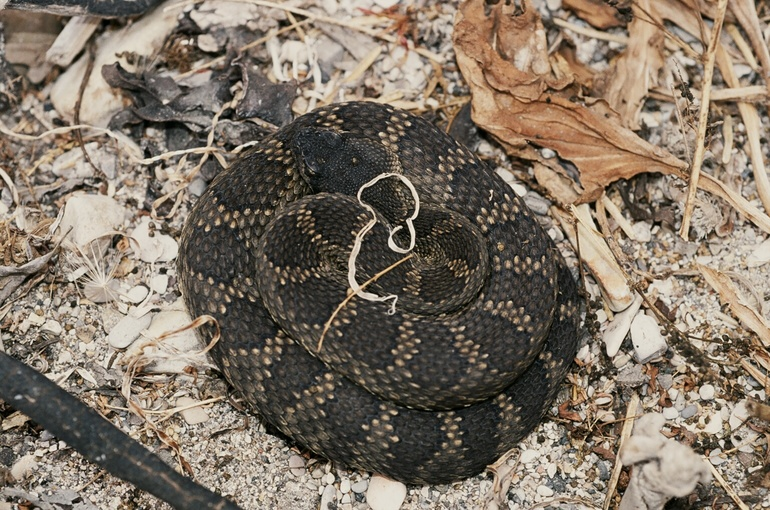
Western rattlesnake

=== Painted turtle ===
The painted turtle (Chrysemys picta) is the most widespread native turtle of North America. It lives in slow-moving fresh waters, from southern Canada to Louisiana and northern Mexico, and from the Atlantic to the Pacific. The turtle is the only species of the genus Chrysemys, which is part of the pond turtle family, Emydidae.

=== Western pond turtle ===
The western pond turtle (Actinemys marmorata or Emys marmorata) or Pacific pond turtle is a small to medium-sized turtle growing to approximately 20 cm (8 in) in carapace length. It is limited to the west coast of the United States of America and Mexico, ranging from western Washington state to northern Baja California.

=== Northern alligator lizard ===
The northern alligator lizard (Elgaria coerulea) is a medium-sized, slender-bodied lizard that occurs on the North American west coast. Adults reach a snout-to-vent length of about 10 cm (4 in) and a total length of roughly 25 cm (10 in). They have a distinct skin fold on their sides, separating the keeled scales on the back from the smooth ventral scales. They are brownish in color and often have dark blotches that sometimes blend together into bands. The belly is light gray. The eyes are dark. The northern alligator lizard occurs along the Pacific Coast and in the Rocky Mountains from southern British Columbia through Washington, northern Idaho and western Montana south through Oregon to the coastal range and the Sierra Nevada in central California.

=== Southern alligator lizard ===
The southern alligator lizard (Elgaria multicarinata) is a lizard native to the Pacific coast of North America. It is common throughout Southern California and can be found in grasslands, chaparral, and forests as well as urban areas. In dry climates, it is likely to be found in moist areas or near streams. Three subspecies can be distinguished: the California alligator lizard (E. m. multicarinata), the San Diego alligator lizard (E. m. webbii), and the Oregon alligator lizard (E. m. scincicauda).

=== Mojave black-collared lizard ===
The Great Basin collared lizard (Crotaphytus bicinctores), also known as the desert collared lizard or Mojave black-collared lizard, is a species of lizard in the genus Crotaphytus. It is very similar to the common collared lizard (C. collaris) in shape and size, but it lacks the bright extravagant colors of that species. Males can be brown to orange with some red or pink on the belly. Females are more black or dark brown. C. bicintores have elongated scales near the nails and their tail is more triangular in shape than that of C. collaris.

=== Long-nosed leopard lizard ===
The long-nosed leopard lizard, Gambelia wislizenii, is a relatively small lizard ranging from 3 1/4 – 5 3/4 inches (8.2-14.6 cm). It has a large head, long nose, and a long round tail that can be longer than its body. It is closely related to the blunt-nosed leopard lizard which it closely resembles in body proportions, but that species has a conspicuously blunt snout. They were once considered part of the genus Crotaphytus. The epithet wislizenii is in honor of the German-American surgeon and naturalist Frederick Adolph Wislizenus, who caught the first specimen near Santa Fe, New Mexico.

=== Short-horned lizard ===
The pygmy short-horned lizard (Phrynosoma douglasii) is a small lizard that occurs in North America. Like other horned lizards, it is often wrongly called a "horned toad" or "horny toad", but it is not a toad at all. It is a reptile, not an amphibian.

=== Desert horned lizard ===
The desert horned lizard (Phrynosoma platyrhinos) is a species of phrynosomatid lizard native to western North America. They are often referred to as "horny toads", although they are not toads, but lizards. They typically range from southern Idaho in the north to northern Mexico in the south. There are considered to be two subspecies: the northern desert horned lizard (Phrynosoma platyrhinos platyrhinos) ranging in Idaho, Wyoming, Utah, Nevada, the Colorado front range, and parts of southeastern Oregon; and the southern desert horned lizard (Phrynosoma platyrhinos calidiarum) ranging in southern Utah and Nevada to southeast California, western Arizona, and northern Baja California.

=== Common sagebrush lizard ===
The sagebrush lizard (Sceloporus graciosus graciosus) is a common lizard found in mid to high latitudes in the Western United States of America. It belongs to the genus Sceloporus (spiny lizards) in the lizard family Phrynosomatidae. Named after the sagebrush plants near which it is commonly found, the sagebrush lizard has keeled and spiny scales running along its dorsal surface.

=== Western skink ===
The western skink (Plestiodon skiltonianus) is a small, smooth-scaled lizard with relatively small limbs, measuring about 100 to 200 mm long. Western skinks are very adaptable. They spend much of their day basking in the sun. Their diet ranges widely, including spiders and beetles. Western Skinks will bite if grasped and will flee if they feel threatened. It is a common but secretive species whose range extends throughout Washington, Oregon, Nevada, Utah, and Wyoming and into western Montana and northern Arizona. It is widespread in northern California but restricted to the coast in central and southern California. Found in a variety of habitats, this lizard is most common in early successional stages or open areas of late successional stages. Heavy brush and densely forested areas are generally avoided. Western skinks are found from sea level to at least 2,130 m (6,990 ft). This diurnal reptile is active during the warm seasons.

=== Western fence lizard ===
The western fence lizard (Sceloporus occidentalis) is a common lizard of California and the surrounding area. Because the ventral abdomen of an adult is characteristically blue, it is also known as the blue-belly. Immature western fence lizards have aquamarine-colored bellies. It is a member of the genus Sceloporus, and therefore is a spiny lizard. Although California is the heart of the range of this lizard, it is also found in eastern and southwest Oregon, as well as in the Columbia River Gorge, southwest Idaho, Nevada, western Utah, and northwestern Baja California, and some of the islands off the coast of both California and Baja California. The western fence lizard occupies a variety of habitats. It is found in grassland, broken chaparral, sagebrush, woodland, coniferous forest, and farmland, and occupies elevations from sea level to 10,800 ft. They generally avoid the harsh desert.

=== Side-blotched lizard ===
The common side-blotched lizard (Uta stansburiana) is a species of side-blotched lizard common on the Pacific coast of North America, from Washington to western Texas and NW Mexico. It has a peculiar evolutionary strategy following the pattern of the game of Rock, Paper, Scissors, with three types of males existing, each of which applies a different technique to acquire mates (Sinervo & Lively, 1996; Sinervo, 2001; Alonzo & Sinervo, 2001; Sinervo & Clobert, 2001; Sinervo & Zamudio, 2001). The specific epithet, stansburiana, is in honor of Captain Howard Stansbury of the United States Corps of Topographical Engineers, who collected the first specimens while leading the 1849-1851 expedition to explore and survey the Great Salt Lake of Utah.

=== Western whiptail ===
The western whiptail (Aspidoscelis tigris (Baird and Girard, 1852)) is a small lizard (adults average 25 to 35 cm - about a foot - in length) that ranges throughout most of the southwestern United States. Most of its populations appear stable, and is not listed as endangered in any of the states comprising its range. It lives in a wide variety of habitats, including deserts and semiarid shrublands, usually in areas with sparse vegetation; also woodland, open dry forest, and riparian growth. It lives in burrows. Major differences between this species and the checkered whiptail (Aspidoscelis tesselatus) include the lack of enlarged scales anterior to the gular fold and the presence of enlarged antebatrachial scales. It was previously known as Cnemidophorus tigris, until phylogenetic analyses concluded that the genus Cnemidophorus was polyphyletic. Since it does not migrate, a number of forms have developed in different regions, several of which have been given sub-specific names - for example the California whiptail, Aspidoscelis tigris munda.

=== Plateau striped whiptail ===
The plateau striped whiptail (Cnemidophorus velox) is a lizard in the family Teiidae.

=== Rubber boa ===
The rubber boa (Charina bottae) is a snake in the genus Charina in the family Boidae. The family Boidae consists of the non-venomous snakes commonly called boas and consists of 43 species. The genus Charina consists of two species found in western North America.

=== Racer ===
The racer (Coluber constrictor) is a species of non-venomous colubrid snake. They are primarily found throughout the United States, east of the Rocky Mountains, but they range north into Canada, and south into Mexico, Guatemala and Belize. Racers typically grow to around 3 1/2 foot (107 cm) long, but some subspecies are capable of attaining lengths of 6 feet (1.8 metres). Their patterns vary widely between subspecies. Most are solid colored as their common names - e.g. black racer, brown racer, blue racer or green racer - imply. "Runner" is sometimes used instead of "racer" in their common name.

=== Sharptail snake ===
The sharp-tailed snake or sharptail snake (Contia tenuis) is a small, locally common colubrid snake that lives in the western United States. It is distributed through the states of California, Oregon, and Washington, as well as British Columbia, Canada.

=== Ringneck snake ===
The ringneck snake or ring-necked snake (Diadophis punctatus) is a species of colubrid snake. It is found throughout much of the United States, central Mexico, and south eastern Canada. Ring-necked snakes are secretive, nocturnal snakes that are rarely seen during the day time. They are slightly venomous but their non-aggressive nature and small rear-facing fangs pose little threat to humans who wish to handle them. They are best known for their unique defense posture of curling up their tails exposing their bright red-orange posterior ventral surface when threatened. Ring-necked snakes are believed to be fairly abundant throughout most of their range though no scientific evaluation supports this theory.

=== Night snake ===
The night snake (Hypsiglena torquata) is a species of rear-fanged colubrid snake. They are found through the south and western United States, as well as Mexico. The number of subspecies varies depending on the source, but it is generally accepted that there are 17. The night snake has been found as far north as southern British Columbia, and as far south as Guerrero, Mexico. The eastern range of the night snake extends to Texas. Still, not much is known as far as population densities and exact range due to the highly cryptic nature of the night snake.

=== Common kingsnake ===
The common kingsnake (Lampropeltis getula) is a harmless colubrid species found in the United States and Mexico. Eight subspecies are currently recognized.

=== California mountain kingsnake ===
The California mountain kingsnake (Lampropeltis zonata) is a species of nonvenomous colubrid snake. It is a coral snake mimic, having a similar pattern consisting of red, black and yellow on its body, but the snake is completely harmless. As its name suggests, the California mountain kingsnake is found mostly in the mountains of California. The California mountain kingsnake is endemic to western North America, in the western United States and northwest Mexico. It ranges from extreme southern Washington state, where it has a disjunct population, through Oregon and California, to northern Baja California.

=== Striped whipsnake ===
The striped whipsnake (Masticophis taeniatus) is a species of nonvenomous colubrid snake that is closely related to the California whipsnake (Masticophis lateralis). It is native to the western United States and northern Mexico. Their range extends from south central Washington south into the Great Basin between the Cascade-Sierran crest and the continental divide, southeast across the continental divide into New Mexico and western and central Texas, and south to Michoacán, Mexico. In the western United States the range also extends outside of the Great Basin into the Rogue River Valley in southwestern Oregon and northern California.

=== Pacific gopher snake ===
The gopher snake (Pituophis catenifer) is a harmless colubrid species found in North America. Six subspecies are currently recognized. The specific name catenifer is Latin for 'chain bearing', referring to the dorsal color pattern. They can be found in a variety of habitats ranging from desert shrub lands to low mountain areas. Like the racer, gopher snakes are also frequently found in agricultural areas, utilizing the abundant prey available.

=== Western ground snake ===
The western ground snake (Sonora semiannulata) is a species of small, harmless colubrid snake. It is sometimes referred to as the variable ground snake as its patterning and coloration can vary widely, even within the same geographic region. It is native to the southwestern United States, in Texas, New Mexico, Arizona, Oklahoma, Colorado, Kansas, Missouri, Utah and California, as well as northern Mexico, in Sonora, Chihuahua, Coahuila, Nuevo León, and Durango.

=== Santa Cruz garter snake ===
The aquatic garter snake (Thamnophis atratus) is a species of colubrid snake. Three subspecies are currently recognized. It is found exclusively along the coast of Oregon and California.

=== Western terrestrial garter snake ===
The western terrestrial garter snake (Thamnophis elegans) is a species of colubrid snake found in southwestern Canada and the western United States. Seven subspecies are currently recognized. Most individuals have a yellow, light orange, or white dorsal stripe, accompanied by two stripes on its side of the same color. Some varieties have red or black spots between the dorsal stripe and the side stripes. This snake often inhabits coniferous forests, and is relatively aquatic.

=== Northwestern garter snake ===
The northwestern garter snake (Thamnophis ordinoides) is a species of colubrid garter snake that lives in Oregon, Washington, California, and British Columbia. The garter snake is small, with adults averaging around 14-21 inches long. The northwestern garter snake is one of the most variable snakes in the world; however, no subspecies have been confirmed. The snake is most commonly found on the edge of meadows, surrounded by forest, as some sunshine is needed for their survival.

=== Common garter snake ===
The common garter snake (Thamnophis sirtalis) is a snake indigenous to North America. Most garter snakes have a pattern of yellow stripes on a brown background and their average length is about 1 to 1.5 meters (3.3 to 4.9 ft). The common garter snake is a diurnal snake. In summer, it is most active in the morning and late afternoon; in cooler seasons or climates, it restricts its activity to the warm afternoons.

=== Western rattlesnake ===
The western rattlesnake (Crotalus oregalus) is a venomous pitviper species found in North America in the western United States, parts of British Columbia and northwestern Mexico. Seven subspecies are currently recognized.

== See also ==
- Birds of Oregon
