= List of amphibians of Washington =

Amphibians in the State of Washington, United States, include salamanders, newts, frogs, and toads, listed below with their respective scientific names.

== Salamanders and newts ==
- Cascade torrent salamander – Rhyacotriton cascadae
- Coastal giant salamander – Dicamptodon tenebrosus
- Columbia torrent salamander – Rhyacotriton kezeri
- Cope's giant salamander – Dicamptodon copei
- Dunn's salamander – Plethodon dunni
- Larch Mountain salamander – Plethodon larselli
- Long-toed salamander – Ambystoma macrodactylum
- Northwestern salamander – Ambystoma gracile
- Olympic torrent salamander – Rhyacotriton olympicus
- Oregon ensatina – Ensatina eschscholtzii oregonensis
- Rough-skinned newt – Taricha granulosa
- Tiger salamander – Ambystoma tigrinum
- Van Dyke's salamander – Plethodon vandykei
- Western redback salamander – Plethodon vehiculum

== Frogs ==
- American bullfrog – Rana catesbeiana
- Cascades frog – Rana cascadae
- Coastal tailed frog – Ascaphus truei
- Columbia spotted frog – Rana luteiventris
- Green frog – Rana clamitans
- Northern leopard frog – Rana pipiens
- Northern red-legged frog – Rana aurora
- Oregon spotted frog – Rana pretiosa
- Pacific chorus frog – Pseudacris regilla
- Rocky Mountain tailed frog – Ascaphus montanus

== Toads ==
- Great Basin spadefoot – Spea intermontana
- Western toad – Bufo boreas
- Woodhouse's toad – Bufo woodhousii
