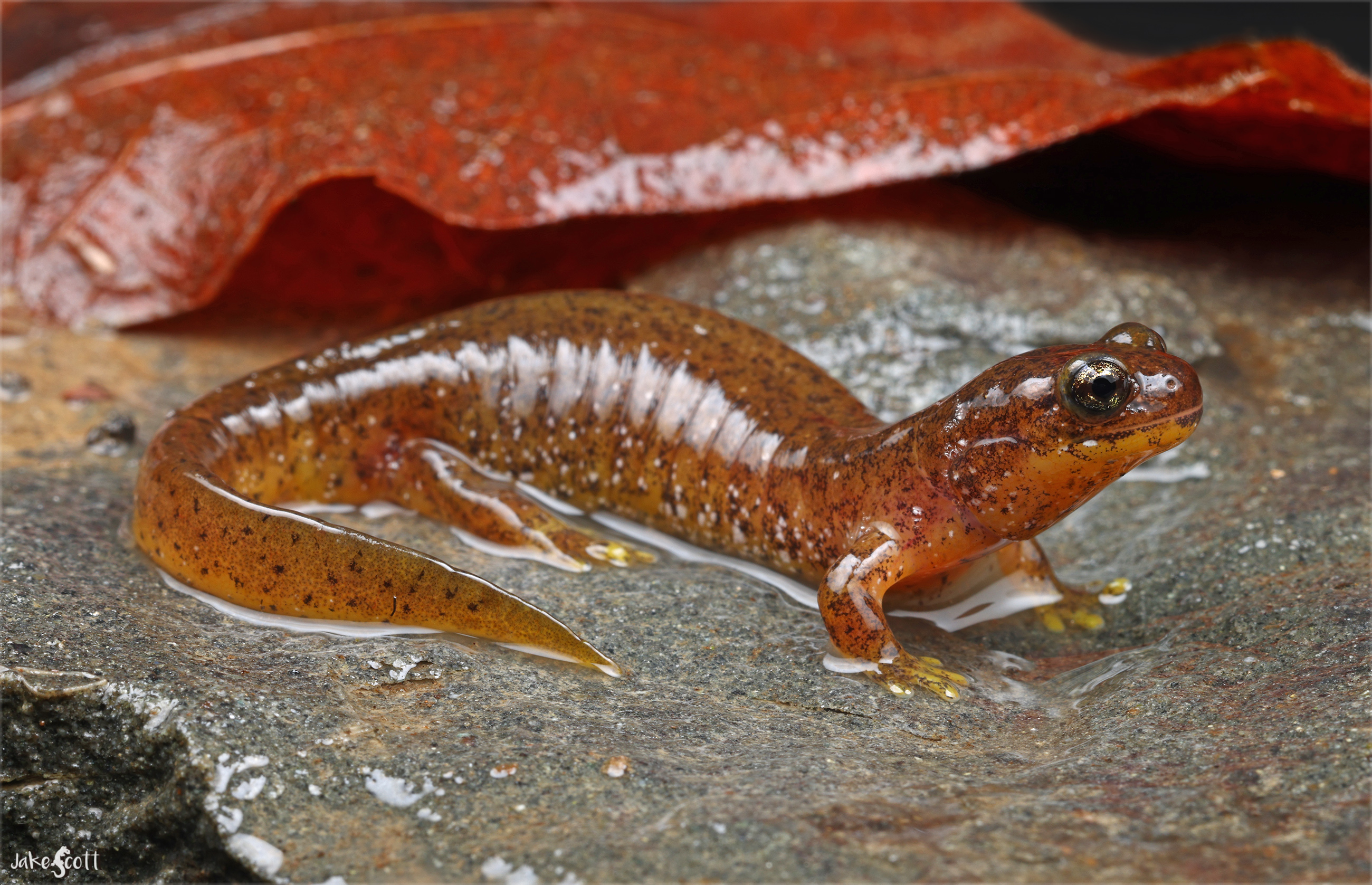

Conservation status
- Least Concern (IUCN 3.1)

Scientific classification
- Kingdom: Animalia
- Phylum: Chordata
- Class: Amphibia
- Order: Urodela
- Family: Rhyacotritonidae
- Genus: Rhyacotriton
- Species: R. variegatus

Binomial name
- Rhyacotriton variegatus Stebbins & Lowe, 1951

= Southern torrent salamander =

Species of amphibian

The southern torrent salamander (Rhyacotriton variegatus) is a member of the salamander family Rhyacotritonidae. This species of torrent salamander is found the farthest south in the Pacific Northwest region. It is a small salamander endemic from Northern California to Northern Oregon. It is one of four species of Rhyacotriton, along with R. cascadae, R. kezeri and R. olympicus. All species of Rhyacotriton are small, with their body lengths being less than 5 inches. The species reproduces annually, with an extended courtship and egg-laying period. The time it takes from oviposition to reach sexual maturity ranges from five to eight years, making the generation interval rather long. The larval stage, from hatching to metamorphosis, lasts 2.0-2.5 yr, with females requiring another 1.5–2.0 yr until they can first breed. They reach sexual maturity 1.0-1.5 yr after metamorphosis, which occurs between 4.5 and 5.0 yr. This species feeds on small insects and spiders. Although it is found over a large area, it is not a migratory creature. It is preyed on by Pacific giant salamanders and garter snakes.

== Identification ==
The species in the genus Rhyacotriton are all similar in morphology but have high genetic diversity. R. variegatus lives in aquatic environments from egg through metamorphic stages. Individuals live on the water's edge among pebbles and rocks through adulthood. R. variegatus has the lowest desiccation tolerance of all North American salamanders, meaning they cannot easily withstand "extreme" temperatures and low moisture levels. The habitats preferred by R. variegatus are calm, shallow, high in oxygen, and slow-flowing, such as seeps and mountain brooks, with coarse, gravel-like beds. These water sources are found mainly in forests, where R. variegatus is most often seen. All species of Rhyacotriton have aquatic eggs and larvae, and adults are semi-aquatic. R. variegatus adults can venture away from the stream, but they prefer the water, which only comes out when the moisture level of the ground is high enough. Adults and juveniles are subject to moisture loss as well as heat shock.

== General description and taxonomy ==
The southern torrent salamanders are small salamanders; mature adults measure 1.5–2.4 inches from snout to vent. On their dorsal sides, they are brown with darker spots. Their ventral sides are more yellow, with the same spots as the dorsal sides. The colors vary by shade; the dorsal sides range from dark olive to dark brown. Their eyes face forward and are large and dark, and metallic flecks surround the eyes. Males are distinguished from the females by their square cloacal lobes. Lungs of the adults are also reduced in appearance. Their bodies are slender, with long tails about the same length as their torsos. They have four legs, set in pairs – two close to the head and two near the base of the tail. They have four toes at the base of the leg used to grip and climb. Generally, they have blunt noses and protruding eyes.

== Geographic distribution ==
The genus Rhyacotriton is found in the Pacific Northwest, extending from Northern California to the Olympic Peninsula. R. variegatus is endemic to the southernmost part of the range, extending from California to Oregon. Populations of R. variegatus are found in forests of the states' coastal region. Some Rhyacotriton species are found more inland but are still relatively close to the coast; these are mainly populations of R. kezeri. The areas with populations of R. variegatus are forests with fresh water sources that meet all their habitat requirements. Although most of the population is in one continuous range, a smaller population separated from the main range is found in southwest Oregon. Though disconnected from the range, it is still close to the coastline.

== Ecology ==
R. variegatus occurs in coastal coniferous forests in California and Oregon. Older forests are more likely to maintain a population of southern torrent salamanders. These forests have >80% canopy coverage due to sizeable trees and large amounts of moss. Some younger forests have the proper habitat to keep a population, but it is unusual to see a population living in a young forest. Reproduction occurs in the water, where the fertilized eggs are laid and abandoned. Mating occurs after an extended courtship and is followed by a long egg-laying process. The eggs take quite some time to hatch, and the larval stage lasts about 2.0-2.5 yr. Usually, the female lays one egg at a time, but occasionally, clutches of eight to 11 eggs are found.

== Conservation ==
Efforts have been made to conserve this species. After being assessed, it was placed in the "Least Concern" category, meaning there is no immediate threat to the species' survival, and it has a wide distribution with an assumed large population. Despite no immediate threat to the southern torrent salamander, urbanization is beginning to encroach on its habitat. Direct effects from logging and disturbing forests, along with the building of roads and other man-made features, limit the habitable areas for these salamanders. Other indirect effects of urbanization are those that affect the environment's temperature. R. variegatus is extremely sensitive to temperature fluctuations, having a very narrow range of temperatures in which it can thrive. The salamanders will begin to show temperature stress at about 63 °F. If the temperature of mountain streams and brooks rises over the next few years, the species will either adapt or succumb to the warm temperature. In California, R. variegatus is a Species of Special Concern. The composition of the ground in the habitat is also quite important. If the texture of the components is too fine, then the environment would not be ideal. R. variegatus needs large, pebble-like particles to hide and avoid predators. Many concerned people still petition to place R. variegatus in a more at-risk category because of the previously unregulated logging that altered the population. The species will remain at least concern status until the populations become more threatened.

== See also ==
- Rhyacotriton olympicus
- Torrent salamander
