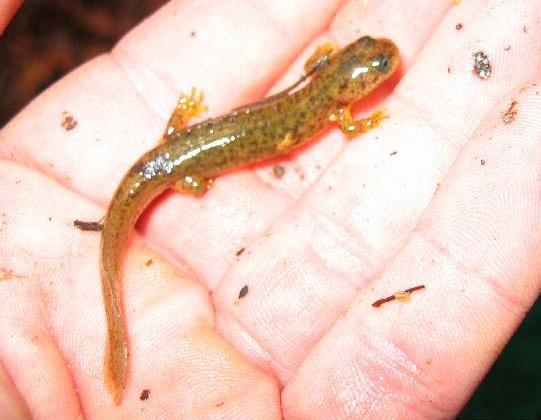
- Rhyacotriton variegatus

Scientific classification
- Kingdom: Animalia
- Phylum: Chordata
- Class: Amphibia
- Order: Urodela
- Suborder: Salamandroidea
- Family: Rhyacotritonidae; Tihen, 1958
- Genus: Rhyacotriton; Dunn, 1920

Species
- Rhyacotriton cascadae (blue); Rhyacotriton kezeri (green); Rhyacotriton olympicus (red); Rhyacotriton variegatus (yellow)
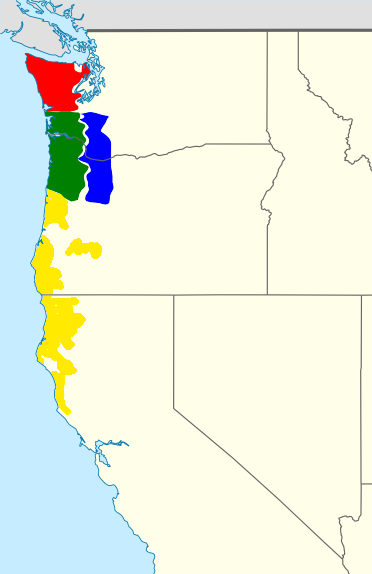

= Torrent salamander =

Torrent salamanders

Family of salamanders

The torrent salamanders or Cascade salamanders are a family of salamanders (Rhyacotritonidae) with only one genus, Rhyacotriton. The torrent salamanders have highly reduced lungs and are endemic to the United States from northwestern Washington to northwestern California, where they live in cool and shaded stream habitats in moist coniferous forests.

== Description ==
Maximum adult snout-vent length is 6 cm (2.4 in). They have complete metamorphosis, but a few neotenic traits have been found, like the presence of conical teeth and reduced or absent nasal bones. Nasal bones have never been seen in Rhyacotriton olympicus but are present in some specimens of the other species, and occurs most often in R. variegatus. The lungs are minute; in R. olympicus they are only 5–7 mm (0.2‒0.3 in.) in length, though highly vascular and filled with air. They are very sensitive to desiccation and warm temperatures. More than 28 °C (83 °F) can be fatal, and they can tolerate a water loss of only 19.4% of initial body weight at most (compared to 29.0% to 32.9% for other species). Because of this, they are rarely found more than a meter away from free-running water. On rare occasions adults can be found under objects a few meters from water after heavy rain. Males have a unique vent gland.

== Reproduction ==
Courtship is terrestrial. The male deposits a spermatophore on the ground, which is then picked up by the female. The eggs have a pale yellow-white ova, and are deposited separately and haphazardly in slow-flowing water. Sometimes communal oviposition occurs. They are attached neither to each other nor to the substrate, which is unique in salamanders. Parental care is absent.

== Species ==
The genus Rhyacotriton includes four species:

- Cascade torrent salamander (R. cascadae)
- Columbia torrent salamander (R. kezeri)
- Olympic torrent salamander (R. olympicus)
- Southern torrent salamander (R. variegatus)

== Taxonomy ==
Originally the genus Rhyacotriton was placed in the family Ambystomatidae, later in the family Dicamptodontidae, and finally in 1992 it was placed into a family of its own. At the same time, genetic analysis provided evidence to split the only known species R. olympicus into four species.

== Intrinsic Phylogeny ==
- - - Rhyacotriton kezeri
    - Rhyacotriton cascadae
  - - Rhyacotriton olympicus
    - Rhyacotriton variegatus

Intrinsic Phylogeny of genus Rhyacotriton.
