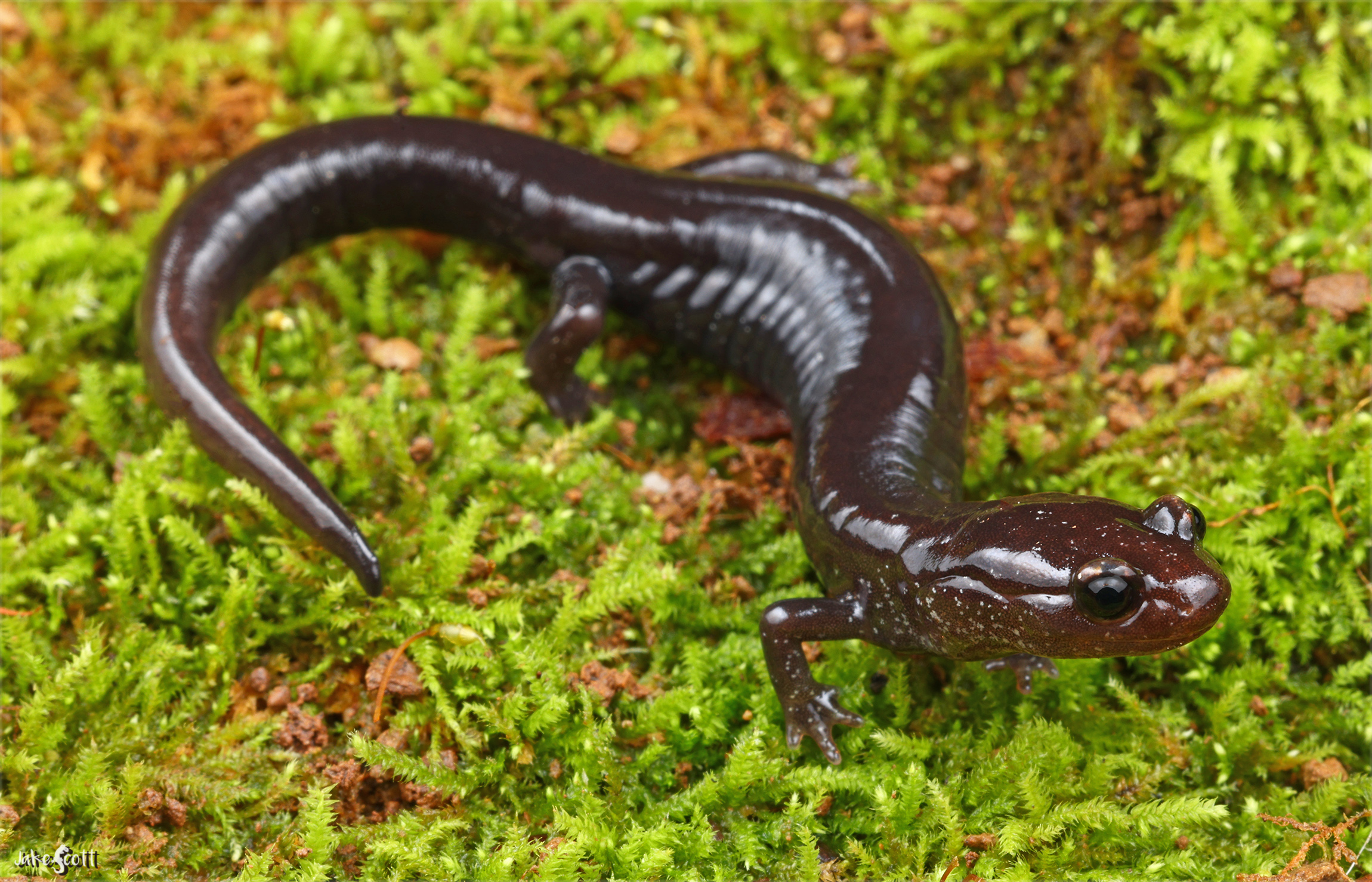

Conservation status
- Least Concern (IUCN 3.1)

Scientific classification
- Kingdom: Animalia
- Phylum: Chordata
- Class: Amphibia
- Order: Urodela
- Family: Plethodontidae
- Genus: Plethodon
- Species: P. elongatus

Binomial name
- Plethodon elongatus Van Denburgh, 1916

= Del Norte salamander =

Species of amphibian

The Del Norte salamander (Plethodon elongatus) is a species of salamander in the family Plethodontidae endemic to the United States in southwestern Oregon and northwestern California.

== Description ==
Plethodon elongatus is a medium-sized, slender salamander. Adults are 6–7.5 cm (2.4–3.0 in) from snout to vent, and 11–15 cm (4.3–5.9 in) in total length. Limbs are relatively short; toes are short and slightly webbed. Dorsal coloration is dark brown or black. A reddish or reddish-brown straight-edged mid-dorsal stripe may extend from the head to the tip of the tail; the stripe may be less pronounced in older animals.

== Life history ==
P. elongatus is a fully terrestrial salamander. Clutch size is three to 11 eggs (mean eight). No free-living larval stage exists, and juveniles hatch completely metamorphosed, measuring about 18 mm (0.71 in) in snout–vent length.

== Habitat and conservation ==
The species occurs in areas of moist talus and rocky substrates in redwood or Douglas fir forests. It is typically encountered among moss-covered rocks or under bark and other forest litter, usually avoiding very wet areas.

The Del Norte salamander is locally abundant in suitable habitat. It is threatened by habitat loss caused by logging.
