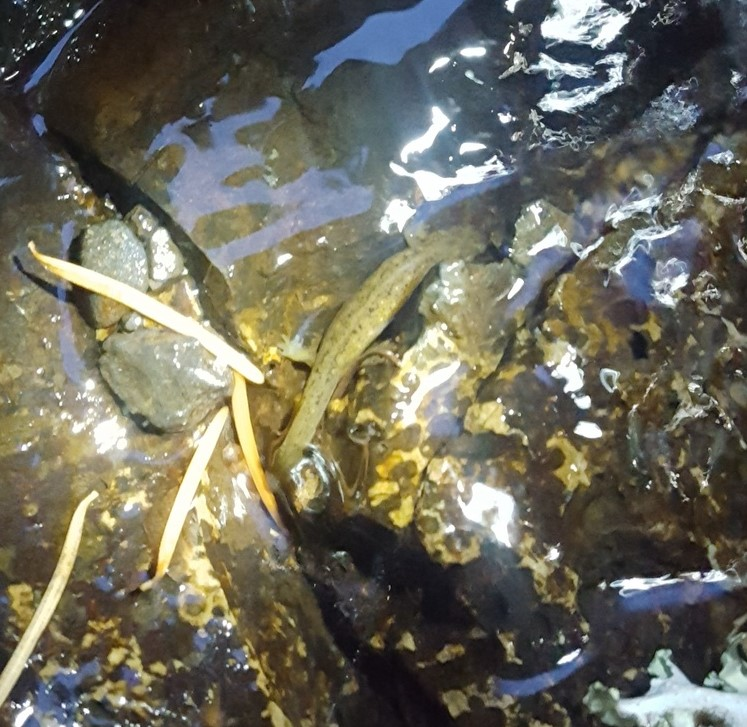
- In Lewis and Clark National Historic Trail, Oregon, US

Conservation status
- Near Threatened (IUCN 3.1)

Scientific classification
- Kingdom: Animalia
- Phylum: Chordata
- Class: Amphibia
- Order: Urodela
- Family: Rhyacotritonidae
- Genus: Rhyacotriton
- Species: R. cascadae

Binomial name
- Rhyacotriton cascadae Good & Wake, 1992

= Cascade torrent salamander =

Species of amphibian

The Cascade torrent salamander (Rhyacotriton cascadae) is a species of salamander in the family Rhyacotritonidae. They are small salamanders, with adults averaging about 2 inches (5 cm) measured from snout to vent. Their color ranges from tan to brown to black, and they usually exhibit yellowish underbellies and spotted sides. They are endemic to the Pacific Northwest in the United States, where they are found from Skamania County in Washington south to Lane County in Oregon on the west slope of the Cascade Mountains.

Their natural habitats are temperate forests, rivers and streams, and freshwater springs. They are threatened by habitat loss. These salamanders are typically found under rocks and fallen logs. As far as movement, Cascade torrent salamander can stay in a small area over very long periods. They also tend to move parallel to the streams they live by. Living by the stream creates a wide range of general lifespan because the salamanders can die from severe flooding of the stream.
