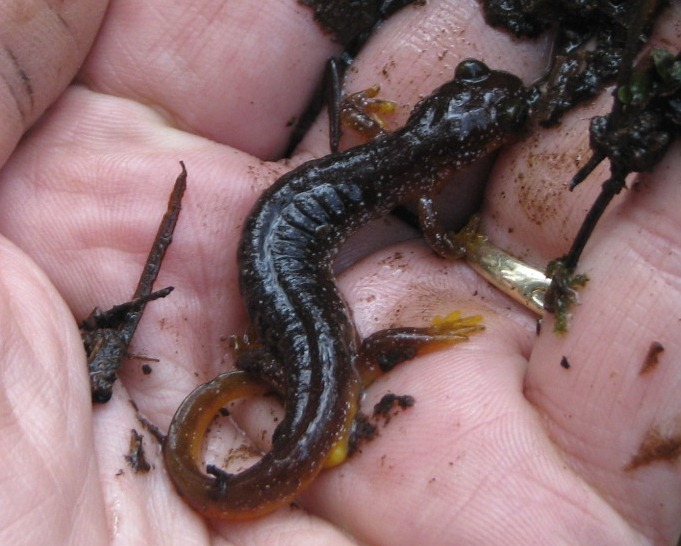
- In Washington state, US

Conservation status
- Near Threatened (IUCN 3.1)

Scientific classification
- Kingdom: Animalia
- Phylum: Chordata
- Class: Amphibia
- Order: Urodela
- Family: Rhyacotritonidae
- Genus: Rhyacotriton
- Species: R. kezeri

Binomial name
- Rhyacotriton kezeri Good & Wake, 1992

= Columbia torrent salamander =

Species of amphibian

The Columbia torrent salamander (Rhyacotriton kezeri) is a species of salamander in the family Rhyacotritonidae, endemic to the Pacific Northwest in the United States. It is found in the coastal areas of Washington to northwestern Oregon.

Its natural habitats are temperate forests, rivers, and freshwater springs. It is a small salamander (up to 10 cm total length) that lives in clear, cold, mountain streams. It is threatened by habitat loss. Due to their egg disposition being in enigmatic and obscure locations, there are not many clear patterns as to where this species of salamander lays their eggs. Therefore, leading to inconclusive results on their reproductive ecology.
