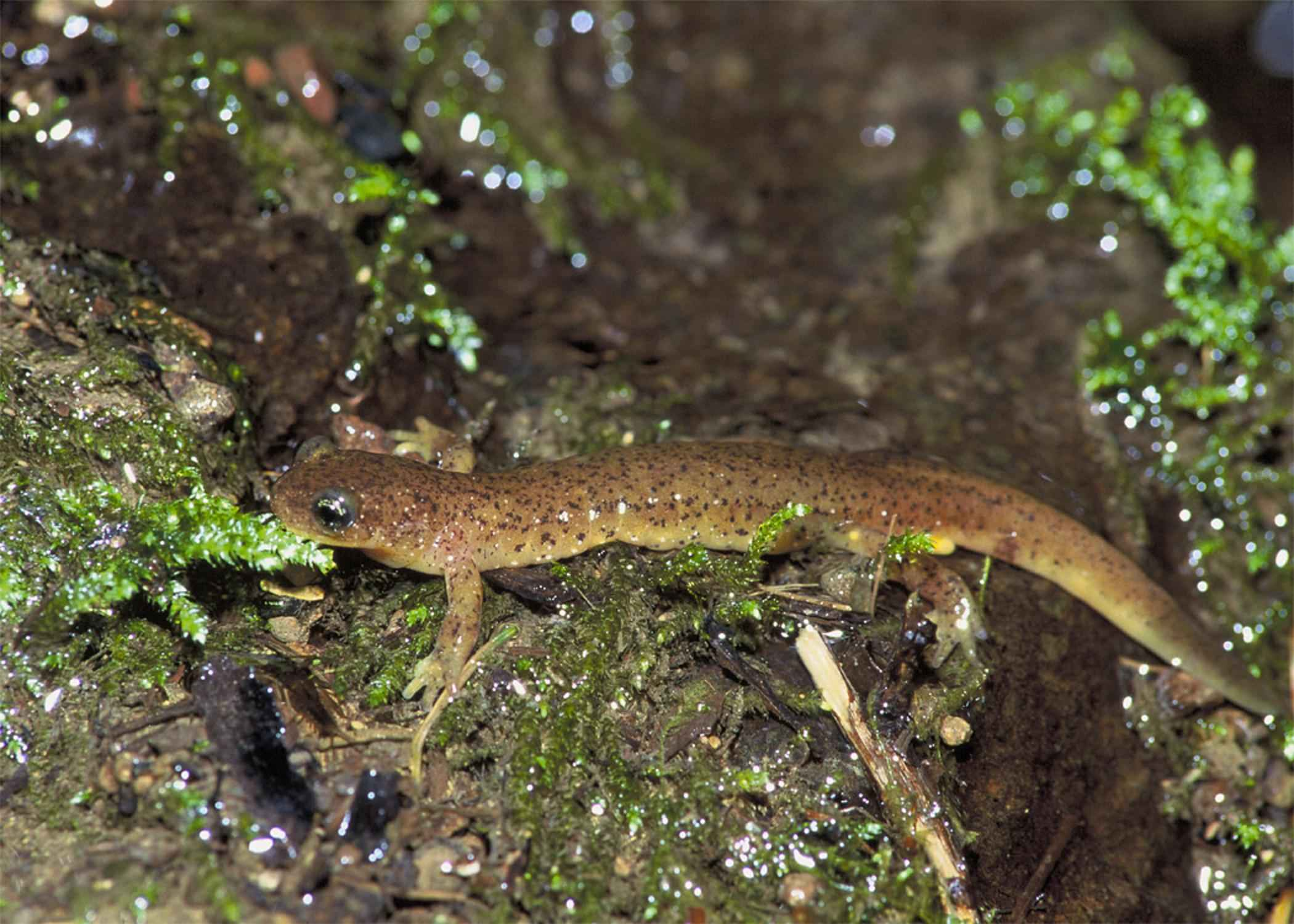

Conservation status
- Near Threatened (IUCN 3.1)

Scientific classification
- Kingdom: Animalia
- Phylum: Chordata
- Class: Amphibia
- Order: Urodela
- Family: Rhyacotritonidae
- Genus: Rhyacotriton
- Species: R. olympicus

Binomial name
- Rhyacotriton olympicus (Gaige, 1917)
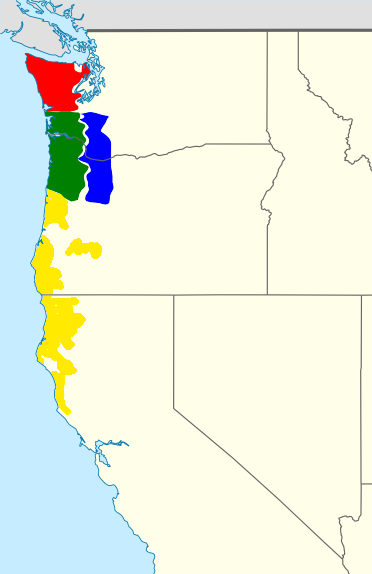
- Map of the genus Rhyacotriton; R. olympicus in red, R. kezeri in green, R. cascadae in blue, R. variegatus in yellow

Synonyms
- Ranodon olympicus Gaige, 1917; Rhyacotriton olympicus olympicus Stebbins & Lowe, 1951

= Olympic torrent salamander =

Species of amphibian

The Olympic torrent salamander (Rhyacotriton olympicus) is a morphologically distinctive, highly derived species of salamander in the family Rhyacotritonidae endemic to the Olympic Peninsula of Washington, where it lives in clear, cold mountain streams. While it is small, it tends to be the largest Rhyacotriton species.

== History of classification ==
It has a very complicated taxonomic history, originally being described in 1917 by Helen Thompson Gaige as Ranodon olympicus, due to proposed similarity to R. sibericus. It was later given its own genus, Rhyacotriton, by Emmett Reid Dunn in 1920, but was placed within the family Ambystomatidae, thought to be more closely related to the genus Ambystoma than Ranodon; later, it was given its own subfamily, Rhyacotritoninae, as a close relative of Dicamptodon in Dicamptodontinae by Joseph Anton Tihen. Afterward, it was placed into Dicamptodontinae by Philip Joe Regal in 1966, which was elevated to its own family, Dicamptodontidae, by James L. Edwards in 1976. It was ultimately given its own family by David A. Good and David Burton Wake in 1992, being considered a monotypic genus until they and Gloria Z. Wurst recognized that it likely included several species in 1987.

== Description ==
The adult males have distinctive squared vent lobes, a diagnostic feature of torrent salamanders; in both sexes, the vent is a lengthwise slit with a distinctive crosswise groove at the back. Adults can reach a snout-vent length of 4.1 to 6.2 centimeters, or 1.6 to 2.4 inches, and a total length of as much as 12 centimeters, or 4.7 inches. The tail is shorter than the snout-vent length, laterally compressed, ridged on top, and has an obtuse tail tip. It has shiny, closely pitted skin, with a brown back, a speckling of white guanophores that tends to cluster on the sides, a scattering of dark spots that occasionally appear on the underside, the upper parts of the limbs a lighter brown interrupted by darker mottling, some dark brown spots on the neck and chin, and a yellowish underside. It has very small lungs for its size, with one 12.5 cm long specimen having 7 mm lungs. It has 14 costal grooves, and a prominent dorsal groove running from the back of the head to the tail. They have short but well-developed limbs that don't meet by 2 intercostal spaces when lying flat along the sides, with five distinct, rounded toes ending in small knobs; the 3rd toe is the longest, the 2nd and 4th equal, and the 1st and 5th equal. They have short, rounded snouts with small, depressed heads, with small nostrils closer to the end of the snout than the eyes, and the distance between them equaling the space between the eyes; the internal nares are small and closer together than the external openings. They have large, prominent eyes with "swollen" eyelids, with the width of the upper eyelid fitting 1.5 times into the space between the eyes, and a pronounced vertical fold at the back corner of the eye.

== Habitat ==
Its natural habitats are temperate forests, rivers, and freshwater springs. These salamanders live at the edges of clear, cold, mountain streams; they can be abundant under gravel at stream edges and in the spray zones of waterfalls. During rainy seasons, they are occasionally found under objects on land away from streams.

== Conservation ==
It is threatened by habitat loss.

Potential predators of Olympic torrent salamanders include giant salamanders and garter snakes.
