= List of amphibians of Colorado =

Coordinates: 38.9972°N 105.5478°W

The location of the State of Colorado in the United States of America.

Amphibians found in the U.S. State of Colorado include wild salamanders, frogs, and toads.

== Salamanders ==
Image	Species	Common name	Family
	Ambystoma mavortium	Tiger salamander	Ambystomatidae

== Frogs ==
Photo	Species	Common name	Family
	Acris blanchardi	Blanchard's cricket frog	Hylidae
	Dryophytes arenicolor	Canyon treefrog	Hylidae
	Pseudacris maculata	Boreal chorus frog	Hylidae
	Gastrophryne olivacea	Great Plains narrowmouth toad*	Microhylidae
	Lithobates blairi	Plains leopard frog	Ranidae
	Lithobates catesbeianus	Bullfrog^{†}	Ranidae
	Lithobates pipiens	Northern leopard frog	Ranidae
	Lithobates sylvaticus	Wood frog	Ranidae

*Although it bears the common name "toad", Gastrophryne olivacea is taxonomically a frog.

^{†}Bullfrogs are an introduced and invasive species in Colorado.

== Toads ==
Image	Species	Common name	Family
	Anaxyrus boreas	Western toad	Bufonidae
	Anaxyrus cognatus	Great Plains toad	Bufonidae
	Anaxyrus debilis	Chihuahuan green toad	Bufonidae
	Anaxyrus punctatus	Red-spotted toad	Bufonidae
	Anaxyrus woodhousii	Woodhouse's toad	Bufonidae
	Scaphiopus couchii	Couch's spadefoot	Scaphiopodidae
	Spea bombifrons	Plains spadefoot	Scaphiopodidae
	Spea intermontana	Great Basin spadefoot	Scaphiopodidae
	Spea multiplicata	New Mexico spadefoot	Scaphiopodidae

== See also ==
- Bibliography of Colorado
- Geography of Colorado
- History of Colorado
- Index of Colorado-related articles
- List of Colorado-related lists
- Outline of Colorado
