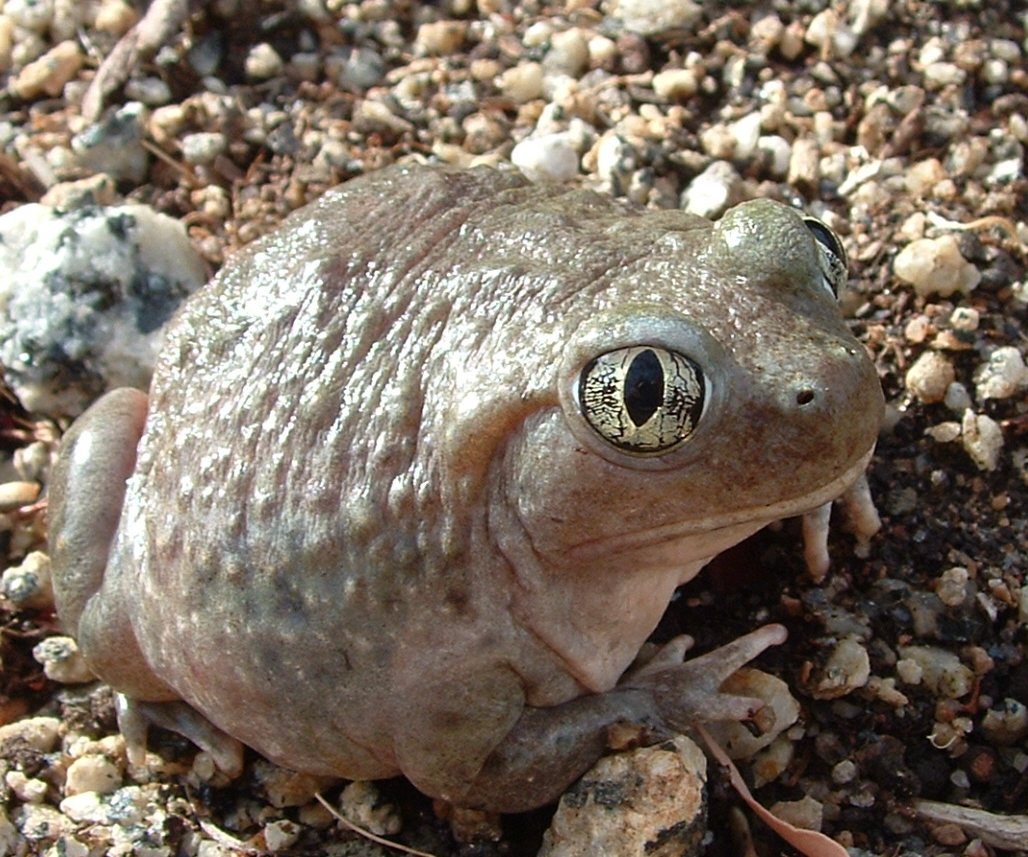
- Western Spadefoot Toad (Spea hammondii)

Scientific classification
- Kingdom: Animalia
- Phylum: Chordata
- Class: Amphibia
- Order: Anura
- Family: Scaphiopodidae
- Genus: Spea; Cope, 1866

= Spea =

Western spadefoot toad

Genus of amphibians

Spea is a genus of North American amphibian commonly referred to as the western spadefoot toads. They differ greatly from true toads (those of the family Bufonidae) by having eyes with vertical pupils, no parotoid glands, and relatively smooth skin. Their most distinctive feature is a spade-like projection on their hind feet, from which their common name is derived. This projection enables spadefoot toads to dig in loose soils with ease. Its name is from the Ancient Greek speos (σπέος, ‘cave, cavern’)

== Species ==
Spea species were once classified with their European cousins in the family Pelobatidae, but have since been reclassified to their own family, Scaphiopodidae with other North American species. There are four extant species in the genus Spea:

- Plains spadefoot toad, Spea bombifrons (Cope, 1863)
- Western spadefoot toad, Spea hammondii (Baird, 1859)
- Great Basin spadefoot toad, Spea intermontana (Cope, 1863)
- New Mexico spadefoot toad, Spea multiplicata (Cope, 1863)
- †Spea labreae Cruz & Lindsey, 2026

== Related species ==
Genus Scaphiopus, southern spadefoot toads

- Couch's spadefoot toad, Scaphiopus couchii (Baird, 1854)
- Eastern spadefoot (toad), Scaphiopus holbrookii (Harlan, 1835)
- Hurter's spadefoot toad, Scaphiopus hurterii (Strecker, 1910)
