= Eastern spadefoot =

Eastern spadefoot or eastern spadefoot toad may refer to:

- Scaphiopus holbrookii or eastern spadefoot, a toad found in North America
- Pelobates syriacus or eastern spadefoot, a toad found in Eastern Europe and the Middle East
- Eastern spadefoot toads (Leptobrachium), a genus of Southeast Asian toads, from family Megophryidae, unrelated to the above species
