= Western spadefoot toad =

Western spadefoot or western spadefoot toad is the common name of two different species of toads:

- Spea hammondii, found in North America
- Pelobates cultripes, found in Europe
