= Spea labreae =

Spea labreae Temporal range: Late Pleistocene–Holocene

Scientific classification
- Kingdom: Animalia
- Phylum: Chordata
- Class: Amphibia
- Order: Anura
- Family: Scaphiopodidae
- Genus: Spea
- Species: S. labreae

Binomial name
- Spea labreae Cruz & Lindsey, 2026

Extinct frog species

Spea labreae is an extinct species of North American spadefoot toad (family Scaphiopodidae) in the genus Spea, known from Pleistocene–Holocene-dated fossils collected from the La Brea Tar Pits in California, United States. The bones were excavated in 1929 but remained undescribed until their description in 2026. S. labreae was about seven percent larger than extant species of Spea.

== See also ==
- Paleobiota of the La Brea Tar Pits
