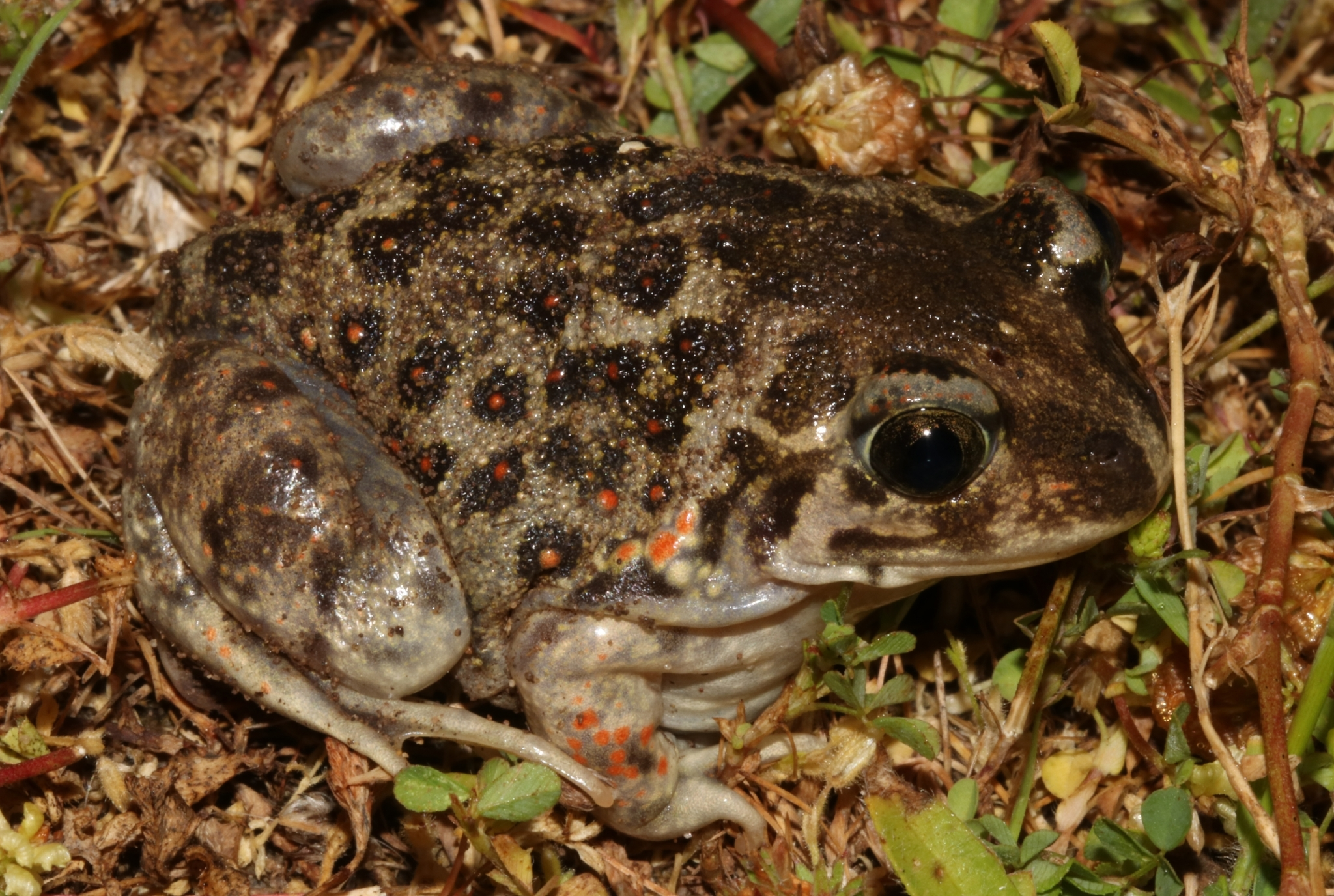
- Subspecies P. b. chloeae in Greece

Conservation status
- Least Concern (IUCN 3.1)

Scientific classification
- Kingdom: Animalia
- Phylum: Chordata
- Class: Amphibia
- Order: Anura
- Family: Pelobatidae
- Genus: Pelobates
- Species: P. balcanicus

Binomial name
- Pelobates balcanicus Karaman, 1928

Synonyms
- Pelobates syriacus balcanicus Karaman, 1928

= Pelobates balcanicus =

Species of amphibian

Pelobates balcanicus, commonly called the Balkan spadefoot, is a species of toad in the family Pelobatidae, native to the Balkan Peninsula, with ranges in Albania, Bulgaria, Greece, North Macedonia, Serbia, and Türkiye.

== Taxonomy ==
Long considered a subspecies of Pelobates syriacus, phylogenetic evidence demonstrated that it is a standalone species in 2019.

The Balkan spadefoot has two subspecies:

- P. b. balcanicus - The nominate subspecies occurs over most of the species' range.
- P. b. chloeae - Occurs near type location of Metochi, Peloponnese, and perhaps elsewhere on the island.
