= Pelobates varaldii =

Conservation status
- Endangered (IUCN 3.1)

Scientific classification
- Kingdom: Animalia
- Phylum: Chordata
- Class: Amphibia
- Order: Anura
- Family: Pelobatidae
- Genus: Pelobates
- Species: P. varaldii

Binomial name
- Pelobates varaldii Pasteur and Bons, 1959

Species of frog

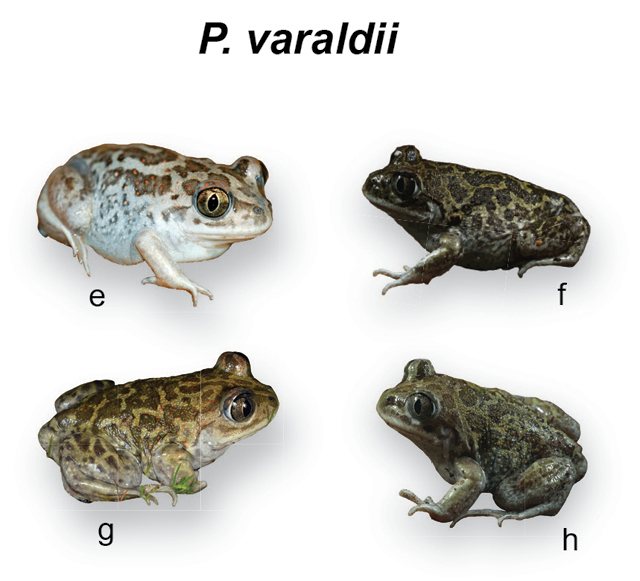
Color variation in Pelobates varaldii

Pelobates varaldii, the Moroccan spadefoot toad, Moroccan spadefoot, or Varaldi's spadefoot toad, is a species of frog in the family Pelobatidae. As currently known, it is endemic to the coastal north-western Morocco, although there is an unconfirmed record from the Spanish territory of Melilla that could possibly represent this species. The specific name varaldii honours Marcel Varaldi who collected amphibians and reptiles in Morocco.

== Description ==
Males grow to 65 mm (2.6 in) and females to 70 mm (2.8 in) in snout–vent length. The overall appearance is stocky. The snout is sharp. The tympanum is present but inconspicuous. No parotoid glands are present. The dorsum is finely glandular and smooth; colouration is grey-brown with irregular darker markings. There can be red speckles above the eyes. The ventral side of the body is white. The hind feet have enlarged metatarsal tubercles (used in digging) and webbed toes.

The male advertisement call is aloud, harsh clucking.

The tadpoles can reach 130 mm (5.1 in) in length.

== Habitat and conservation ==
Pelobates varaldii occurs in lowland sandy uncultivated soils, sometimes in the vicinity of cork woodlands, at elevations below 350 m (1,150 ft). It is generally fossorial. Spawning typically takes place in temporary bodies of standing water (e.g., dayas and rain puddles). The tadpoles are aquatic and feed on plankton and detritus.

This species does not occur in modified habitats. It is threatened by habitat loss and degradation caused by the conversion of land to livestock pasture as well as the pollution of ponds with livestock droppings. Also the introduced Gambusia holbrooki is a threat. This species might be present in the Merja Zerga Biological Reserve.
