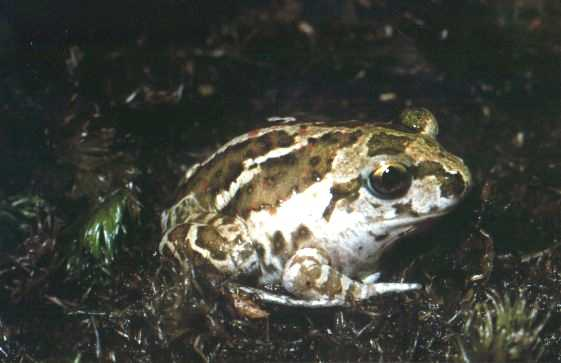
- Pelobates fuscus fuscus

Scientific classification
- Kingdom: Animalia
- Phylum: Chordata
- Class: Amphibia
- Order: Anura
- Suborder: Mesobatrachia
- Superfamily: Pelobatoidea
- Family: Pelobatidae; Bonaparte, 1850

Genera
- See text
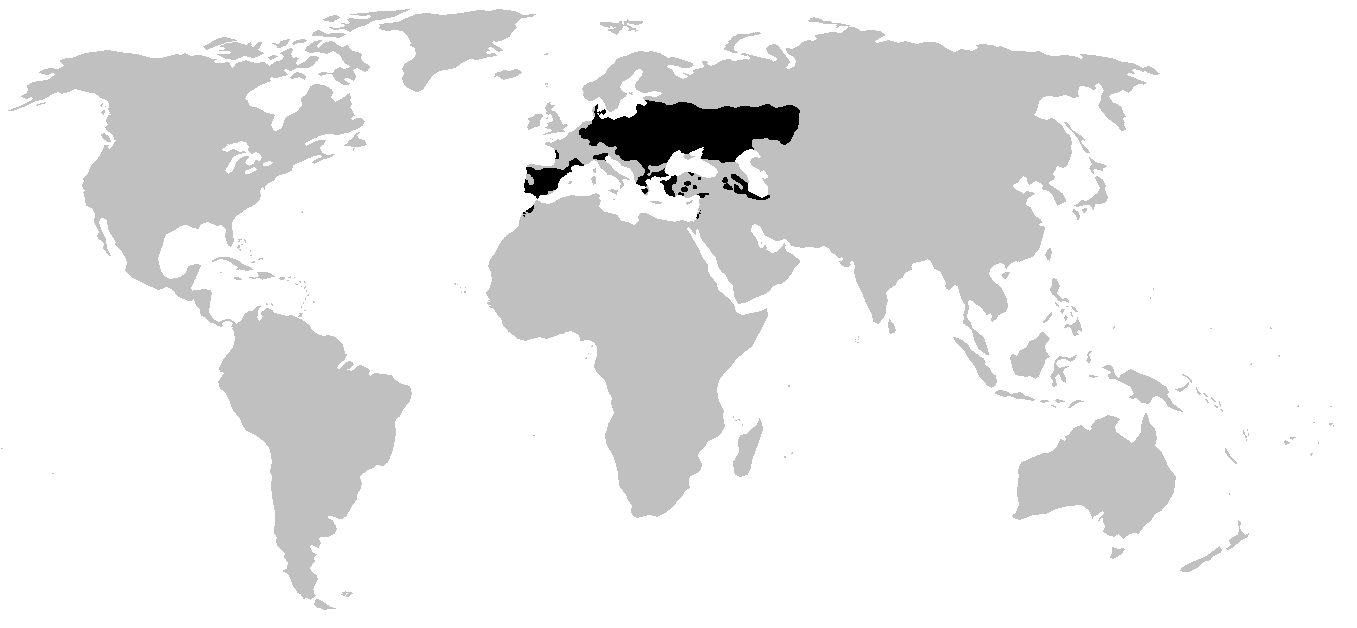
- The distribution of extant pelobatids (in black).

= European spadefoot toad =

European spadefoot toads Temporal range: Late Jurassic – Recent

Family of amphibians

The European spadefoot toads are a family of frogs, the Pelobatidae, with only one extant genus Pelobates, containing six species. They are native to Europe, the Mediterranean, northwestern Africa, and western Asia.

== Description ==
The European spadefoot toad grows up to 10 cm (3.9 in) in length and is often inconspicuously coloured. They have squat bodies with smooth skin and eyes with vertical pupils. They are predominantly fossorial (burrowing) frogs, which dig into sandy soils. Pelobatidae frogs burrow backwards and they spend much of their time in the ground. They prefer open areas with loose soil as opposed to dense compact soil to facilitate the burrowing and have hardened protrusions on their feet to aid in digging, which is the source of the common name. They emerge from the ground during periods of rain and breed in pools, which are usually temporary.

All of the species from this family have free-living, aquatic tadpoles. The eggs are laid in temporary ponds that may quickly evaporate, so the tadpole stage is unusually brief, with rapid development to the adult form in as little as two weeks. To further speed their growth, some of the tadpoles are cannibalistic, eating their brood-mates to increase their supply of protein.

== Taxonomy ==
The seven species of American spadefoot toads (genera Scaphiopus and Spea) were previously also included in the family Pelobatidae, but are now generally regarded as the separate family Scaphiopodidae.

Family Pelobatidae

- Genus †Elkobatrachus
  - †Elkobatrachus brocki
- Genus †Liaobatrachus
- Genus †Eopelobates
  - †Eopelobates anthracinus
  - †Eopelobates bayeri
  - †Eopelobates hinschei
  - †Eopelobates wagneri
- Genus Pelobates
  - Balkan spadefoot (Pelobates balcanicus) Karaman, 1928
  - Western spadefoot toad (Pelobates cultripes) (Cuvier, 1829)
  - Common spadefoot (Pelobates fuscus) (Laurenti, 1768)
  - Eastern spadefoot toad (Pelobates syriacus) Boettger, 1889
  - Moroccan spadefoot toad (Pelobates varaldii) Pasteur & Bons, 1959
  - Pallas' spadefoot toad (Pelobates vespertinus) (Pallas, 1771)

== Fossils ==
The earliest fossil genus of pelobatids, Elkobatrachus, was described in 2006.

In the Jurassic Morrison Formation, pelobatids are represented by the ilium of an unnamed but indeterminate species. This ilium is larger than that of Enneabatrachus, a contemporary discoglossid species. A specimen has been recovered from Quarry 9 of Como Bluff in Wyoming. Pelobatids are present in stratigraphic zones 5 and 6 of the formation.

The Oligocene site of Enspel in Germany preserves evidence of pelobatid tadpoles feeding on pollen.
