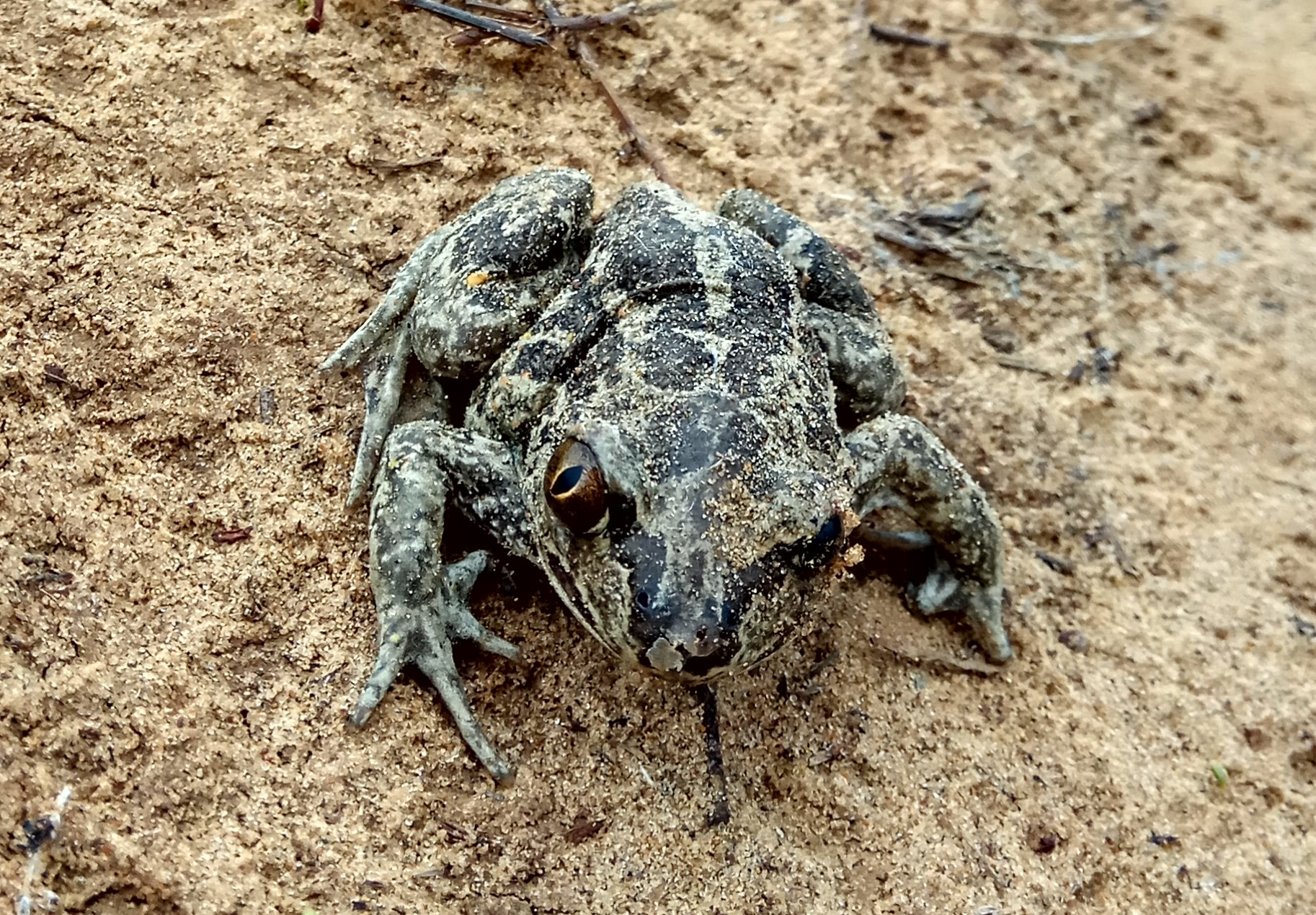
- Pelobates vespertinus

Conservation status
- Least Concern (IUCN 3.1)

Scientific classification
- Kingdom: Animalia
- Phylum: Chordata
- Class: Amphibia
- Order: Anura
- Family: Pelobatidae
- Genus: Pelobates
- Species: P. vespertinus

Binomial name
- Pelobates vespertinus (Pallas, 1771)

Synonyms
- Rana vespertina Pallas, 1771; Bufo vespertinus Schneider, 1799; Pelobates fuscus var. orientalis Severtsov, 1855; Pelobates campestris Severtsov, 1855; Pelobates borkini Zagorodniuk, 2003; Pelobates fuscus vespertinus Pallas, 1771

= Pelobates vespertinus =

Species of amphibian

Pelobates vespertinus, commonly known as Pallas’ spadefoot toad, is a species of toad in the family Pelobatidae. It is native to Eastern Europe and parts of Central Asia, with a broad range extending from eastern Ukraine and southern Russia to western Siberia and northern Kazakhstan. Previously considered a subspecies of Pelobates fuscus, it is now recognized as a distinct species based on morphological, cytogenetic, and genomic evidence.

== Taxonomy ==
Pelobates vespertinus was first described by Peter Simon Pallas in 1771. Although no type specimen was designated, the type locality is inferred to be Zarbay Creek (“Bach Sarbei”) in present-day Samara Oblast, Russia. Since 1872, it was regarded as a subspecies of Pelobates fuscus, the common spadefoot toad. However, studies by Litvinchuk et al. (2013) and Suryadnaya (2014) provided morphological and genetic evidence supporting its species status. These findings were later confirmed and expanded by a comprehensive taxonomic analysis by Dufresnes et al. (2019), which clarified species boundaries within the genus Pelobates and confirmed the distinctiveness of P. vespertinus.

== Description ==
Pallas’ spadefoot is a medium-sized toad, measuring 29–61 mm in length. It has a robust body and a relatively short, rounded snout. Its coloration is typically brownish or grayish with darker markings that vary among individuals. Like other members of its genus, it has a keratinized, spade-like tubercle on each hind foot, which it uses for burrowing. Its eyes are prominent and directed slightly upward, an adaptation to its fossorial and nocturnal lifestyle. Morphologically, it is similar to P. fuscus, but it can usually be distinguished by three pale longitudinal stripes along the dorsum and a dark interocular stripe—features generally absent in P. fuscus.

== Distribution and habitat ==
Pelobates vespertinus occurs across parts of Eastern Europe and Central Asia. Confirmed records include areas of central and southern Russia (e.g., Samara, Kursk, Saratov), northern and eastern Kazakhstan, and northeastern Ukraine. The hybrid zone with P. fuscus is narrow, generally less than 20 km wide, with genetic transitions documented between the Kursk region and southern Ukraine. It typically inhabits open or semi-open lowland environments such as steppes, forest-steppes, river valleys, and floodplains. It prefers loose sandy or loamy soils suitable for burrowing. Breeding occurs in temporary or permanent ponds, ditches, or slow-moving water bodies, often formed after spring rains.

== Ecology and behavior ==
Like other spadefoot toads, P. vespertinus is primarily nocturnal and fossorial, spending most of its life underground. It emerges mainly during the breeding season, which typically begins in spring following significant rainfall. Males call from the water to attract females, and eggs are laid in long gelatinous strings attached to submerged vegetation. Tadpoles develop quickly in temporary water bodies, completing metamorphosis before they dry out. Outside the breeding season, the species feeds on various invertebrates, including insects, earthworms, and other small soil-dwelling animals.

== Conservation status ==
As of 2025, Pelobates vespertinus is listed as Least Concern (LC) on the IUCN Red List, though its population trend is considered decreasing. The species has a wide distribution and remains common in many parts of its range. However, it may be locally threatened by habitat degradation due to agriculture, wetland drainage, and infrastructure development.
