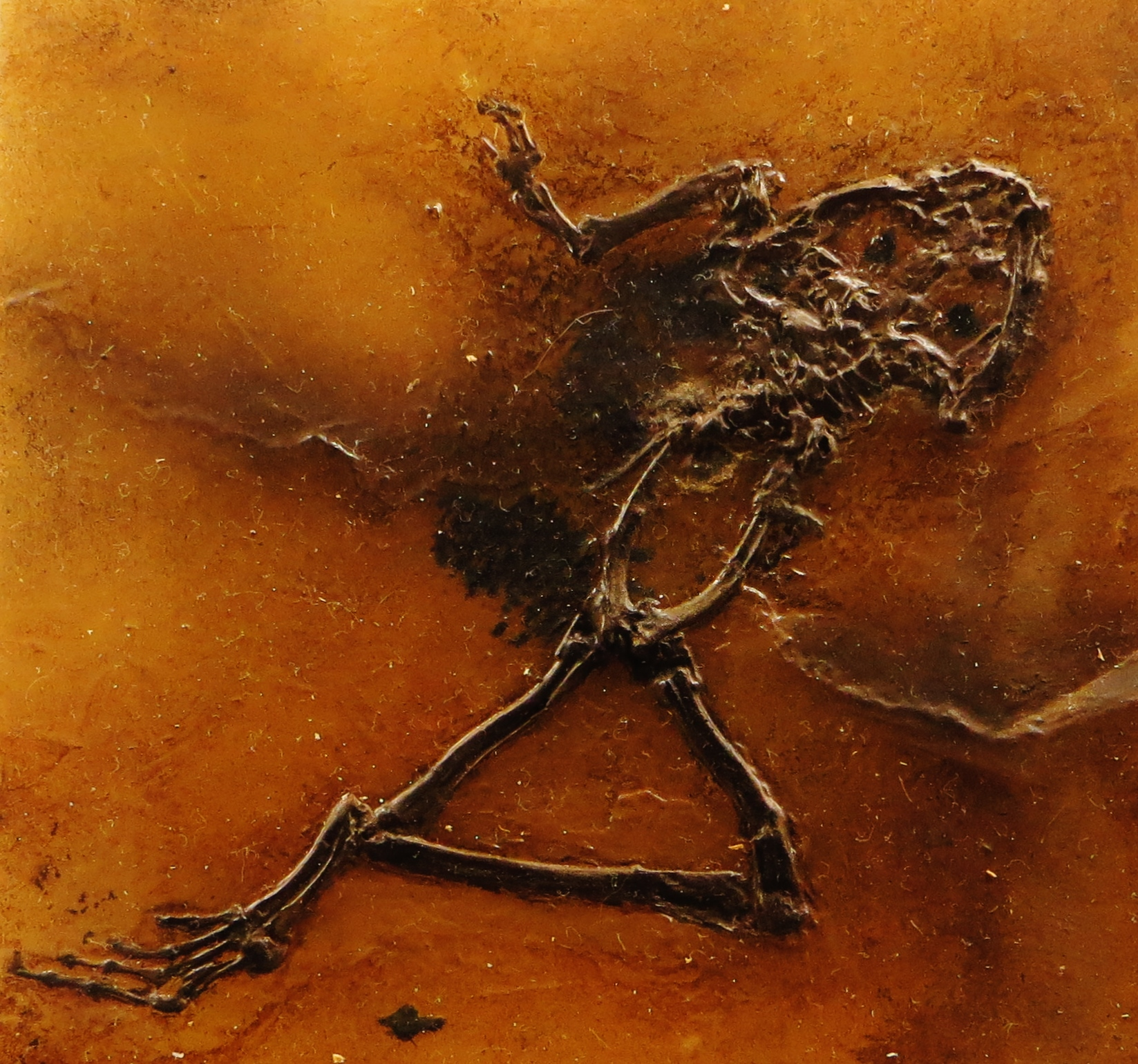
- Eopelobates wagneri

Scientific classification
- Kingdom: Animalia
- Phylum: Chordata
- Class: Amphibia
- Order: Anura
- Family: Pelobatidae
- Genus: †Eopelobates; Parker, 1929

Species
- Eopelobates anthracinus Parker, 1929; Eopelobates bayeri Spinar, 1952; Eopelobates grandis Zweifel, 1956; Eopelobates hiuschei (Kuhn, 1941); Eopelobates wagneri (Weitzel, 1938)

Synonyms
- Propelodytes wagneri Weitzel, 1938

= Eopelobates =

Eopelobates Temporal range: Eocene–Pliocene

Extinct genus of frogs

Eopelobates is an extinct genus of frogs in the family Pelobatidae. Closely related to the living European spadefoot toad, it is known from the Eocene of western North America, and the Eocene–Pliocene of Europe.

== Palaeobiology ==
=== Palaeoecology ===
Biogeochemical analysis of Eopelobates wagneri from the Messel Formation shows that it was a tertiary consumer based on it δ^{15}N values. This is consistent with observed fossil evidence of it feeding on lizards, which have been preserved in the bromalites of this Eopelobates species.

=== Palaeobiogeography ===
It is suggested that the distribution over both Europe and North America is due to dispersal during the Paleocene-Eocene Thermal Maximum.
