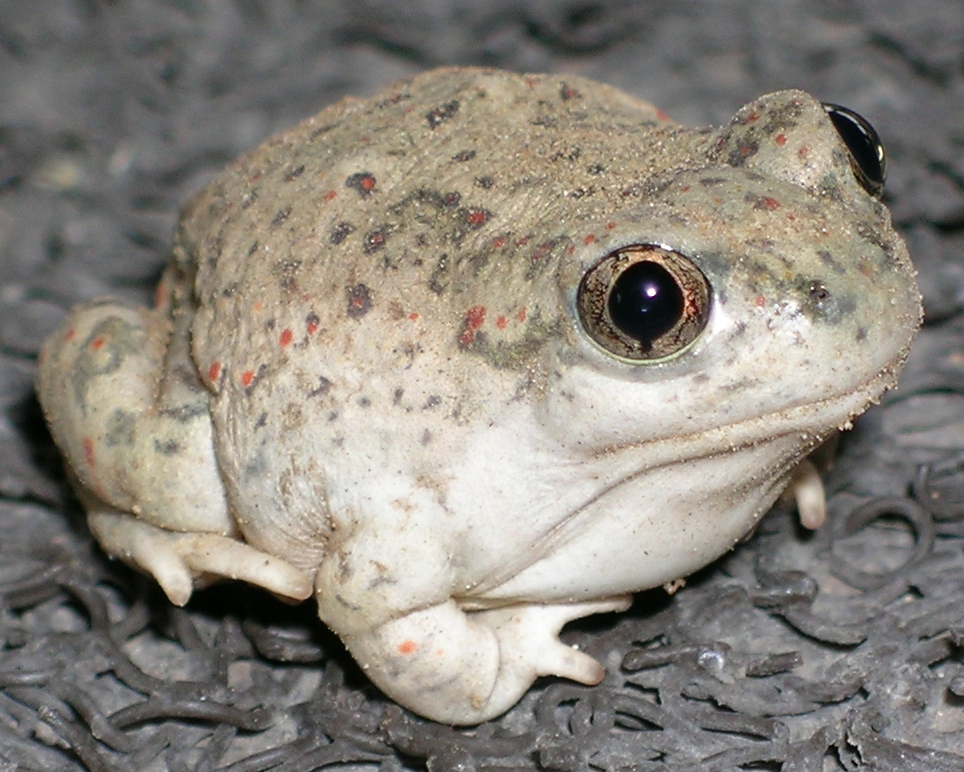

Conservation status
- Least Concern (IUCN 3.1)

Scientific classification
- Kingdom: Animalia
- Phylum: Chordata
- Class: Amphibia
- Order: Anura
- Family: Scaphiopodidae
- Genus: Spea
- Species: S. multiplicata

Binomial name
- Spea multiplicata (Cope, 1863)

Synonyms
- Scaphiopus multiplicatus Cope, 1863; Spea multiplicata Cope, 1866; Spea stagnalis Cope in Yarrow, 1875; Scaphiopus dugesi Brocchi, 1879; Scaphiopus stagnalis Boulenger, 1882; Scaphiopus hammondii multiplicatus Kellogg, 1932; Spea multiplicata Taylor, 1952

= New Mexico spadefoot toad =

Species of amphibian

The New Mexico spadefoot toad (Spea multiplicata) is a species of American spadefoot toad found in the southwestern United States and Mexico. Like other species of spadefoot toad, they get their name from a distinctive spade-like projections on their hind legs, which enable them to dig in sandy soils. Spea multiplicata can be identified by its wedge-shaped spade. Some sources also refer to the species as the Mexican spadefoot toad, desert spadefoot toad or southern spadefoot toad.

== Description ==
The New Mexico spadefoot toad has a length of 1.5 to 2.5 inches (3.8 to 6.4 cm) with a round body and relatively short legs. They weigh between 1.7 and 3.5 ounces (48 and 99 g). They are green, to grey, to brown, usually reflecting the soil color of their native habitat, often with black and orange colored speckling on their back, and a white underside. They have large eyes, with vertical pupils.

== Behavior ==
Like all species of spadefoot toad, the New Mexico spadefoot toad is nocturnal and secretive. If handled, these frogs might emit a peanut-like odor, which can cause tearing and nasal discharge if in close contact with the face. Spending most of its time buried in the ground, the spadefoot emerges during periods of summer rainfall to feed on insects and to breed. Breeding takes place in temporary pools left by the rain. Eggs laid in large masses, often hatch in as little as 48 hours. Females prefer to breed with sympatric males to produce hybrid tadpoles that can develop even faster. The tadpoles are forced to metamorphose quickly, before the water dries up. This process can be as quick as 8 days after hatching.

== Phenotypic plasticity ==
S. multiplicata tadpoles exhibit phenotypic plasticity. In most cases the tadpoles will have an omnivore diet, feeding on detritus and plankton. Tadpoles that ingest fairy shrimp, when present, may express a novel carnivore phenotype. Features of this carnivore phenotype include enlarged jaw muscles and mouthparts that can aid in capturing and consuming prey. This novel phenotype increases the rate of development, helping the tadpoles to escape drying pools more rapidly. Slower and smaller omnivore forms of New Mexico spadefoot tadpoles are more likely to be preyed upon by carnivore morphs of the same species. Scientists have recently produced a draft genome of the New Mexico spadefoot toad. They found that although its genome is on the smaller side compared to most other anurans, there have been several duplications of the key developmental gene nodal, which may be part of the reason spadefoots are able to develop so quickly and show so much phenotypic plasticity.

== Taxonomy ==
The species was once classified as a subspecies of the western spadefoot toad, Spea hammondii, but distinctive morphological characteristics led researchers to reclassify it as its own species. The New Mexico spadefoot toad is also known to hybridize with the Plains spadefoot toad, Spea bombifrons in the areas where their ranges overlap, making distinguishing the species from each other difficult.

== Conservation threats ==
The New Mexico spadefoot toad has been the subject of research related to the possible effects of climate change (specifically changes in rainfall and temperature) on reproduction and development. The impact of water loss at different tadpole stages was studied in the lab in two sets of experiments. Both experiments studied how water loss affected tadpole development, corticosterone levels, spleen size and cellularity, and overall body size. Overall, compared to control tadpoles who experienced no water loss, tadpole groups that experienced steady water loss had a faster rate of metamorphosis, but no consistent differences in corticosterone levels, spleen size or cellularity, or overall body size. This study concluded that while water loss will cause increased rates of development in spadefoot tadpoles, this does not necessarily result in changes in body size in adult spadefoot.

Another potential effect of climate change could be on the spadefoot toad's calling behavior, used by males to attract mates, which is temperature dependent. Researchers examined the relationship between the calling of spadefoot toads and temperature by compiling climate records of temperature and precipitation over a 22-year period. Interestingly, although air temperatures increased over time in the spadefoots' habitat, the water temperature of their breeding ponds has mostly declined, which can be explained by fluctuations in rainfall temperatures. Generally, faster and higher calls by males result in greater reproductive success. Once researchers corrected call rates for temperature, spadefoot call duration decreased while pulse and call rates increased over time. These findings show that climate change does not always have a direct effect on temperature-dependent traits. Instead, it can cause changes in species' microenvironments that can have a greater impact on animal traits.

== Trivia ==
- The New Mexico spadefoot toad was designated as the official State Amphibian of New Mexico in 2003.
