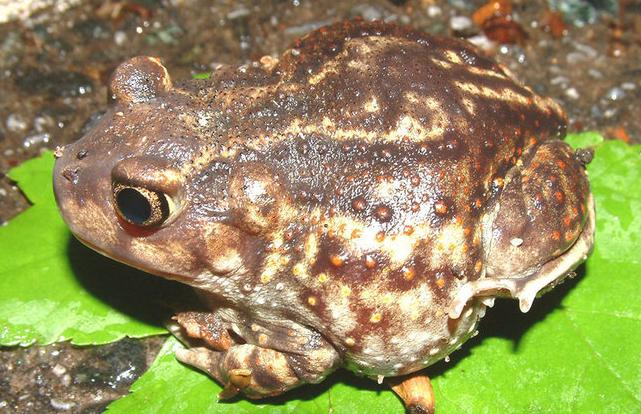

Conservation status
- Least Concern (IUCN 3.1)

Scientific classification
- Kingdom: Animalia
- Phylum: Chordata
- Class: Amphibia
- Order: Anura
- Family: Scaphiopodidae
- Genus: Scaphiopus
- Species: S. holbrookii

Binomial name
- Scaphiopus holbrookii (Harlan, 1835)

Synonyms
- Rana holbrookii Harlan, 1835; Scaphiopus solitarius Holbrook, 1836; Scaphiopus holbrookii – Cope, 1889

= Scaphiopus holbrookii =

Species of amphibian

Scaphiopus holbrookii, commonly known as the eastern spadefoot, is a species of American spadefoot toad (family Scaphiopodidae) endemic to the eastern United States. It is not considered a true toad, with Bufonidae being the family of "true toads".

== Taxonomy ==
The epithet, holbrookii, is in honor of John Edwards Holbrook, American herpetologist. A similar species is Hurter's spadefoot toad, which was once considered a subspecies of S. holbrookii.

Unlike some other spadefoot toad species, such as Spea multiplicata (the Mexican or desert spadefoot) or Spea bombifrons (the plains spadefoot toad), Scaphiopus holbrookii never naturally develop cannibal tadpoles through phenotypic plasticity. Researchers at the University of North Carolina at Chapel Hill believe this is because the eastern spadefoot is most representative of the first spadefoot toads to evolve.

== Distribution and habitat ==
It is mostly found in the southeastern United States, except for mountainous areas, and is also found northward along the Atlantic coast into southern New England, where it is considered rare. It is found in inland states such as Pennsylvania and New York, but only as far westward as the Appalachian Mountains, and the Hudson River Valley in New York. Absent from the Appalachians, but occurs west of them in Tennessee, Kentucky, and southern reaches Illinois, Indiana, and Missouri. They are endangered in Connecticut where it is found that they only have one viable population in the state.

It prefers habitats with loose, commonly sandy, soils for burrowing like longleaf pine forests with open understories from intermittent natural burn events. Most abundant in forests with little leaf litter and sparse shrubs. Research has looked into the habitat selection of the species and has found that it tends to hover around upland areas. It has shown preference for being close to deciduous shrub edges, low-growing pitch pine branches, and reindeer lichen. This environment provides an easy place to burrow, a dense prey biomass, and protection from predators.

== Description ==
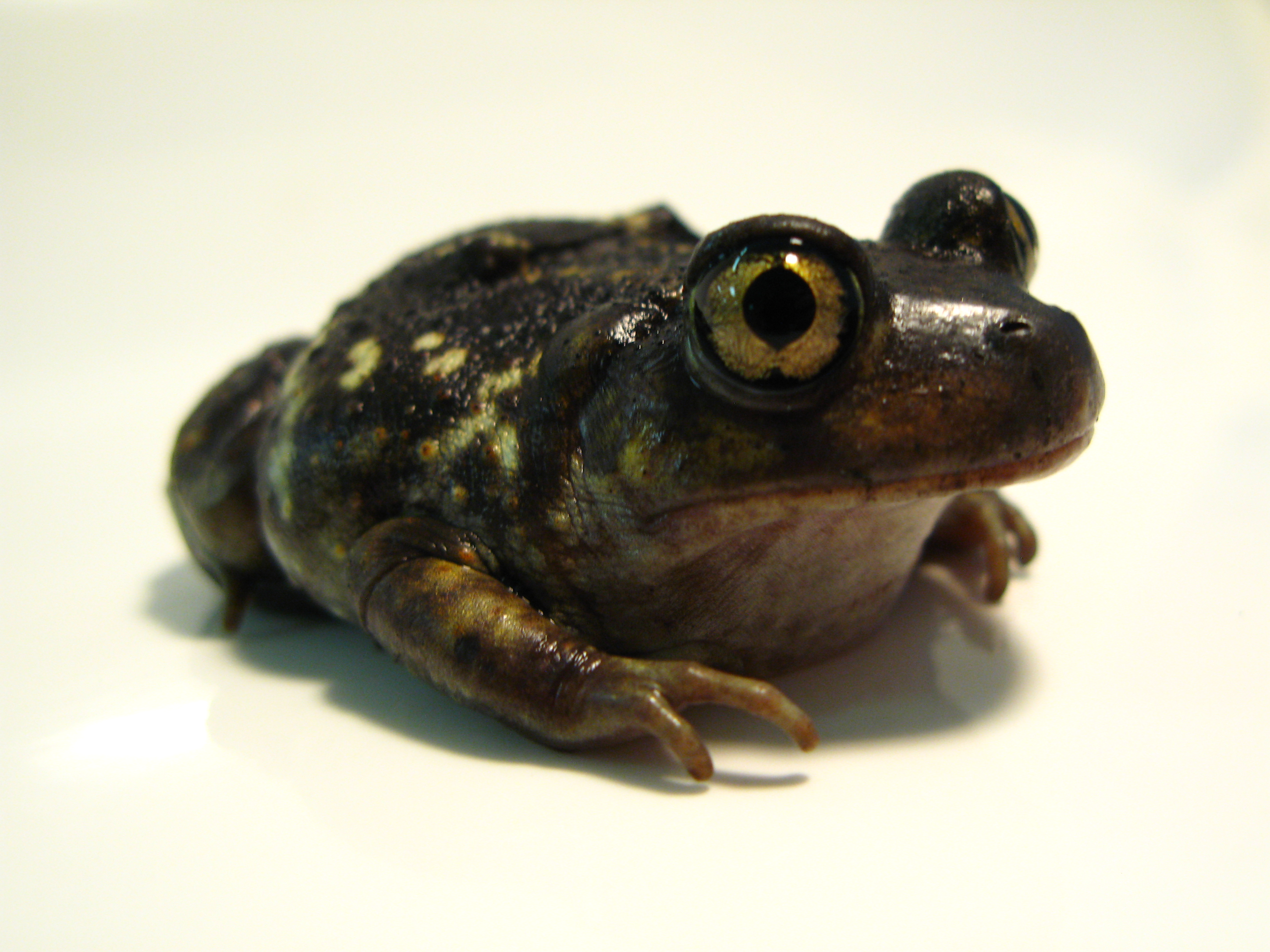
An American eastern spadefoot.

The average length of an adult eastern spadefoot is 44–57 mm (1 3/4–2 1/4 in). It is brownish in color, with two yellowish stripes on its back. These stripes, which begin on the upper eyelids, may diverge or converge, resulting in a pattern resembling a lyre or an hourglass. Some specimens may be very dark, with less distinct markings. The skin is normally smoother and moister than other toads. Their skin is also sparsely peppered with little warts across the entirety of the body. The eastern spadefoot belongs in one of only four groups of burrowing terrestrial anurans. It has one spur on each of its back feet for burrowing. The spur is generally three times longer than the other toes. This spur, along with bright yellow eyes with vertical pupils, are the main distinguishing features of this species.

== Behavior ==
Scaphiopus holbrookii spends almost all of its life deep underground; emerging only to breed or feed. It remains in a type of hibernation almost all its life. It burrows in a spiral. Burrow depth changes in the summer and winter. During the active months, burrow depth averages at 0.4 m. During the winter, burrow depth increases to 0.6 m.

One study used passive integrated transponders (PIT tags) to monitor emergence from burrows. The study found that S. holbrookii emerge about 43% of the nights they were monitored. They are much more likely to emerge if they had emerged the night prior as well. They also tended to emerge more frequently from their burrows on nights that were warmer and more humid, or the night after/during rain. Other than the emergence after rain and during breeding season, these animals do not have a specific pattern to their burrow emergence; the movements seem to be very random.

== Diet and predation ==
Although Scaphiopus holbrookii is both diurnal and nocturnal, most foraging for food sources, consisting of small invertebrates such as termites, insects, arachnids, worms, ants, beetles, and grasshoppers is completed during the day. Some species will completely leave to burrow in search of prey; however, a common tactic for the eastern spadefoot is to simply sit at the opening of the burrow and wait for prey to pass by.

Being burrowing species, spadefoot toads avoid a large amount of predation at the surface, but when exposed during foraging or breeding, they are preyed upon by mammals such as opossums and racoons, birds, and snakes.

== Reproduction ==
S. holbrookii requires fish-free ephemeral ponds for breeding but occupies other habitats such as longleaf pine and wiregrass ecosystems when not breeding. They use inguinal amplexus while mating. Eastern spadefoot toads are explosive breeders during sufficient rainfall and eggs are usually attached to submerged vegetation. Hatching and development rates are highly variable, mediated by ambient air and water temperatures, hatching in as quickly as under 12 hours, but as slowly as over 7 days, and develop into adults in 14–60 days. The eastern spadefoot toad can breed in almost any month of the year. Even though they can breed during any month they do always breed at night to lessen the threat of predation. Due to the explosive breeding, once eggs hatch often food becomes limited from the large populations of tadpoles. S. holbrookii tadpoles are known to be omnivorous. In the event of food shortages some larvae adapt aggressive feeding habits consuming large animal prey including other S. holbrookii tadpoles. These cannibalistic morphs develop at a heightened rate and become much larger tadpoles in comparison to the non-cannibal morphs.

== Conservation status ==
While not listed as an endangered species by the U.S. federal government, S. holbrookii is considered "threatened" in Massachusetts and is listed endangered in Connecticut. In those states and in 13 others, it is listed as a "Species of Greatest Conservation Need".
