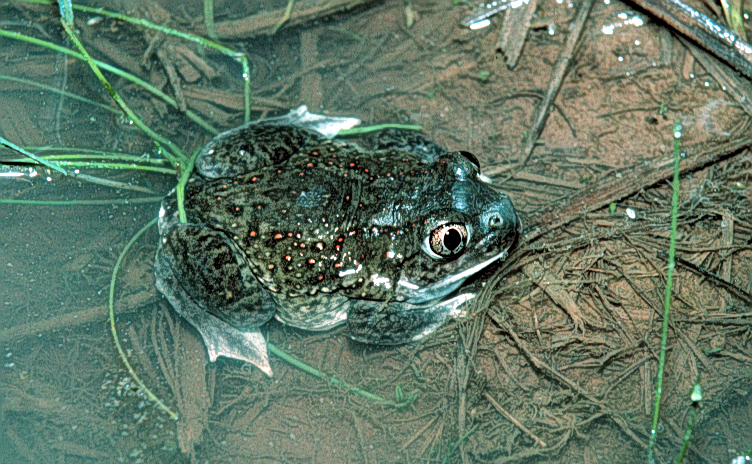

Conservation status
- Least Concern (IUCN 3.1)

Scientific classification
- Kingdom: Animalia
- Phylum: Chordata
- Class: Amphibia
- Order: Anura
- Family: Scaphiopodidae
- Genus: Spea
- Species: S. bombifrons

Binomial name
- Spea bombifrons (Cope, 1863)

Synonyms
- Scaphiopus bombifrons Cope, 1863; Spea bombifrons (Cope, 1866)

= Plains spadefoot toad =

Species of amphibian

The plains spadefoot toad (Spea bombifrons) is a species of American spadefoot toad which ranges from southwestern Canada, throughout the Great Plains of the western United States, and into northern Mexico. Like other species of spadefoot toads, they get their name from a spade-like projection on their hind legs which allows them to dig into sandy soils. Their name, in part, comes from their keratinized metatarsals, which are wide instead of "sickle shaped". The species name translates as buzzing leaf shaped. This refers to the species' distinguishing features; its buzzing mating call, and its leaf-shaped digging metatarsals. It was first described by Cope in 1863.

== Description ==
The plains spadefoot toad generally grows from 1.5 to 2.5 inches (3.8 to 6.4 cm) in length, has a round body, with relatively short legs. These toads are usually a tannish to dark brownish color with visible orange spots. They are one of the easiest anurans to recognize in their region because of their unique appearance. Sometimes, they have light striping on their backs.

== Evolutionary and phylogenic relationships ==
The origins of Lissamphibia are not finalized. This has a lot to do with the fact that early stem amphibians were a lot more like amniotes in terms of biology. Much of amphibian biology appears to be derived evolution. The earliest known fossil of a burrowing frog is likely Prospea holoserisca.

The most basal extant frog species are in the Archeabatrachia suborder. The most primitive frog is arguably Leiopelma.

Salienta fossils are the earliest examples of anurans that show a split from Order Caudata. Examples include Triadobatrachus and Czatkobatrachus.

Because amphibians might actually be highly derived, this could explain why their fossil record is poor. Multilocus sequence typing has proposed a Late Carboniferous/Early Permian origin around 270 mya.

== Geographical distribution and conservation status ==
This species is found throughout the Midwest from Alberta to Mexico wherever there is suitable soil for a fossorial lifestyle. The species is listed by IUCN 2015 as "least concern" and appears to be expanding its range, at least northwards into Alberta, Canada.

== Ecology, behaviour and physiology ==
Spea bombifrons are famous for thriving in xeric environments, but a related species, Scaphiopus holbrookii has similar adaptation but does not live in similar extreme environments. The adults of this species is primarily fossorial for most of the year, but terrestrial during warm, wet periods. It only enters the water for breeding when nocturnal temperatures are at their yearly maximums and within 2–3 days of rain. The tadpoles hatch from eggs after 2 days and metamorphose within 2 weeks. Froglets hide in cracks and shade and live off stored tissue in their tails until they can start feeding as adults.

Toads can only live where the ground is suitable for burrowing, and reproduce within 1 km of where they aestivate. Like all amphibians, they are immobilized by low temperatures. This species prefers to burrow near large objects such as logs or rocks. They like to live near a water source, but this can be a subterranean patch of wet sand.

They have many predators, especially the hognose snake (Heterodon nasicus). Garter snakes predate most tadpoles, but often are not found in the desert, preferring riparian habitats. Many birds are opportunistic predators including burrowing owls and most wading birds. The tadpoles are also predated on by cannibal morphs, dragonfly larvae, giant scavenger beetles, and mosquito fish. Occasionally they will be eaten by Swainson's hawk and burrowing rodents.

There have been a few parasites reported in at least 1 study: Polystoma nearcticum, Aplectana incerta, Aplectana itzocanensis, and Physaloptera spp.

== Behavior ==
Plains spadefoot toads are nocturnal and secretive. They spend most of the dryer seasons buried in the soil in estivation, typically only emerging during spring and fall rains. Breeding takes place in temporary pools of water left by rainfall, which requires the tadpoles to metamorphose quickly, before the water dries up. Eggs, laid in clutches numbering from 10 to 250, often hatch within 48 hours of being laid, and the larvae can change into tadpoles in as little as two weeks. The tadpoles exhibit phenotypic plasticity, with some changing from an omnivorous morphology into a cannibalistic carnivorous morph with oversized jaw muscles and pronged beaks. In some cases, female spadefoot toads will choose to mate with Spea multiplicata rather than with males of their own species, if the resulting hybrid tadpole would have higher chances of survival. Character displacement has also been examined in ponds where Spea bombifrons and Spea multiplicata occur together. Reproductive and ecological competition between the two species likely causes selection for smaller and less reproductively successful individuals of Spea multiplicata.

The adults travel by short hops and are generally poor swimmers. They swim in short bursts and only during periods of reproduction. this species is presumed to be non territorial and solitary except during breeding season. Satellite males have been shown to attempt to intercept females arriving at a breeding pond and are successful in about 20% of cases. Dominant, or first arriving males signal vocally from the deepest part of the ephemeral pool. Amplexus is a necessary stimulus to release eggs. Once the eggs are fertilized, there is little apparent parental care. The adults are strictly live insectivores. The tadpoles are detritivores, either scavengers or herbivores depending on morph.

Tadpole "nests" can be seen in most xeric amphibians, and are well described in the fossil record, such as at the St. George Dinosaur Discovery site. The shallow depressions are a form of "vortex feeding" used to stir up debris for feeding. It is also theorized that the depressions formed could allow a lengthened hydroperiod to increase growth size.

== Sensory modalities ==
Both tadpoles and adults have many senses. Studies support a theory that olfactory sense is important to tadpoles of this species. Adult breeding frogs detect breeding ponds by using auditory cues from other frog calls to gauge distance, size of pool, likelihood of predators and numbers as well as breeding condition of other frogs. Sources say frogs use low frequency sound of rain as a cue to emerge from aestivation. While olfactory cues are considered a secondary emergence stimulus, there is evidence in other anurans that the smell of emergent plant growth can also guide frogs to breeding sites, specifically pond weed species. Persistent emergent behaviour has been observed personally when a piece of moss was placed in an enclosure of two captive Spea bombifrons.

Anuran tadpoles almost always have evidence of neuromasts arranged in lateral lines, although these only exist in adults of fully aquatic species, of which there are surprisingly few. There is poor research on how tadpoles use this sensory input during development.

Frog hearing is unique in that the lungs act as amplifiers for the hearing. Their columella-operculum complex has been theorized as a method they can use to detect earthquakes.

Frogs have a unique form of green rods in their retinas which is theorized to help them see at very low light levels.

== Physiology ==
Frogs in general, but fossorial frogs specifically are able to absorb water through a "seat patch" instead of drinking. The skin is selectively permeable via aquaporins, allowing them to absorb water from damp ground, standing water, and mossy substrates.

According to David Pfenning's lab at the University of North Carolina, Desert spadefoots appear able to not only adapt their bodies to a carnivorous diet (Shorter gut, protein-digesting genes are activated) but also are more likely to have progeny that are adapted to meat. This is a major study that shows that Lamarckian characteristics are not as disproven as once thought.

Both Spea species found in North America have been used for many years in the North Carolina lab of Karin Pfennig as model organisms to study hybridization and its effects on competition and evolution. The results appear to be mixed, but there is evidence of resource competition being linked to species divergence.
