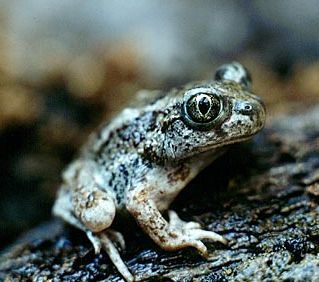

Conservation status
- Least Concern (IUCN 3.1)

Scientific classification
- Kingdom: Animalia
- Phylum: Chordata
- Class: Amphibia
- Order: Anura
- Family: Scaphiopodidae
- Genus: Spea
- Species: S. intermontana

Binomial name
- Spea intermontana (Cope, 1883)

Synonyms
- Scaphiopus intermontanus Cope, 1883; Scaphiopus hammondi subsp. intermontanus Cope, 1883; Spea hammondii subsp. intermontana (Cope, 1883)

= Great Basin spadefoot =

Species of amphibian

The Great Basin spadefoot (Spea intermontana) is an amphibian in the family Scaphiopodidae. It is 3.8 to 6.3 centimetres (1.5 to 2.5 in) long and is usually colored gray, olive or brown. Great Basin spadefoot toads have adapted to life in dry habitats. They use the hard, keratinized spade on each foot to dig a burrow, where they spend long periods during cold and dry weather. They are opportunistic hunters and will eat anything they can subdue. While their tadpoles have numerous predators, adults are able to produce skin secretions that deter enemies.

== Identification ==
The Great Basin spadefoot ranges from 3.8 to 6.3 centimetres (1.5 to 2.5 in) long. It is usually gray, olive or brown colored. Gray streaks outline an hourglass-shaped marking on the back. The skin is smooth compared with the bumpy skin of the true toads in the genus Bufo. There is a spade present on the inside of each hind foot; it has sharp edges and is wedge-shaped. A glandular boss is present between the eyes. Eyes are catlike; pupils are vertical in bright light and round at night. Dark brown spots are present on each upper eyelid.

== Habitat and distribution ==
The natural habitats of the Great Basin spadefoot include pinyon-juniper, ponderosa pine, and high elevation (up to 2,600 metres or 8,500 feet) spruce-fir forests, semidesert shrubland, sagebrush flats, temperate grasslands, and deserts. They are present in agricultural areas as well. The Great Basin Spadefoot can be found from southern British Columbia through the eastern portions of Washington and Oregon and in southern Idaho. Their range extends throughout all of Nevada and into most of Utah; they are also present in small areas in California, Arizona, Colorado, and Wyoming.

== Reproduction ==
=== Breeding ===
Breeding is explosive, meaning that large congregations of individuals assemble and mate with each other. Adults are terrestrial and must migrate to breeding sites. Breeding may take place in permanent or temporary water sources such as springs, sluggish streams, and manmade reservoirs during the months of April through July. Spring rains usually provide the stimulus for males to emerge from their burrows for breeding, although unlike other spadefoots (Scaphiopus spp.), Great Basin spadefoots do breed during periods of no rainfall. The stimulus for breeding in the absence of rain is unknown. Males move to breeding waters first and begin vocalizing. Once females arrive, there is a race to mate with as many others as possible, and physical contests between males are common.

Females usually lay 300–500 eggs contained in a sticky gel, but have been reported lay as many as 1000 eggs in captivity. The female deposits her fertilized eggs in several different locations within the breeding water: on vegetation, rocks, bottom of the pool, or anything else that anchors the eggs. After mating, females return to their burrows. Males stay at the breeding pool and continue vocalizing until females stop arriving (presumably because all females in the vicinity have mated); then the males also return to their burrows.

=== Development ===
Eggs hatch in 2 to 4 days, and the tadpole development and metamorphosis is complete within 4 to 8 weeks, depending upon temperature, food quality, and food quantity. Developing rapidly helps Great Basin spadefoots avoid desiccation and consequent death in their arid environment.

Young morphs (metamorphosed preadults) are small, about 0.8 inch (19 mm) in length on average. They have high surface-to-volume ratios; therefore, they are highly susceptible to desiccation and seek shade cover immediately after emerging from breeding pools. They grow, by about 110% in length and 1,100% in mass over 3 months under laboratory conditions. Tadpoles may be carnivorous or herbivorous, depending on environmental conditions. Different larval diets are associated with different morphological characteristics.

== Behavior ==
=== Diet ===
Adult spadefoots are opportunistic carnivores. Adults have been shown to eat arthropods from the taxa Coleoptera, Diptera, Hemiptera, Hymenoptera, Lepidoptera, Neuroptera, Orthoptera, Trichoptera, Collembola, and Araneae. Ants and beetles are their most common prey. Feeding seems to be generalized and opportunistic; the toads will eat anything they can subdue.

Adults hunt in spring and summer, but only at night or during light rains. Spadefoot tadpoles are dimorphic. Within a cohort, some tadpoles have large mouthparts, while others have much smaller mouthparts. As well as consuming other types of food, large-mouthed individuals are cannibalistic, swallowing other tadpoles whole.

=== Defense mechanisms ===
Reported predators of adult Great Basin spadefoot toads include rattlesnakes, coyotes, and owls. Predators of larva include mud turtles (Kinosternon flavescens), spotted skunks (Spilogale putarius), raccoons (Procyon lotor), common crows (Corvus brachyrhynchos) and snakes. Adults are able to produce skin secretions that cause allergic reactions in some humans, including a burning sensation if the secretion gets in the eyes or nose. The skin secretions also deter predators.

=== Burrowing behavior ===
Great Basin spadefoot toads have adapted to life in dry habitats. Desiccation is avoided by this terrestrial amphibian through burrowing into the ground. The toad use the hard, keratinized spade on each foot to dig a burrow, where it spends long periods during cold and dry weather. The toad is able to absorb water from the surrounding soil; even as the soil becomes increasingly dry in spring and early summer months, increased concentrations of urea in the toad's body allow it to continue to suck water out of the soil through osmosis. When the summer rains arrive the Great Basin spadefoot emerges from its burrow.

Morphs and adult Great Basin spadefoots normally venture from their burrows at night, when it is rainy or the night air is humid enough for dew to collect. Captive spadefoots have been observed to dig shallow burrows in moist soil, then dig deeper (2 to 3 feet [0.7–1.2 m]) as soil dries at the surface. Spadefoots have been found 15 feet (4.6 m) underground in natural conditions. An individual spadefoot digs and occupies only one burrow, which it usually returns to after foraging or mating. Spadefoots do not use shrubs or other vegetation for cover while foraging.

Spadefoots accumulate fat rapidly in summer. They are dormant in fall and winter, with dormancy apparently triggered by photoperiod. Spring emergence may be triggered by increased moisture in the burrow. Spadefoots extend their dormancy period during drought, and can apparently remain dormant or mostly dormant for long periods of time. Fat reserves are metabolized slowly during dormancy, and females may reabsorb their eggs if spring rains do not occur.
