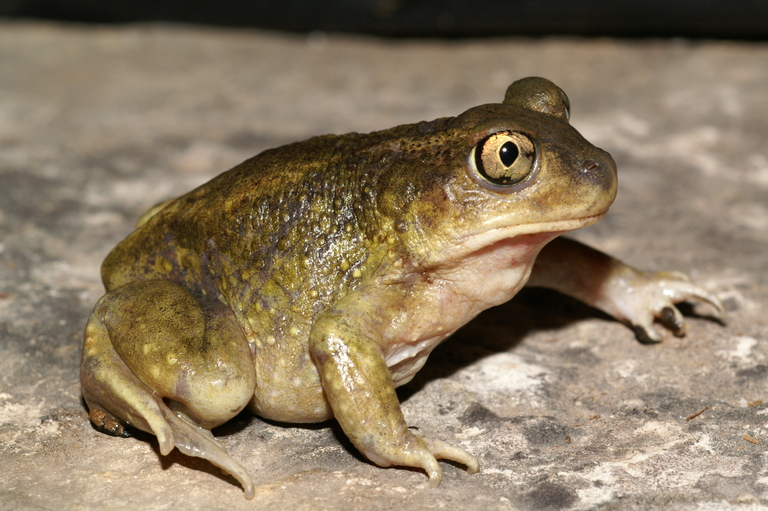

Conservation status
- Least Concern (IUCN 3.1)

Scientific classification
- Kingdom: Animalia
- Phylum: Chordata
- Class: Amphibia
- Order: Anura
- Family: Scaphiopodidae
- Genus: Scaphiopus
- Species: S. hurterii

Binomial name
- Scaphiopus hurterii Strecker, 1910

= Hurter's spadefoot toad =

Species of amphibian

Hurter's spadefoot toad or Hurter's spadefoot (Scaphiopus hurterii) is a species of American spadefoot toad (family Scaphiopodidae) found in the south central United States (Texas, Louisiana, Arkansas, Oklahoma); its range might extend to the adjacent northern Mexico. It was once classified as a subspecies of the eastern spadefoot toad (Scaphiopus holbrookii), but it has been granted its own species status. The specific name hurterii is in honor of the Swiss-American naturalist and curator of the St. Louis Academy of Sciences, Julius Hurter.

== Habitat ==
The species occurs in areas of sandy, gravelly, or soft, light soils in wooded or unwooded terrain and in sandy open woodland and savanna as well as in mesquite scrub. During periods of inactivity it burrows underground. Breeding takes place in temporary pools formed by heavy rains.
