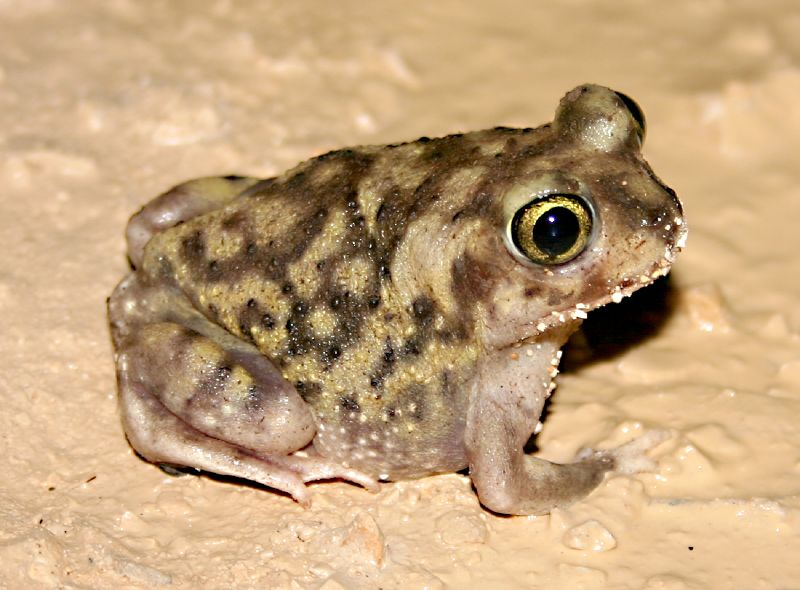
- Couch's spadefoot toad, Scaphiopus couchii

Scientific classification
- Kingdom: Animalia
- Phylum: Chordata
- Class: Amphibia
- Order: Anura
- Family: Scaphiopodidae
- Genus: Scaphiopus; Holbrook, 1836

= Scaphiopus =

Genus of amphibians

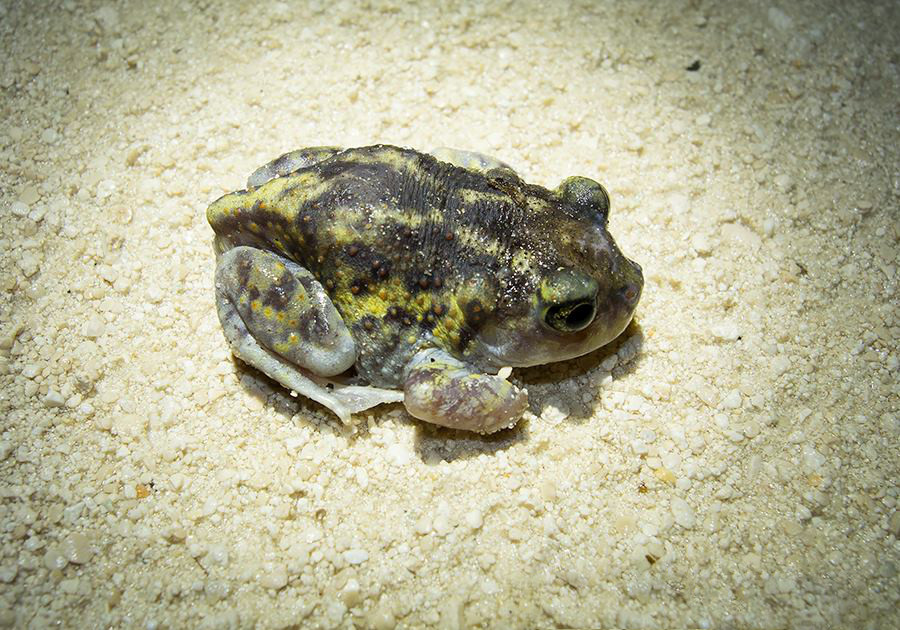
Southern Spadefoot toad, Florida-adult

Scaphiopus is a genus of North American amphibian commonly referred to as the North American spadefoots, southern spadefoots, or eastern spadefoot toads. They differ greatly from true toads (those of the family Bufonidae) by having eyes with vertical pupils, no parotoid gland, and relatively smooth skin. Their most distinctive feature is a spade-like projection on their hind feet, from which their common name is derived. This projection enables spadefoot toads to dig in loose soils with ease. Its scientific name means ‘spade-foot’ as well, from the Ancient Greek skaphís (σκαφίς, ‘spade, shovel’) and pous (πούς, ‘foot, leg’).

== Species ==
Scaphiopus species were once classified with their European cousins in the family Pelobatidae, but have since been reclassified to their own family, Scaphiopodidae, with other North American species. There are three species in the genus Scaphiopus:

- Couch's spadefoot, Scaphiopus couchii Baird, 1854
- Eastern spadefoot, Scaphiopus holbrookii (Harlan, 1835)
- Hurter's spadefoot, Scaphiopus hurterii Strecker, 1910

== Geographic range ==
Spadefoot toads are found throughout the United States and into northern Mexico. They tend to prefer dry, grassland areas with loose, sandy soils that flood in the rainy season.

== Description ==
Scaphiopus are generally colored appropriately with greens and browns to camouflage themselves in their native habitat. At adult size they are usually not much larger than 8 cm.

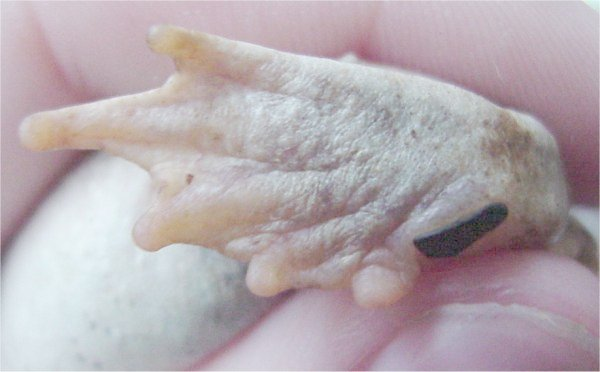
Rear foot of a Couch's spadefoot, Scaphiopus couchii demonstrating the "spade" that gives them their name

== Behavior and reproduction ==
Adult Spadefoot toads are nocturnal and spend most of their day burrowed underground. At night they will regularly emerge to forage. Spadefoot toads are explosive breeders; after periods of heavy rainfall breeding adults will scramble to fishless, ephemeral pools to breed and lay eggs. They have one of the fastest reproductive cycles of any amphibian species. Once laid, eggs hatch in a matter of a day or two. The tadpoles are capable of developing to froglets within a couple of weeks. This short larval period allows spadefoots to utilize water sources that other amphibians cannot.

== Diet ==
Their diet primarily consists of Lepidopterous larvae, Scarabaeidae adults, and Carabidae adults, which suggests that they forage on the surface rather than underground.
