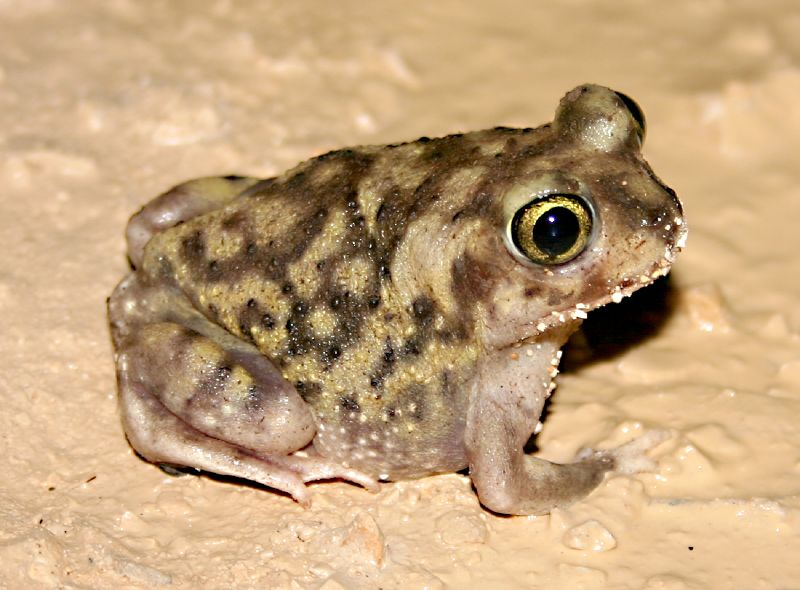

Conservation status
- Least Concern (IUCN 3.1)

Scientific classification
- Kingdom: Animalia
- Phylum: Chordata
- Class: Amphibia
- Order: Anura
- Family: Scaphiopodidae
- Genus: Scaphiopus
- Species: S. couchii

Binomial name
- Scaphiopus couchii Baird, 1854

= Couch's spadefoot toad =

Species of amphibian

The call of Couch's spadefoot toad

Couch's spadefoot toad or Couch's spadefoot (Scaphiopus couchii) is a species of North American spadefoot toad (family Scaphiopodidae). The specific epithet couchii is in honor of American naturalist Darius Nash Couch, who collected the first specimen while on a personal expedition to northern Mexico to collect plant, mineral, and animal specimens for the Smithsonian Institution.

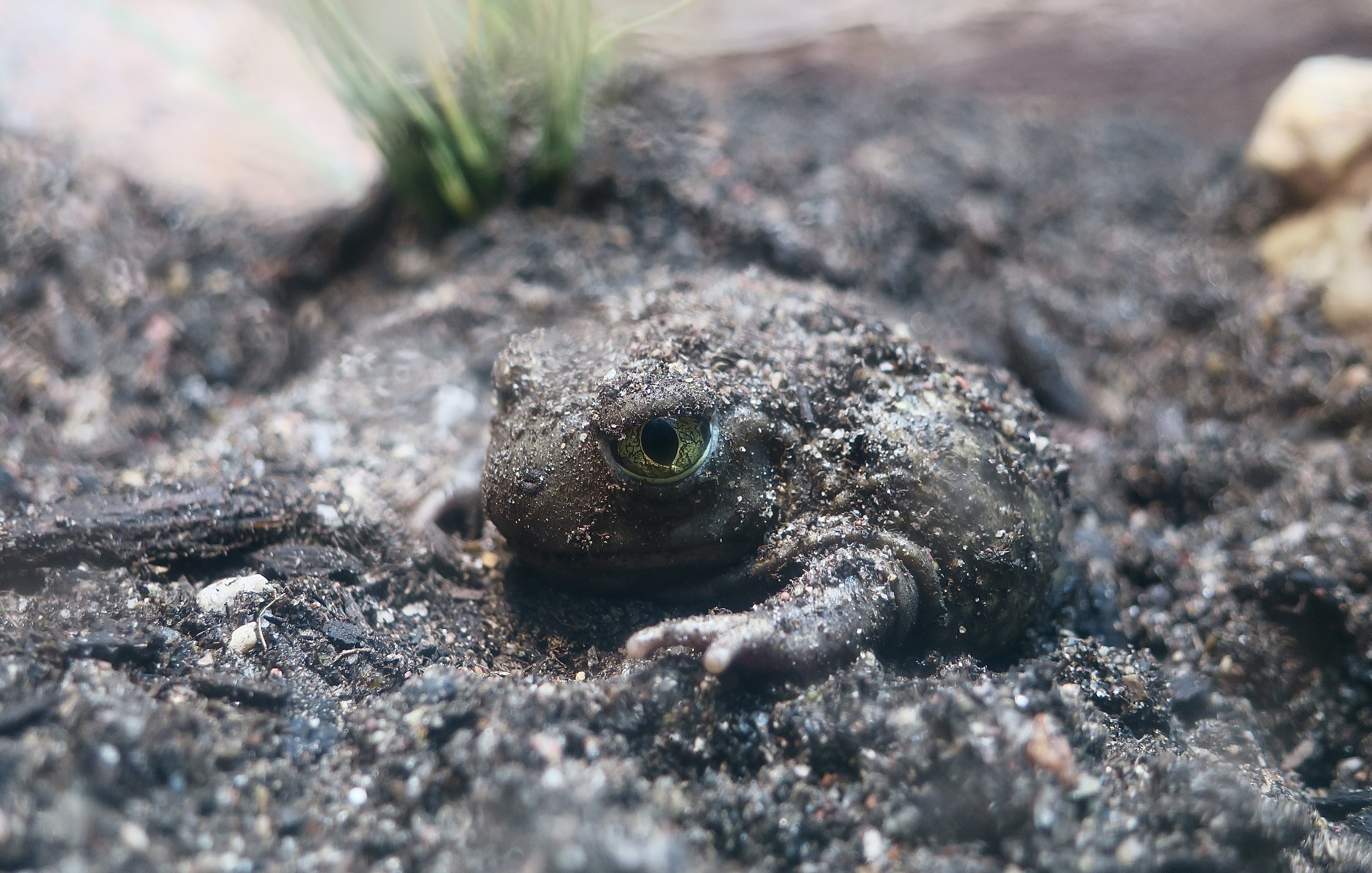
A Couch's spadefoot at Phoenix Zoo.

== Description ==
Unlike other toads which have horizontal pupils, spadefoot toads have vertical pupils. On the underside of the hind foot is a hard, dark "spade" that gives spadefoot toads their name. The length of this spadefoot ranges from 5.5 to 9 cm (2.2 to 3.5 in), and body color being yellow to yellow-green, with darker mottling. These "spades" are used by the toads to burrow into the ground to prevent water loss and hide from predators. There are two spadefoot species in the Sonoran Desert of Arizona and California. Couch's spadefoot toad (Scaphiopus couchi) has a sickle-shaped "spade", whereas the western spadefoot toad (Spea hammondii) has a rounded "spade". Contrary to the name, spadefoots are not true toads

== Distribution ==
Couch's spadefoot is native to the United States southwest of southeastern Colorado and central Oklahoma, northern Mexico and the Baja peninsula. They can be found throughout the Sonoran Desert, which includes parts of southern Arizona and California.

== Mating and reproduction ==
Water is a necessary medium for the fertilization of spadefoot eggs, and once the eggs hatch, water also provides a place for tadpoles to mature to the adult stage. Because of the importance of water, spadefoots are active during the wet season spring and summer in the Northern Hemisphere, and remain in a watertight cocoon underground during the dry season (fall and winter). When a summer thunderstorm arrives, the male toads emerge from underground and look for pools of rainwater. When they find water, the males produce a mating call that attracts female toads. New research has shown that females tend to be more attracted to bright-colored males over their dark-colored peers. Thus creating a new aspect in their determination of the male's size and condition. Because the pools of water may be short-lived, mating occurs the first night after rainfall begins.

During reproduction, the male mounts the female and releases sperm to fertilize the eggs, which are deposited in the pools of water in the form of a floating mass. The eggs hatch into tadpoles, which quickly mature into adults. They must reach this stage before the pool of water evaporates, and thus they sometimes mature in as little as 9 days after the eggs are laid. Western spadefoot toads take longer to mature (at least three weeks).

The small pools of water are warmed by the sun, which speeds up the growth of the tadpoles. Tadpoles will eat a variety of foods, such as small insects near the pool and algae, which they scrape off rocks. They also filter microorganisms from the water as it is passed over their gills. Tadpoles gather in wriggling masses, stir up the muck on the bottom of the pool, and filter out the organic nutrients. Unlike most tadpoles, which are exclusively herbivores and filter feeders, spadefoot tadpoles are omnivores. They also eat dead insects and tadpoles, as well as fairy shrimp.
