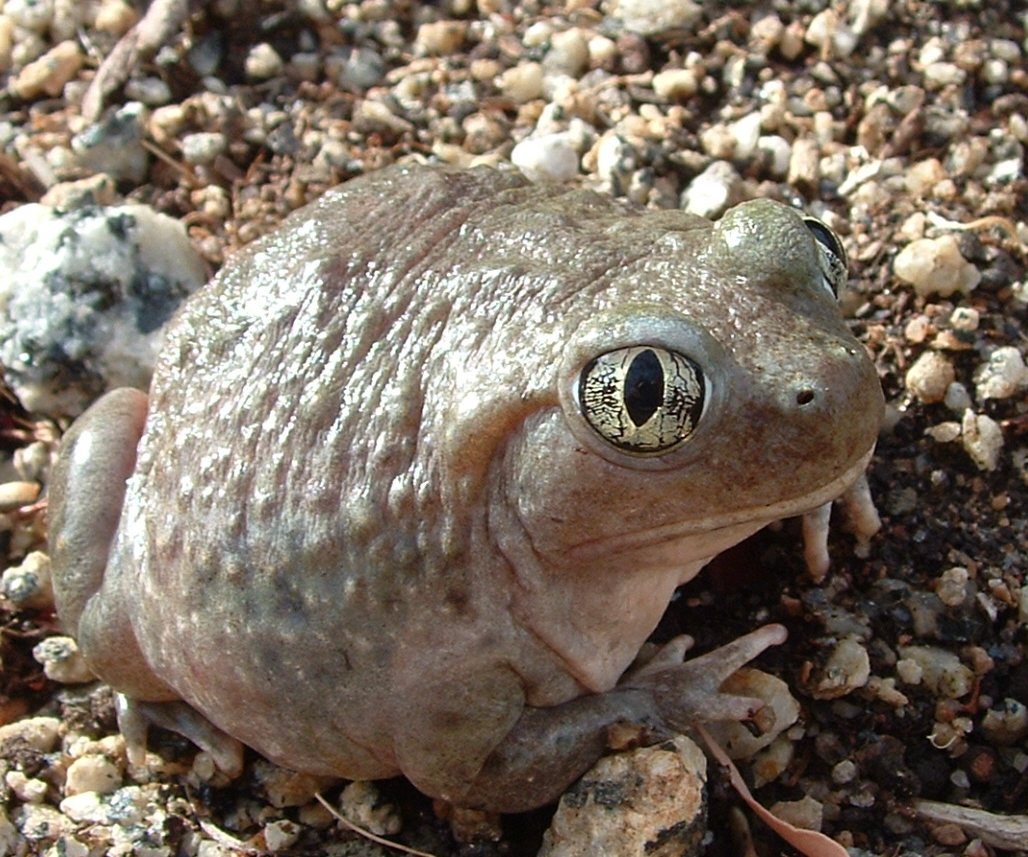
- Western spadefoot toad (Spea hammondii)

Scientific classification
- Kingdom: Animalia
- Phylum: Chordata
- Class: Amphibia
- Order: Anura
- Suborder: Mesobatrachia
- Family: Scaphiopodidae; Cope, 1865

Genera
- Scaphiopus; Spea †Prospea
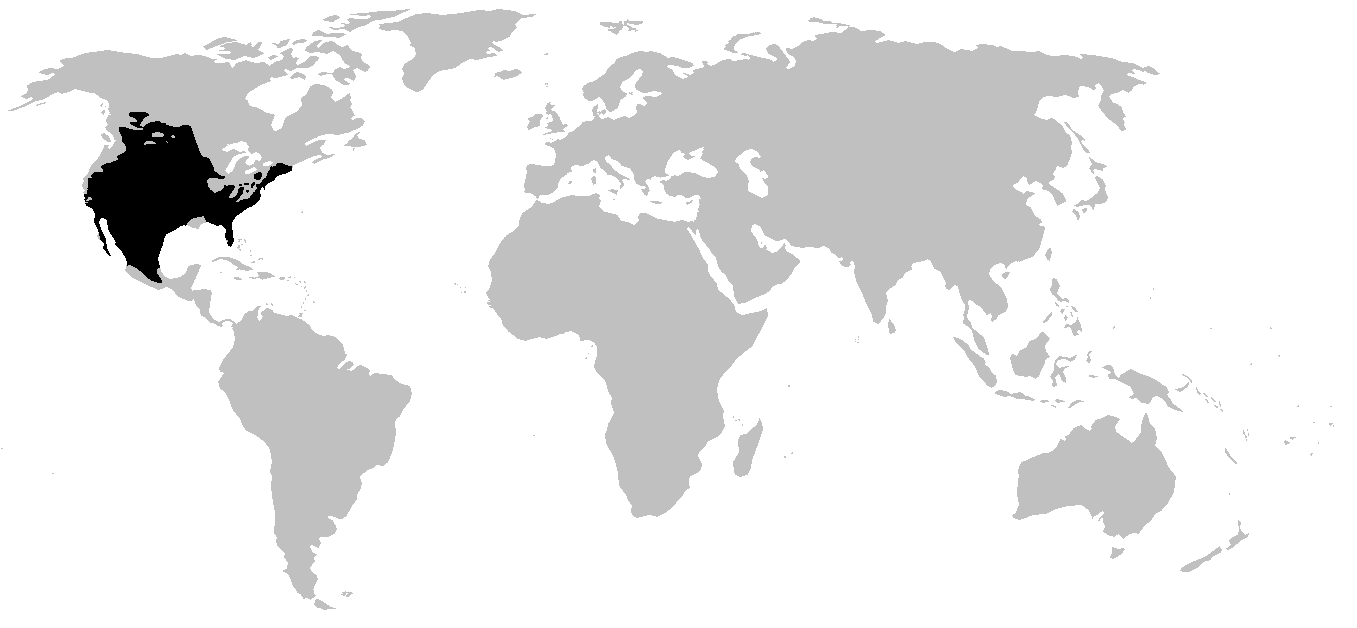
- Distribution of Scaphiopodidae (in black)

= American spadefoot toad =

American spadefoot toad Temporal range: Paleocene to recent, 58.7–0 Ma

Family of amphibians

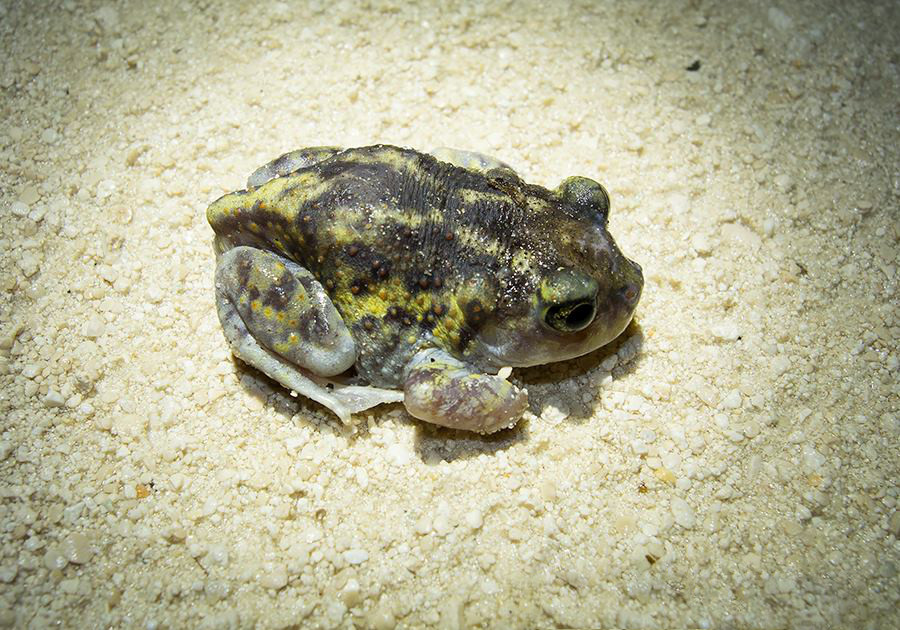
Southern spadefoot toad, Florida-adult

The Scaphiopodidae are a family of American spadefoot toads, which are native to North America. The family is small, comprising only eleven different species.

The American spadefoot toads are of typical shape to most fossorial (or burrowing) frogs. They are round, with short legs and protruding eyes. As suggested by their name, these frogs have hard, keratinous protrusions present on their feet, which help them to dig. Like most fossorial frogs, they dig backwards into the ground. They differ from true toads because they have vertical pupils and no parotoid gland.

The American spadefoot toads are terrestrial when not underground. They are dully colored, usually a grey or dull green or brown, to aid in camouflage in their arid habitats.

== Taxonomy ==
The American spadefoot toads were previously included in a broader circumscription of the family Pelobatidae, which then united Palaearctic and Neoarctic spadefoot toads in the same family. However, the American spadefoot genera were split off into Scaphiopodidae, with the Pelobatidae restricted to the European spadefoot toads in the genus Pelobates.

The Scaphiopodidae contains two genera, both in North America:

- Southern spadefoot toads, Scaphiopus (Holbrook, 1836)
- Western spadefoot toads, Spea (Cope, 1866)

Despite the common name and current distribution of the family, fossil evidence indicates that it once had a much larger distribution that at least reached eastern Asia. The extinct genus †Prospea is the earliest known member of this family, and is only known from Paleocene sediments in Mongolia.

== Appearance ==
Similar to other burrowing frogs, American spadefoot toads are about 2-3 inches in length with round, stocky bodies and eyes that bulge from their heads. The name "spadefoot" is derived from the keratinous bone in its hind legs that allow it to burrow within soil. The skin of the toad is grey or brown in appearance and smooth to the touch.

== Location and environment ==
Spadefoot toads are generally found in arid climates, where they spend the majority of their lives underground, generally beneath perennial ponds, creek beds, or other moisture-retaining areas. During years of sufficient rainfall, the toads surface to breed and lay eggs.

Spadefoot toads stay hidden underground in a low energy state, and are awakened by low frequency sounds of thunder. They then dig their way to the surface. After a thunderstorm, a previously silent dry area may start to sound like a marshy swamp, as the toads quickly seek mates in the short time available before desert puddles dry up. Tadpoles rapidly mature into toads and must bury themselves before desert conditions revert to normal.

The species of spadefoot toads are found in different locations across North America. The eastern spadefoot is the only species found east of the Mississippi River, ranging from New England to southern Florida. The Great Basin spadefoot and the plains spadefoot are both found in Western Canada and the northwestern U.S., but the plains spadefoot has also spread into Texas and northern Mexico. Couch's spadefoot, Hurter's spadefoot, and the New Mexico spadefoot are all spread across the Southern and Southwestern U.S., with Couch's and Hurter's also reaching into Mexico. The western spadefoot is found in California, mainly southern parts of the state and extending into Baja California, Mexico.

The toads are believed to have moved into North America from South American countries due to a changing climate. They most likely moved into the U.S. as a single species, but split up as they spread across the continent and adapted to their new surroundings. The toads prefer marsh-like environments, but only enter the water to breed. They stay buried in the soil for most of the year as a mechanism to deal with changing weather.

== Diet ==
American spadefoot toads have a unique diet. The adults' and tadpoles' diets vary. The adults' diet consists of invertebrates. They eat flies, crickets, caterpillars, moths, spiders, centipedes, millipedes, earthworms, and snails. The tadpoles' diet is related to its surroundings and food supply. When they are first hatched, they eat plankton. After a few days, they become carnivorous and eat animals. Tadpoles sometimes resort to cannibalism to survive. After multiple experiments, Paul Székely, Marian Tudor, and Dan Cogalniceanu concluded that tadpole development is influenced by hydroperiod, or the period in which an area is full of water. Since American spadefoot toads breed in shallow waters, they are under "constant stress from drying waters, increasing temperatures, reduced food densities, and crowding". This stress, or simply a lack of adequate food, can increase the likelihood of cannibalism. If they do resort to cannibalism, their bodies can transform. They "develop larger heads, sharp beaks, stronger jaw muscles, and shortened intestine". Researchers have concluded that this is an adaptive trait because it accelerates the rate of growth of the tadpoles by allowing for an increased caloric intake.

== Conservation efforts ==
The eastern spadefoot was placed on the endangered list of Pennsylvania in 2005 (though also endangered in: Ohio, Connecticut, and Rhode Island), when living populations were only found in two of their known locations. One possibility for their low population size could be that breeding pools and ponds "often dry up before the tadpoles get to complete metamorphosis"(Naish, 2015)

So far, conservation efforts have affected the prevention of the species habitat loss. In 2012, a couple learned that 32 acres of a property they planned to subdivide and break ground on could potentially be spadefoot habitat. So as per a species action plan put forth by Berks County conservancy and its partners, the couple would now need to seek state approval, and "hire someone familiar with the eastern spadefoot toad to survey the tract for signs of its habitat". The Natural Diversity Section of the State of Pennsylvania published a 2011 species action plan for the Eastern Spadefoot toad. This plan identifies the following counties for populations: Adams, Berks, Bucks, Centre, Cumberland, Franklin, Lehigh, Northampton, Northumberland, Union, and York.

As per conservation efforts, the awareness of citizens to the endangerment of spadefoot toads in their regions has been a success.

In 2004, the western spadefoot toad was the only member of the family Scaphiopodidae to be classified as near threatened by the ICUN Red List. All other species, including the eastern spadefoot, were listed as least concern. Presently, all species' conservation status require reviewing.

== Species ==
Name	Biological name	Description	Images
Couch's spadefoot toad	Scaphiopus couchii	Couch's spadefoot toads are found in the southwestern regions of the United States and some regions of Mexico. They stay buried in the soil for 8–10 months a year and eat enough in one meal to last them a whole year. Couch's spadefoot toads' tadpoles transform into frogs in 7–8 days	
Eastern spadefoot toad	Scaphiopus holbrookii	Eastern spadefoot toads are found all along the East Coast of United States, from southern New England to Florida. They are mostly found in areas with marshes and mixed hardwood swamps. They can grow up to 3 inches long.	
Great Basin spadefoot toad	Spea intermontana	The Great Basin spadefoot toad is found in the area spanning from south-central British Columbia, Canada to Northwestern states of the United States, such as Wyoming, Oregon, and California. Most of the Great Basin spadefoot toads are nocturnal and their diet includes invertebrates such as ants.	
Hurter's spadefoot toad	Scaphiopus hurterii	Hurter's spadefoot toads are found in the Southern U.S states of Texas, Arkansas, Oklahoma, and Louisiana. These toads were once thought to be a subspecies of the eastern spadefoot toad.	
New Mexico spadefoot toad	Spea multiplicata	The New Mexico spadefoot toad is found in Mexico and the U.S. states of Arizona, New Mexico, Nevada, Utah, and Colorado. It grows up to 2.5 inches in length.	
Plains spadefoot toad	Spea bombifrons	The plains spadefoot toad is found in the southern prairie provinces of Canada, central states of the United States, and northern parts of Mexico. They can grow up to 2 inches in length. They can be found in the areas with sand or gravel in soils near temporary bodies of water.	
Western spadefoot toad	Spea hammondii	The western spadefoot toad can be found only in California and Baja California, Mexico. Unlike other toads, the western spadefoot only enters the water to breed.	
