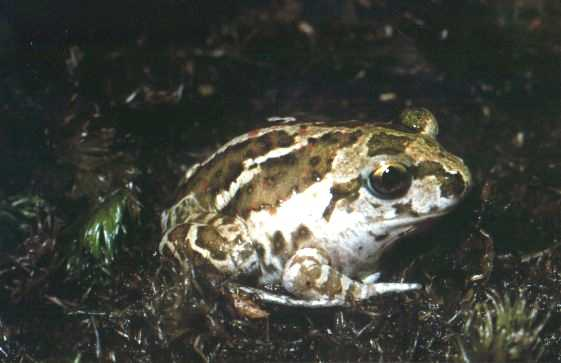
- Pelobates fuscus fuscus
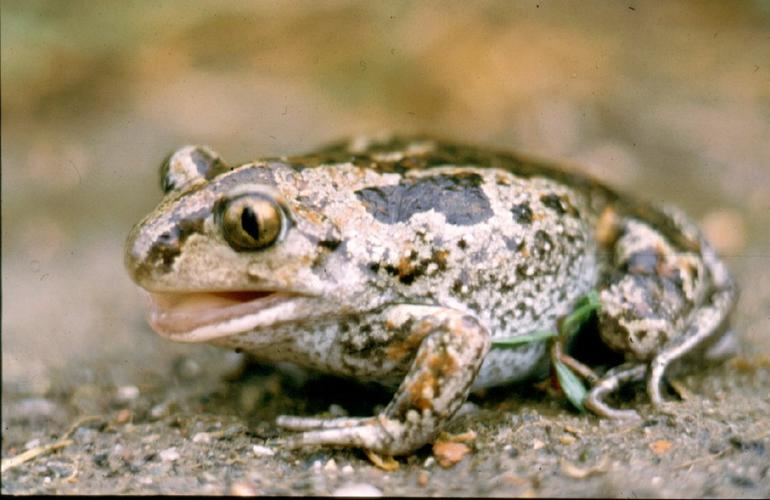
- Pelobates fuscus insubricus

Conservation status
- Least Concern (IUCN 3.1)

Scientific classification
- Kingdom: Animalia
- Phylum: Chordata
- Class: Amphibia
- Order: Anura
- Family: Pelobatidae
- Genus: Pelobates
- Species: P. fuscus

Binomial name
- Pelobates fuscus (Laurenti, 1768)

Subspecies
- P. fuscus fuscus P. fuscus insubricus
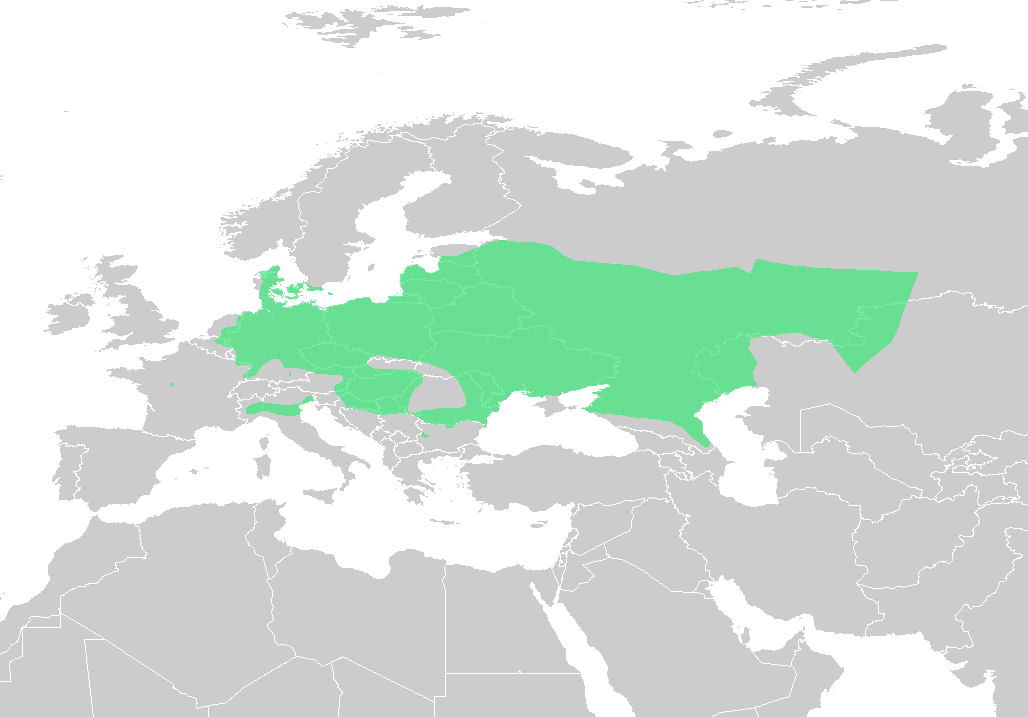

Synonyms
- Bombinator fuscus Fitzinger, 1826; Bufo fuscus Laurenti, 1768; Pelobates fuscus fuscus Mertens, 1923; Pelobates fuscus insubricus Crochet and Dubois, 2004; Pelobates fuscus insubricus Mertens, 1923; Pelobates fuscus var. lividus Koch, 1872; Pelobates fuscus var. orientalis Severtsov, 1913; Pelobates fuscus vespertinus Crochet and Dubois, 2004; Pelobates fuscus Wagler, 1830; Pelobates praefuscus Khosatzky, 1985

= Pelobates fuscus =

Pelobates fuscus Temporal range: Lower Oligocene–Recent, 33.9–0 Ma

Species of amphibian

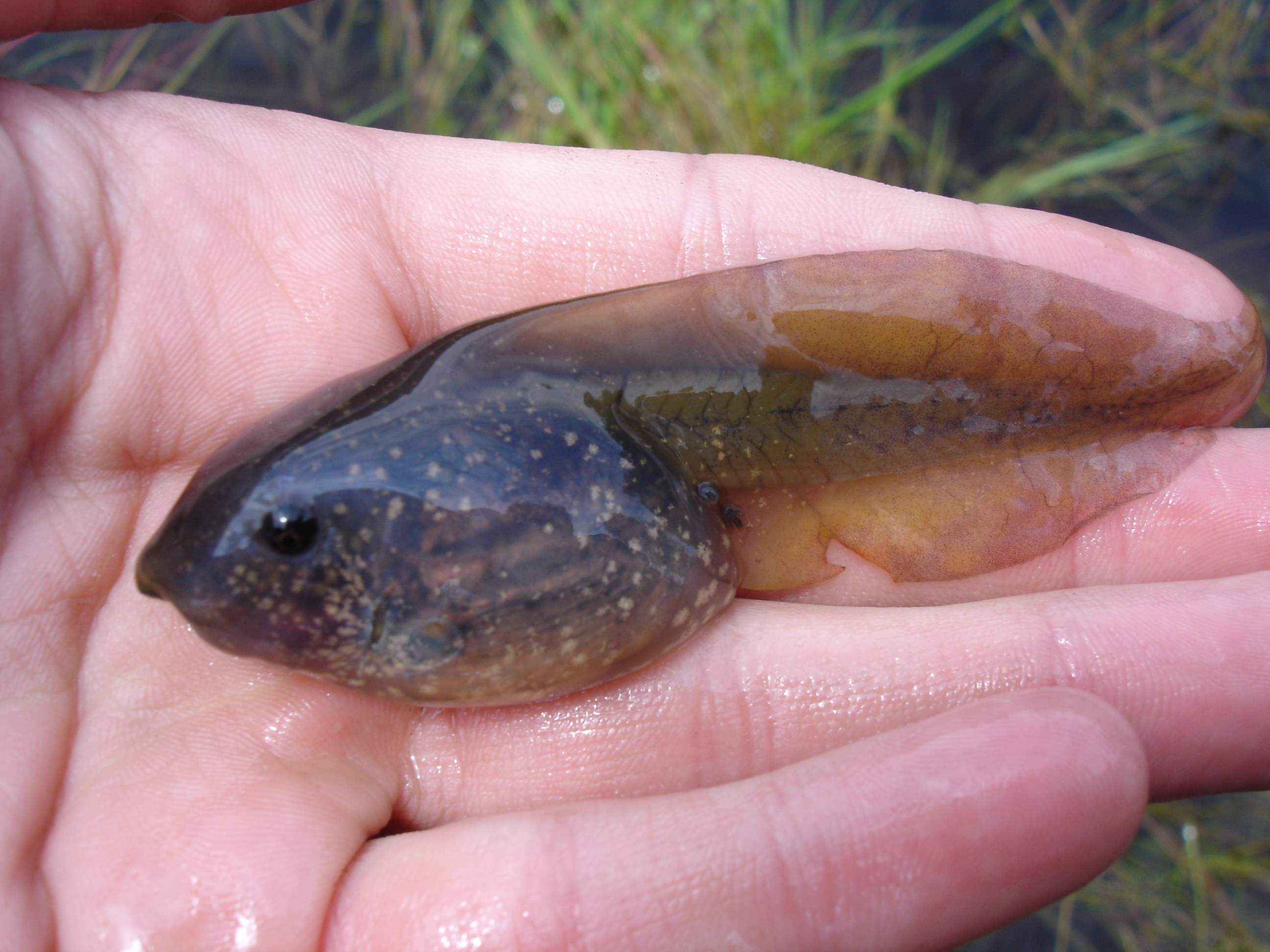
Tadpole

Pelobates fuscus is a species of toad in the family Pelobatidae, native to an area extending from Central Europe to Western Asia. It is commonly known as the common spadefoot, garlic toad, the common spadefoot toad and the European common spadefoot.

The common spadefoot grows to a length of approximately 6.5 centimetres (2.6 in) for males and 8 centimetres (3.1 in) for females. The skin colouration varies depending upon habitat, gender and region, but is usually light-grey to beige-brown on the dorsal surface. The skin is mottled by darker marks that differ between individuals. The belly is white, sometimes with grey mottling. Albino specimens have been observed.

Two subspecies are traditionally recognised: Pelobates fuscus fuscus (from central Europe) and Pelobates fuscus insubricus (from Northern Italy). In reality there is no physical or behavioural character allowing to distinguish these supposed subspecies. A recent study showed that there is no haplotype segregation for the populations of Northern Italy, that, therefore, are not to be ascribed to a different subspecies. Haplotypes from some Northern Italian valleys are very characteristic and support a different conception in terms of conservation: not for a different taxonomic position but, instead, for a peculiar differentiation. Populations from eastern Europe appear sufficiently different that they may warrant a separate species status (Pelobates vespertinus).

When alarmed, it emits a very loud call (alarm call) and it can exude a noxious secretion which smells like garlic, hence its common name.

== Locations ==
Pelobates fuscus are seen in the Posavina region. The first findings of tadpoles and the reproductive site of the common spadefoot toad in Bosnia and Herzegovina. In Croatia, this species is found along the Mura, Drava and Sava rivers. In Lombardy this species is widespread in the Ticino river in Parco naturale lombardo della Valle del Ticino.
