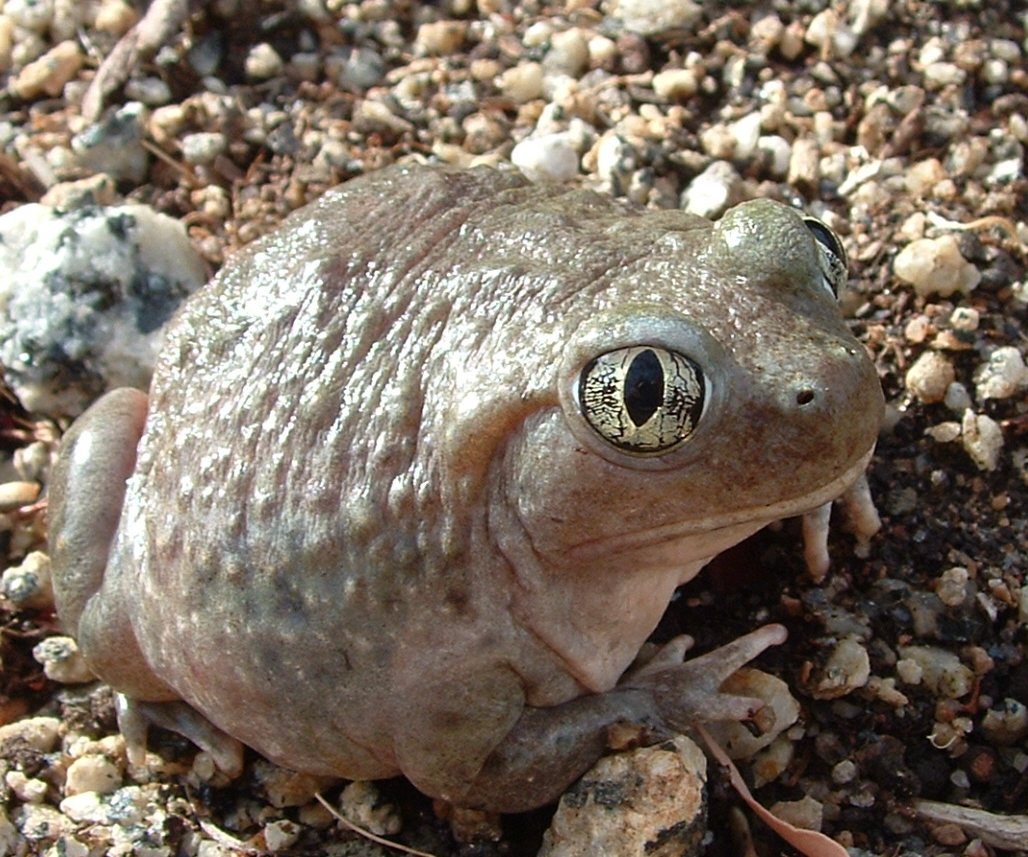

Conservation status
- Near Threatened (IUCN 3.1)

Scientific classification
- Kingdom: Animalia
- Phylum: Chordata
- Class: Amphibia
- Order: Anura
- Family: Scaphiopodidae
- Genus: Spea
- Species: S. hammondii

Binomial name
- Spea hammondii (Baird, 1859)

Synonyms
- Scaphiopus hammondii Baird, 1859 "1857"; Spea hammondii – Cope, 1866

= Spea hammondii =

Species of amphibian

Spea hammondii, also known as the western spadefoot, western spadefoot toad, Hammond's spadefoot, or Hammond's spadefoot toad, is a species of amphibian in the family Scaphiopodidae. It is found in western California (USA) and northwestern Baja California (Mexico). The specific name hammondii is in honor of physician and naturalist William Alexander Hammond.

== Description ==
Spea hammondii is a relatively smooth-skinned species of American spadefoot toad. Its eyes are pale gold with vertical pupils. It has a green or grey dorsum, often with skin tubercles tipped in orange, and has a whitish color on the abdomen. On each hind foot is a wedge-shaped black spade. Adult toads are between 3.8 and 7.5 cm (1.5 and 3.0 in) long. Juveniles have a similar appearance to adults, but with more distinct spotting.

== Distribution ==
Populations of Spea hammondii are localized, but widespread. It ranges throughout the central valley of California and as far south as San Diego and some parts of the desert. The western spadefoot prefers grassland, scrub and chaparral locally but can occur in oak woodlands. It is nocturnal, and activity is limited to the wet season, summer storms, or during evenings with elevated substrate moisture levels. It is easily handled, with less skin secretions than similar toad species. Their secretions smell like peanut butter and may cause sneezing. The western spadefoot is experiencing some habitat loss, but is still common in its range and the population declines are very minor even though it is listed as "near threatened" in some counties of California.

== Diet ==
Tadpoles feed mainly on plants and planktonic organisms, algae, ants, small invertebrates and dead aquatic larvae of amphibians, they may become cannibalistic. Adult toads feed on insects, worms and other invertebrates including; grasshoppers, true bugs, moths, ground beetles, ladybird beetles, click beetles, spiders, flies, ants and earthworms.

== Life span and reproduction ==
The average life span for Spea hammondii is about 12 years. They reach sexual maturity in their third year. The female spadefoot toad will lay up to 2,000 eggs per season. The cordon of eggs attaches to objects in the water or puddles or ditches and the male deposits sperm on them. Tadpoles emerge in as little as 15 hours. After hatching, the tadpole's only chance for survival is to develop into a toad before the puddle dries up, which takes 12 to 13 days. This is the fastest metamorphosis known for any frog or toad. Reproduction: the breeding of laying eggs normally occur from late winter to the end of March. Males will be heard during this period. Females lay numerous small, irregular clusters that will contain from 10 up to 42 eggs. They may lay more than 500 eggs in one season. Egg to transformation may occur in 8–16 days.

== Conservation ==
=== Southern California ===
Spea hammondii has lost up to 80% of its native habitat due to urban development within Southern California. Most of the remaining vernal pools that the toads rely on for reproduction lie on protected public land or preserves. Spadefoot toads have been known to take advantage of man-made standing water sources such as road ruts, cattle ponds, and artificial pools. The species is currently under review to be listed on the federal Endangered Species Act. However, it is listed as a Species of Interest for the Central Subarea and a fully covered species for the Coastal Subarea on the Natural Community Conservation Plan (NCCP) and Habitat Conservation Plan (HCP) for the County of Orange Central and Coastal Subregion. Within this region, Spea hammondii is managed as though it is listed as a state and federal endangered species.

Development in Orange County placed populations of Spea hammondii under threat, and they were relocated to newly constructed mitigation pools in 2005 and 2006. These mitigation pools are located in East Orange, Shoestring Canyon, and Irvine Mesa within Orange County Parks in the foothills of the Santa Ana mountains. A study was conducted in 2016 to monitor the reproductive success of the toads at these mitigation pools. It found that none of the five pools at East Orange or the six at Shoestring Canyon retained water during the 2016 rainy season. 12 of the 16 pools at Irvine Mesa retained water for more than 30 days. Of these 12, seven pools had successful reproduction with newly metamorphosed frogs. A 1991 study found that the average duration of vernal pools that produced metamorphosed frogs was 83.1 days. The soil at the East Orange and Shoestring Canyon sites was believed to be too porous to hold water, and the study recommended that soil may need to be compacted underneath the mitigation pools. Another suggestion was use an artificial lining under the pools to hold water. Overall, it was concluded that the mitigation pools were successful with a surviving population of Spea hammondii after 10 years.

A restoration project began in 2019 with a partnership between the California Department of Fish and Wildlife, California State Parks, Orange County Parks, and the Natural Communities Coalition to create 16 artificial breeding pools across Crystal Cove State Park and Laguna Coast Wilderness Park. The pools are expected to be completed in 2023. Ten pools will be lined with clay, while the other six will be lined with PVC to study differences in water retention. The project also will restore 15 acres of coastal sage scrub around the pools to provide foraging areas for the spadefoot toads, as well as nesting opportunities for the cactus wren.
