= List of amphibians of Northern America =

This is a checklist of amphibians found in Northern America, based mainly on publications by the Society for the Study of Amphibians and Reptiles. The information about range and status of almost all of these species can be found also for example in the IUCN Red List of Threatened Species site. It includes all species of Bermuda, Canada, Greenland, Saint Pierre and Miquelon, and the United States
* alien species

Summary of 2006 IUCN Red List categories.

Conservation status – IUCN Red List of Threatened Species:

EX – extinct, EW – extinct in the wild
CR – critically endangered, EN – endangered, VU – vulnerable
NT – near threatened, LC – least concern
DD – data deficient, NE – not evaluated
(v. 2013.2, the data are current as of March 5, 2014)

and Endangered Species Act:

E – endangered, T – threatened
XN, XE – experimental nonessential or essential population
E(S/A), T(S/A) – endangered or threatened due to similarity of appearance
(the data are current as of March 28, 2014)

== Order: Urodela ==
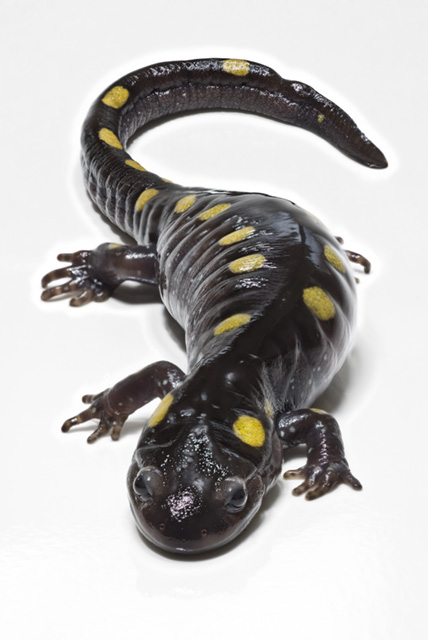
Spotted salamander, Ambystoma maculatum

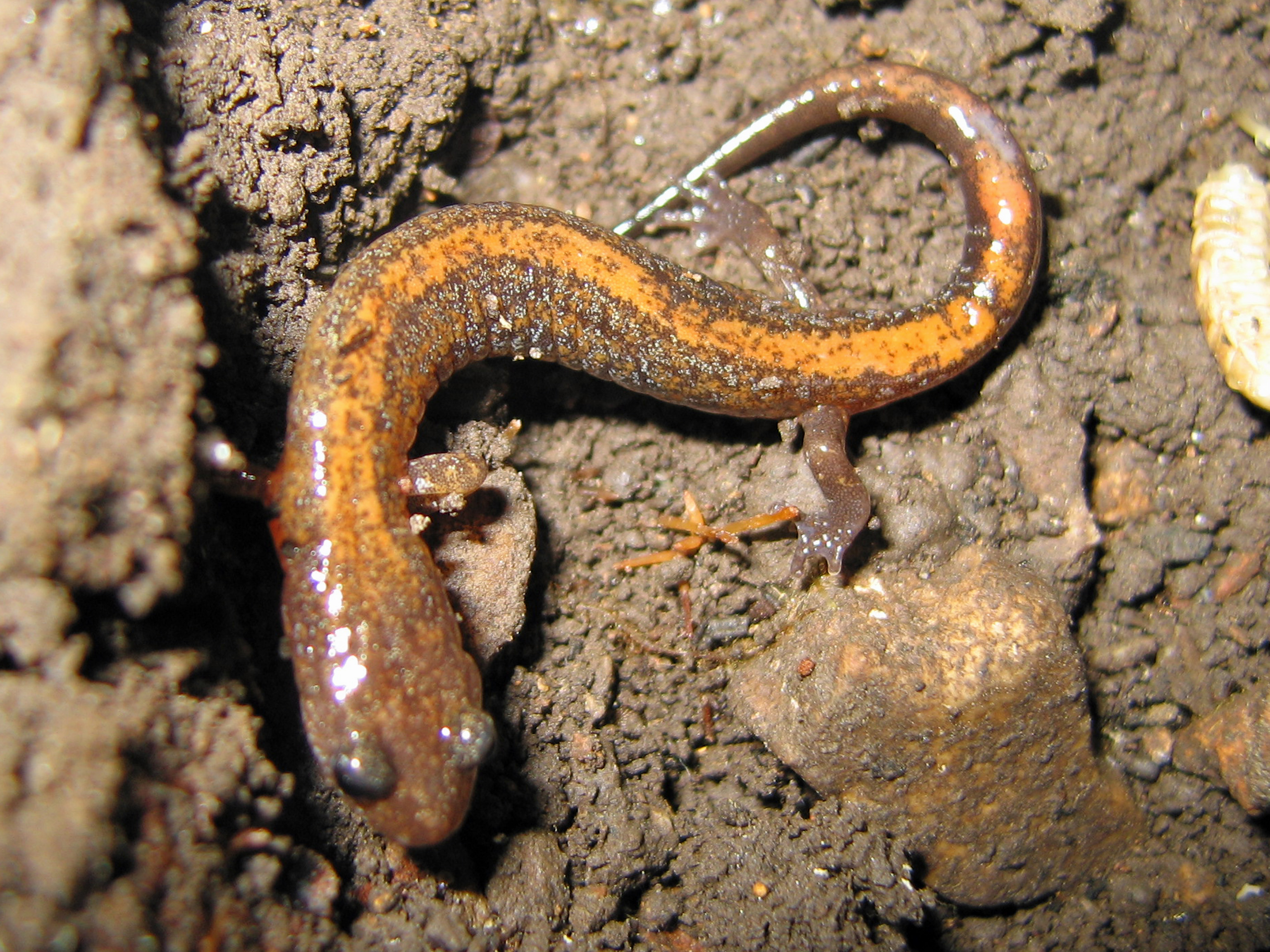
Northern zigzag salamander, Plethodon dorsalis

=== Suborder: Cryptobranchoidea ===
==== Family: Cryptobranchidae ====
Hellbender, Cryptobranchus alleganiensis NT
(Ozark hellbender, C. a. bishopi: E)

=== Suborder: Salamandroidea ===
==== Family: Salamandridae ====
===== Subfamily: Pleurodelinae =====
Eastern newts
Black-spotted newt, Notophthalmus meridionalis EN
Striped newt, Notophthalmus perstriatus NT
Eastern newt, Notophthalmus viridescens LC
Pacific newts
Rough-skinned newt, Taricha granulosa LC
Red-bellied newt, Taricha rivularis LC
Sierra newt, Taricha sierrae LC
California newt, Taricha torosa LC

==== Family: Plethodontidae ====
===== Subfamily: Plethodontinae =====
Web-toed salamanders
Limestone salamander, Hydromantes brunus VU
Mount Lyell salamander, Hydromantes platycephalus LC
Samwel Shasta salamander, Hydromantes samweli (Note: Species not listed by SSAR)
Shasta salamander, Hydromantes shastae VU
Wintu Shasta salamander, Hydromantes wintu
Climbing salamanders
Green salamander, Aneides aeneus NT
Hickory Nut Gorge green salamander, Aneides caryaensis
Clouded salamander, Aneides ferreus NT
Speckled black salamander, Aneides flavipunctatus NT and: (Note: Species split from this species or considered as distinct species alternatively. All these taxa occur in the area of interest, including the one on the left.)

Santa Cruz black salamander, Aneides (flavipunctatus) niger (Note: Subspecies elevated to full species rank) (Note: Species not recognized by SSAR)
Shasta salamander, Aneides iecanus

Sacramento Mountains salamander, Aneides hardii LC
Klamath black salamander, Aneides klamathensis
Arboreal salamander, Aneides lugubris LC
Wandering salamander, Aneides vagrans NT
Dusky salamanders
Seepage salamander, Desmognathus aeneus NT
Holbrook's southern dusky salamander, Desmognathus auriculatus LC and:

Carolina swamp dusky salamander, Desmognathus valtos (Note: Species not listed in the SSAR North American Species Names Database.)
Valentine's southern dusky salamander, Desmognathus valentinei and:

Pascagoula dusky salamander, Desmognathus pascagoula

Ouachita dusky salamander, Desmognathus brimleyorum LC
Northern dusky salamander, Desmognathus fuscus LC and:

Spotted dusky salamander, Desmognathus conanti
Flat-headed salamander, Desmognathus planiceps

Imitator salamander, Desmognathus imitator LC
Desmognathus marmoratus / Desmognathus 'quadramaculatus' complex:

Shovel-nosed salamander, Desmognathus marmoratus LC and:

Golden shovel-nosed salamander, Desmognathus aureatus (Note: Subspecies elevated to full species rank)
Black shovel-nosed salamander, Desmognathus melanius

Central shovel-nosed dusky salamander, Desmognathus intermedius
Species split from the former black-bellied salamander, Desmognathus quadramaculatus LC
(complex of "black-bellied salamanders"):

Dwarf black-bellied salamander, Desmognathus folkertsi DD
Nantahala black-bellied salamander, Desmognathus amphileucus
Cherokee blackbellied salamander, Desmognathus gvnigeusgwotli
Kanawha blackbellied salamander, Desmognathus kanawha
Pisgah black-bellied salamander, Desmognathus mavrokoilius

Seal salamander, Desmognathus monticola LC
Desmognathus ochrophaeus complex:

Mountain dusky salamander, Desmognathus ochrophaeus LC and:

Cumberland dusky salamander, Desmognathus abditus NT
Carolina mountain dusky salamander, Desmognathus carolinensis LC
Ocoee salamander, Desmognathus ocoee LC and:

Cherokee mountain dusky salamander, Desmognathus adatsihi
Great Balsams mountain dusky salamander, Desmognathus balsameus
Tallulah salamander, Desmognathus perlapsus

Blue Ridge dusky salamander, Desmognathus orestes LC

Apalachicola dusky salamander, Desmognathus apalachicolae LC

Northern pygmy salamander, Desmognathus organi
Santeetlah dusky salamander, Desmognathus santeetlah LC
Black mountain salamander, Desmognathus welteri LC
Pygmy salamander, Desmognathus wrighti LC
Ensatina
Ensatina, Ensatina eschscholtzii LC
Red Hills salamander
Red Hills salamander, Phaeognathus hubrichti EN T
Woodland salamanders
Ainsworth's salamander or Bay Springs salamander, Plethodon ainsworthi EX
Western slimy salamander, Plethodon albagula LC
Blue Ridge gray-cheeked salamander, Plethodon amplus VU
Ozark zigzag salamander, Plethodon angusticlavius LC
Scott Bar salamander, Plethodon asupak VU
Tellico salamander, Plethodon aureolus DD
Caddo Mountain salamander, Plethodon caddoensis NT
Chattahoochee slimy salamander, Plethodon chattahoochee
Cheoah Bald salamander, Plethodon cheoah VU
Atlantic Coast slimy salamander, Plethodon chlorobryonis
Red-backed salamander or eastern red-backed salamander, Plethodon cinereus LC
White-spotted slimy salamander, Plethodon cylindraceus LC
Northern zigzag salamander, Plethodon dorsalis LC
Dunn's salamander, Plethodon dunni LC
Northern ravine salamander, Plethodon electromorphus LC
Del Norte salamander, Plethodon elongatus NT
Fourche Mountain salamander, Plethodon fourchensis VU
Northern slimy salamander, Plethodon glutinosus LC and:

Southeastern slimy salamander, Plethodon grobmani
Mississippi slimy salamander, Plethodon mississippi

Valley and ridge salamander, Plethodon hoffmani LC
Peaks of Otter salamander, Plethodon hubrichti VU
Coeur d'Alene salamander, Plethodon idahoensis LC
Red-cheeked salamander, Plethodon jordani NT
Cumberland Plateau salamander, Plethodon kentucki LC
Kiamichi slimy salamander, Plethodon kiamichi DD
Louisiana slimy salamander, Plethodon kisatchie LC
Larch Mountain salamander, Plethodon larselli NT
South Mountain graycheeked salamander, Plethodon meridianus VU
Southern gray-cheeked salamander, Plethodon metcalfi LC
Northern gray-cheeked salamander, Plethodon montanus LC
Jemez Mountains salamander, Plethodon neomexicanus NT E
Cheat Mountain salamander, Plethodon nettingi NT T
Ocmulgee slimy salamander, Plethodon ocmulgee
Rich Mountain salamander, Plethodon ouachitae NT
Pigeon Mountain salamander, Plethodon petraeus VU
White-spotted salamander, Plethodon punctatus NT
Ravine salamander or southern ravine salamander, Plethodon richmondi LC
Savannah slimy salamander, Plethodon savannah
Sequoyah slimy salamander, Plethodon sequoyah DD
Southern red-backed salamander, Plethodon serratus LC
Shenandoah salamander, Plethodon shenandoah VU E
Big Levels salamander, Plethodon sherando VU
Red-legged salamander, Plethodon shermani VU
Siskiyou Mountains salamander, Plethodon stormi EN
Southern Appalachian salamander, Plethodon teyahalee LC
Van Dyke's salamander, Plethodon vandykei LC
South Carolina slimy salamander, Plethodon variolatus
Western redback salamander, Plethodon vehiculum LC
Southern zigzag salamander, Plethodon ventralis LC
Shenandoah Mountain salamander, Plethodon virginia NT
Webster's salamander, Plethodon websteri LC
Wehrle's salamander, Plethodon wehrlei LC and:

Dixie Caverns salamander, Plethodon dixi
Blacksburg salamander, Plethodon jacksoni
Yellow-spotted woodland salamander, Plethodon pauleyi

Weller's salamander, Plethodon welleri EN
Yonahlossee salamander, Plethodon yonahlossee LC
Patch-nosed salamander, Urspelerpes brucei

===== Subfamily: Spelerpinae =====
Brook salamanders
Two-lined salamander (Eurycea bislineata) complex:

Northern two-lined salamander, Eurycea bislineata LC
Brown-backed salamander, Eurycea aquatica
Junaluska salamander, Eurycea junaluska VU
Blue Ridge two-lined salamander, Eurycea wilderae LC
Southern two-lined salamander, Eurycea cirrigera LC and:

Carolina sandhills salamander, Eurycea arenicola

Salado Springs salamander, Eurycea chisholmensis VU T
Three-lined salamander, Eurycea guttolineata LC
Cascade Caverns salamander, Eurycea latitans VU and:

Comal blind salamander, Eurycea tridentifera VU

Long-tailed salamander, Eurycea longicauda LC
Cave salamander, Eurycea lucifuga LC
Eurycea multiplicata complex:

Many-ribbed salamander, Eurycea multiplicata LC
Grotto salamander, Eurycea spelaea LC and:

Southern grotto salamander, Eurycea braggi
Northern grotto salamander, Eurycea nerea

Ouachita streambed salamander, Eurycea subfluvicola
Oklahoma salamander, Eurycea tynerensis NT

San Marcos salamander, Eurycea nana VU T
Georgetown salamander, Eurycea naufragia EN T
Texas salamander, Eurycea neotenes VU
Blanco River Springs salamander, Eurycea pterophila DD
Eurycea quadridigitata complex:

Southeastern dwarf salamander, Eurycea quadridigitata LC
Chamberlain's dwarf salamander, Eurycea chamberlaini DD
Hillis's dwarf salamander, Eurycea hillisi
Western dwarf salamander, Eurycea paludicola
Bog dwarf salamander, Eurycea sphagnicola

Barton Springs salamander, Eurycea sosorum VU E
Jollyville Plateau salamander, Eurycea tonkawae EN T
Valdina Farms salamander, Eurycea troglodytes DD
Austin blind salamander, Eurycea waterlooensis VU E
Texas blind salamander, Eurycea rathbuni VU E
Blanco blind salamander, Eurycea robusta DD
Georgia blind salamander, Eurycea wallacei VU
Spring salamanders
Berry Cave salamander, Gyrinophilus gulolineatus EN
Tennessee cave salamander, Gyrinophilus palleucus VU
Spring salamander, Gyrinophilus porphyriticus LC
West Virginia spring salamander, Gyrinophilus subterraneus EN
Red and mud salamanders
Mud salamander, Pseudotriton montanus LC and:

Midland mud salamander, Pseudotriton (montanus) diastictus

Red salamander, Pseudotriton ruber LC
Many-lined salamander
Many-lined salamander, Stereochilus marginatus LC

===== Subfamily: Bolitoglossinae =====
Slender salamanders
Subgenus: Batrachoseps
California slender salamander, Batrachoseps attenuatus LC
San Gabriel slender salamander, Batrachoseps gabrieli DD
Batrachoseps diabolicus group:

Hell Hollow slender salamander, Batrachoseps diabolicus DD
Greenhorn Mountains slender salamander, Batrachoseps altasierrae
Sequoia slender salamander, Batrachoseps kawia DD
Kings River slender salamander, Batrachoseps regius VU

Batrachoseps nigriventris group:

Black-bellied slender salamander, Batrachoseps nigriventris LC
Fairview slender salamander, Batrachoseps bramei
Gregarious slender salamander, Batrachoseps gregarius LC
Relictual slender salamander, Batrachoseps relictus DD
Kern Canyon slender salamander, Batrachoseps simatus VU
Tehachapi slender salamander, Batrachoseps stebbinsi VU

Batrachoseps pacificus group:

Channel Islands slender salamander, Batrachoseps pacificus LC
Arguello slender salamander, Batrachoseps wakei
Southern California slender salamander, Batrachoseps major LC (desert slender salamander B. (m.) aridus: E)
Lesser slender salamander, Batrachoseps minor DD
Gabilan Mountains slender salamander, Batrachoseps gavilanensis LC
San Simeon slender salamander, Batrachoseps incognitus DD
Santa Lucia Mountains slender salamander, Batrachoseps luciae LC

Subgenus: Plethopsis
Inyo Mountains salamander, Batrachoseps campi EN
Kern Plateau salamander, Batrachoseps robustus NT
Oregon slender salamander, Batrachoseps wrighti VU

===== Subfamily: Hemidactyliinae =====
Fourtoed salamander, Hemidactylium scutatum LC

==== Family: Proteidae ====
Dwarf waterdog, Necturus punctatus LC
Alabama waterdog, Necturus alabamensis EN and:

Mobile waterdog, Necturus lodingi (sometimes recognized)

Gulf Coast waterdog, Necturus beyeri LC
Neuse River waterdog, Necturus lewisi NT
Common mudpuppy, Necturus maculosus LC and:

Red River mudpuppy, Necturus (maculosus) louisianensis

Apalachicola waterdog, Necturus moleri
Escambia waterdog, Necturus mounti

==== Family: Ambystomatidae ====
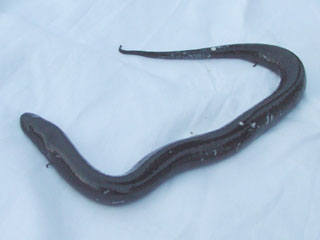
Two-toed amphiuma, Amphiuma means

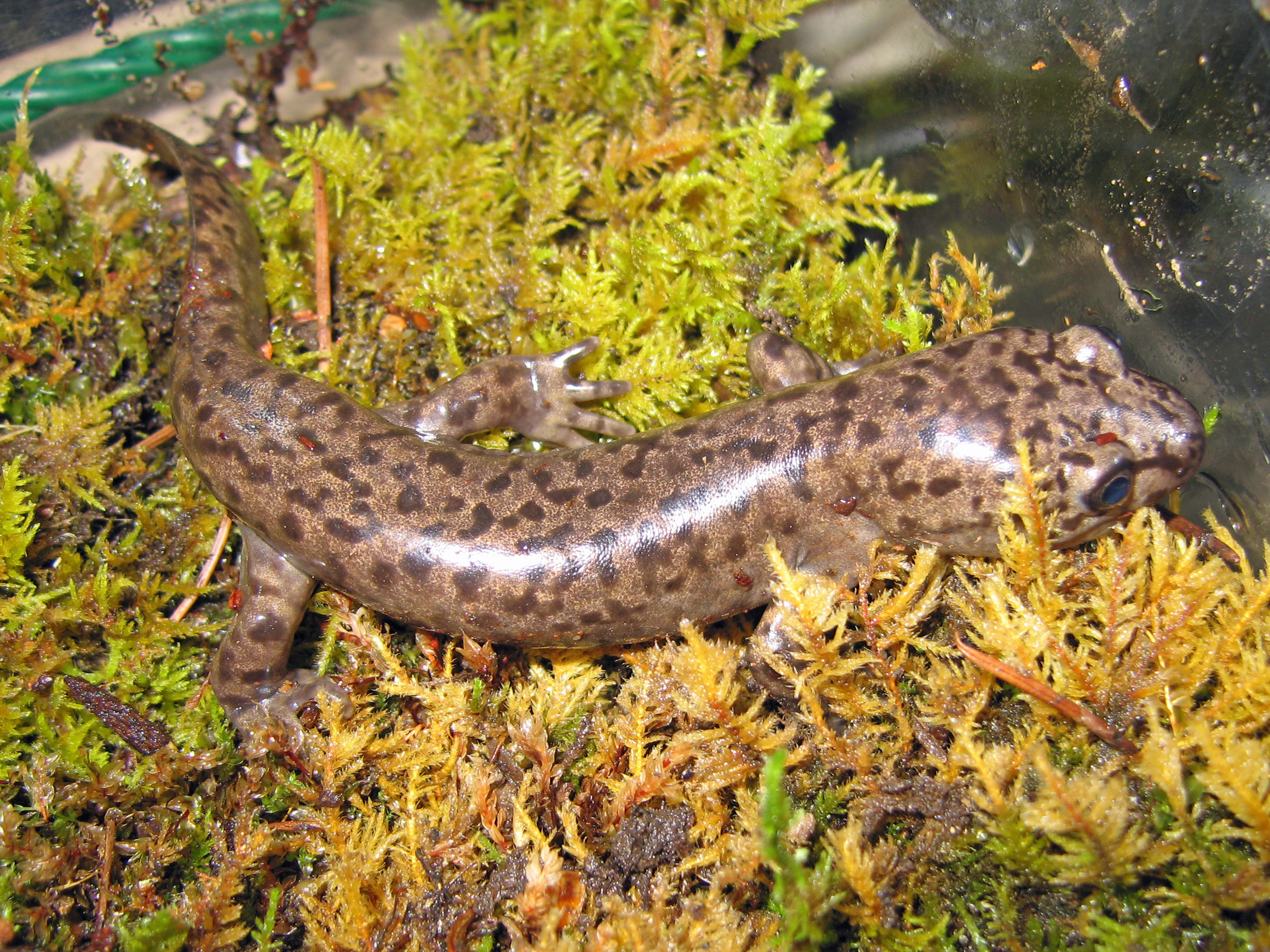
Coastal giant salamander, Dicamptodon tenebrosus

Ringed salamander, Ambystoma annulatum LC
Streamside salamander, Ambystoma barbouri NT
Frosted flatwoods salamander, Ambystoma cingulatum VU T and:

Reticulated flatwoods salamander, Ambystoma bishopi VU E

California tiger salamander, Ambystoma californiense VU (Santa Barbara and Sonoma Counties E, central California T)
Northwestern salamander, Ambystoma gracile LC
Jefferson salamander, Ambystoma jeffersonianum LC
Blue-spotted salamander, Ambystoma laterale LC
Mabee's salamander, Ambystoma mabeei LC
Long-toed salamander, Ambystoma macrodactylum LC (Santa Cruz long-toed salamander, A. m. croceum: E)
Spotted salamander, Ambystoma maculatum LC
Western tiger salamander, Ambystoma mavortium (Sonoran tiger salamander, A. m. stebbinsi: E)
Marbled salamander, Ambystoma opacum LC
Mole salamander, Ambystoma talpoideum LC
Small-mouthed salamander, Ambystoma texanum LC
Eastern tiger salamander, Ambystoma tigrinum LC

==== Family: Amphiumidae ====
Two-toed amphiuma, Amphiuma means LC
One-toed amphiuma, Amphiuma pholeter NT
Three-toed amphiuma, Amphiuma tridactylum LC

==== Family: Dicamptodontidae ====
Idaho giant salamander, Dicamptodon aterrimus LC
Cope's giant salamander, Dicamptodon copei LC
California giant salamander, Dicamptodon ensatus NT
Coastal giant salamander, Dicamptodon tenebrosus LC

==== Family: Rhyacotritonidae ====
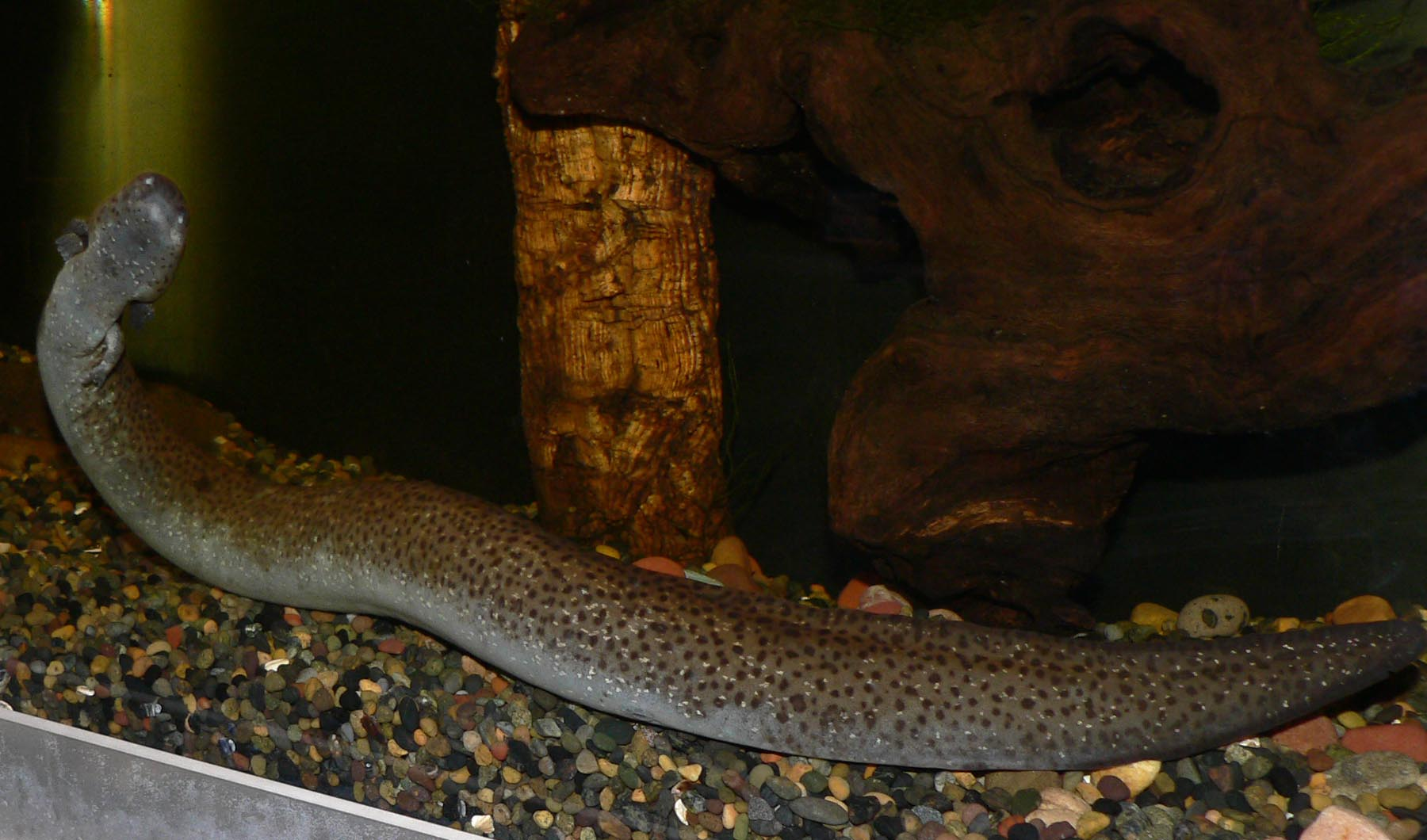
Lesser siren, Siren intermedia

Cascade torrent salamander, Rhyacotriton cascadae NT
Columbia torrent salamander, Rhyacotriton kezeri NT
Olympic torrent salamander, Rhyacotriton olympicus VU
Southern torrent salamander, Rhyacotriton variegatus LC

=== Suborder: Sirenoidea ===
==== Family: Sirenidae ====
Dwarf sirens
Southern dwarf siren, Pseudobranchus axanthus LC
Northern dwarf siren, Pseudobranchus striatus LC
Sirens
Lesser siren, Siren intermedia LC
Greater siren, Siren lacertina LC
Reticulated siren, Siren reticulata

== Order: Anura ==
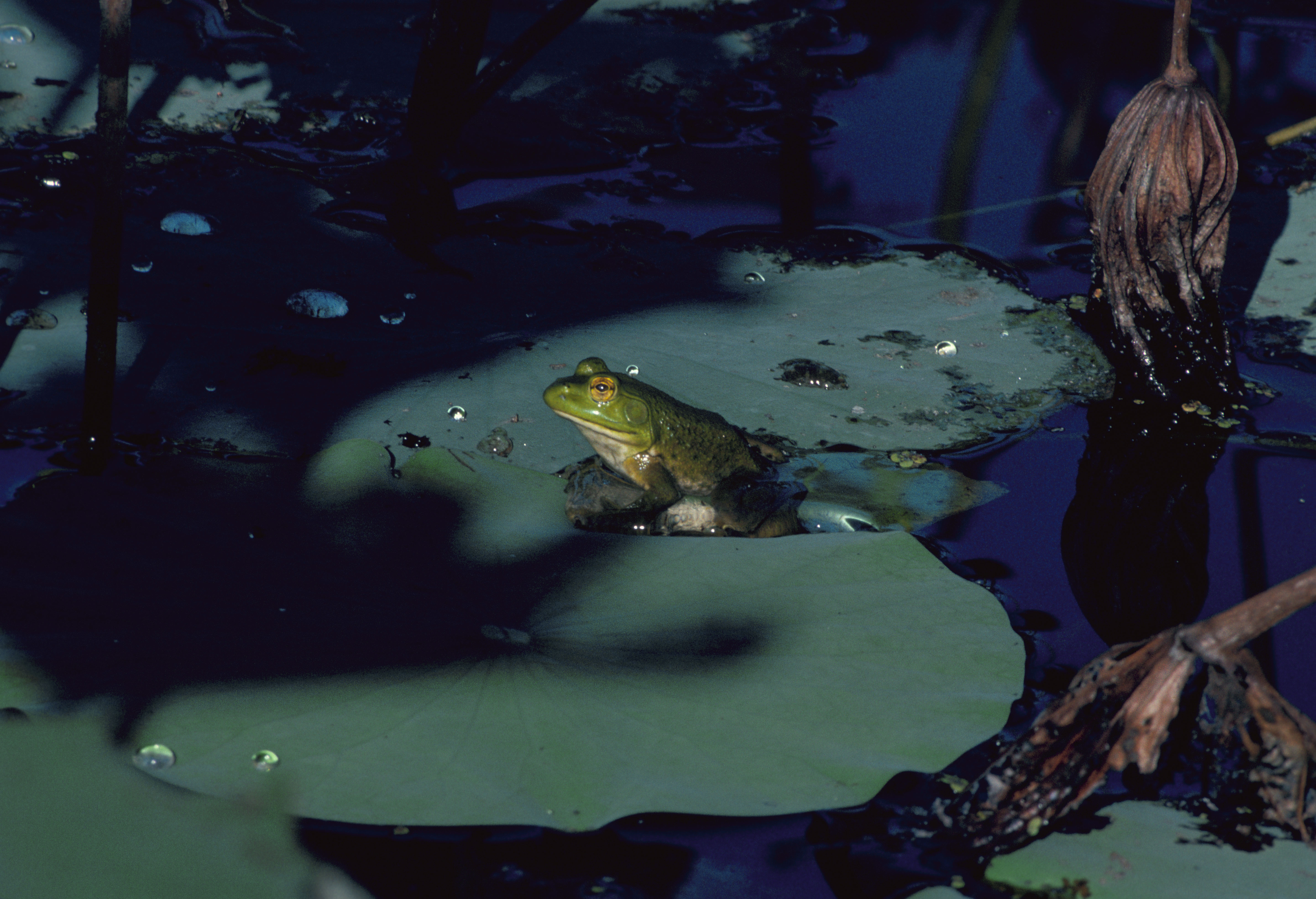
American bullfrog Lithobates catesbeiana

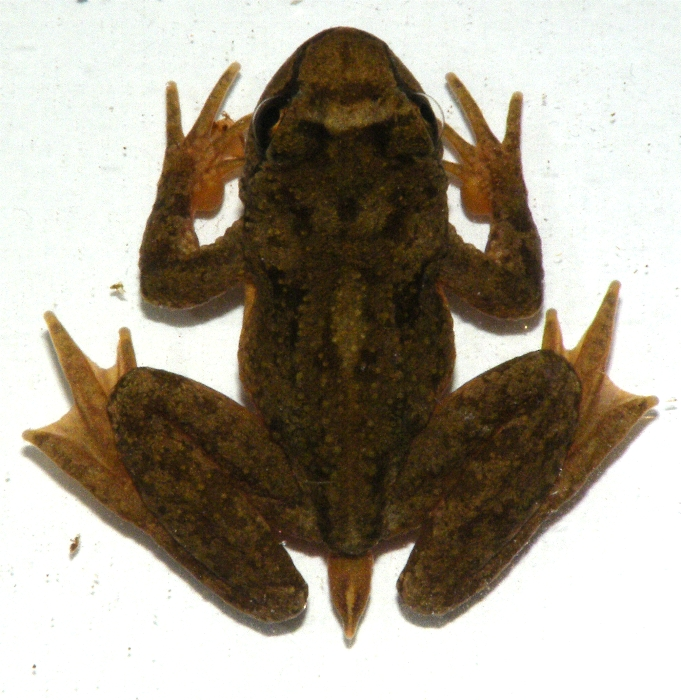
Coastal tailed frog, Ascaphus truei

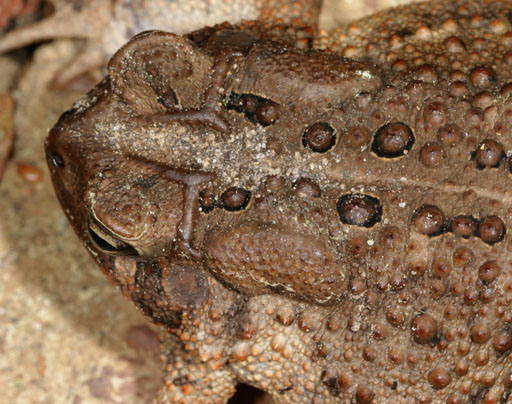
American toad Anaxyrus americanus: detail of parotoid glands

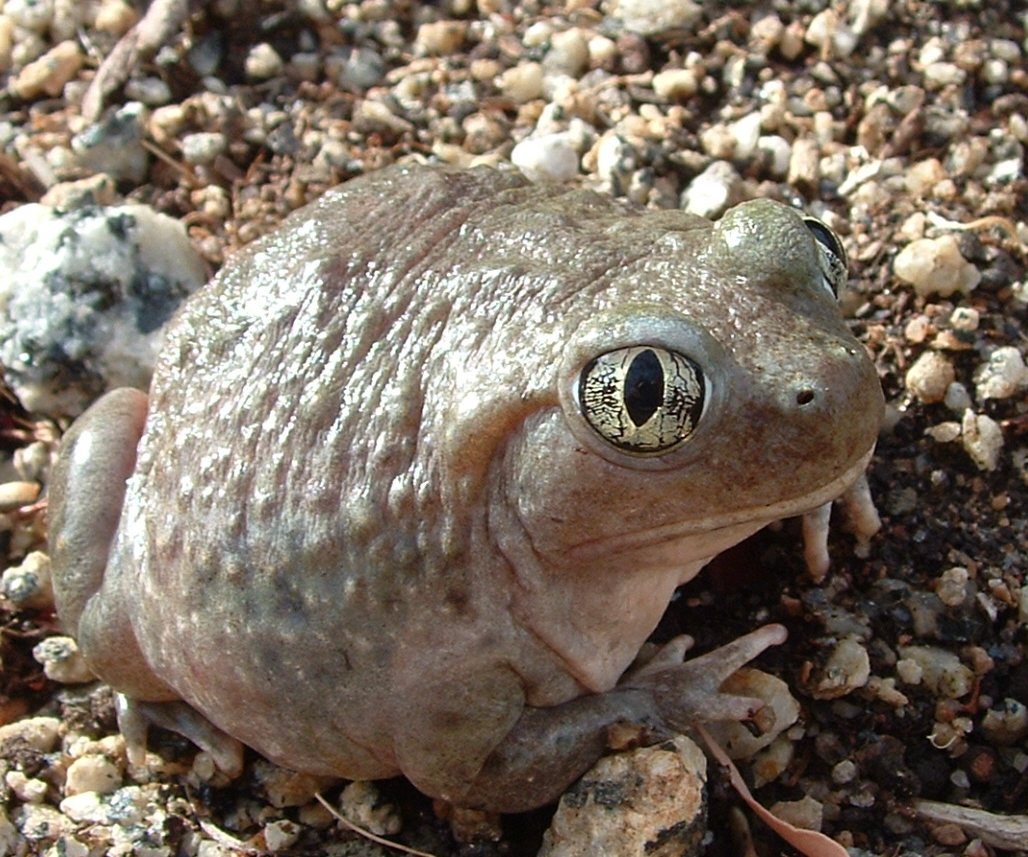
Western spadefoot toad Spea hammondii

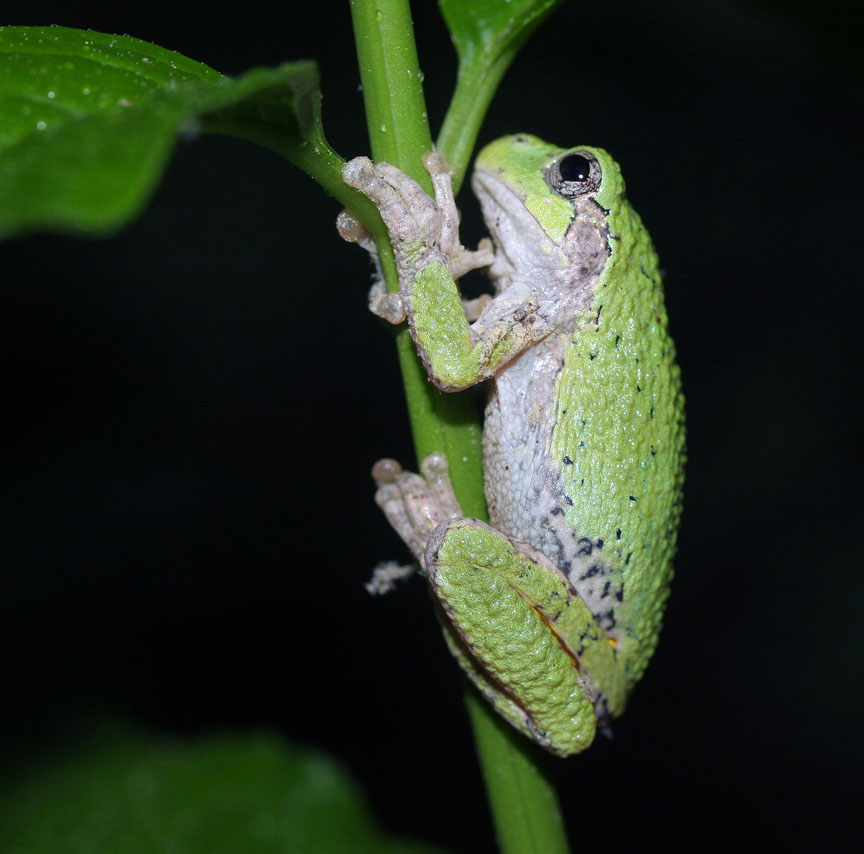
Gray tree frog, Hyla versicolor

=== Suborder: Archaeobatrachia ===
==== Family: Ascaphidae ====
Rocky Mountain tailed frog, Ascaphus montanus LC
Coastal tailed frog, Ascaphus truei LC

=== Suborder: Mesobatrachia ===
==== Family: Pipidae ====
African clawed frog, Xenopus laevis * LC
Western clawed frog, Xenopus tropicalis * LC

==== Family: Rhinophrynidae ====
Burrowing toad, Rhinophrynus dorsalis LC

==== Family: Scaphiopodidae ====
North American spadefoot toads
Couch's spadefoot, Scaphiopus couchii LC
Eastern spadefoot, Scaphiopus holbrookii LC
Hurter's spadefoot, Scaphiopus hurterii LC
Western spadefoot toads
Plains spadefoot, Spea bombifrons LC
Western spadefoot, Spea hammondii NT
Great Basin spadefoot, Spea intermontana LC
Mexican spadefoot, Spea multiplicata LC

=== Suborder: Neobatrachia ===
==== Family: Bufonidae ====
American toad, Anaxyrus americanus LC
Wyoming toad, Anaxyrus baxteri EW
Western toad, Anaxyrus boreas LC and:

Amargosa toad, Anaxyrus nelsoni EN

Arroyo toad, Anaxyrus californicus EN E
Yosemite toad, Anaxyrus canorus EN
Great Plains toad, Anaxyrus cognatus LC
Chihuahuan green toad, Anaxyrus debilis LC
Black toad, Anaxyrus exsul VU
Fowler's toad, Anaxyrus fowleri LC
Canadian toad, Anaxyrus hemiophrys LC E
Houston toad, Anaxyrus houstonensis EN E
Arizona toad, Anaxyrus microscaphus LC
Hot Creek toad, Anaxyrus monfontanus
Railroad Valley toad, Anaxyrus nevadensis
Red-spotted toad, Anaxyrus punctatus LC
Oak toad, Anaxyrus quercicus LC
Sonoran green toad, Anaxyrus retiformis LC
Texas toad, Anaxyrus speciosus LC
Southern toad, Anaxyrus terrestris LC
Woodhouse's toad, Anaxyrus woodhousii LC
Dixie Valley toad, Anaxyrus williamsi
Colorado River toad, Incilius alvarius LC
Coastal plains toad, Incilius nebulifer LC (formerly in Incilius valliceps)
South American cane toad, Rhinella marina LC and:

Mesoamerican Cane toad, Rhinella horribilis

==== Family: Hylidae ====
===== Subfamily: Hylinae =====
Tree frogs
Pine Barrens tree frog, Hyla andersonii (Dryophytes andersonii) NT
Canyon tree frog, Hyla arenicolor (Dryophytes arenicolor) LC
Bird-voiced tree frog, Hyla avivoca (Dryophytes avivoca) LC
Cope's gray treefrog, Hyla chrysoscelis (Dryophytes chrysoscelis) LC
American green tree frog, Hyla cinerea (Dryophytes cinereus) LC
Pine woods tree frog, Hyla femoralis (Dryophytes femoralis) LC
Barking tree frog, Hyla gratiosa (Dryophytes gratiosus) LC
Squirrel tree frog, Hyla squirella (Dryophytes squirellus) LC
Gray tree frog, Hyla versicolor (Dryophytes versicolor) LC
Arizona tree frog, Hyla wrightorum (Dryophytes wrightorum) LC (formerly in Hyla eximia)
Chorus frogs
Mountain chorus frog, Pseudacris brachyphona LC and:

Collinses' mountain chorus frog, Pseudacris collinsorum

Brimley's chorus frog, Pseudacris brimleyi LC
California tree frog, Pseudacris cadaverina LC
Spotted chorus frog, Pseudacris clarkii LC
Spring peeper, Pseudacris crucifer LC
Western chorus frog, Pseudacris triseriata LC and:

Upland chorus frog, Pseudacris feriarum LC and:

Cajun chorus frog, Pseudacris fouquettei LC

New Jersey chorus frog, Pseudacris kalmi LC

Pacific tree frog, Pseudacris regilla LC and:

Baja California tree frog, Pseudacris hypochondriaca
Sierran tree frog, Pseudacris sierra

Illinois chorus frog, Pseudacris illinoensis or Pseudacris streckeri illinoensis
Boreal chorus frog, Pseudacris maculata LC
Southern chorus frog, Pseudacris nigrita LC
Little grass frog, Pseudacris ocularis LC
Ornate chorus frog, Pseudacris ornata LC
Strecker's chorus frog, Pseudacris streckeri LC
Cricket frogs
Cricket frog, Acris crepitans LC and:

Blanchard's cricket frog, Acris (crepitans) blanchardi (Note: Subspecies elevated to full species rank)

Southern cricket frog, Acris gryllus LC
Other tree frogs
Cuban tree frog, Osteopilus septentrionalis * LC
Mexican tree frog, Smilisca baudinii LC
Lowland burrowing tree frog, Smilisca fodiens LC

==== Family: Pelodryadidae ====
(Australian treefrogs)
Australian green tree frog, Ranoidea caerulea * LC

==== Family: Ranidae ====
Typical frogs
Northern red-legged frog, Rana aurora LC and:

California red-legged frog, Rana draytonii VU T

Foothill yellow-legged frog, Rana boylii NT
Cascades frog, Rana cascadae NT
Columbia spotted frog, Rana luteiventris LC
Southern mountain yellow-legged frog, Rana muscosa EN E and:

Sierra Nevada yellow-legged frog, Rana sierrae EN

Oregon spotted frog, Rana pretiosa VU
Water frogs
American bullfrog, Lithobates catesbeianus LC
Gopher frog, Lithobates capito NT
Crawfish frog, Lithobates areolatus NT
Mississippi gopher frog or dusky gopher frog, Lithobates sevosus CR E
Rio Grande leopard frog, Lithobates berlandieri LC
Plains leopard frog, Lithobates blairi LC
Chiricahua leopard frog, Lithobates chiricahuensis VU T and:

Ramsey Canyon leopard frog, Lithobates subaquavocalis CR,

Green frog, Lithobates clamitans or Rana clamitans LC
Vegas Valley leopard frog, Lithobates fisheri EX
Pig frog, Lithobates grylio LC
River frog, Lithobates heckscheri LC
Florida bog frog, Lithobates okaloosae or Rana okaloosae VU
Relict leopard frog, Lithobates onca or Rana onca EN
Pickerel frog, Lithobates palustris LC
Northern leopard frog, Lithobates pipiens or Rana pipiens LC and:

Mid-Atlantic coast leopard frog, Lithobates kauffeldi

Mink frog, Lithobates septentrionalis LC
Southern leopard frog, Lithobates sphenocephalus LC
Wood frog, Lithobates sylvaticus LC
Tarahumara frog, Lithobates tarahumarae or Rana tarahumarae VU
Carpenter frog, Lithobates virgatipes LC
Lowland leopard frog, Lithobates yavapaiensis LC
Japanese wrinkled frog, Glandirana rugosa * LC (Hawaii only)

==== Family: Craugastoridae ====
Barking frog, Craugastor augusti LC

==== Family: Eleutherodactylidae ====
===== Subfamily: Eleutherodactylinae =====
Coquí, Eleutherodactylus coqui * LC (Puerto Rico only)
Rio Grande chirping frog, Eleutherodactylus cystignathoides LC, only:

Rio Grande chirping frog, Eleutherodactylus (cystignathoides) campi

Spotted chirping frog, Eleutherodactylus guttilatus LC

Antilles coqui, Eleutherodactylus johnstonei LC (Bermuda, introduced), and:

Montserrat whistling frog, Eleutherodactylus montserratae (Bermuda)

Cliff chirping frog, Eleutherodactylus marnockii LC
Greenhouse frog, Eleutherodactylus planirostris * LC

==== Family: Leptodactylidae ====
===== Subfamily: Leptodactylinae =====
Mexican white-lipped frog, Leptodactylus fragilis LC

==== Family: Microhylidae ====
===== Subfamily: Gastrophryninae =====
Sheep frog, Hypopachus variolosus LC

===== Subfamily: Microhylinae =====
North American narrow-mouthed frogs
Eastern narrow-mouthed toad, Gastrophryne carolinensis LC
Western narrow-mouthed toad, Gastrophryne olivacea LC and:

Sinaloan narrow-mouthed toad, Gastrophryne mazatlanensis

==== Family: Dendrobatidae ====
===== Subfamily: Dendrobatinae =====
Green-and-black poison dart frog, Dendrobates auratus * LC (Hawaii only)

== See also ==
- List of reptiles of North America north of Mexico
- List of U.S. state reptiles
- List of U.S. state amphibians
- List of threatened reptiles and amphibians of the United States
- List of U.S. state birds
- List of birds of North America
- List of U.S. state mammals
- List of mammals of North America
- Lists of reptiles by region
- Lists of amphibians by region
