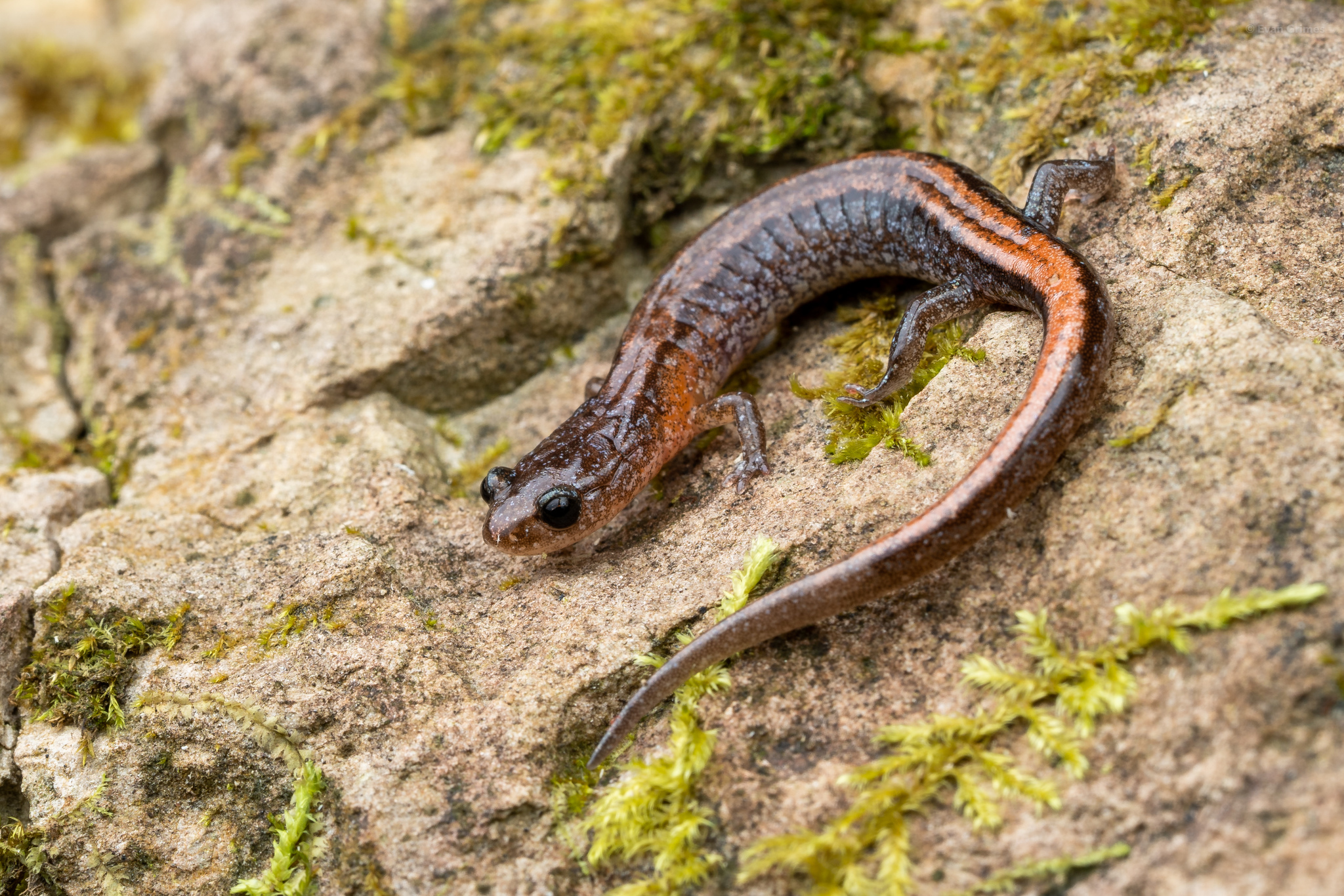

Conservation status
- Least Concern (IUCN 3.1)

- Vulnerable (NatureServe)

Scientific classification
- Kingdom: Animalia
- Phylum: Chordata
- Class: Amphibia
- Order: Urodela
- Family: Plethodontidae
- Genus: Plethodon
- Species: P. websteri

Binomial name
- Plethodon websteri Highton, 1979

= Webster's salamander =

Species of amphibian

The Webster's salamander (Plethodon websteri) is a species of salamander in the family Plethodontidae. It is endemic to the southeast United States, in patchy and disjunct lowland subpopulations ranging from South Carolina to Louisiana. Its natural habitat is mixed mesophytic temperate forests, in association with rocky streams and outcrops.

== Description ==
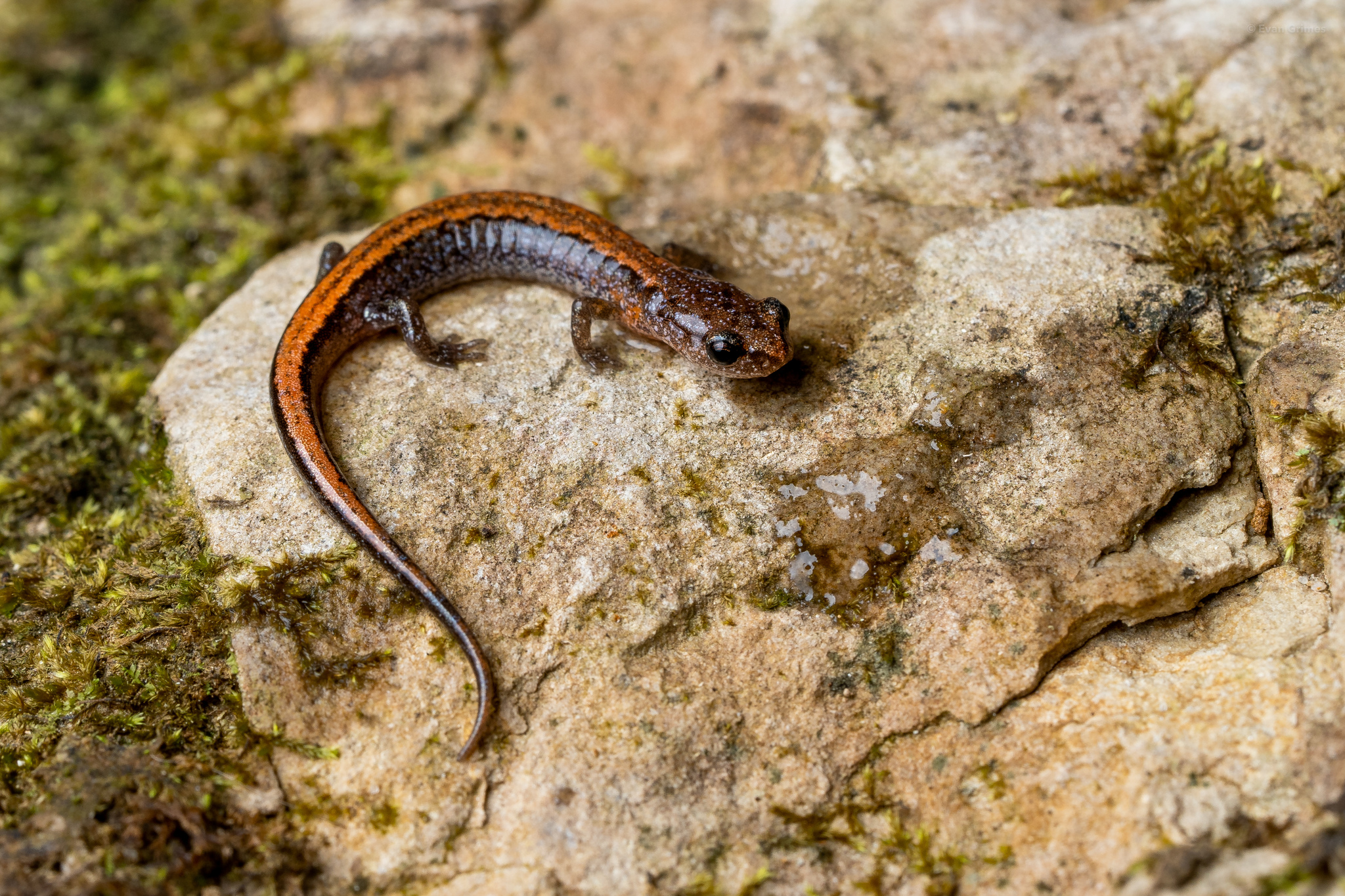
Individual from western Mississippi with distinct dorsal stripe

Webster's salamander is a cryptic species which is morphologically nearly indistinguishable from several other eastern Plethodon species, including red-backed salamanders (P. cinereus, P. serratus) and zigzag salamanders (P. angusticlavius, P. dorsalis, P. ventralis). Like these species, Webster's salamander is a small plethodontid with a wide range of color patterns on a dark brown background. The back often has a red, orange, or yellow dorsal stripe which may have irregular edges, or it may be unstriped entirely. The dorsal stripe, when present, is typically brighter on the tail than the torso. The flanks and underside are speckled with white, red, and black. Webster's salamander is mainly differentiated through genetic data and its geographic range, which mostly does not overlap with similar species.

There is some sympatric overlap with the southern zigzag salamander (P. ventralis) in northern Alabama. Although these species may be confused with each other in that area, they never hybridize, and P. websteri is usually found in a striped morph while P. ventralis is usually in an unstriped morph where they co-occur. P. websteri and P. ventralis have subtle but measurable differences in head shape, and this appears to be unrelated to their diet or broader climate conditions. Variation in head shape is strongest between different populations of each species and has no correlation with each population's degree of sympatry. Competition-induced character displacement is unlikely to be the cause of these morphological differences, through microclimate preferences are a possible (albeit unstudied) factor.

== Taxonomy ==
P. websteri was genetically differentiated from P. ventralis (at the time considered a southern population of the northern zigzag salamander, P. dorsalis) in 1979. It was one of the earliest cryptic species to be differentiated primarily on the basis of molecular data. At the time, it was considered to be part of the welleri group, a clade containing zigzag salamanders and Weller's salamander (P. welleri). Later data suggests that it is not closely related to other salamanders in the welleri group, despite its similar appearance. Some studies have even argued that it is closer to slimy salamanders (the glutinosus group), though this is not universally agreed upon.

Distinct subpopulations of P. websteri are genetically divergent, and the species is estimated to have split into two major clades approximately 5.3 million years ago. One clade (the "type locality clade") is distributed over most of Alabama and eastern Mississippi. The other clade (the "Semlitch clade") encompasses three subpopulations: one in western Mississippi and Louisiana, another in east-central Alabama, and a third in Georgia and South Carolina. These four subdivisions line up with transitions between different level III ecoregions. They could have diverged under the indirect allopatric influence of shifting rivers. Rivers would have altered local erosion patterns to bury or expose rocky areas, which salamanders depend on for summer shelter. Despite their overlapping distribution, the two major clades have enough genetic distinction that they may represent two sister species, rather than a single species.

== Ecology ==
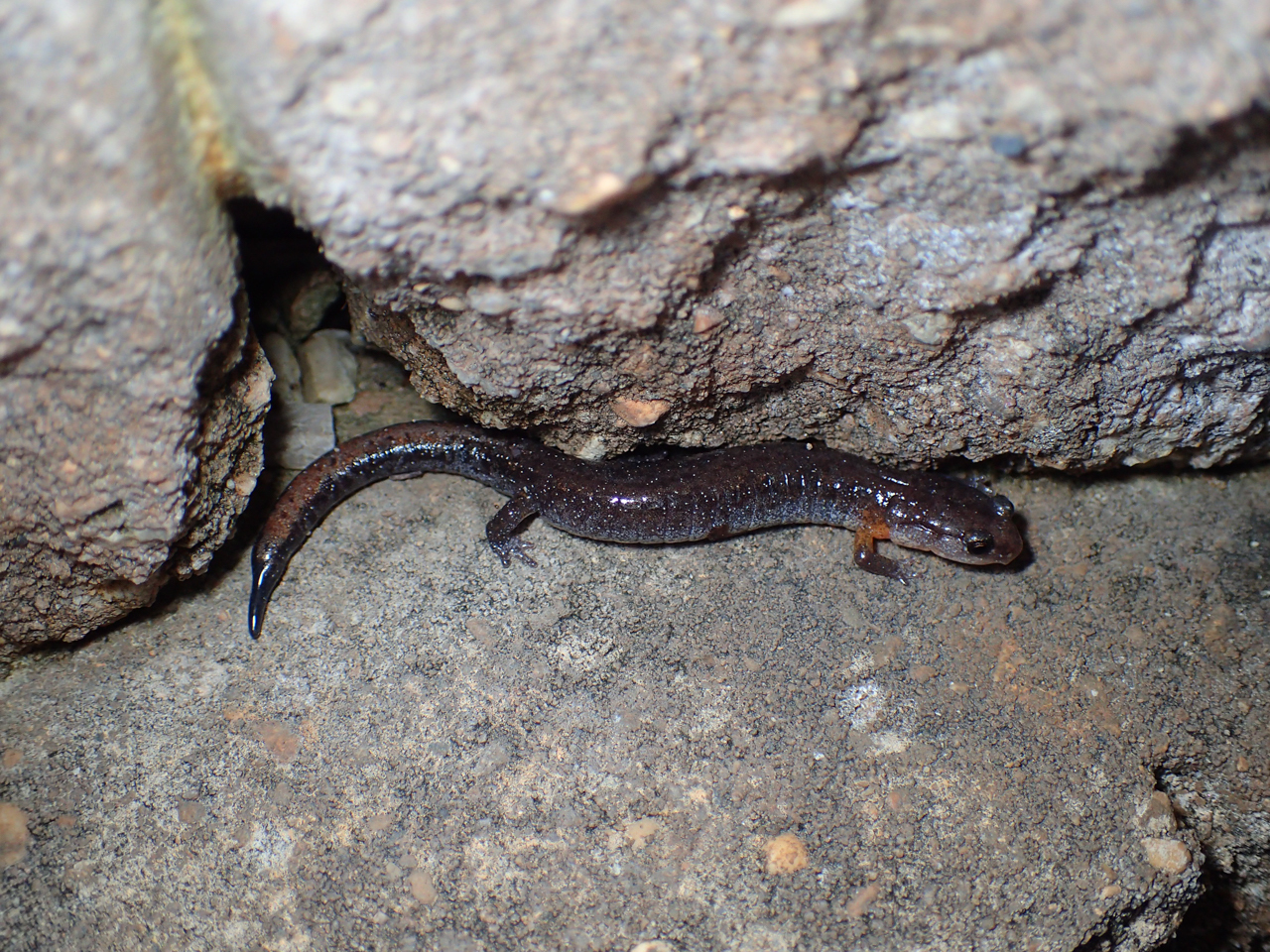
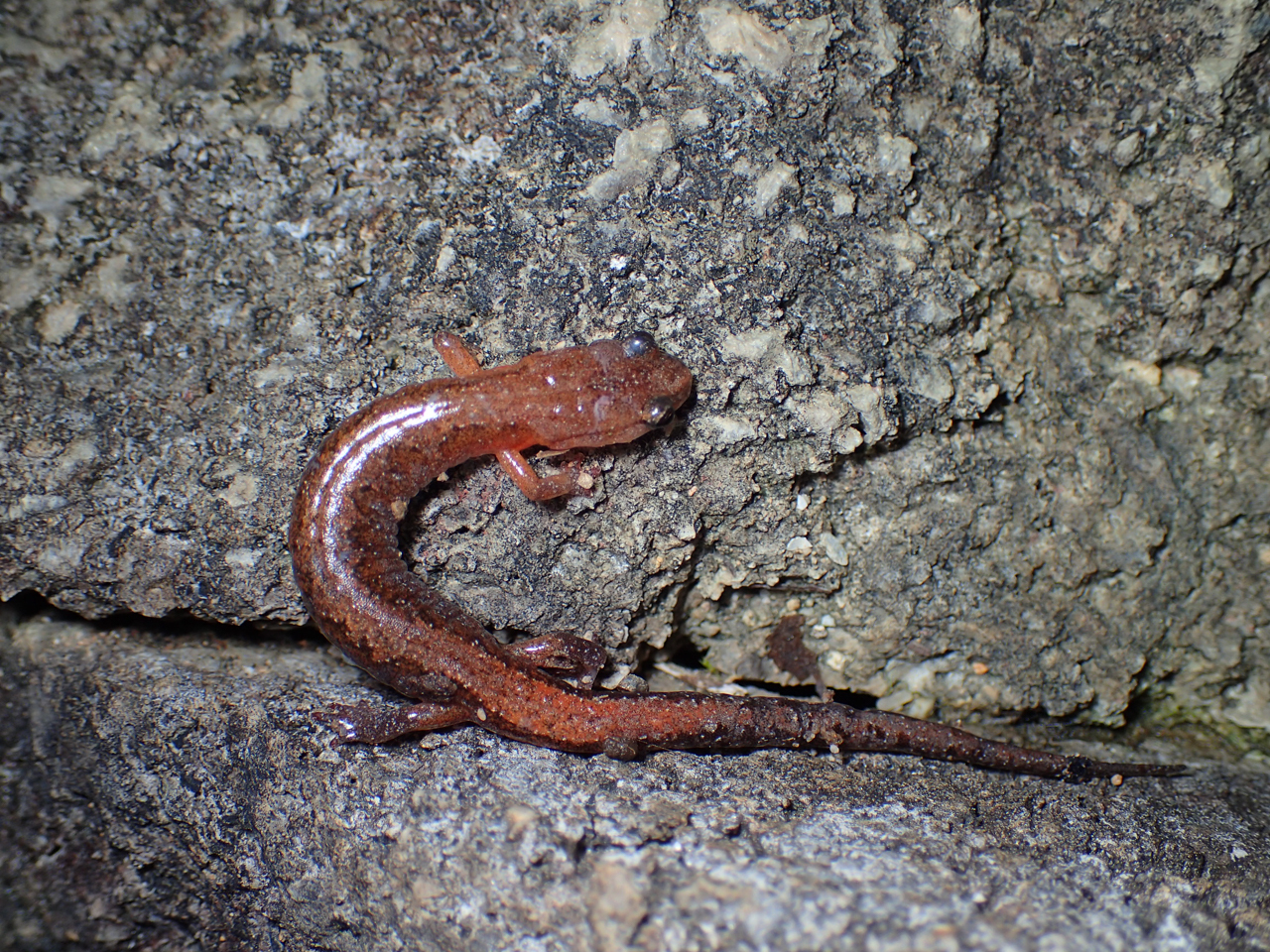
Individuals from western Alabama with different color patterns

Individuals forage on the forest floor from late October to early May, with activity levels and observations reaching their peak in the winter. Individuals could be readily found sheltering under logs even on dry days in the winter, while no individuals were observed at all during the summer, regardless of the weather. Juveniles stay out slightly longer than adults, but even they disappear by June. The breeding season was probably from January to March according to the biology of collected males. Though oviposition has not been directly observed, the species is an annual breeder and direct developer like other Plethodon species. Females have a clutch size of 3-8 eggs (usually 5 or 6), presumably laid during the summer, which hatch into terrestrial young soon afterwards. This is among the smallest clutch size in any plethodontid, and is probably a consequence of their small adult size. Most growth is achieved during active months (October to May), and the age of sexual maturity is estimated to be around 2 years on average.

Individuals are often assumed to take shelter underground during the inhospitable summer, and drift fence experiments have helped to reveal exactly how this movement occurs. As warmer months approach, salamanders travel on humid nights towards rock outcrops and crevasses, which allow access to cooler and moister underground refuge from summer heat. These cooler areas would serve as dens for brooding females and newly hatched juveniles, as well as other sheltering individuals. Deep naturally occurring refuges are particularly important to this species, which is among the southernmost members of the genus Plethodon and probably has poor burrowing ability due to its small and fragile build. A few more northern plethodontids with a similar body shape (like the eastern red-backed salamander, P. cinereus) are also known to move into burrows for summer aestivation. P. cinereus relies mostly on soil disturbances and burrows created by other animals, which may be too warm and shallow to be an effective solution for Webster's salamander.

Small individuals feed primarily on mites and springtails. Larger individuals switch to larger prey such as ants, and some feed on large quantities of termites when available. This is similar to the diet of southern red-backed salamanders (Plethodon serratus) occupying the same size range.

== Conservation status ==
Plethodon websteri is currently listed as Least Concern by the IUCN, due to its wide distribution and presumably large population. However, it is still threatened by habitat loss and the disjunct nature of its populations. NatureServe lists the species as vulnerable (G3) at a national level. State-by-state, NatureServe lists it as vulnerable (S3) in Alabama, imperiled (S2) in Georgia, Mississippi, and South Carolina, and critically imperiled (S1) in Louisiana. Its main threat is deforestation and conversion of its natural mixed forest habitat into pine monocultures. Though possibly declining in Alabama, it has some resistance to habitat degradation, as it is known from secondary growth forest.
