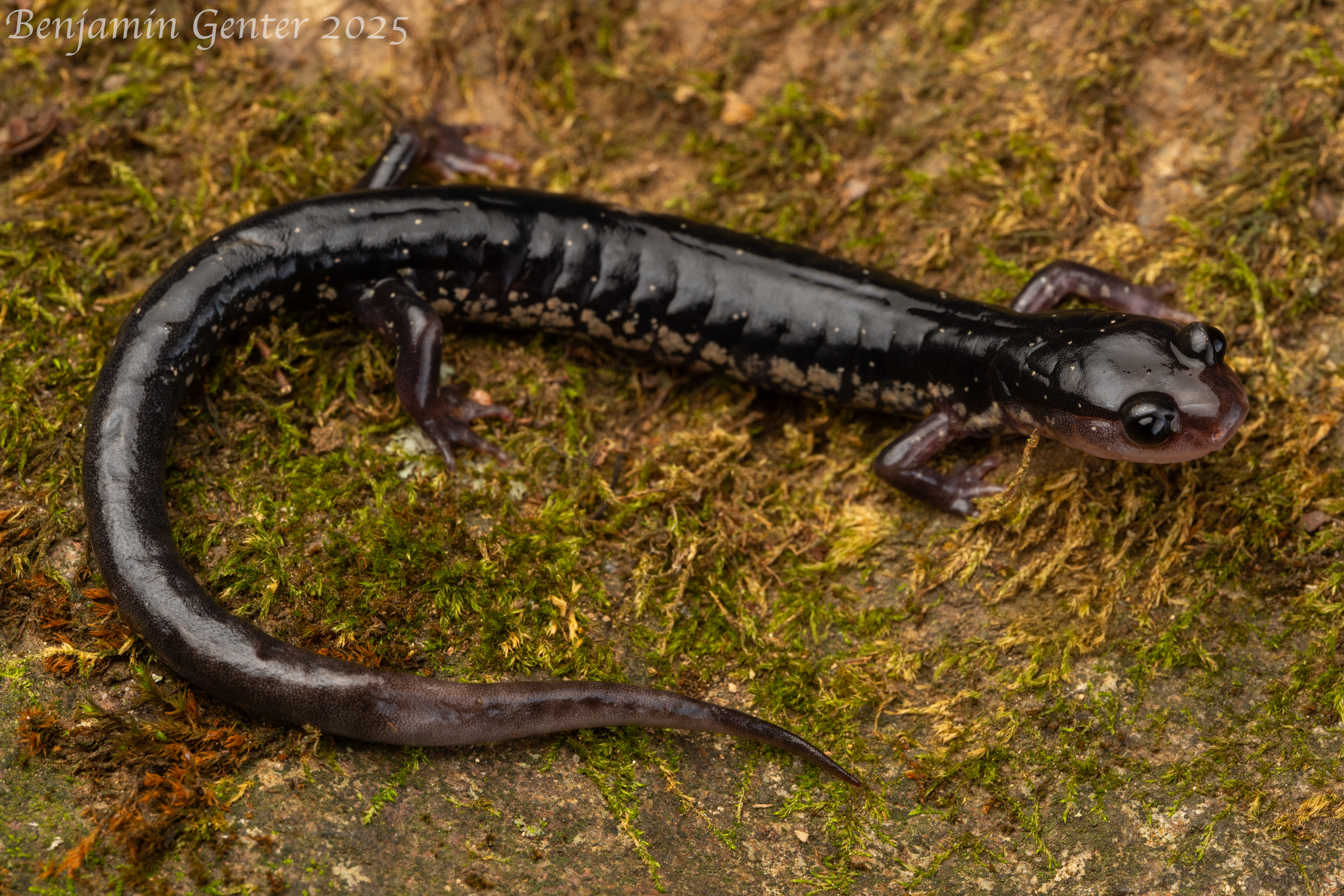

Conservation status
- Vulnerable (NatureServe)

Scientific classification
- Kingdom: Animalia
- Phylum: Chordata
- Class: Amphibia
- Order: Urodela
- Family: Plethodontidae
- Genus: Plethodon
- Species: P. chattahoochee

Binomial name
- Plethodon chattahoochee Highton, 1989

= Chattahoochee slimy salamander =

Species of amphibian

The Chattahoochee slimy salamander (Plethodon chattahoochee) is a species of salamander in the family Plethodontidae. It is endemic to the Appalachian Mountains in the United States, where it is found only in the Chattahoochee National Forest and Nantahala National Forest in the states of Georgia and North Carolina. Its natural habitat is temperate forests. It was once classified within the northern slimy salamander (P. glutinosus) until it was found to be a distinct species. Its range narrowly intersects with the northern slimy salamander, the Atlantic Coast slimy salamander (P. chlorobryonis), and the southern Appalachian salamander (P. teyahalee) and widely intersects with the red-legged salamander (P. shermani), and it is known to hybridize with the latter three.
