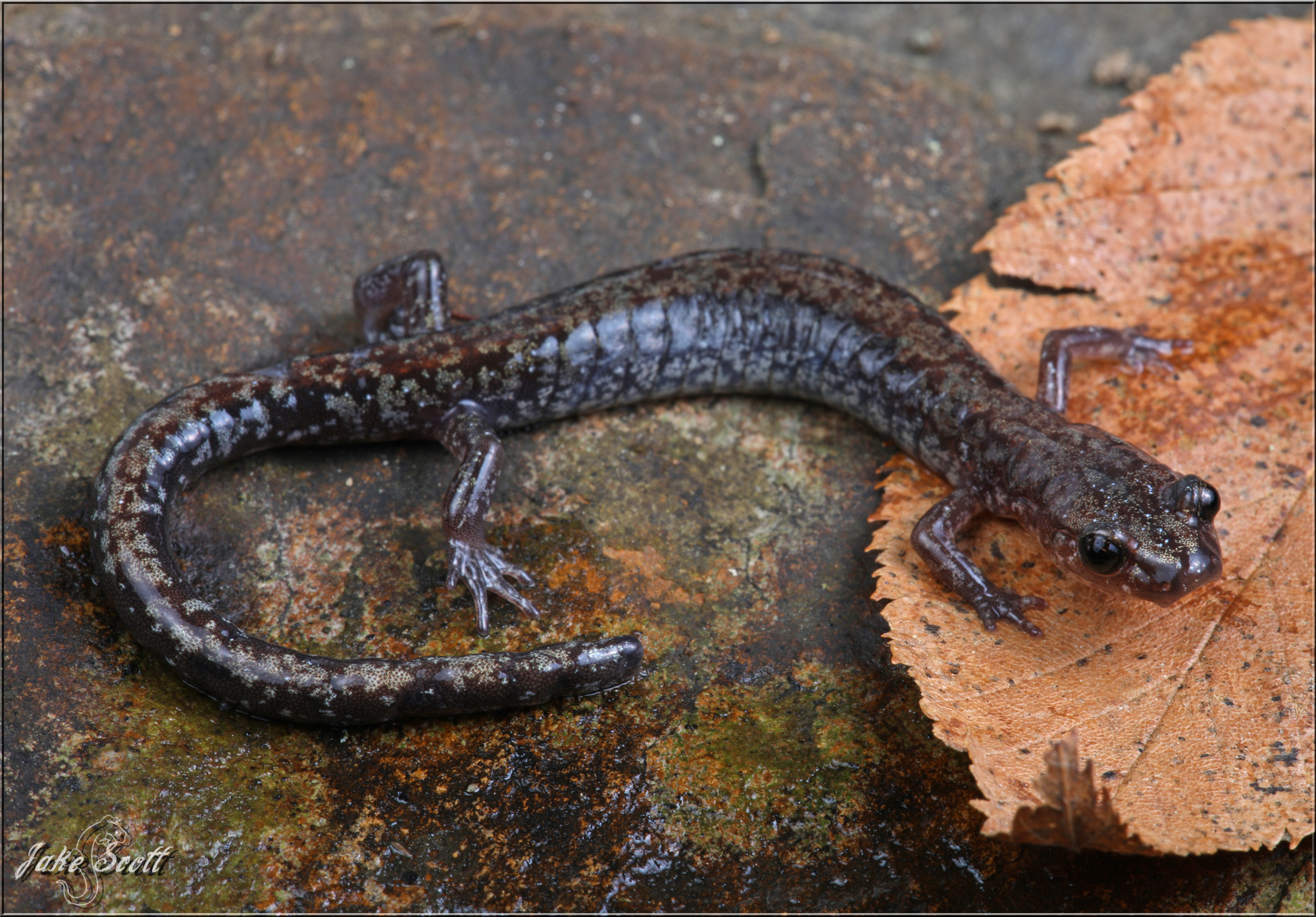

Conservation status
- Vulnerable (IUCN 3.1)

Scientific classification
- Kingdom: Animalia
- Phylum: Chordata
- Class: Amphibia
- Order: Urodela
- Family: Plethodontidae
- Genus: Plethodon
- Species: P. sherando

Binomial name
- Plethodon sherando Highton, 2004

= Big Levels salamander =

Species of amphibian

The Big Levels salamander (Plethodon sherando) is a species of salamander in the family Plethodontidae. It is endemic to Virginia in the eastern United States. First described in 2004, it derives its specific name, sherando, from Sherando Lake in the George Washington National Forest. Its common name refers to the Big Levels area of southeastern Augusta County, Virginia, a series of flat to gently rolling mountain tops in the Blue Ridge Mountains, where it was found.

It is listed as Vulnerable on the IUCN Red List due to its limited distribution. Little is known about its conservation status or threats, but it may be threatened by logging-related ecosystem degradation.

== Description ==
The Big Levels salamander is a small salamander of the genus Plethodon within the Plethodon cinereus group (the red-backed salamander and closely related species). Physically, it is most similar to P. cinereus and P. serratus, which have gray and white (sometimes yellow) coloring on the underside of the body. Plethodon sherando has a greater amount of white pigmentation than gray. The back is red and gray, sometimes with stripes or spots. The legs are longer and the head slightly wider in P. sherando compared to P. cinereus.

The holotype is an adult male which measured 95 mm (3.7 in) in total length and 42 mm (1.7 in) from snout to vent.

== Habitat ==
Its habitats include temperate forests and rocky areas. At the edge of its range, it was found to co-occur with Plethodon cinereus at lower elevations, but was the only species of small Plethodon at higher elevations. In a study published in 2016, P. sherando and P. cinereus occupied significantly different microhabitats, with P. sherando in habitats with warmer air temperature but cooler substrate temperatures and P. cinereus in habitats with higher relative humidity and cooler air temperatures.
