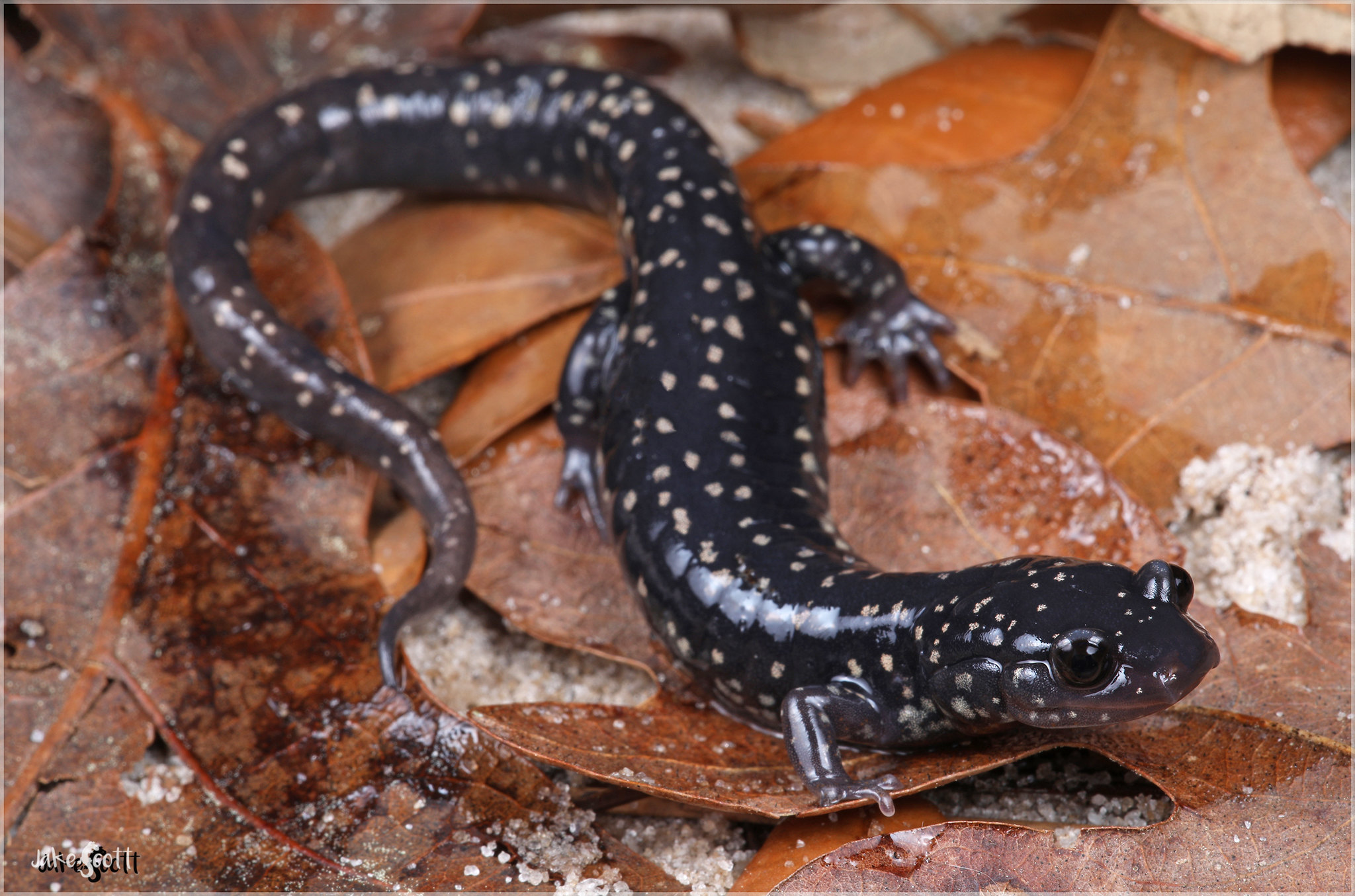

Scientific classification
- Kingdom: Animalia
- Phylum: Chordata
- Class: Amphibia
- Order: Urodela
- Family: Plethodontidae
- Genus: Plethodon
- Species: P. ocmulgee

Binomial name
- Plethodon ocmulgee Highton, 1989

= Ocmulgee slimy salamander =

Species of amphibian

The Ocmulgee slimy salamander (Plethodon ocmulgee) is a species of salamander in the family Plethodontidae. It is endemic to the state of Georgia in the United States, where it is found in regions of the coastal plain and Piedmont that are associated with the Ocmulgee River drainage system. It is only known from a few counties, and due to this restricted range, it is at high risk of extinction. Many populations of this species are already experiencing precipitous declines, with some even possibly being extirpated.

== Description ==
The Ocmulgee slimy salamander is primarily black in coloration, with white or yellow circles distributed across the body, increasing in density on the underside. The extremities tend to be slightly lighter than the torso, and a total length of 4.5-7.0 in (11.4-20.3 cm) including tail length, is considered typical. Like all lungless salamanders, Ocmulgee slimy salamanders have four toes on their forelimbs, and five on the back-limbs. The slimy salamanders derive their name from a slimy, sometimes sticky secretion produced by skin glands. As lungless salamanders, Ocmulgee slimy salamanders breathe through their skin and through mucous membranes in their throats, these methods require them to remain moist. Despite this, they lack a larval aquatic stage, and hatch from terrestrial eggs immediately capable of locomotion.

== Taxonomy ==
The Ocmulgee slimy salamander is one of fifty-six salamander species in the genus Plethodon, of the family Plethodontidae, or lungless salamanders. For many years the Ocmulgee slimy salamander population was considered to be conspecific with the species Plethodon glutinosus, the northern slimy salamander. It took until 1989 for Plethodon glutinosus to be split into the thirteen species P. glutinosus complex, the species of which are visually very similar. Apart from location, the only way to tell many of the species apart is chromosomal analysis.

== Distribution ==
As may be guessed from their common name, P. ocmulgee are exclusively known from the counties surrounding the Ocmulgee River drainage basin, primarily the lower segment in the coastal plains of southern Georgia. The Ocmulgee river spans a large portion of the state of Georgia, and provides drinking water for dozens of communities as well as water for agriculture and energy production. The pollution these sources feed into the river may endanger the Ocmulgee slimy salamanders already limited habitat. The Ocmulgee is the westernmost tributary of the Altamaha River, and the salamanders have also been observed in counties surrounding the Altamaha.

== Behavior ==
Ocmulgee slimy salamanders primarily feed on insects, and their diets tend to be composed largely of woodlice, ants, beetles, and worms. Like many lungless salamanders, they are territorial and claim small territories which they jealously guard. Because they must remain moist in order to breathe, they remain mostly in the proximity of bodies of water, as well as in burrows and under rocks, logs, and leaf litter. Ocmulgee slimy salamanders are nocturnal, preferring to come out in the open when it is cooler and stay hidden during the day.

=== Reproduction ===
When a male is sexually mature, it will develop a prominent mental gland on the underside of its chin, this gland produces hormones to induce female interest. Males will rub the gland on the females to spread the hormones, females can easily be identified by the sight of eggs causing the abdomen to bulge. After breeding, the female will lay a clutch of eggs in a suitable moist, sheltered place and proceed to guard the eggs until they hatch. Eggs generally hatch after 3 months on average, and juveniles resemble miniature adults, without a larval stage. Ocmulgee slimy salamanders take around 2 years to fully mature.
