= Ainsworth's salamander =

Conservation status
- Extinct (IUCN 3.1)

- Possibly Extinct (NatureServe)

Scientific classification
- Kingdom: Animalia
- Phylum: Chordata
- Class: Amphibia
- Order: Urodela
- Family: Plethodontidae
- Genus: Plethodon
- Species: †P. ainsworthi

Binomial name
- †Plethodon ainsworthi Lazell, 1998

Extinct species of amphibian

Ainsworth's salamander (Plethodon ainsworthi) is an extinct species of salamander in the family Plethodontidae. It was endemic to the United States and only known from its type series collected in Jasper County, Mississippi in 1964. Later research has cast doubt to its validity; it might be a junior synonym of Plethodon mississippi.

== Description ==
Ainsworth's salamander is a very attenuated Plethodon with short limbs. It has 16 costal grooves, counting a Y-shaped groove in the groin as two grooves, and four to six costal folds between adpressed limbs. Its peritoneum is not distinctively pigmented. It has 40 premaxillary/maxillary teeth, and palatine teeth in a large median patch, 12 teeth wide and 18 teeth long. Vomerine teeth are in two well-separated, arc-shaped rows, with eight to 10 teeth each. As with all Plethodon species, this one has four digits on the manus and five on the pes, a cylindrical tail without any basal constriction, and a tongue attached in the front.

In preservative, the specimens are dark blackish-brown without any noticeable pattern, and the peritoneum lacks any distinctive pigmentation.

== Taxonomy ==
The holotype and paratype were collected by Jackson Harold Ainsworth as Plethodon glutinosus in 1964, and described as a new species, Plethodon ainsworthi, by James Lazell in 1998. No other specimens are known, and the precise collection locality is unknown. The holotype is damaged, the paratype was damaged so strongly that it is now lost. The distinctive features of this species, however, may result from long-term, improper preservation, suggesting that it is not a valid taxon. P. mississippi exists in the area where P. ainsworthi is believed to have been collected.

== Habitat and conservation ==
Its natural habitats were temperate forests and freshwater springs. Reasons for its extinction are unknown, but likely involved habitat loss via deforestation.
