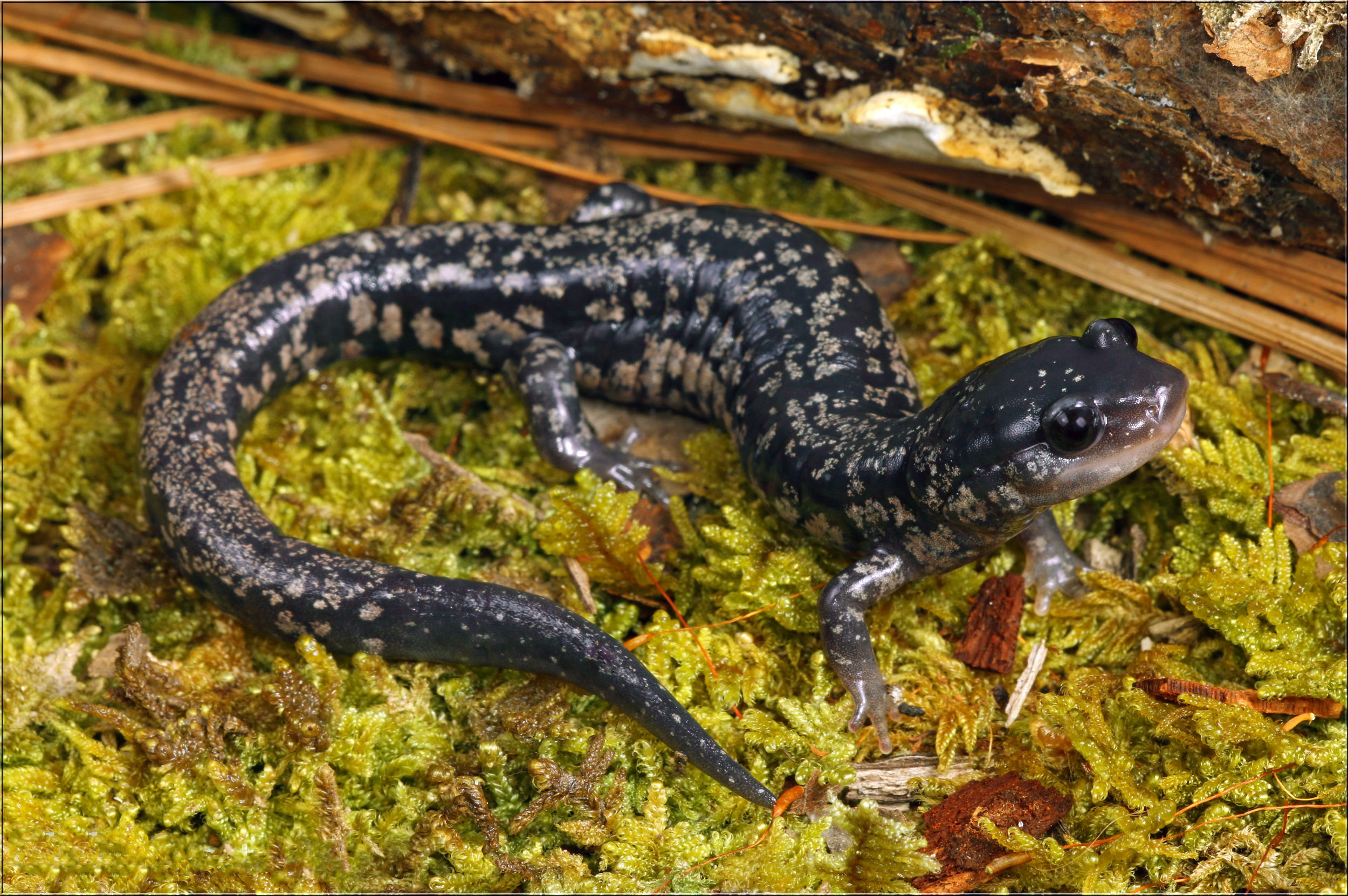

Conservation status
- Data Deficient (IUCN 3.1)

- Imperiled (NatureServe)

Scientific classification
- Kingdom: Animalia
- Phylum: Chordata
- Class: Amphibia
- Order: Urodela
- Family: Plethodontidae
- Genus: Plethodon
- Species: P. savannah

Binomial name
- Plethodon savannah Highton, 1989

= Savannah slimy salamander =

Species of salamander

The Savannah slimy salamander (Plethodon savannah) is a species of salamander in the family Plethodontidae. It is endemic to the state of Georgia in the United States, where it is restricted to the Atlantic coastal plain in Burke, Jefferson, and Richmond counties. This distribution reaches its eastern limit at the Savannah River. Its natural habitat is bottomland hardwood forest. Population analysis indicates a precipitous decline in the population of this species, and it is becoming extirpated in many areas due to development; for example, the habitat at the type locality of this species was partially destroyed by a housing development.
