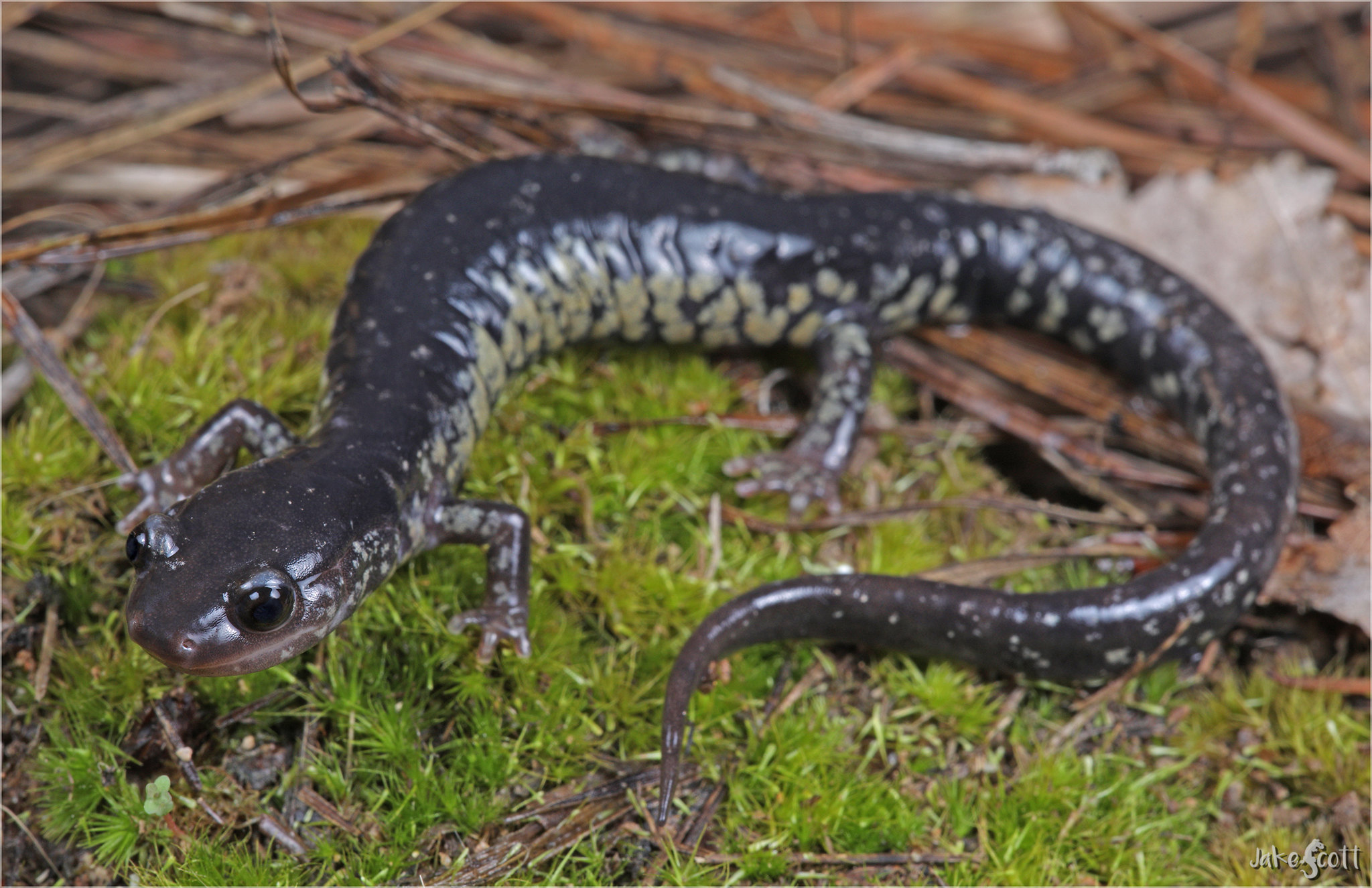

Conservation status
- Secure (NatureServe)

Scientific classification
- Kingdom: Animalia
- Phylum: Chordata
- Class: Amphibia
- Order: Urodela
- Family: Plethodontidae
- Genus: Plethodon
- Species: P. mississippi

Binomial name
- Plethodon mississippi (Highton, 1989)

= Mississippi slimy salamander =

Species of amphibian

The Mississippi slimy salamander (Plethodon mississippi) is a species of terrestrial plethodontid salamander found throughout most of the U.S. state of Mississippi, western Alabama, western Tennessee, far western Kentucky, and eastern Louisiana. The Mississippi slimy salamander is part of the larger slimy salamander (P. glutinosus) complex.

== Description ==
The Mississippi slimy salamander is generally black in color with white, silver, or bronze spots on its back. Adults reach lengths of 12 cm (4.7 in) and breed from August to early September. Females remain with their clutches (about 17 eggs) for up to two weeks before the offspring disperse.
