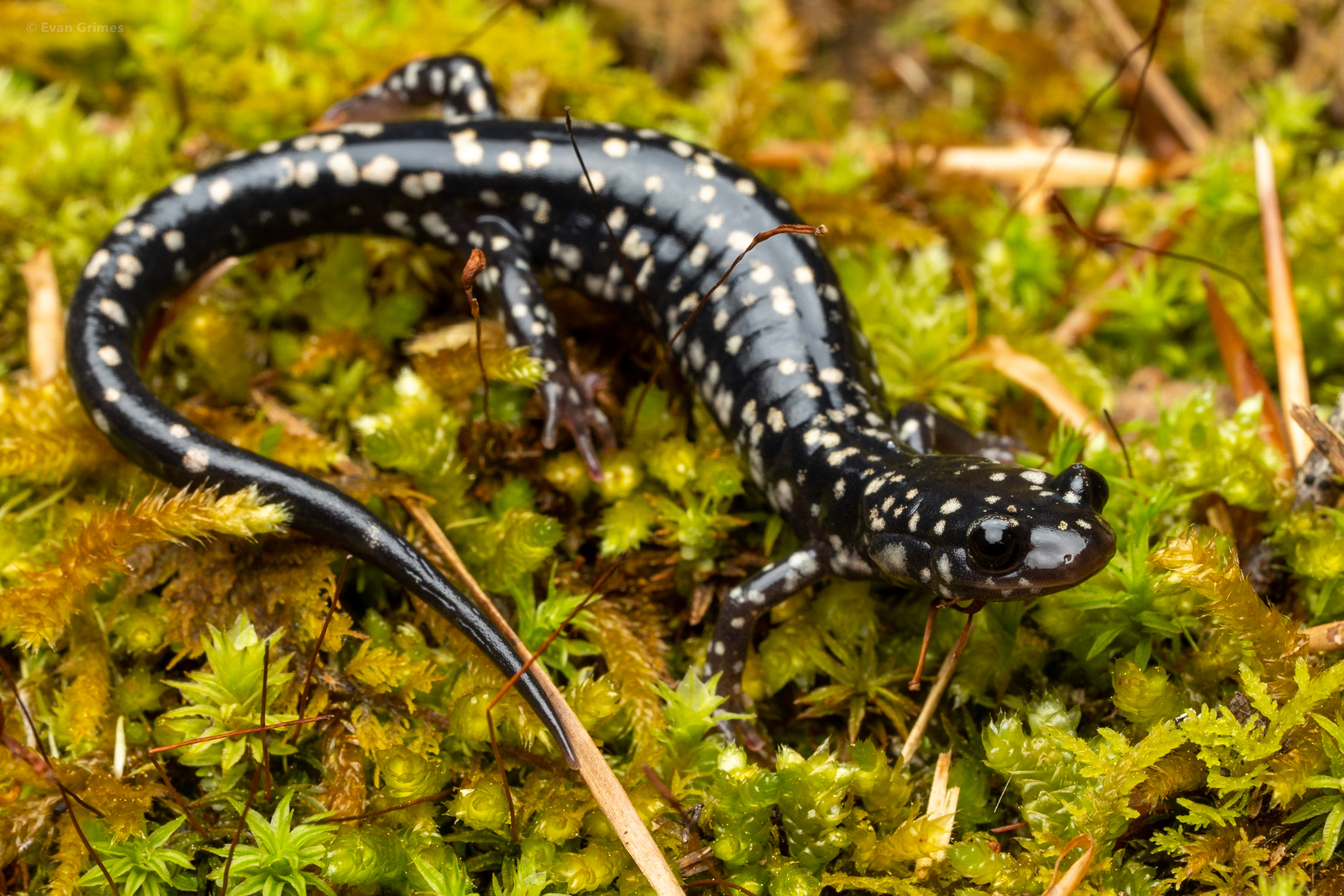

Conservation status
- Least Concern (IUCN 3.1)

Scientific classification
- Kingdom: Animalia
- Phylum: Chordata
- Class: Amphibia
- Order: Urodela
- Family: Plethodontidae
- Genus: Plethodon
- Species: P. kisatchie

Binomial name
- Plethodon kisatchie Highton, 1989

= Louisiana slimy salamander =

Species of amphibian

The Louisiana slimy salamander (Plethodon kisatchie) is a species of salamander in the family Plethodontidae. It is endemic to the United States where it is only known from northern Louisiana and southern Arkansas. Its natural habitat is hardwood forests. Little is known about this species, but it appears to be common within its range with some populations likely impacted by deforestation.
