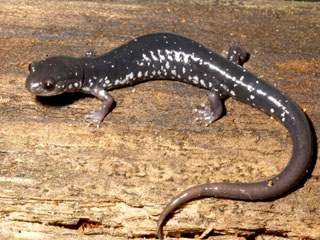

Conservation status
- Least Concern (IUCN 3.1)

Scientific classification
- Kingdom: Animalia
- Phylum: Chordata
- Class: Amphibia
- Order: Urodela
- Family: Plethodontidae
- Genus: Plethodon
- Species: P. teyahalee

Binomial name
- Plethodon teyahalee Highton, 1983

Synonyms
- Plethodon oconaluftee Hairston, 1993

= Southern Appalachian salamander =

Species of amphibian

The southern Appalachian salamander (Plethodon teyahalee) is a species of salamander in the family Plethodontidae. This species also belongs in the Plethodon Glutinosus complex, which is also known as the group of Lungless Slimy Salamanders in the Eastern United States.

== Description ==
The Southern Appalachian Salamander, P. teyahalee, is a large black salamander with very small dorsal white spots and larger lateral white spots. Females also tend to be larger than males, which assists them in carrying eggs. The belly of this species is usually a slate gray, and the chin is usually a lighter coloration than the belly. They can reach sizes between 7 and 17 cm (4.75 in to 6.75 in). They have about 16 costal grooves on their lateral side.

== Distribution ==
P. teyahalee is endemic to the southern Appalachian Mountains in the southeastern United States, where it is found in small portions of North Georgia, northwestern South Carolina, west of the French Broad River in western North Carolina, and smaller areas of eastern Tennessee, including parts of the Great Smoky Mountains. The salamander's altitudinal range extends to 1,550 m. Its natural habitat is temperate Appalachian forests.

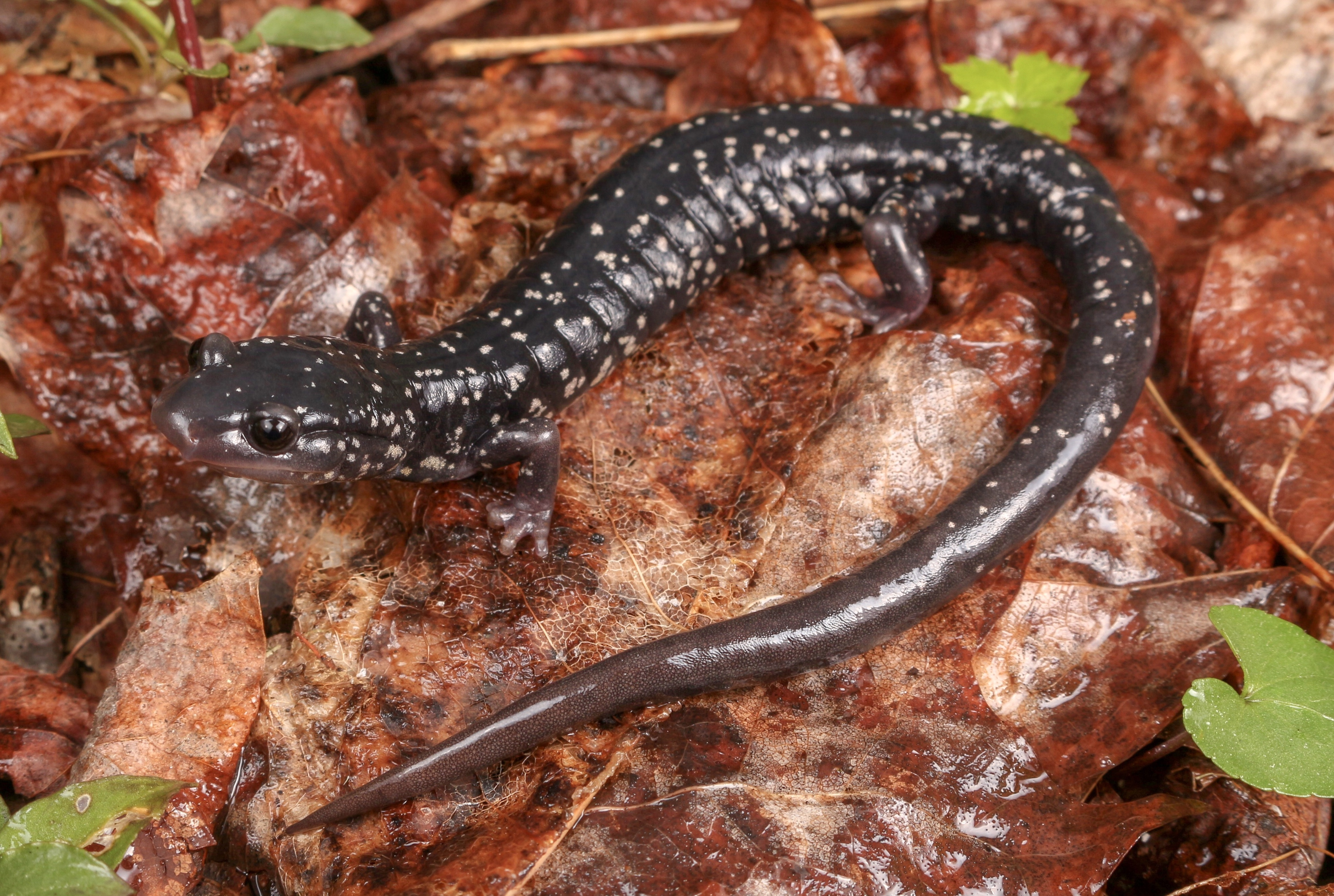
Southern Appalachian salamander found under a rock next to a mountain stream in North Carolina

== Habitat Association ==
P. teyahalee is found at low elevations in moist deciduous forests and woodlands. They tend to stay at these elevations because species at higher elevations are more aggressive and push them down the mountains, preventing them from taking over.

As generalists, they can thrive in a variety of environments with differing moisture and temperature levels. This adaptability, along with their resilience to threats like logging and habitat disturbances, helps them survive in changing conditions. They forage and reproduce on the forest floor before seeking refuge in moist microhabitats, cover objects, or retreat holes once dehydration starts. Individuals in their endemic areas had multiple retreat holes, unlike other species. This suggests that P. teyahalee may live in drier areas, requiring more frequent escapes to prevent drying out.

== Reproduction ==
P. teyahalee repopulates with other individuals around their respective elevations. They also participate in hybridization at different elevations, a behavior studied in Plethodon species since Hairston and Highton's work over 50 years ago. Hybridization occurs when two different species produce offspring with traits from both parents. P. teyahalee often hybridizes with high-elevation species like the Red-Legged Salamander, P. shermani, and Cheoah Bald Salamanders, P. cheoah. An example would be where the red legs from P. shermani pass over, as well as the white spots from P. teyahalee onto the offspring.
