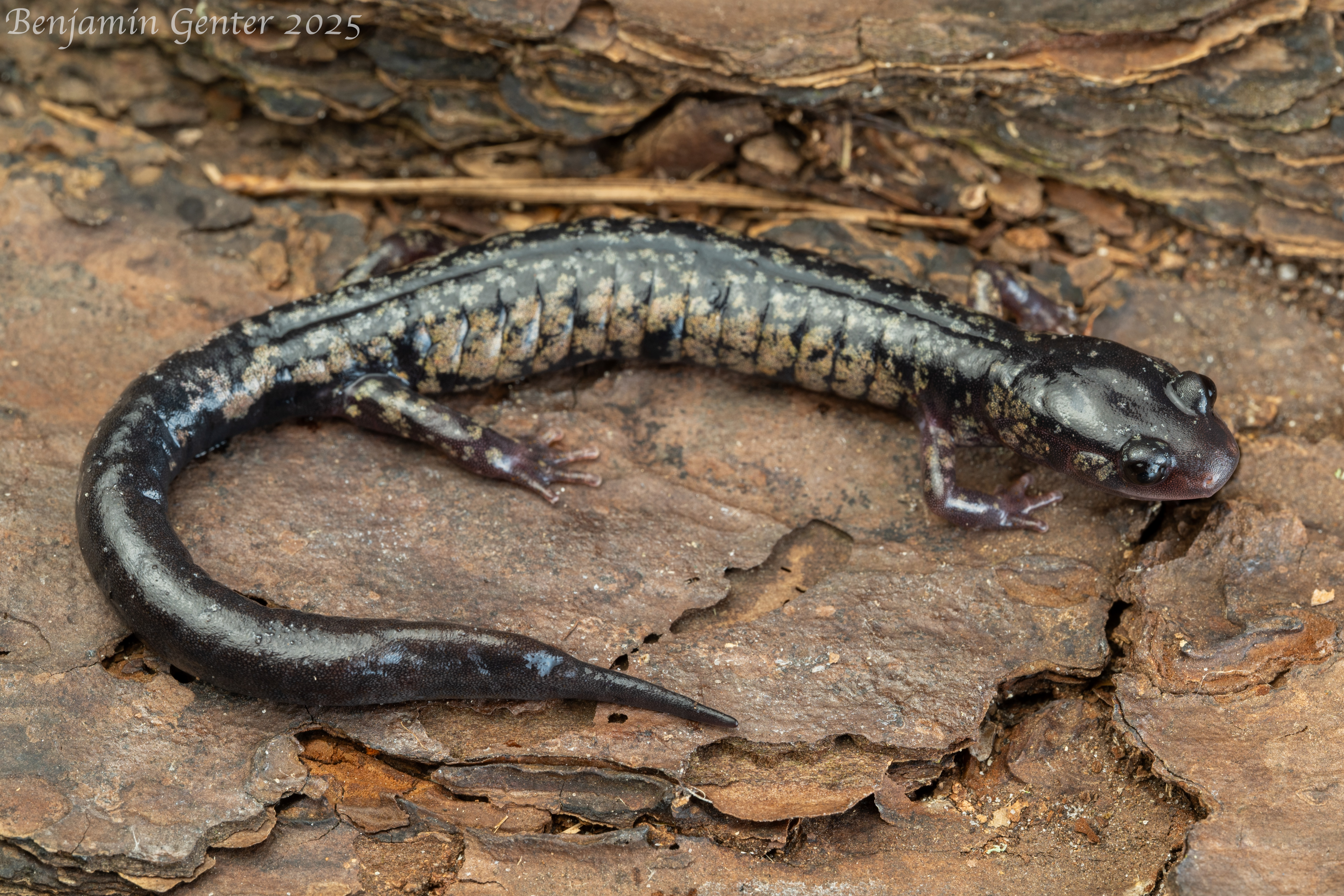

Scientific classification
- Kingdom: Animalia
- Phylum: Chordata
- Class: Amphibia
- Order: Urodela
- Family: Plethodontidae
- Genus: Plethodon
- Species: P. variolatus

Binomial name
- Plethodon variolatus Gilliams, 1818

= South Carolina slimy salamander =

Species of salamander

The South Carolina slimy salamander (Plethodon variolatus) is a species of salamander in the family Plethodontidae. It is endemic to the south-eastern United States, where it is restricted to a small portion of the Atlantic coastal plain from South Carolina to extreme south-eastern Georgia. Its natural habitats are mixed forests, bottomland hardwood forests, and longleaf pine savannas.
