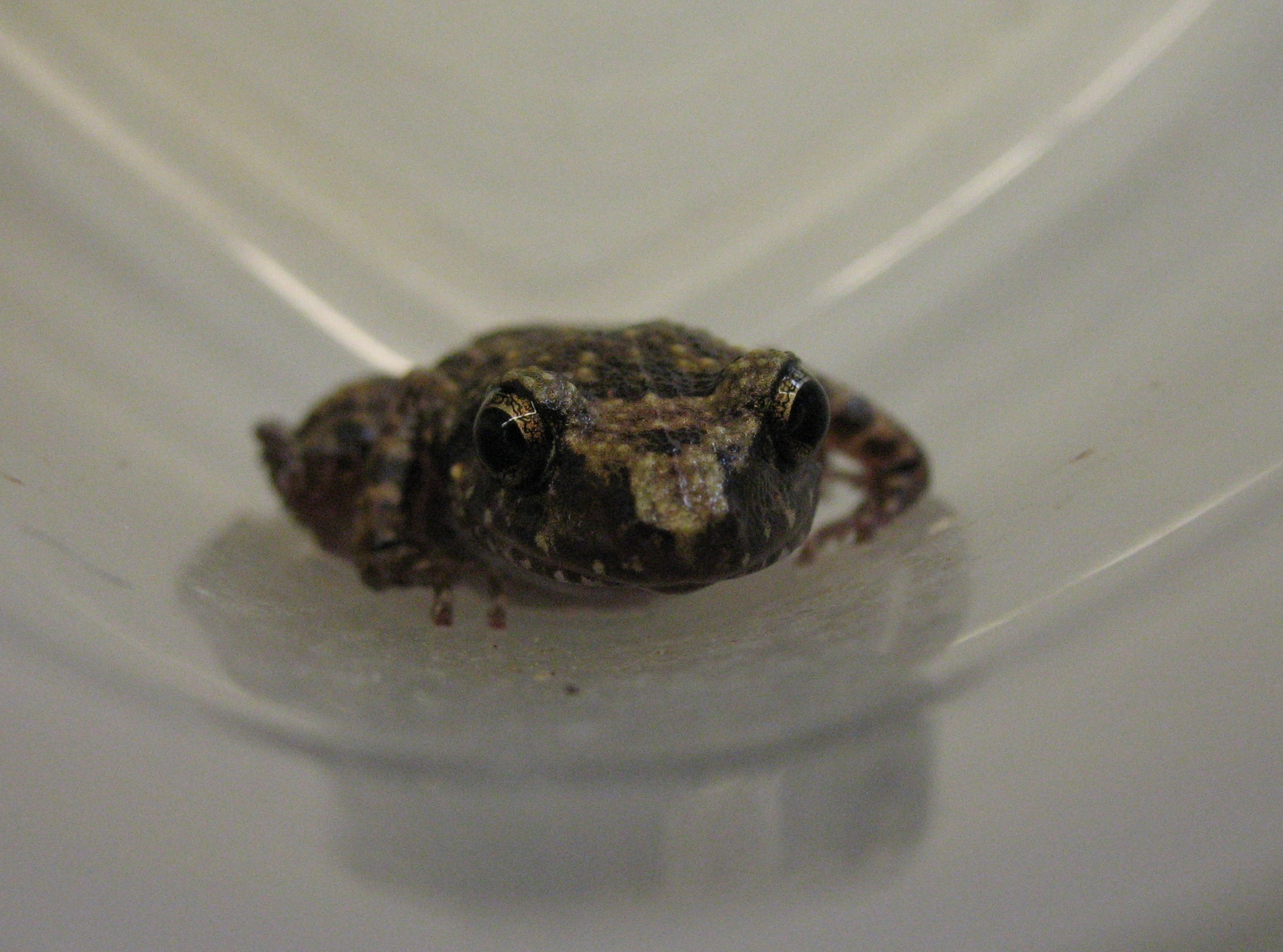

Conservation status
- Least Concern (IUCN 3.1)

- Secure (NatureServe)

Scientific classification
- Kingdom: Animalia
- Phylum: Chordata
- Class: Amphibia
- Order: Anura
- Clade: Brachycephaloidea
- Family: Eleutherodactylidae
- Genus: Eleutherodactylus
- Subgenus: Syrrhophus
- Species: E. cystignathoides

Binomial name
- Eleutherodactylus cystignathoides (Cope, 1877)

Synonyms
- Phyllobates cystignathoides Cope, 1877; Syrrhophus cystignathoides (Cope, 1877); Syrrhophus campi Stejneger, 1915

= Eleutherodactylus cystignathoides =

Species of amphibian

Eleutherodactylus cystignathoides, also known as the Rio Grande chirping frog, Mexican chirping frog, or lowland chirping frog, is a small eleutherodactylid frog. It is found from the southern United States in Texas, and in the northeastern Mexico in the states of Nuevo León, Tamaulipas, San Luis Potosí, Hidalgo, and Veracruz. Its range in Texas has expanded because of transport in potted plants and has been reported in Louisiana and Georgia.

== Subspecies ==
Two subspecies are sometimes recognized, although they are poorly delineated:

- Eleutherodactylus cystignathoides cystignathoides (Cope, 1877) — Rio Grande chirping frog, Mexican chirping frog
- Eleutherodactylus cystignathoides campi (Stejneger, 1915) — Rio Grande chirping frog, Camp's frog

Only Eleutherodactylus cystignathoides campi occurs in Texas.

== Description ==
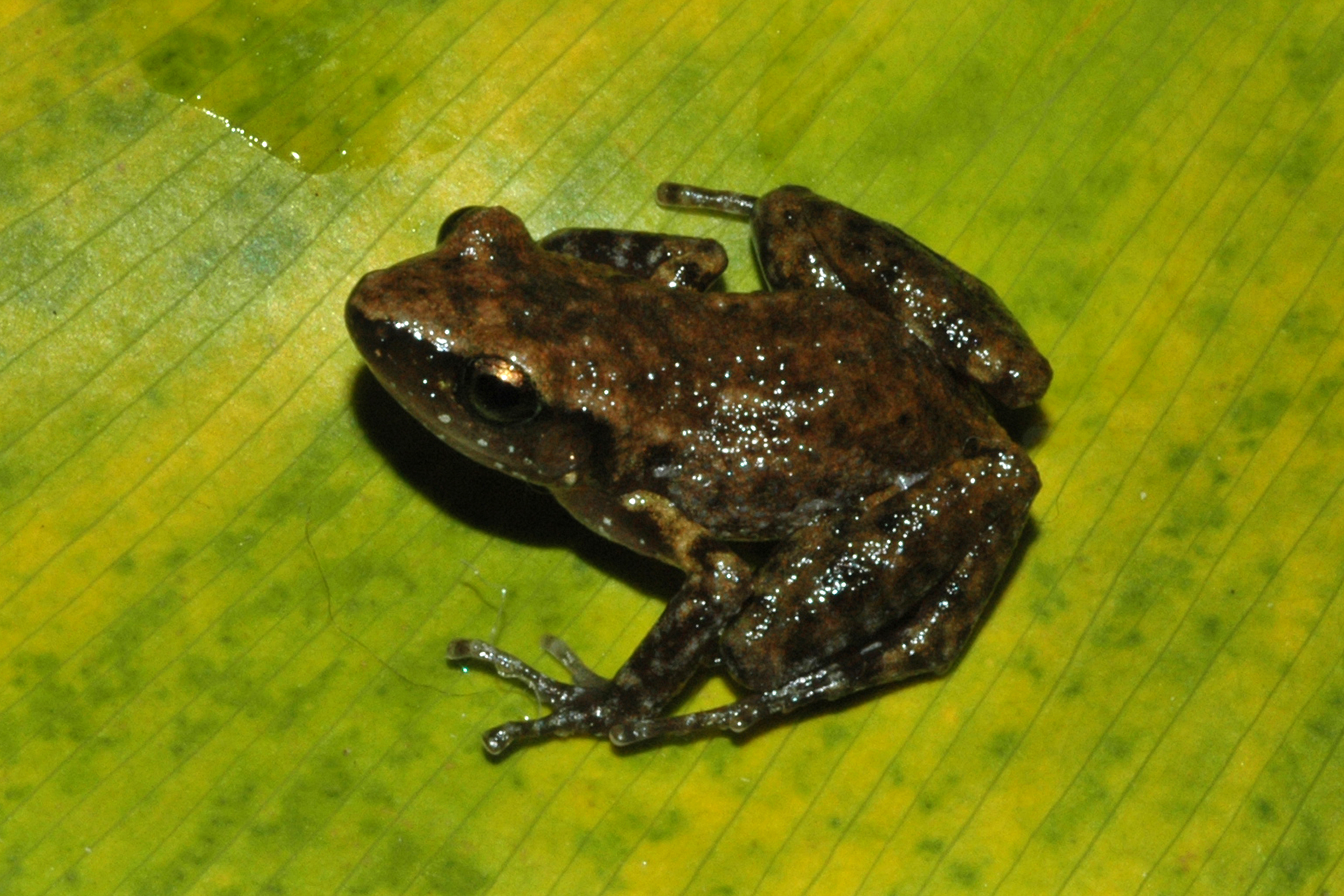
Rio Grande Chirping Frog (Eleutherodactylus cystignathoides), from Liberty County, Texas, USA

Adult males measure 16–24 mm (0.6–0.9 in) and adult females 16–26 mm (0.6–1.0 in) in snout–vent length. The snout is pointed and the body is flat and elongated. Tympanum is visible. The finger tips are slightly expanded. Dorsal skin is weakly pustular, that of venter is smooth to areolate. Dorsal coloration is variable (brown, gray, or yellow-green) and includes dark spots. Ventral skin is translucent. The hind limbs have dark crossbars.

== Behavior ==
Both males and females produce calls, which is rare in anurans. Moreover, male and female calls are remarkably similar. A smaller proportion of females compared to males were observed calling in two Mexican populations. Moreover, calling females were, on average, smaller than non-calling females. The function of female calling is not known, but it might function as an advertisement, similarly as the male calls. Males appear to be territorial.

== Reproduction ==
Reproduction is terrestrial and direct, without a free-living larval stage. Under laboratory conditions, eggs are laid just under the soil surface. Clutch size is 5–13 eggs measuring 3–3.5 mm (0.12–0.14 in) in diameter. The eggs hatch as froglets that measure approximately 5–8.5 mm (0.20–0.33 in).

== Habitat and conservation ==
Eleutherodactylus cystignathoides occurs at low elevation coastal plains and at low to moderate elevations in foothills. Individuals can be found in moist shaded vegetation, palm groves, thickets, ditches, resacas, lawns, and gardens. Many records are from urban settings. They can hide under cover objects during the day. They have been observed to utilize arboreal perches 0.2–1.5 m (7.9–59.1 in) above the ground.

This species is quite common throughout its range and no major threats to it are known; rather, they appear to thrive in the presence of humans. Its Mexican range includes Sierra del Abra-Tamchipa and El Cielo Biosphere.
