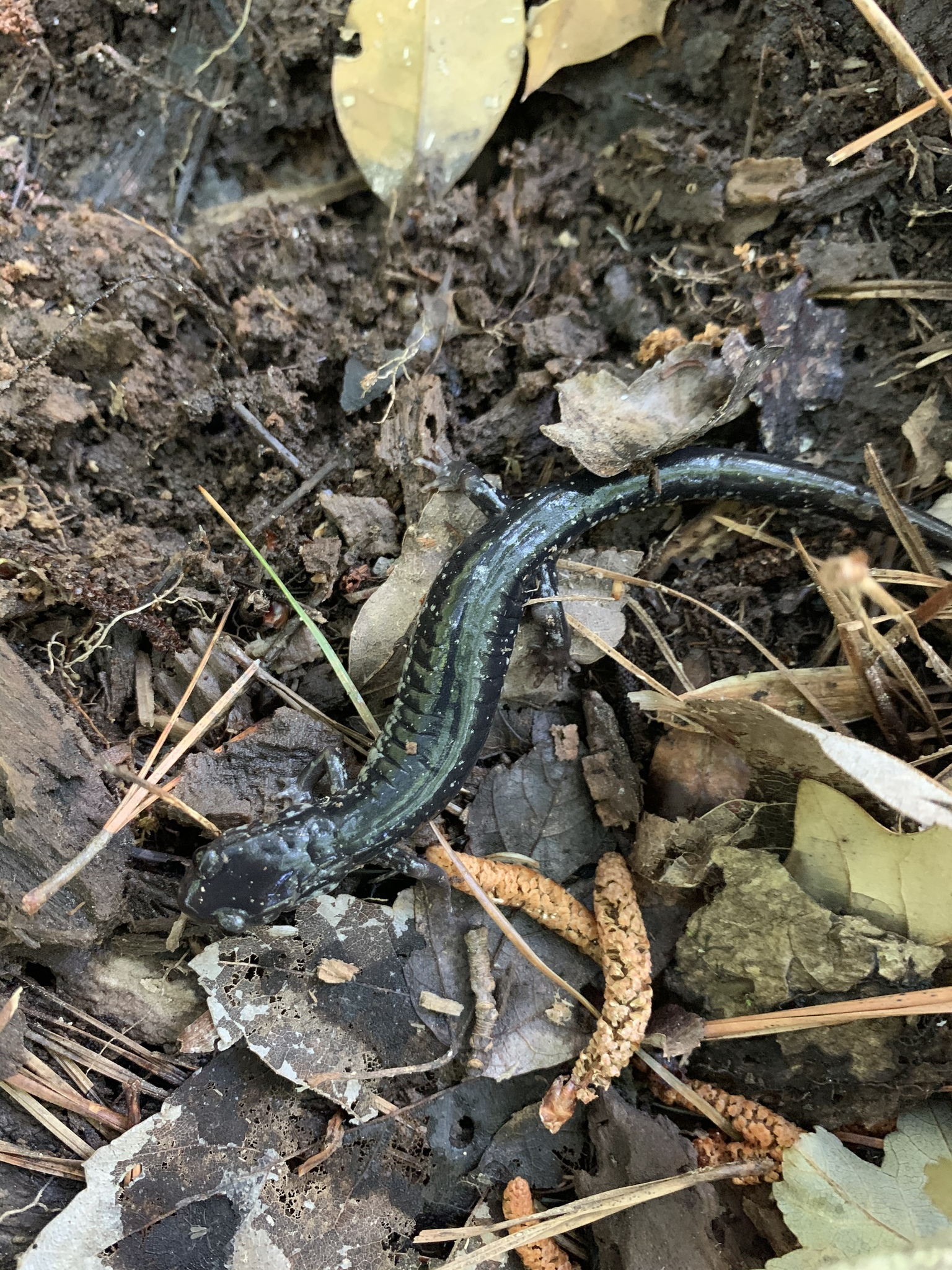

Conservation status
- Secure (NatureServe)

Scientific classification
- Kingdom: Animalia
- Phylum: Chordata
- Class: Amphibia
- Order: Urodela
- Family: Plethodontidae
- Genus: Plethodon
- Species: P. chlorobryonis

Binomial name
- Plethodon chlorobryonis Mittleman, 1951
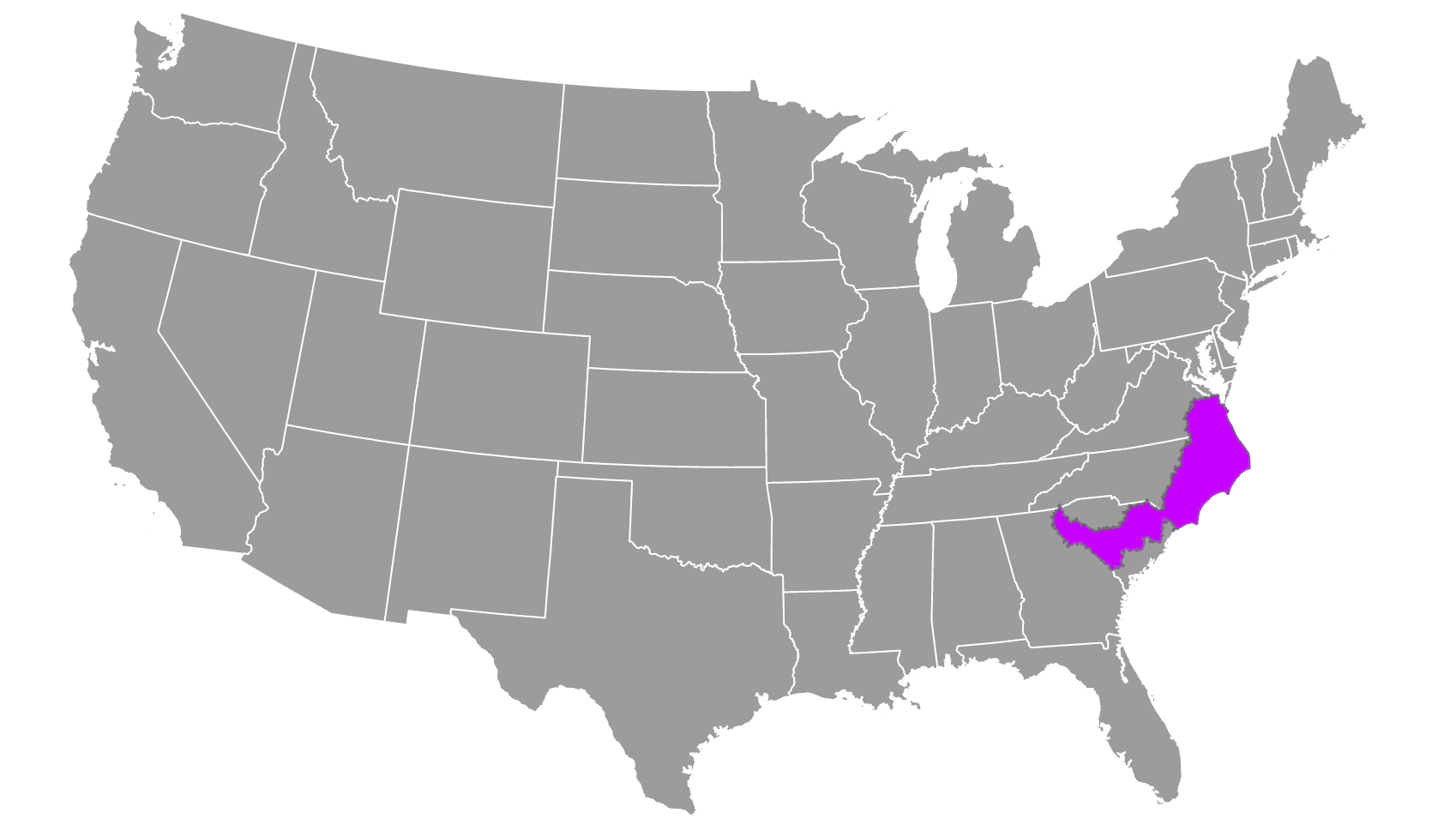
- Atlantic Coast slimy salamander range

= Atlantic Coast slimy salamander =

Species of salamander

The Atlantic Coast slimy salamander (Plethodon chlorobryonis) is a species of salamander in the family Plethodontidae. It is endemic to the United States, where it is distributed throughout the Southeastern United States from southeastern Virginia to northern Georgia. It is largely distributed along the Atlantic coastal plain, although it enters the Piedmont in Virginia and South Carolina and enters the Blue Ridge Mountains in Georgia. Its habitat is largely restricted to bottomland hardwood forest. While its conservation status is considered Secure by NatureServe, declines have been noted in all studied populations.
