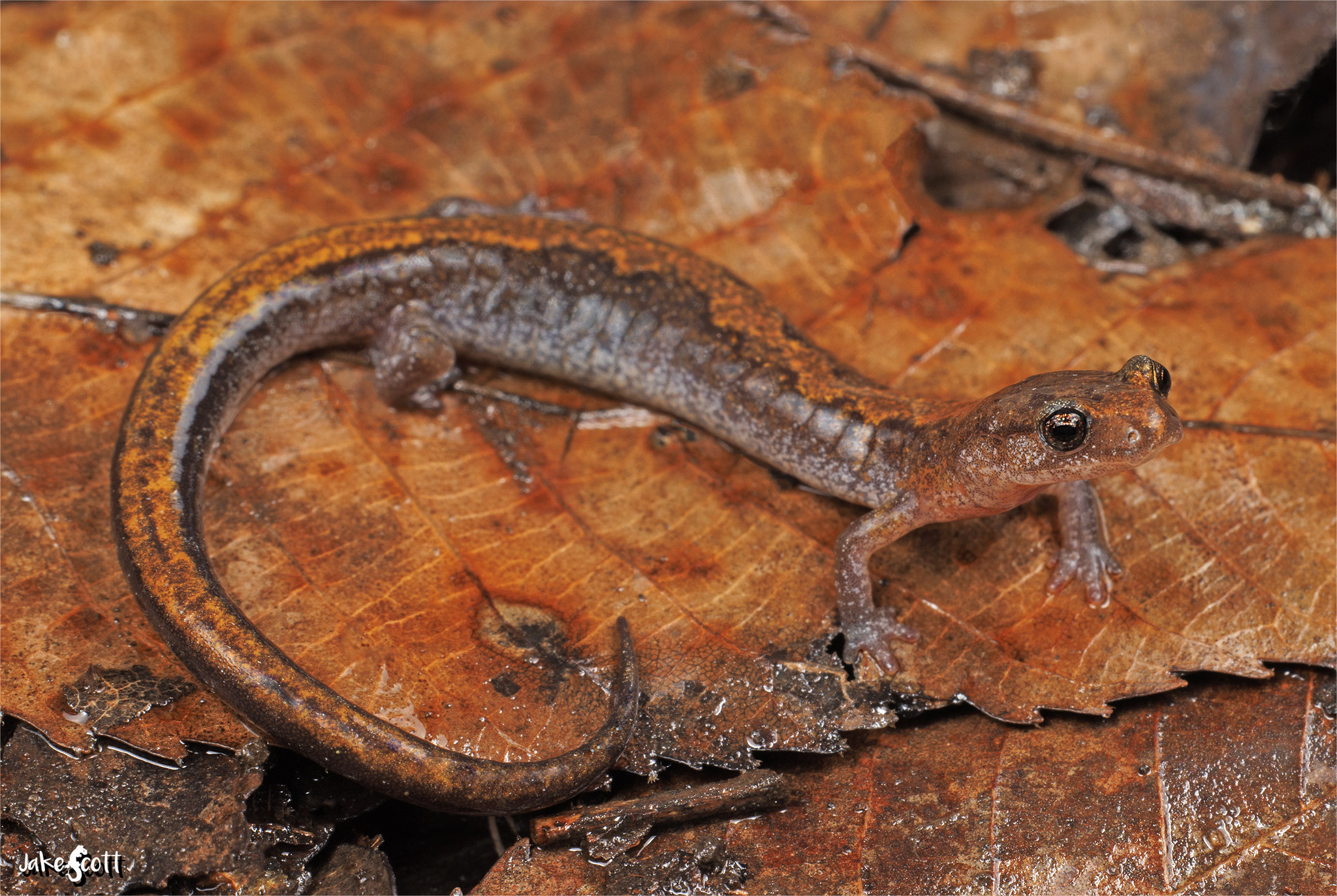

Conservation status
- Least Concern (IUCN 3.1)

Scientific classification
- Kingdom: Animalia
- Phylum: Chordata
- Class: Amphibia
- Order: Urodela
- Family: Plethodontidae
- Genus: Plethodon
- Species: P. dorsalis

Binomial name
- Plethodon dorsalis Cope, 1889

= Northern zigzag salamander =

Species of amphibian

The northern zigzag salamander (Plethodon dorsalis) is a species of salamander in the family Plethodontidae. It is endemic to the eastern United States and has been found in Illinois, Kentucky, Tennessee, Alabama, and Mississippi. The northern zigzag salamander's natural habitat includes temperate forests, rocky areas, and caves. It is threatened by habitat loss.
