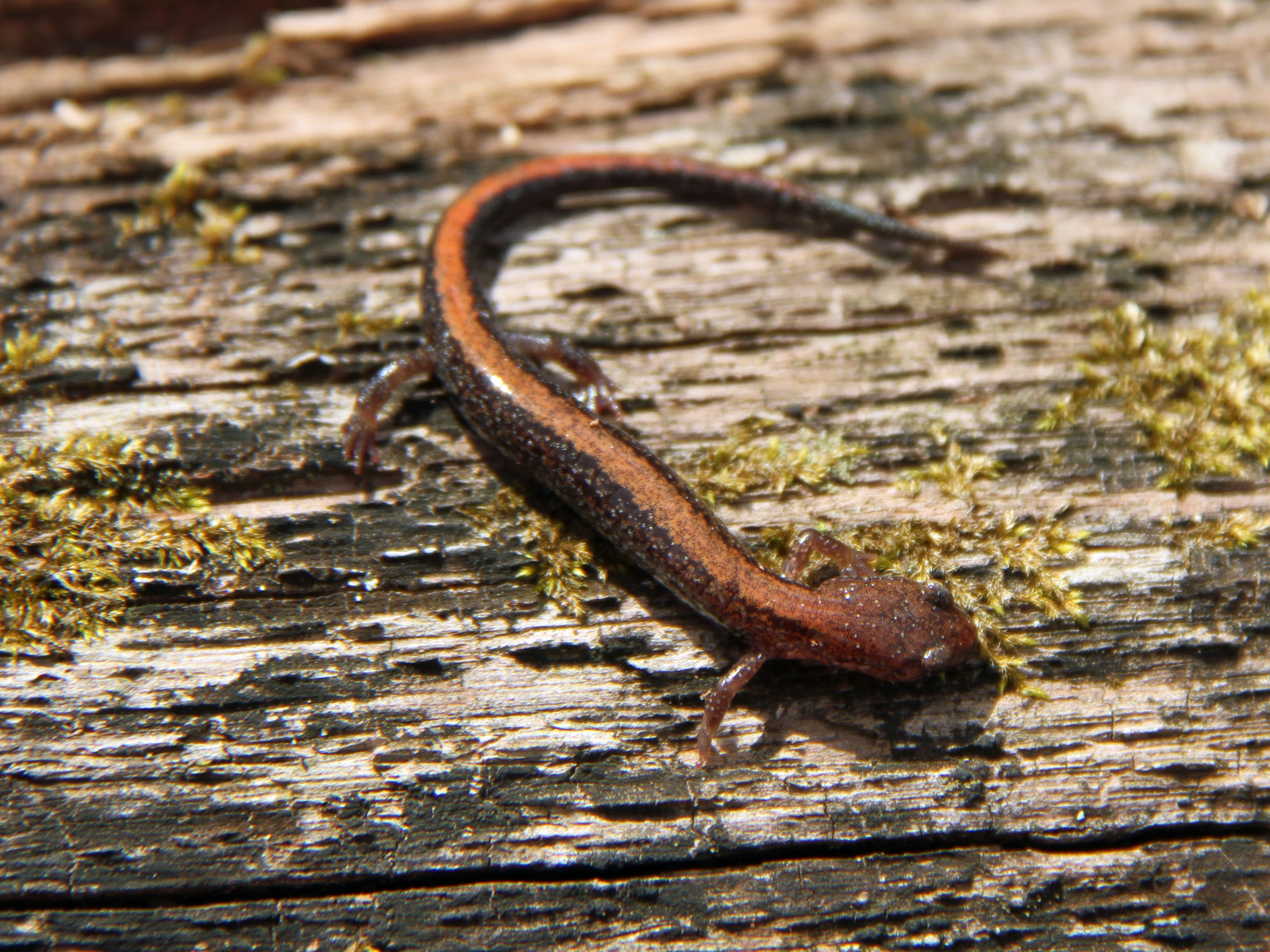

Conservation status
- Least Concern (IUCN 3.1)

Scientific classification
- Kingdom: Animalia
- Phylum: Chordata
- Class: Amphibia
- Order: Urodela
- Family: Plethodontidae
- Genus: Plethodon
- Species: P. serratus

Binomial name
- Plethodon serratus Grobman, 1944

Synonyms
- Plethodon cinereus serratus Grobman, 1944; Plethodon cinereus polycentratus Highton and Grobman, 1956

= Southern red-backed salamander =

Species of amphibian

The southern red-backed salamander (Plethodon serratus) is a species of salamander endemic to the United States. It is found in four widely disjunct populations: one in central Louisiana; one in the Ouachita Mountains of Arkansas and Oklahoma; one in central Missouri; and one from southeastern Tennessee, to southwestern North Carolina, western Georgia, and eastern Alabama. It is sometimes referred to as the Georgia red-backed salamander or the Ouachita red-backed salamander. It was once considered a subspecies of the red-backed salamander, Plethodon cinereus.

== Description ==
The southern red-backed salamander is typically gray or black in color, with a red-brown, fading stripe across the width of its back. It grows from 8 to 11 cm (3 to 4 in) in length. Similar to Plethodon cinereus, Plethodon serratus comes in several atypical color variations. The typical red backed phase with a red dorsal stripe consists of most individuals. The atypical variations include a lead backed phase with a dark grey stripe, a silver back phase with a light grey dorsal stripe, hypomelanistic (leucistic) variations of the red backed form, and the rare white backed, or ghost phase. Unlike P. cinereus, P. serratus has not yet been found to have an erythristic variation.

== Behavior ==
Mostly nocturnal, it is often found under ground debris in moist, forested areas. In dry seasons, it moves closer to permanent water sources. Its primary diet is small arthropods and mollusks.
