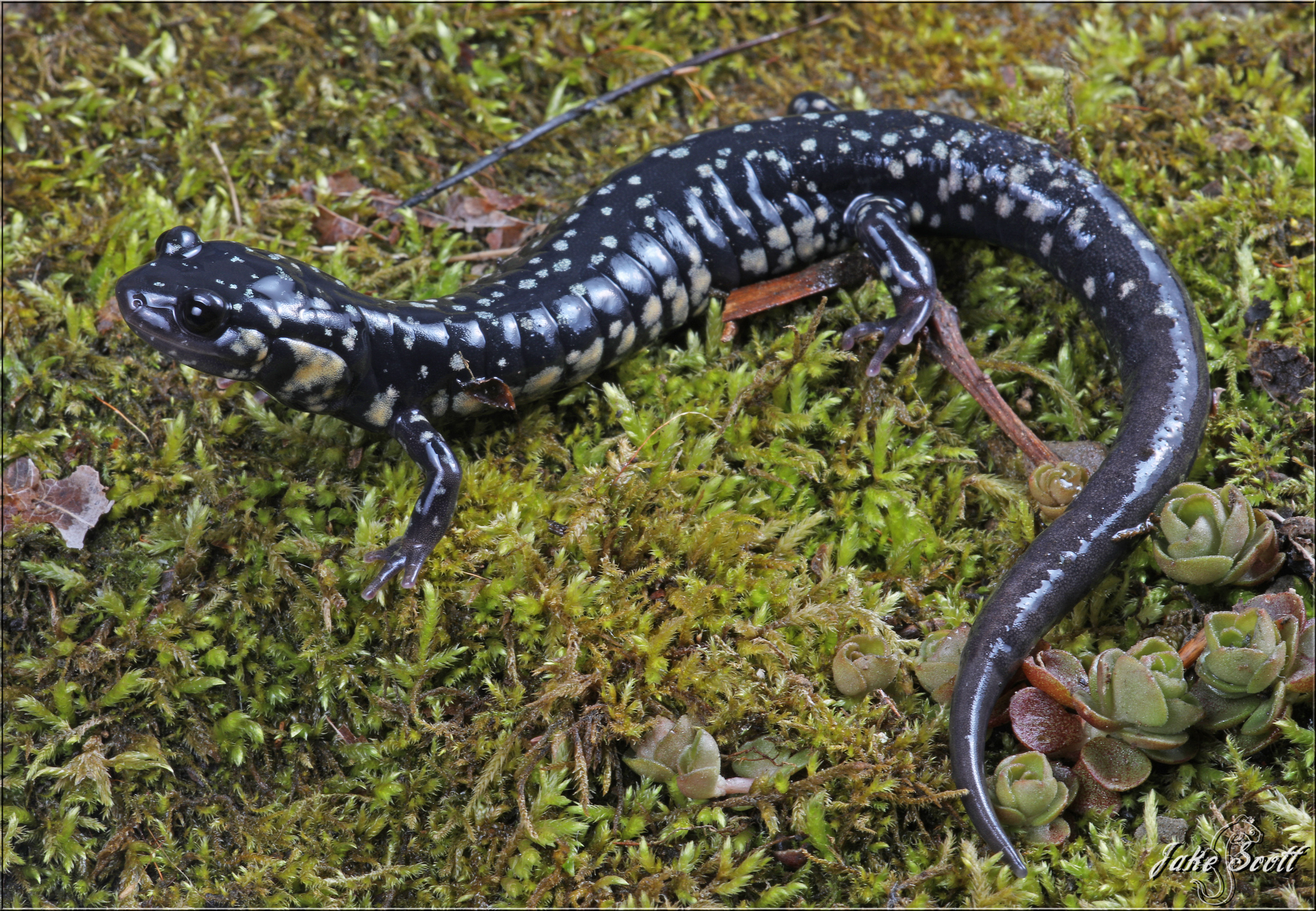

Conservation status
- Least Concern (IUCN 3.1)

Scientific classification
- Kingdom: Animalia
- Phylum: Chordata
- Class: Amphibia
- Order: Urodela
- Family: Plethodontidae
- Genus: Plethodon
- Species: P. glutinosus

Binomial name
- Plethodon glutinosus (Green, 1818)

Synonyms
- Salamandra glutinosa Green, 1818; Cylindrosoma glutinosum — A.M.C. Duméril, Bibron & A.H.A. Duméril, 1854; Plethodon variolosum A.M.C. Duméril, Bibron & A.H.A. Duméril, 1854; Salamandra elongata A.M.C. Duméril, Bibron & A.H.A. Duméril, 1854; Salamandra melanoleuca Wied-Neuwied, 1865; Amblystoma melanoleuca — Boulenger, 1882; Cylindrosoma albopunctata A.M.C. Duméril, Bibron & A.H.A. Duméril, 1854

= Northern slimy salamander =

Species of amphibian

The northern slimy salamander (Plethodon glutinosus) is a species of terrestrial plethodontid salamander found throughout much of the eastern two-thirds of the United States.

== Common names ==
The northern slimy salamander is called "slimy" because it produces sticky slime from glands on its lower back and tail in order to defend itself from predators. It is also sometimes referred to as the viscid salamander, grey-spotted salamander, slippery salamander, or sticky salamander, depending on which source is consulted.

== Description ==
The northern slimy salamander is typically an overall black in color, with numerous silvery spots or gold spots across its back. It is usually 12–17 cm (4.7–6.7 in) in total length (including tail), but can grow to 20.6 cm (8.1 in). Males are not easily distinguished from females, though females tend to be slightly larger. It has 15-17 costal grooves.

== Taxonomy ==
P. glutinosus is one of 57 species in the genus Plethodon and was one of the first of its cogeners to be described. The northern slimy salamander is one of 14 species within the Plethodon glutinosus complex. Species within this complex are very similar but vary in habitat range, body size, shape, and proportions.

== Geographic range ==
P. glutinosus is found from New York, west to Illinois, south to Mississippi, and east to Alabama, with isolated populations in southern New Hampshire and northwestern Connecticut.

== Habitat ==
P. glutinosus is highly associated with moist undisturbed woodlands, and ravines. P. glutinosus can also be found in caves and will seasonally retreat deeper into them when aboveground conditions are unideal. The salamander is typically located on the underside of debris such as logs and stones during the day. P. glutinosus will emerge from debris on moist nights. They can be found in areas of secondary succession in old growth deciduous or hemlock forests with steep, rocky slopes. They prefer hiding under rotten logs and in decomposed organic matter like layers of duff on the forest floor. They can typically be found near a water source or in a moist area. One study found that the clear-cutting of forests greatly reduces population numbers in the given area, where it takes 13 years for the population to return to half of what it was before the clear-cutting.

== Life history and behavior ==
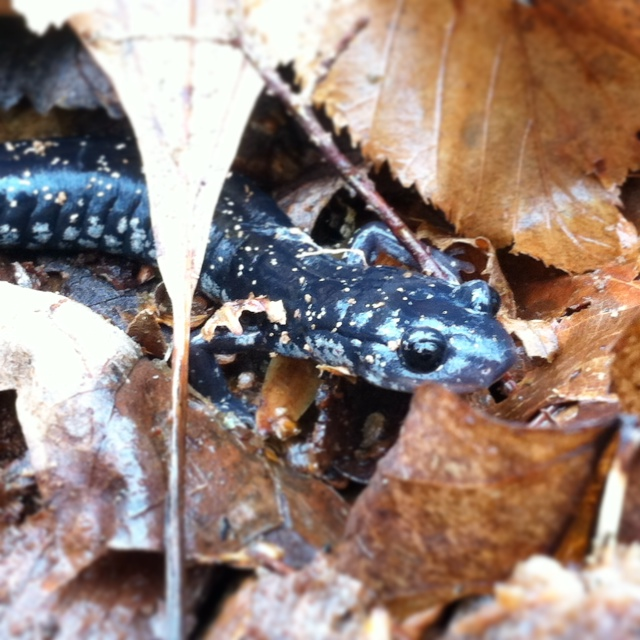
A northern slimy salamander in Great Smoky Mountains National Park, Tennessee

=== Behavior ===
All plethodontid salamanders are territorial, and fight aggressively for territory. Their preferred habitat is in moist soil or leaf litter beneath stones, rotting logs, or other debris near a permanent water source. They sometimes make use of other animals' burrows. As their name suggests, slimy salamanders produce significant amounts of skin secretions that are highly adhesive. These adhesives bind to predators and can compromise both mastication and locomotion. Whenever threatened they will thrash their tail, exposing the glands that secrete this sticky substance.

=== Reproduction ===
Females reach sexual maturity in the second year of life and do not lay eggs until the third year. Breeding of P. glutinosus takes place in the spring and is terrestrial. Courtship consists of the males performing a sort of dance to attract the females' attention. Females lay clutches of four to twelve eggs in a moist area, which she guards, often neglecting food for the period until they hatch. Hatchlings emerge from the eggs in about three months, having no aquatic stage, like many other salamander species. They instead develop directly into their entirely terrestrial adult form. After hatching, young individuals show high growth rates during the summer months and little to no growth during the winter.

=== Diet ===
Not much is known about the diet of the slimy salamanders, but it is believed that the species exhibit opportunistic feeding strategies where they consume prey that is easily accessible. One study surveyed the digestive systems of this species and found that ants, bees, wasps, beetles, sowbugs, snails, and earthworms occurred most frequently.
