= Richard Highton =

American zoologist (1927–2025)

- Born: December 24, 1927
- Died: February 19, 2025 (aged 97)
- Education: University of Florida
- Known for: His research in herpetology
- Scientific career
- Fields: Biology
- Workplaces: University of Maryland, College Park
- Thesis: On the relationships of the salamanders of the genus Plethodon (1956)
- Doctoral students: Stephen Blair Hedges

Richard Highton (December 24, 1927 – February 19, 2025) was an American herpetologist, an expert on the biological classification of woodland salamanders.

== Background ==
Highton was born in Chicago. His father encouraged his son to have an interest in herpetology. In 1950 he was awarded a bachelor's degree in biology, mathematics and sociology from New York University, with his studies interrupted by military service. He received his master's degree and Doctorate in Philosophy from the University of Florida.

In 1950 he married Anne Adams and they had four children together. Highton died on February 19, 2025, at the age of 97.

== Career ==
A field visit to the southern Appalachians mountains in 1948 with Carl Gans was the start of his work on salamanders. In 1956 he joined the Zoology Department University of Maryland College Park, with emphasis on genetics and was Professor Emeritus in Biology. On his retirement in 1998, his collection of approximately 140,000 salamander specimens was donated to the Smithsonian Institution.

Since 1999 he has been a member of the Committee on Standard and English Scientific Names for North American Amphibians and Reptiles. He is the author or co-author of over 90 scientific publications.

== Honours and awards ==
He was president of the American Society of Ichthyologists and Herpetologists in 1976 and President of the University of the Maryland Chapter of Sigma Xi from 1979 to 1980. The intestinal parasite of salamanders Isospora hightoni was named in his honour.
