= List of threatened reptiles and amphibians of the United States =

According to the International Union for Conservation of Nature (IUCN), 93 reptile and amphibian species in the United States are threatened with extinction. The IUCN has classified each of these species into one of three conservation statuses: vulnerable VU, endangered EN, and critically endangered CR.

== Order Crocodilia (crocodilians) ==
Family Crocodylidae (crocodiles)

- American crocodile (Crocodylus acutus) VU^{IUCN}

== Order Testudines (turtles) ==
Family Chelydridae (snapping turtles)

- Alligator snapping turtle (Macrochelys temminckii) VU^{IUCN}

Family Kinosternidae (mud turtles and musk turtles)

- Flattened musk turtle (Sternotherus depressus) CR^{IUCN}

Family Emydidae (pond turtles)

- Spotted turtle (Clemmys guttata) EN^{IUCN}
- Bog turtle (Glyptemys muhlenbergii) CR^{IUCN}
- Wood turtle (Glyptemys insculpta) EN^{IUCN}
- Common box turtle (Terrapene carolina) VU^{IUCN}
- Blanding's turtle (Emys blandingii) EN^{IUCN}
- Western pond turtle (Actinemys marmorata) VU^{IUCN}
- Barbour's map turtle (Graptemys barbouri) VU^{IUCN}
- Cagle's map turtle (Graptemys caglei) EN^{IUCN}
- Yellow-blotched map turtle (Graptemys flavimaculata) VU^{IUCN}
- Pascagoula map turtle (Graptemys gibbonsi) EN^{IUCN}
  - Pearl River map turtle (Graptemys pearlensis) EN, species not recognized by SSAR
- Ringed map turtle (Graptemys oculifera) VU^{IUCN}
- Big Bend slider (Trachemys gaigeae) VU^{IUCN}
- Alabama red-bellied cooter (Pseudemys alabamensis) EN^{IUCN}

Family Testudinidae (tortoises)

- Gopher tortoise (Gopherus polyphemus) VU^{IUCN}
- Desert tortoise (Gopherus agassizii) VU^{IUCN}

Family Cheloniidae (sea turtles)

- Loggerhead sea turtle (Caretta caretta) VU^{IUCN}
- Green sea turtle (Chelonia mydas) EN^{IUCN} (Hawaiian subpopulation: LC^{IUCN})
- Hawksbill sea turtle (Eretmochelys imbricata) CR^{IUCN}
- Kemp's ridley sea turtle (Lepidochelys kempii) CR^{IUCN}
- Olive ridley sea turtle (Lepidochelys olivacea) VU^{IUCN}

Family Dermochelyidae (leatherback sea turtle)

- Leatherback sea turtle (Dermochelys coriacea) VU^{IUCN} (East Pacific Ocean subpopulation - i.e. Hawaiian Is.: CR^{IUCN}, West Pacific Ocean subpopulation: CR^{IUCN}, Northwest Atlantic Ocean subpopulation: EN^{IUCN})

Family Trionychidae (softshells)

- Wattle-necked softshell turtle (Palea steindachneri) (introduced) CR^{IUCN}

== Order Squamata (scaled reptiles) ==
Family Crotaphytidae (collared lizards)

- Reticulated collared lizard (Crotaphytus reticulatus) VU^{IUCN}
- Blunt-nosed leopard lizard (Gambelia sila) EN^{IUCN}

Family Phrynosomatidae (horned lizards and spiny lizards)

- Dunes sagebrush lizard (Sceloporus arenicolus) VU^{IUCN}
- Coachella Valley fringe-toed lizard (Uma inornata) EN^{IUCN}

Family Teiidae (whiptails)

- Little white whiptail (Aspidoscelis gypsi) VU^{IUCN}

Family Scincidae (skinks)

- Florida sand skink (Neoseps reynoldsi) VU^{IUCN}

Family Xantusiidae (night lizards)

- Sandstone night lizard (Xantusia gracilis) VU^{IUCN}

Family Anguidae (glass lizards, alligator lizards, and relatives)

- Panamint alligator lizard (Elgaria panamintina) VU^{IUCN}

Family Colubridae (colubrid snakes)

- Southern hog-nosed snake (Heterodon simus) VU^{IUCN}
- Louisiana pine snake (Pituophis ruthveni) EN^{IUCN}
- Rim rock crown snake (Tantilla oolitica) EN^{IUCN}
- Giant garter snake (Thamnophis gigas) VU^{IUCN}

== Order Caudata (salamanders) ==
Family Proteidae (waterdogs)

- Alabama waterdog (Necturus alabamensis) EN^{IUCN}

Family Ambystomatidae (mole salamanders)

- Reticulated flatwoods salamander (Ambystoma bishopi) VU^{IUCN}
- California tiger salamander (Ambystoma californiense) VU^{IUCN}
- Frosted flatwoods salamander (Ambystoma cingulatum) VU^{IUCN}

Family Rhyacotritonidae (torrent salamanders)

- Olympic torrent salamander (Rhyacotriton olympicus) VU^{IUCN}

Family Salamandridae (newts)

- Black-spotted newt (Notophthalmus meridionalis) EN^{IUCN}

Family Plethodontidae (lungless salamanders)

- Inyo Mountains salamander (Batrachoseps campi) EN^{IUCN}
- Kings River slender salamander (Batrachoseps regius) VU^{IUCN}
- Kern Canyon slender salamander (Batrachoseps simatus) VU^{IUCN}
- Tehachapi slender salamander (Batrachoseps stebbinsi) VU^{IUCN}
- Oregon slender salamander (Batrachoseps wrightorum) VU^{IUCN}
- Red Hills salamander (Phaeognathus hubrichti) EN^{IUCN}
- Peaks of Otter salamander (Plethodon hubrichti) VU^{IUCN}
- Shenandoah salamander (Plethodon shenandoah) VU^{IUCN}
- Weller's salamander (Plethodon welleri) EN^{IUCN}
- Pigeon Mountain salamander (Plethodon petraeus) VU^{IUCN}
- Blue Ridge gray-cheeked salamander (Plethodon amplus) VU^{IUCN}
- Scott Bar salamander (Plethodon asupak) VU^{IUCN}
- Cheoah Bald salamander (Plethodon cheoah) VU^{IUCN}
- Fourche Mountain salamander (Plethodon fourchensis) VU^{IUCN}
- South Mountain gray-cheeked salamander (Plethodon meridianus) VU^{IUCN}
- Big Levels salamander (Plethodon sherando) VU^{IUCN}
- Red-legged salamander (Plethodon shermani) VU^{IUCN}
- Siskiyou Mountains salamander (Plethodon stormi) EN^{IUCN}
- Limestone salamander (Hydromantes brunus) VU^{IUCN}
- Shasta salamander (Hydromantes shastae) VU^{IUCN}
- Berry Cave salamander (Gyrinophilus gulolineatus) EN^{IUCN}
- West Virginia spring salamander (Gyrinophilus subterraneus) EN^{IUCN}
- Tennessee cave salamander (Gyrinophilus palleucus) VU^{IUCN}
- Salado Springs salamander (Eurycea chisholmensis) VU^{IUCN}
- Junaluska salamander (Eurycea junaluska) VU^{IUCN}
- Cascade Caverns salamander (Eurycea latitans) VU^{IUCN}
- San Marcos salamander (Eurycea nana) VU^{IUCN}
- Georgetown salamander (Eurycea naufragia) EN^{IUCN}
- Texas salamander (Eurycea neotenes) VU^{IUCN}
- Barton Springs salamander (Eurycea sosorum) VU^{IUCN}
- Jollyville Plateau salamander (Eurycea tonkawae) EN^{IUCN}
- Comal blind salamander (Eurycea tridentifera) VU^{IUCN}
- Texas blind salamander (Eurycea rathbuni) VU^{IUCN}
- Austin blind salamander (Eurycea waterlooensis) VU^{IUCN}
- Georgia blind salamander (Haideotriton wallacei) VU^{IUCN}

== Order Anura (frogs) ==
Family Bufonidae (toads)

- Arroyo toad (Anaxyrus californicus) EN^{IUCN}
- Yosemite toad (Anaxyrus canorus) EN^{IUCN}
- Black toad (Anaxyrus exsul) VU^{IUCN}
- Houston toad (Anaxyrus houstonensis) EN^{IUCN}
- Amargosa toad (Anaxyrus nelsoni) EN^{IUCN}

Family Ranidae (true frogs)

- Chiricahua leopard frog (Lithobates chiricahuensis) VU^{IUCN}
  - Ramsey Canyon leopard frog (Lithobates subaquavocalis) CR, species not recognized by SSAR
- Florida bog frog (Lithobates okaloosae) VU^{IUCN}
- Relict leopard frog (Lithobates onca) EN^{IUCN}
- Mississippi gopher frog (Lithobates sevosus) CR^{IUCN}
- Tarahumara frog (Lithobates tarahumarae) VU^{IUCN}
- California red-legged frog (Rana draytonii) VU^{IUCN}
- Mountain yellow-legged frog (Rana muscosa) EN^{IUCN}
- Oregon spotted frog (Rana pretiosa) VU^{IUCN}
- Sierra Nevada yellow-legged frog (Rana sierrae) EN^{IUCN}

== See also ==
- List of North American reptiles
- List of North American amphibians
