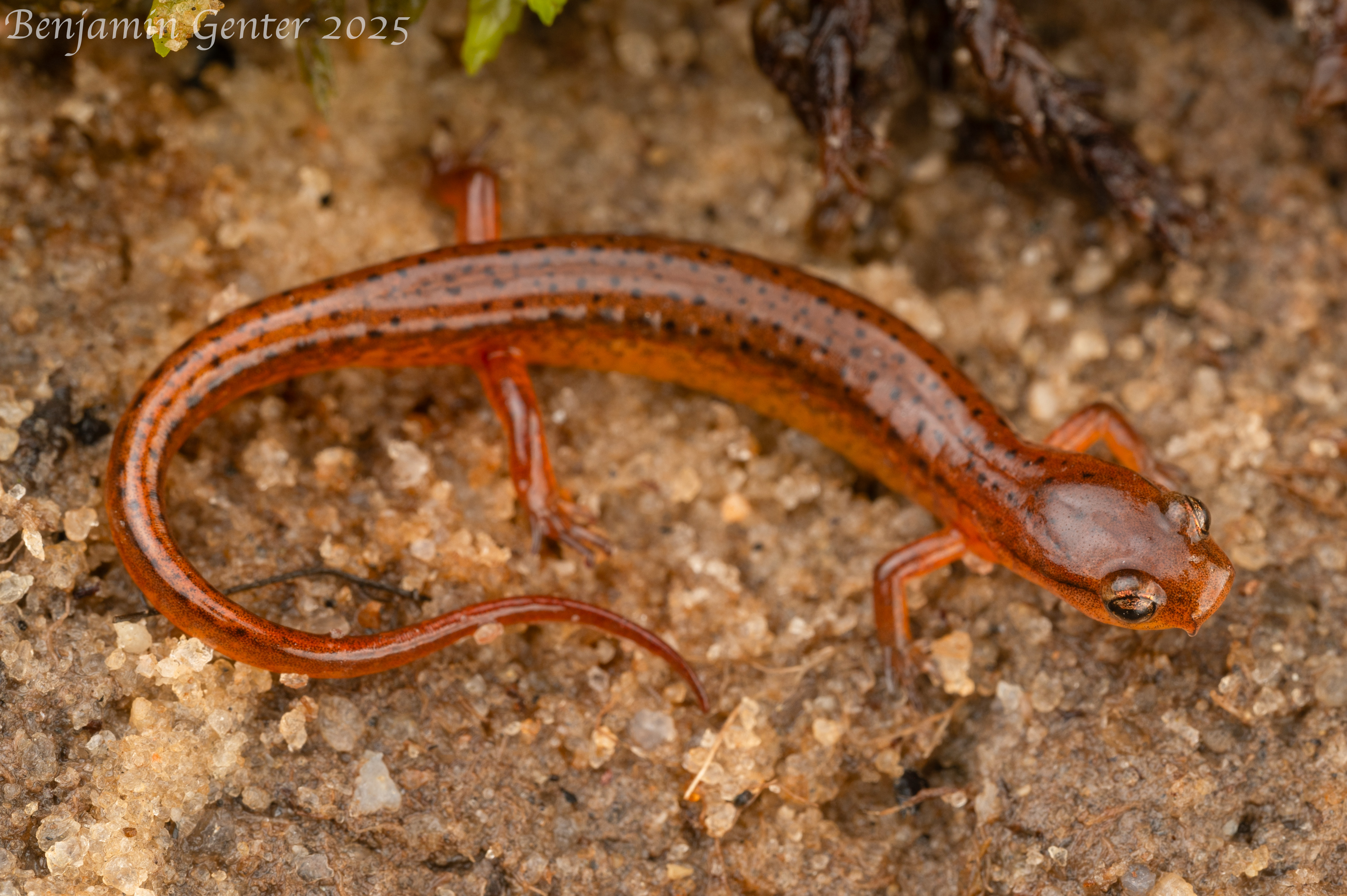

Conservation status
- Near Threatened (IUCN 3.1)

Scientific classification
- Kingdom: Animalia
- Phylum: Chordata
- Class: Amphibia
- Order: Urodela
- Family: Plethodontidae
- Genus: Eurycea
- Species: E. arenicola

Binomial name
- Eurycea arenicola Stuart et al., 2020

= Carolina Sandhills salamander =

Species of amphibian

The Carolina Sandhills salamander (Eurycea arenicola), is a species of lungless salamander endemic to the state of North Carolina in the United States, where it is only found in the Sandhills region. These species are known for their coloration and ecology. Researchers decades ago separated the species into northern and southern groups and found that the southern and northern Sandhill salamanders differ in coloration, size, and natural history.

== Habitat ==
The Carolina Sandhills salamander lives near small streams . It can also be found in forested areas near streams and rivers. Overall, the Carolina Sandhills salamander's habitat is a part of the mid-Atlantic coastal plain region.

== Taxonomy ==
It is a member of the "two-lined salamander" complex, a species complex also containing several other Eurycea species including E. bisineata, E. cirrigera, and E. wilderae. It is most closely related to E. cirrigera but can be distinguished from it by the dark-spotted, orange-to-red coloration of mature individuals, in contrast to the much more yellowish E. cirrigera. Carolina Sandhill salamanders have shorter bodies, tail, and heads compared to their close relative, E. cirrigera.

This group includes six named taxa, and studies suggest that these salamanders have shared ancestry, which goes back to the Miocene.

This species complex is difficult to classify for many scientists, as their physical traits, mitochondrial DNA, and nuclear DNA, along with other genetic evidence, have produced many conflicting relationships. In addition to that, when scientists examined various types of data, these data points didn't always lead to the same family relationships between the salamanders. Because of this difficult classification, certain authors say that the current taxonomy doesn't fully explain the group's evolutionary relationships.

Evolutionary history, such as ancient river drainage systems, has separated these salamander populations. That said, drainage changes that occurred later on allowed for certain populations to come back into contact. This allowed for introgression between the different lineages.

Studies show that since different salamander groups exchanged genes after separating, their evolutionary history is far more complex than just a simple family tree. They describe their evolutionary history as "reticulate," where the lineages are split apart and then mixed genetically again.

== Discovery ==
The species was discovered in 1969 by Alvin Braswell, a curator of the North Carolina Museum of Natural Sciences, who collected the first known specimen. It was initially thought to be an unusual southern two-lined salamander (E. cirrigera), but further discoveries of similar specimens indicated a distinct population of salamanders, potentially representing an undescribed species. Attempts were made by Braswell in the 1980s to describe the species, but he cut his research short after he found his duties as assistant curator to be too burdensome. He turned his research over to his successor, Bryan Stuart, in 2008; Stuart continued Braswell's project starting in 2013 after technological advances allowed for further DNA sequencing; the species was finally described in 2020.

== Distribution ==
It is found in the Carolina Sandhills. It inhabits the longleaf pine ecosystem, where it lives in springs and blackwater rivers, as with other endangered amphibians restricted to this ecosystem such as the Pine Barrens tree frog (Dryophytes andersonii). Although all known records are from North Carolina, one specimen was found only 2 miles from the border with South Carolina, so it may be present there as well.

== Threats ==
Although they are common species in their area, they have been added to a watch list by the North Carolina Natural Heritage Program for more than 20 years for the populations survival. Its population has declined due to general habitat alteration and loss.
