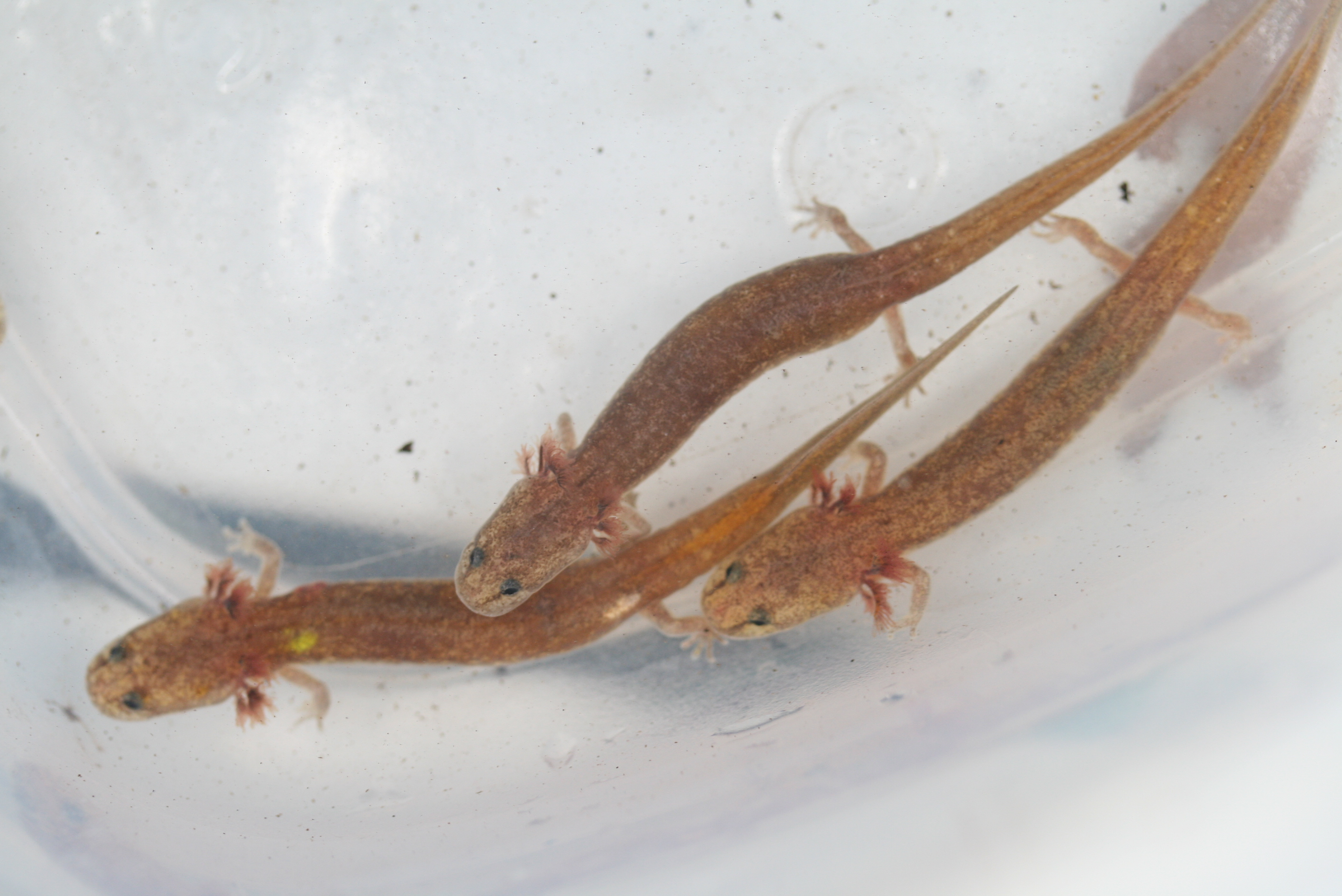

Conservation status
- Critically Endangered (IUCN 3.1)

- Critically Imperiled (NatureServe)

Scientific classification
- Kingdom: Animalia
- Phylum: Chordata
- Class: Amphibia
- Order: Urodela
- Family: Plethodontidae
- Genus: Eurycea
- Species: E. naufragia

Binomial name
- Eurycea naufragia Chippindale, Price, Wiens & Hillis, 2000
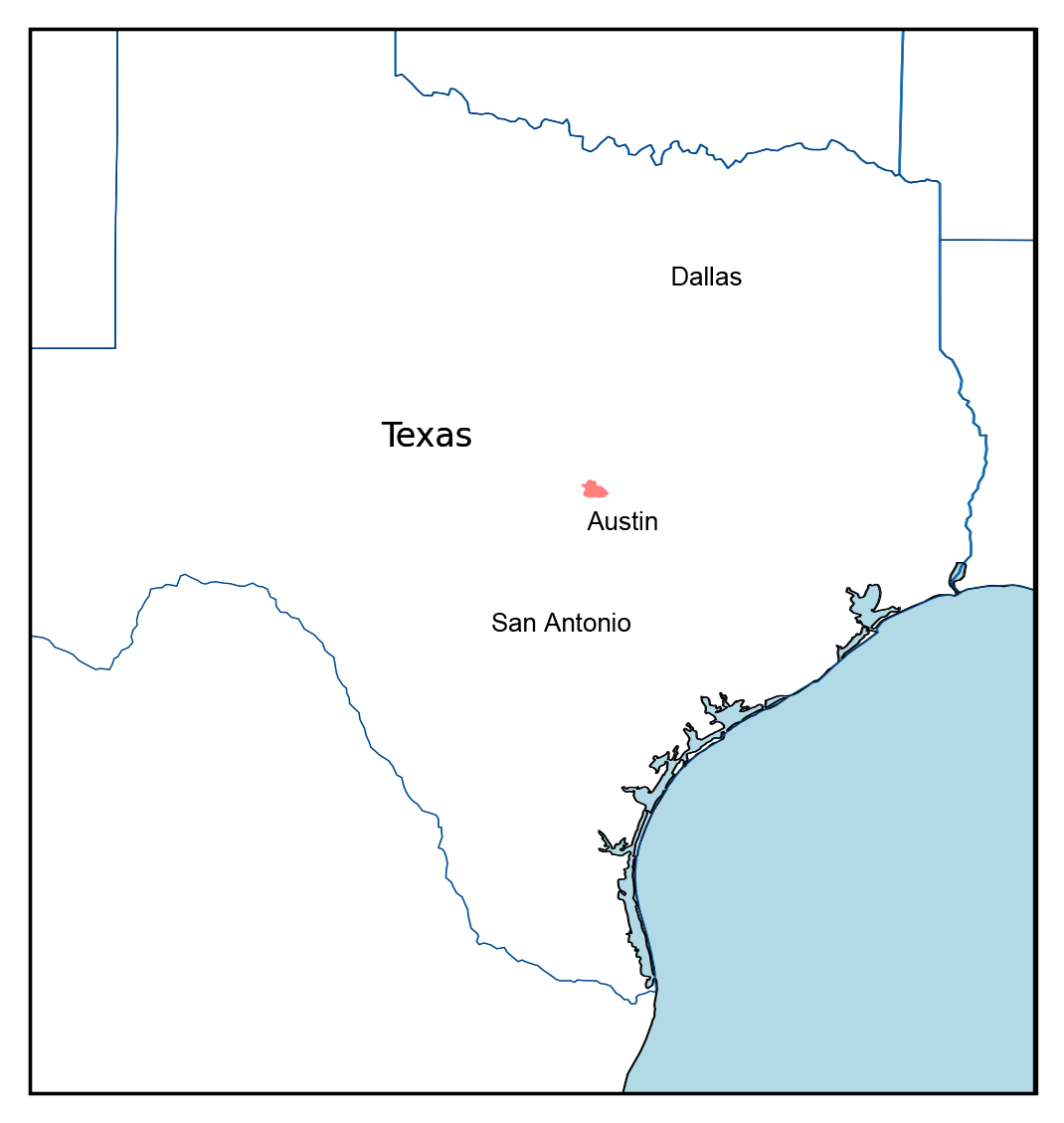
- Georgetown salamander range

= Georgetown salamander =

Species of amphibian

The Georgetown salamander (Eurycea naufragia), also known as the San Gabriel Springs salamander, is a species of salamander in the family Plethodontidae. It is endemic to springs in Williamson County, Texas, near Lake Georgetown. It inhabits freshwater springs and, possibly, caves. It is threatened by habitat loss. Many of the springs where this species formerly lived have been destroyed by development, including creation of Lake Georgetown. The specific name (which means "remnants" in Latin) refers to the few remaining remnants of habitat for this species.

== Description ==
Georgetown salamanders are small, permanently aquatic salamanders. Adults are typically 5–7.5 cm (2.0–3.0 in) in length and less than 0.5 cm in diameter. Although their coloration varies, most adults are dark brown, dark olive, or gray. Juveniles tend to be darker in color. Coloration is confined to the dorsal and lateral sides of the body; the ventral surface is usually translucent. Many individuals have a light, cream- or yellow-colored stripe on the top of the tail.

The head is roughly shovel-shaped, broad but relatively short, and widest at the point where the upper and lower jaws meet. Three prominent external gills—often deep red in color—extend from each side of the head. The eyes are relatively large and have gold-colored irises. Black melanophores are concentrated around each eye, forming a black circle around the eye and a black line that runs from the corner of the eye to the nasal opening. There are 14-16 costal grooves, counting those in the fore limb and hind limb regions. Chippindale et al. (2000) described the osteology of the species and how it differs from that of E. tonkawae and E. chisholmensis.

== Distribution ==
The Georgetown salamander is associated with wet caves and springs in the San Gabriel River watershed in Williamson County, Texas. Salamanders have been observed at 14 locations in the county. These locations include some historical records; ongoing studies are taking place at two of the locations. Within the spring flows, the majority of salamanders are observed within a few meters of the spring origin.

== Life history ==
Most amphibians have biphasic lifecycles, spending part of their lives in water and part on land. However, the Georgetown salamander is permanently aquatic and retains its gills and flattened tail throughout its life. This retention of juvenile traits, called neoteny, is a fairly common trait within the genus Eurycea. The Georgetown salamander is active year-round.

The Georgetown salamander is believed to reproduce in the winter, as many other Eurycea species do. The salamanders produce an estimated 30 to 50 eggs per clutch, but likely lay them individually. The hatchlings are about 1 cm long and grow rapidly until they reach a head-trunk length of about 3 cm. At this point, growth is slowed and some salamanders may even shrink a small amount. The juvenile stage is typically two months to three years. Similar species live for five to 15 years, though the exact lifespan of the Georgetown salamander is unknown.

== Conservation ==
All known populations of the Georgetown salamander occur in an area undergoing rapid urbanization. Current threats to the salamander include depletion and pollution of the Edward's Aquifer, which supplies the springs and caves in which the salamander occurs. Increases in impervious cover associated with urbanization decrease recharge of the aquifer and increase runoff and introduction of pollutants into the aquifer. Pumping of groundwater further depletes the aquifer. Sedimentation associated with land clearing and construction is another threat to the salamanders, as they are critically dependent on the presence of interstitial spaces that are eliminated by sediment.

At present, only one population of the Georgetown salamander is located in a protected preserve. The Texas Commission on Environmental Quality regulates activities affecting water quality for the Edwards Plateau; however, TCEQ's regulations do not address such aspects as land use, impervious cover limitations, nonpoint-source pollution, or application of fertilizers and pesticides over the recharge zone. All of these represent threats to the Georgetown salamander's habitat.

=== Listing process ===
In 2011, several groups, including WildEarth Guardians and the Center for Biological Diversity, sued the US Fish and Wildlife Service (USFWS) on the grounds that the Service had not met deadlines to decide on listings for a number of candidate species, including the Georgetown salamander. Settlement of the case resulted in a commitment from USFWS to review the candidate species by 2016. In 2011, the USFWS announced that Eurycea naufragia, along with three other Eurycea species found in central Texas (E. chisholmensis, E. tonkawae, and E. waterlooensis) would undergo the formal review for possible listing as an endangered species. This process is currently in progress.
