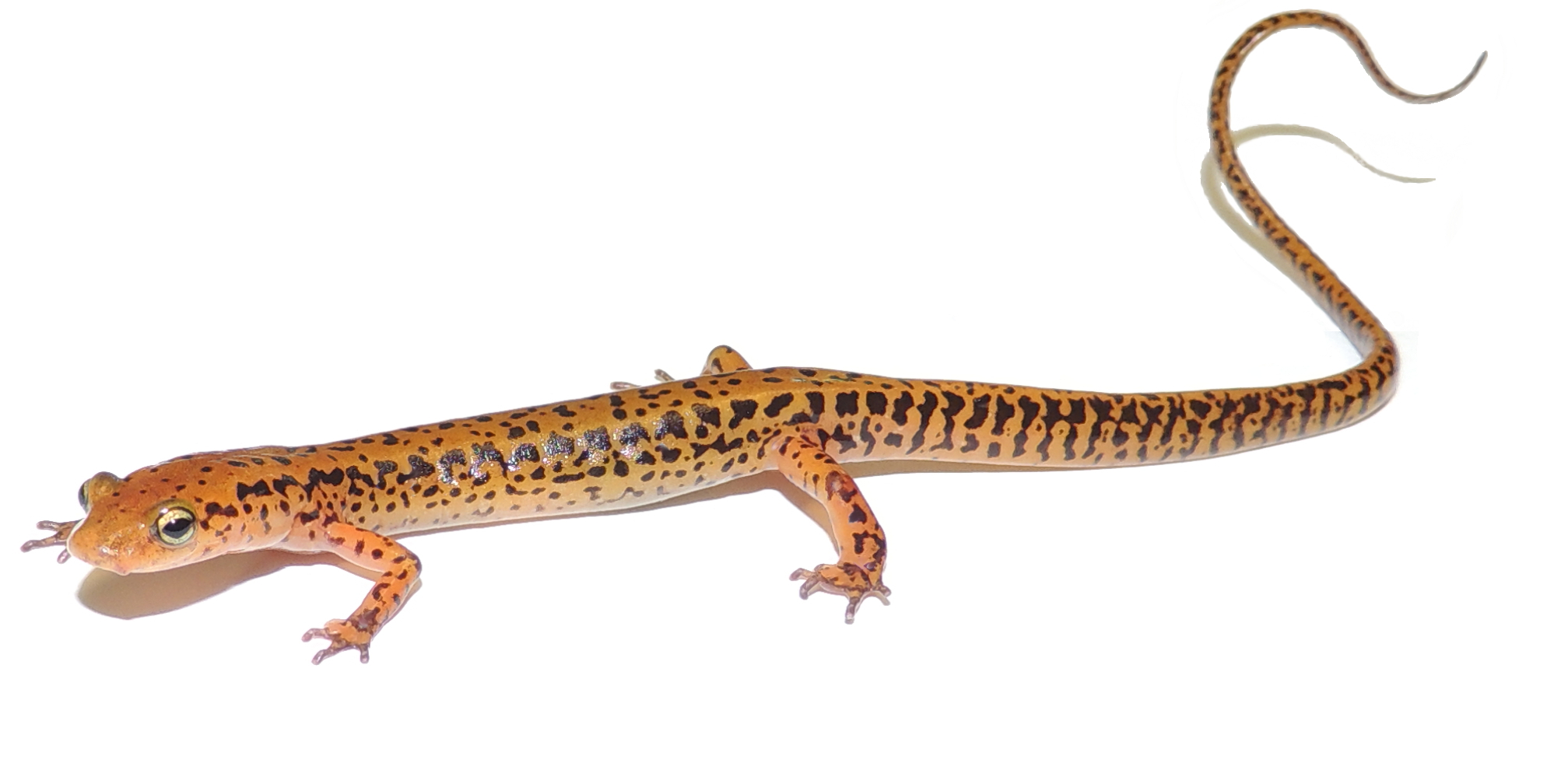

Conservation status
- Least Concern (IUCN 3.1)

- Secure (NatureServe)

Scientific classification
- Kingdom: Animalia
- Phylum: Chordata
- Class: Amphibia
- Order: Urodela
- Family: Plethodontidae
- Genus: Eurycea
- Species: E. longicauda

Binomial name
- Eurycea longicauda (Green, 1818)

Synonyms
- Salamandra longicauda Green, 1818; Spelerpes melanopleurus Cope, 1894 "1893"; Spelerpes stejnegeri Eigenmann, 1901

= Eurycea longicauda =

Species of amphibian

Eurycea longicauda, commonly known as the long-tailed salamander or longtail salamander, is a species of lungless salamander native to the Appalachian Region and Ohio River valley of the eastern United States. It is a "cave salamander" that frequents twilight zones of caves and also inhabits springs and surrounding forest.

== Subspecies ==
There are two or three subspecies:

- E. l. longicauda (Green, 1818) (long-tailed salamander, eastern long-tailed salamander)
- E. l. melanopleura (Cope, 1894 "1893") (dark-sided salamander, black-sided salamander, Cope's cave salamander)
- E. l. pernix Mittleman, 1942 (Midland long-tailed salamander)

Eurycea guttolineata has earlier been treated as a subspecies of Eurycea longicauda (that is, as E. l. guttolineata), but is now considered a full species.

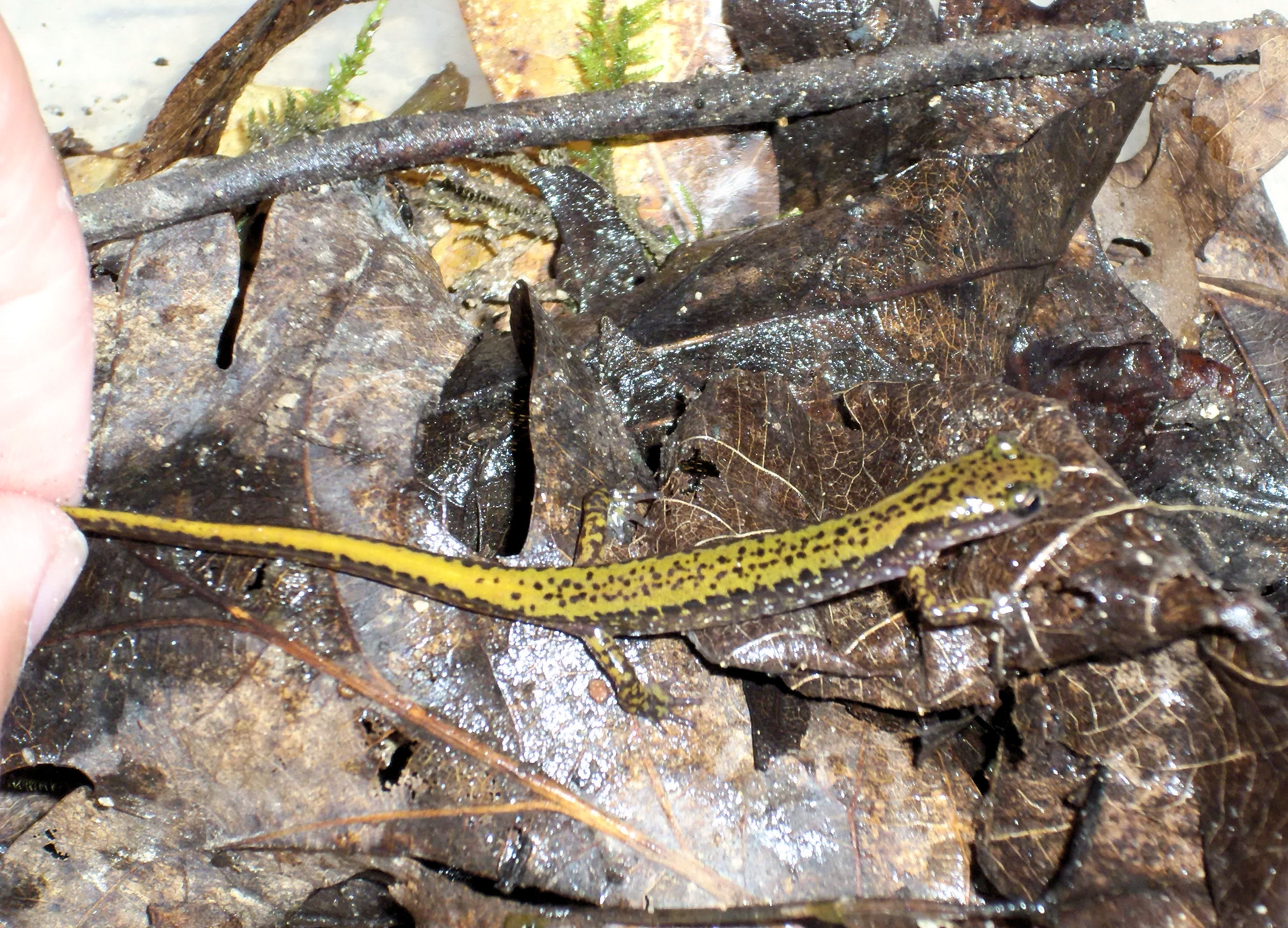
The dark-sided subspecies from Ozark County, Missouri

== Description ==
Body color varies from yellow to orange-red to red with random black spots. E. l. longicauda measure on average 50 mm (2.0 in) snout–vent length (SVL) and have 72 mm (2.8 in) long tail.

== Reproduction ==
E. l. melanopleura reproduces in November to February. The eggs measure 7 mm (0.28 in) in diameter. The larvae hatch in January–March at about 10 mm (0.39 in) snout–vent length (SVL). They metamorphose seven months later at 23–28 mm (0.91–1.10 in) SVL. Males become sexually mature between 31–43 mm (1.2–1.7 in) SVL and females 33–43 mm (1.3–1.7 in) SVL. The largest males and females are 55 mm (2.2 in) SVL.

== Habitat and conservation ==
Eurycea longicauda inhabit streamsides, spring runs, ponds, cave mouths, and abandoned mines. With wet weather, they may venture into wooded terrestrial habitats. They hide in rock crevices or under rocks, logs, etc. Eggs are laid in underground crevices associated with aquatic environments, but in caves they may also be attached to objects in or above water.

The overall population size of this species is large (probably more than 100,000). Some local populations may have been impacted by strip mining and acid drainage from coal mining, but there are no major threats overall. Its range overlaps with several protected areas.
