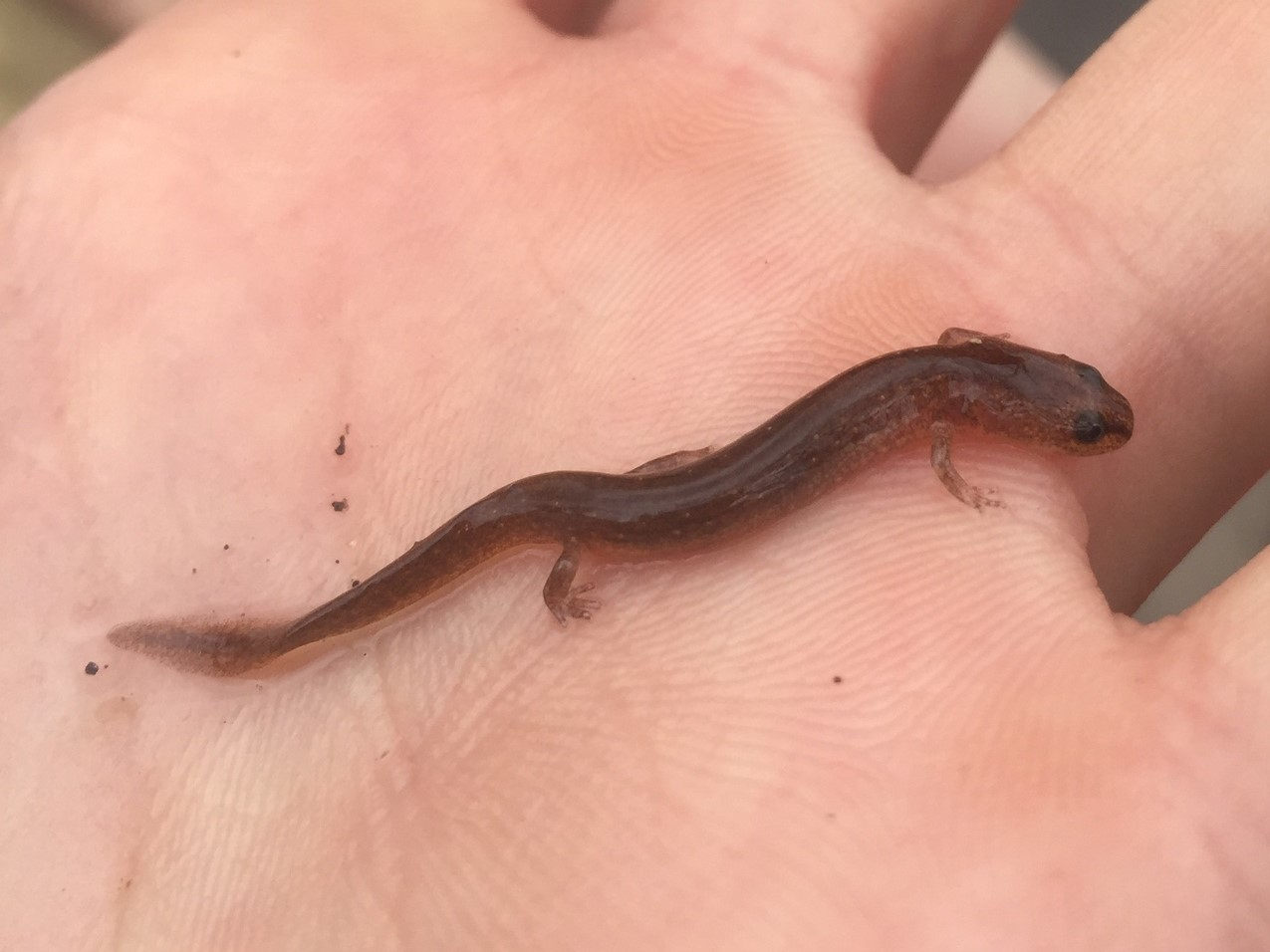

Conservation status
- Vulnerable (IUCN 3.1)

- Vulnerable (NatureServe)

Scientific classification
- Kingdom: Animalia
- Phylum: Chordata
- Class: Amphibia
- Order: Urodela
- Family: Plethodontidae
- Genus: Eurycea
- Species: E. troglodytes

Binomial name
- Eurycea troglodytes Baker, 1957

= Valdina Farms salamander =

Species of amphibian

The Valdina Farms salamander (Eurycea troglodytes) is a species of aquatic salamander described from Valdina Farms Sinkhole in Medina County, Texas, United States. It is sometimes referred to as the Valdina blind salamander or sinkhole salamander. As some other species of Eurycea found in Texas, it was once classified as a subspecies of the Texas salamander, Eurycea neotenes, and believed to possibly be the result of hybridization with another species of subterranean salamander, but was granted full species status in 2000. Research is ongoing, and some sources suggest the current species may actually be multiple distinct species.

== Description ==
The Valdina Farms salamander grows from 2–3 inches (5.1–7.6 cm) in length, with short legs, reduced eyes under a layer of skin, and external gills. They are grey- or cream-colored, and translucent, sometimes with pale yellow striping or white speckling. Few specimens are known, so the variability of their color and pattern is unknown.

== Behavior ==
It is entirely aquatic, and mostly subterranean, found in springs deep in limestone crevices, which makes definitively establishing its complete geographic range or its population numbers very difficult.
