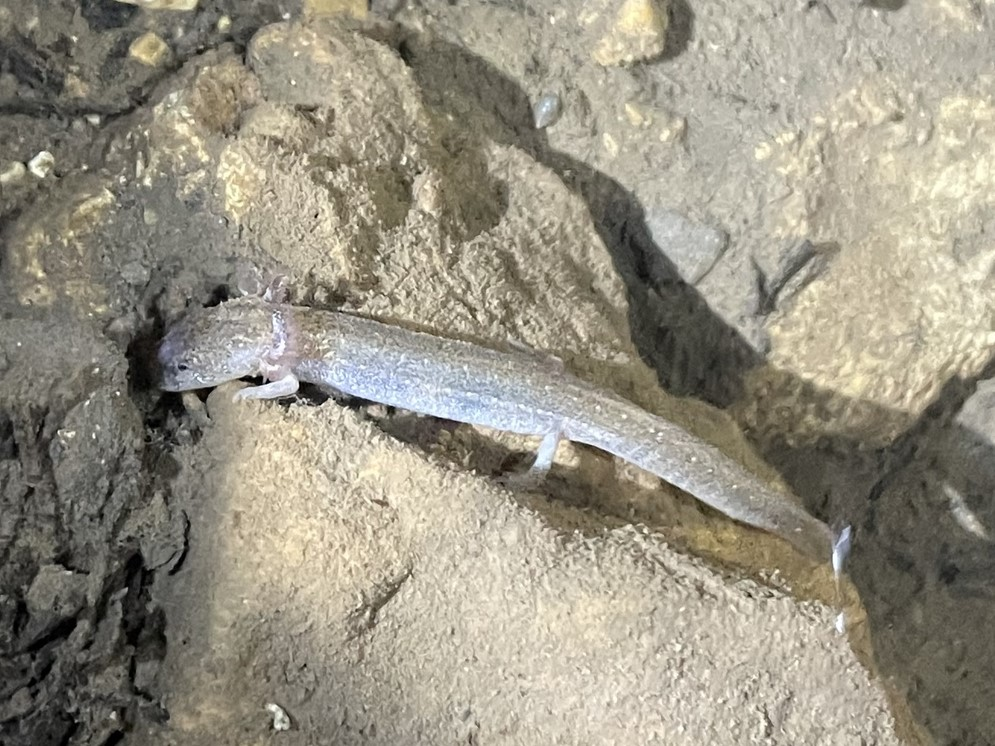

Conservation status
- Vulnerable (IUCN 3.1)

- Vulnerable (NatureServe)

Scientific classification
- Kingdom: Animalia
- Phylum: Chordata
- Class: Amphibia
- Order: Urodela
- Family: Plethodontidae
- Genus: Eurycea
- Species: E. latitans

Binomial name
- Eurycea latitans Smith & Potter, 1946

= Cascade Caverns salamander =

Species of amphibian

The Cascade Caverns salamander (Eurycea latitans), or Cascade Caverns neotenic salamander, is a species of aquatic salamander endemic to Cascade Caverns in Kendall County, Texas. Like other species of cave salamanders, they are almost entirely subterranean, living in spring waters deep in limestone rock strata, so gauging the exact extent of their geographic range or even their population numbers is virtually impossible. This also leads to reduced sampling for study, which has led to some uncertainty in the taxonomic classification; some sources consider all species of Texas cave salamanders to be subspecies of the Texas salamander. Eurycea neotenes and Eurycea rathbuni also live in caves and eat small insects and spiders.

== Description ==
The Cascade Caverns salamander is translucent, with a faint net-shaped pattern that is brown in color, often with white speckling. The species is rarely seen, so the amount of variation in their coloration is unknown. They are neotenic, meaning they retain characteristics into adulthood that are usually associated with juvenile salamanders, such as external gills. They have stout bodies, with short legs, and reduced eyes set under a layer of skin. This species of salamanders is threatened and could become endangered.
