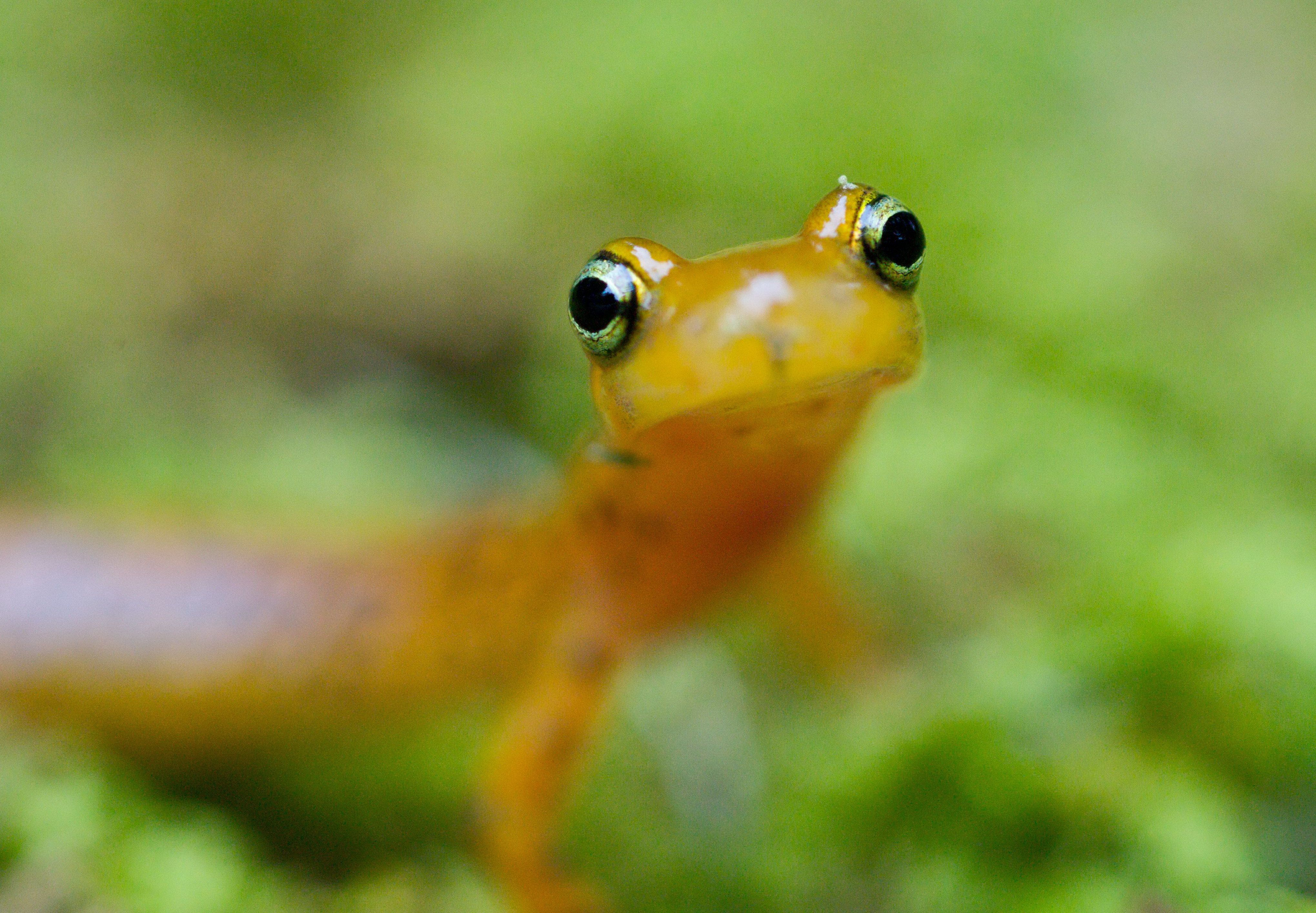
- Eurycea longicauda

Scientific classification
- Kingdom: Animalia
- Phylum: Chordata
- Class: Amphibia
- Order: Urodela
- Family: Plethodontidae
- Subfamily: Hemidactyliinae
- Genus: Eurycea; Rafinesque, 1822

Synonyms
- Belpsimolge; Cylindrosoma; Haideotriton; Manculus; Notiomolge; Paedomolge; Saurocercus; Septentriomolge; Spelerpes; Typhlomolge; Typhlotriton

= Brook salamander =

Brook salamanders

Genus of salamanders

Brook salamanders are a genus, Eurycea, of salamanders native to North America.

== Taxonomy ==
The genus Eurycea was first described by Constantine Samuel Rafinesque-Schmaltz in 1822, with a specimen of the spotted-tail salamander, Eurycea lucifuga, from Kentucky. The taxonomy of the genus is somewhat confusing, as many of the species within it are poorly studied and are found only in very restricted ranges, or deep within caverns. Several species have even been described several times by different researchers, and some are often considered to be morphologically different enough to warrant being placed into their own genera.

A recent taxonomic revision moved the Georgia blind salamander to this genus, which makes Haideotriton a synonym of Eurycea.

Many sources also refer to several species of the genus as cave salamanders, due to their choice of habitat, or as blind salamanders, due to their reduced eyes, or the antiquated term for aquatic salamanders, Triton. Most species are from very isolated localities, so bear the name of the place the first specimen was found.

== Diversificatuion ==
A 2006 analysis of salamanders of the genus Eurycea, in the Appalachians, found that the current taxonomy of the group greatly underestimated species level diversity. The authors found that patterns of phyleographic diversity were more associated with historical (rather than modern) drainage connections, indicating that major shifts in the drainage patterns of the region played an important role in the generation of diversity of these salamanders. A thorough understanding of phylogeographic structure will thus allow informed choices in prioritizing areas for conservation.

== Species ==
This genus is composed of these 33 species:

Binomial name and author	Common name
Eurycea aquatica Rose & Bush, 1963	Brown-backed salamander
Eurycea arenicola Stuart et al., 2020	Carolina Sandhills salamander
Eurycea bislineata (Green, 1818)	Northern two-lined salamander
Eurycea braggi (Smith, 1968)	Southern grotto salamander
Eurycea chamberlaini Harrison & Guttman, 2003	Chamberlain's dwarf salamander
Eurycea chisholmensis Chippindale, Price, Wiens & Hillis, 2000	Salado Springs salamander
Eurycea cirrigera (Green, 1831)	Southern two-lined salamander
Eurycea guttolineata (Holbrook, 1838)	Three-lined salamander
Eurycea hillisi Wray, Means, and Steppan, 2017	Hillis's dwarf salamander
Eurycea junaluska Sever, Dundee & Sullivan, 1976	Junaluska salamander
Eurycea latitans Smith & Potter, 1946	Cascade Caverns salamander
Eurycea longicauda (Green, 1818)	Long-tailed salamander
Eurycea lucifuga Rafinesque, 1822	Spotted-tail salamander
Eurycea melanopleura (Cope, 1894 "1893")	Dark-sided salamander
Eurycea multiplicata (Cope, 1869)	Many-ribbed salamander
Eurycea nana Bishop, 1941	San Marcos salamander
Eurycea naufragia Chippindale, Price, Wiens & Hillis, 2000	Georgetown salamander
Eurycea neotenes Bishop & Wright, 1937	Texas salamander
Eurycea nerea (Bishop, 1944)	Northern grotto salamander
Eurycea paludicola (Mittleman, 1947)	Western dwarf salamander
Eurycea pterophila Burger, Smith & Potter, 1950	Fern bank salamander
Eurycea quadridigitata (Holbrook, 1842)	Southeastern dwarf salamander
Eurycea rathbuni (Stejneger, 1896)	Texas blind salamander
Eurycea robusta (Longley, 1978)	Blanco blind salamander
Eurycea sosorum Chippindale, Price & Hillis, 1993	Barton Springs salamander
Eurycea spelaea (Stejneger, 1892)	Western grotto salamander
Eurycea sphagnicola Wray, Means, and Steppan, 2017	Bog dwarf salamander
Eurycea subfluvicola (Steffen, Irwin, Blair, and Bonett, 2014)	Ouachita streambed salamander
Eurycea tonkawae Chippindale, Price, Wiens & Hillis, 2000	Jollyville Plateau salamander
Eurycea troglodytes Baker, 1957	Valdina Farms salamander
Eurycea tynerensis Moore & Hughes, 1939	Oklahoma salamander
Eurycea wallacei (Carr, 1939)	Georgia blind salamander
Eurycea waterlooensis Hillis, Chamberlain, Wilcox & Chippindale, 2001	Austin blind salamander
Eurycea wilderae Dunn, 1920	Blue Ridge two-lined salamander

== Intrinsic Phylogeny ==
- - - Eurycea multiplicata
    - - Eurycea spelaea
      - Eurycea tynerensis
  - - - - Eurycea wallacei
        - - Eurycea lucifuga
          - Eurycea longicauda
      - - Eurycea cirrigera
        - - Eurycea wilderae
          - - Eurycea bislineata
            - - Eurycea junaluska
              - Eurycea aquatica
    - - Eurycea quadridigitata
      - - - Eurycea naufragia
          - - Eurycea tonkawae
            - Eurycea chisholmensis
        - - - Eurycea waterlooensis
            - Eurycea rathbuni
          - - Eurycea troglodytes
            - - Eurycea sosorum
              - - Eurycea nana
                - - Eurycea neotenes
                  - - Eurycea pterophila
                    - - Eurycea tridentifera
                      - Eurycea latitans

Intrinsic phylogeny tree of genus Eurycea.

== Diet ==
Eurycea eat a variety of small arthropods such as spiders, Armadillidiidae, and insects. The food of larvae is at the same trophic level as the adults. E. cirrega, for example, eat isopods, chironomids, and copepods.

== Reproduction ==
Mating can occur from fall to spring. Males use their premaxillary teeth to scratch the female during reproduction, most likely to release various pheromones.
