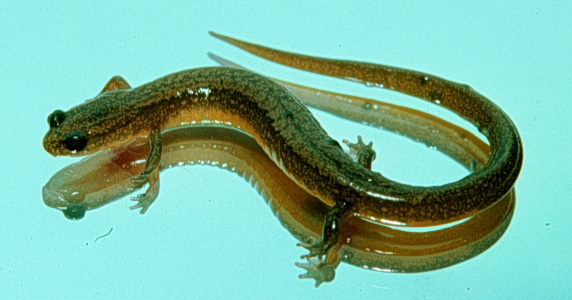

Conservation status
- Least Concern (IUCN 3.1)

- Secure (NatureServe)

Scientific classification
- Kingdom: Animalia
- Phylum: Chordata
- Class: Amphibia
- Order: Urodela
- Family: Plethodontidae
- Genus: Eurycea
- Species: E. multiplicata

Binomial name
- Eurycea multiplicata (Cope, 1869)

= Many-ribbed salamander =

Species of amphibian

The many-ribbed salamander (Eurycea multiplicata) is a species of salamander in the family Plethodontidae, endemic to the United States. Its natural habitats are temperate forests, rivers, freshwater springs, inland karsts, and caves.

It is endemic in its distribution to eastern Oklahoma, southwestern Missouri, and northwestern Arkansas, and the portion of Kansas in Cherokee County.

Reproduction is aquatic and long-distance migrations unlikely. Populations that inhabit thermally stable springs have a prolonged mating season compared with populations inhabiting surface streams with more variable temperatures. Based on the times when females contained spermatozoa in their reproductive tracts, mating activity could be from July–May.
