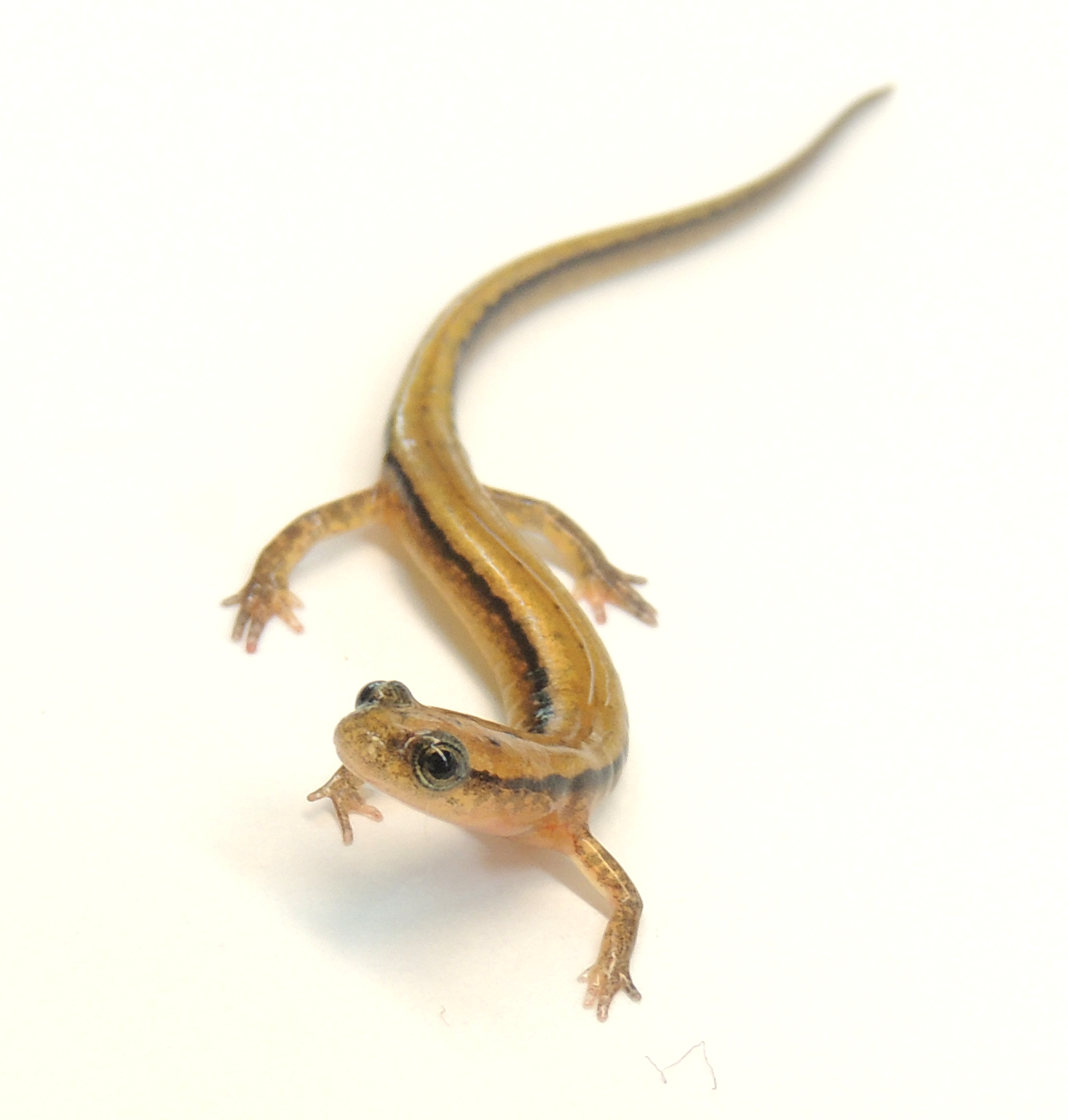

Conservation status
- Least Concern (IUCN 3.1)

- Secure (NatureServe)

Scientific classification
- Kingdom: Animalia
- Phylum: Chordata
- Class: Amphibia
- Order: Urodela
- Family: Plethodontidae
- Genus: Eurycea
- Species: E. cirrigera

Binomial name
- Eurycea cirrigera (Green, 1818)

= Southern two-lined salamander =

Species of amphibian

The southern two-lined salamander (Eurycea cirrigera) is a species of salamander in the family Plethodontidae, endemic to the United States. Its natural habitats are temperate forests, rivers, intermittent rivers, swamps, and freshwater springs.

== Appearance ==
The southern two-lined salamander is a small thin salamander, distinguished by the two lines running down the lateral portion of its body. The salamander is deep-light brown and fairly small, growing up to 6.5–12 cm in length. The species has 14 costal grooves between its limbs. Southern two-lined salamanders experience female-based sexual dimorphism. The key difference between the Southern two lined salamander from the Northern salamander is that the black lines run all the way down to the tail. When the salamander reaches sexual maturity males begin to show Cirri and enlarged jaw muscles.
The southern two-lined salamander had two morphs, one of these, the Brownback salamander is now its own species. The other morphs, the Cole Springs Phenotype is found in other two lined salamanders but in the southern two-lined salamander is limited to northern Alabama. This morph results in an individual being significantly larger and darker colored than the normal salamander.

They exhibit sexual dimorphism in males having larger heads than females.

== Reproduction ==
Southern two-lined salamander uses external fertilization. Females will lay single-layer clusters of 20–100 eggs and deposit them under flat rocks that are located in shallow following streams during mid-March to April. Females are known to guard their nest against predators.

Males premaxillary teeth enlarge during breeding season, and when court shipping, he scrapes the female's head, and this will help with the secretions of the mental gland.

== Range ==
The southern two-lined salamander is found in the Southeast United States except for peninsular Florida.

== Habitat ==
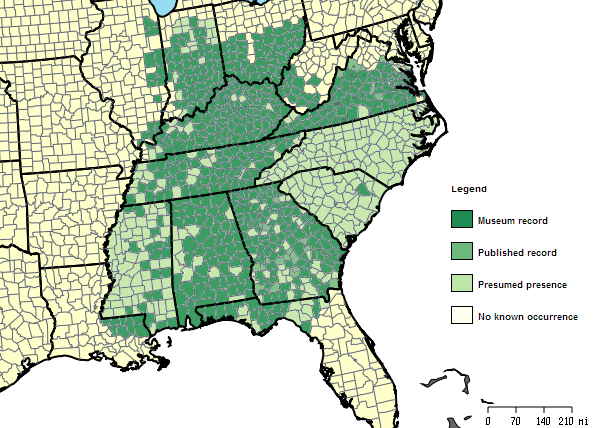
The historic extent of the southern two-lined salamander.

Adults use small, rocky streams or seeps in forested areas, but can also be found in and around springs. They generally keep to a narrow home range. Eggs are laid in shallow, flowing water with gravelly substrate where they are attached singly undersurfaces of submerged rocks or logs.

== Predators ==
Southern two-lined salamanders are preyed upon by red salamanders (Pseudotriton ruber) and other larger salamanders. They are also eaten by snakes and owls.

== Conservation ==
It has been noted by researchers that as the watersheds are being urbanized the capacity of streams to be habitable for southern two-lined salamander decreases. Although this species is not in a concerned status for conservation, it has been recommended that unbreeched buffers be created in streams to preserve the habitat for this species.
