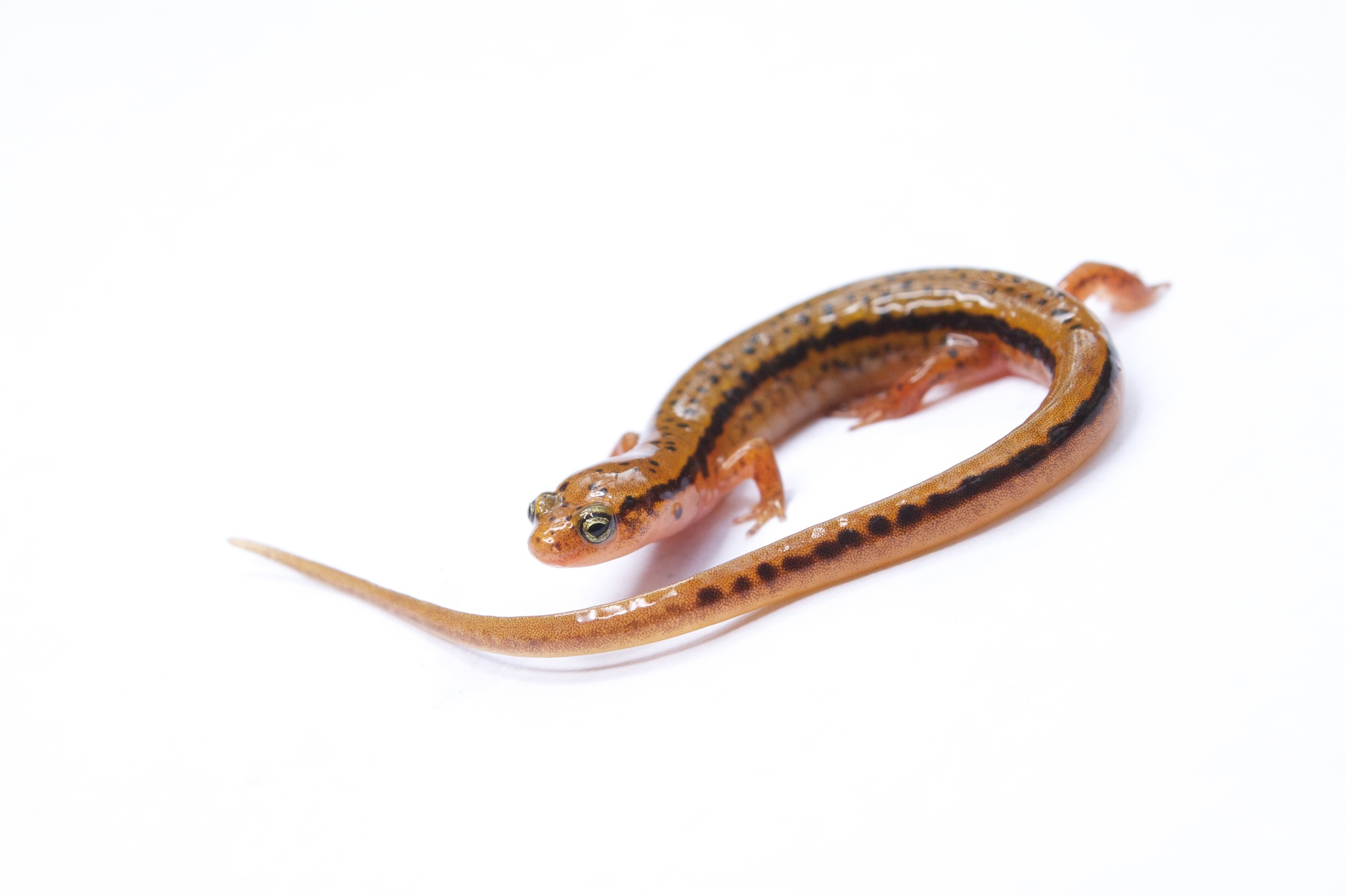

Conservation status
- Least Concern (IUCN 3.1)

- Secure (NatureServe)

Scientific classification
- Kingdom: Animalia
- Phylum: Chordata
- Class: Amphibia
- Order: Urodela
- Family: Plethodontidae
- Genus: Eurycea
- Species: E. wilderae

Binomial name
- Eurycea wilderae Dunn, 1920

= Blue Ridge two-lined salamander =

Species of amphibian

The Blue Ridge two-lined salamander (Eurycea wilderae) is a species of salamander in the family Plethodontidae, endemic to the United States. This species is found in the southern Appalachian Mountains, mostly south of Virginia. To the north is a similar salamander, Eurycea bislineata, or the northern two-lined salamander. Its genus, Eurycea contains 33 species and includes taxa that have either a metamorphic life cycle or larval-form paedomorphosis. In species that metamorphose, there can be within-and among-population variation in larval life-history characteristics, e.g., duration of the larval period and size at metamorphosis. Intraspecific geographic variation in species of Eurycea has been attributed to several factors: temperature, stream order and productivity of the larval habitat.

Adult Blue Ridge two-lined salamanders are commonly found near stream banks. The larvae are aquatic, living in streams and seeps. Its natural habitats are temperate forests, rivers, intermittent rivers, and freshwater springs. It is threatened by habitat loss. This species is named after zoologist Inez Whipple Wilder, who studied biology of Eurycea species. These amphibians are listed by the IUCN as a species of least concern for conservation.

== Morphology ==
The Blue Ridge two-lined salamander ranges in size from 2 3/4 - 4 1/2 inches (7-10.7 cm) and ranges in color from bright yellow, yellow-orange, to orange. There are two black dorsolateral lines that usually break into dots or blotches around the middle of the tail. There are often scattered black dots on the back. The Blue Ridge two-lined salamander has a relatively long tail as it is between 55-60% of the total length. There are generally 14 to 16 costal grooves, based on elevation. At a lower elevation, 14 costal grooves is more common. Nasolabial grooves, also known as cirri, are common. Larvae are typically pale-yellow to yellow-green dorsally.

== Reproduction ==
The Blue Ridge two-lined salamander is an external fertilizer. Its oviposition usually occurs during late winter or early spring months. The female deposits eggs under rocks, logs, or leaves in water which they will then guard until the eggs hatch. Hatchlings emerge with external gills and spend around 2 years fully aquatic larvae before transforming into adults. When the larvae begin to metamorphosize is largely dependent on temperature and food availability. Those exposed to higher temperature will metamorphosize sooner. In contrast those that had more food grew a lot larger and waited longer before metamorphosizing. Evidence suggests direct-development was the ancestral form of development, with the metamorphic life cycle being an example of metamorphic deceleration.

There is sexual dimorphism between two types of males: searching males and guarding males. Searching males have cirri, mental glands, longer legs, and protruding premaxillary teeth, which are adapted for locating and courting females in terrestrial habitats. Guarding males lack these characteristics and instead have seasonally enlarged jaw musculature adapted for defending females at aquatic nesting sites.

== Distribution and habitat ==
The Blue Ridge two-lined salamanders have been reported to the southern Appalachian Mountain range. Within those mountains they will be found along streams and forested habitat. The mating season will usually determine if they are discovered in more of a terrestrial or aquatic habitat. It is not well documented if this species migrates further than from terrestrial to aquatic habitats. They are lungless and require environments that are moist and cool. The streams that are more suitable for the Blue Ridge two- lined salamander contain submerged substrate to oviposit. When this salamander is not breeding they will burrow, typically under logs and leaf litter. Blue Ridge two-lined salamanders can reach densities of over 100 individuals in a square meter depending on habitat conditions.

== Diet ==
Their diet is very similar to other terrestrial salamanders. Both the aquatic juveniles and terrestrial adults have been documented eating copepods, midge larvae, nematodes, and both aquatic and terrestrial insects. The size of the prey items depends on the salamander's size and growth rate.

== Predators ==
Spring salamanders, garter snakes, black-bellied salamanders, and other larger plethodontids prey upon larval and adult Blue Ridge two-lined salamanders. The adults can use chemical sensing to detect predators. It was found in a study that even with the presence black bellied salamander predators (visually or detected by scent), the use of rocks for cover was not utilized by adults.

=== Prey items ===
Adult Blue Ridge two-lined salamander primary diet consists of terrestrial organisms such as non insect arthropods, worms, and marine invertebrates. The larvae will feed primarily on aquatic macroinvertebrates and some terrestrial insects.

== Behavior ==
To avoid competition and predation, stream salamanders such as the Blue Ridge two-lined salamander will segregate spatially within terrestrial habitats. During the day larvae seek refuge underneath rocks or in interstitial spaces in the gravel stream bed and, at night move throughout the stream as they feed. In a study on, Trade-off between Desiccation and Predation Risk, the Blue Ridge Two-lined occurred between 15– 20 m from the stream edge risking desiccation because the environment is less suitable due to drier environmental conditions rather than possible predation. Most of the competition is based on their size.
