= Austin blind salamander =

Conservation status
- Vulnerable (IUCN 3.1)

- Endangered (ESA)

Scientific classification
- Kingdom: Animalia
- Phylum: Chordata
- Class: Amphibia
- Order: Urodela
- Family: Plethodontidae
- Genus: Eurycea
- Species: E. waterlooensis

Binomial name
- Eurycea waterlooensis Hillis, Chamberlain, Wilcox & Chippindale, 2001
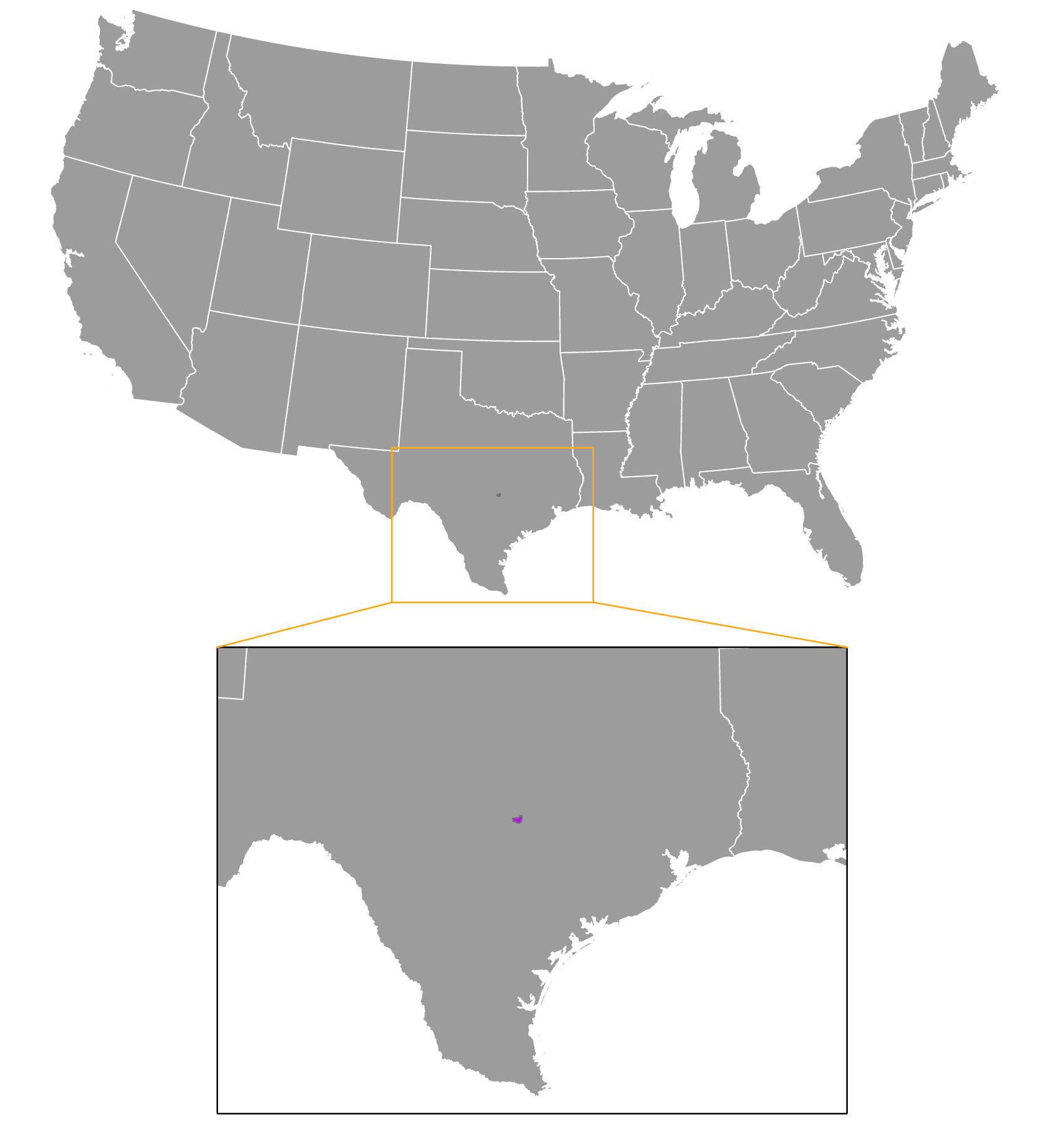
- Austin Blind Salamander range

Species of amphibian

The Austin blind salamander (Eurycea waterlooensis) is an endangered species of salamander in the family Plethodontidae, endemic to Barton Springs in Austin, Texas, United States. Its name is derived from Waterloo, the original name of Austin.

Austin blind salamanders, typically juveniles, have been observed at spring outlets. However, probably most of the population lives in subterranean cavities, and its total abundance is unknown, but it seems much less abundant than the sympatric Barton Springs salamander (E. sosorum).

It is a totally aquatic species that is paedomorphic (does not metamorphose).
