= Fern bank salamander =

Conservation status
- Endangered (IUCN 3.1)

- Vulnerable (NatureServe)

Scientific classification
- Kingdom: Animalia
- Phylum: Chordata
- Class: Amphibia
- Order: Urodela
- Family: Plethodontidae
- Genus: Eurycea
- Species: E. pterophila

Binomial name
- Eurycea pterophila Burger, Smith & Potter, 1950

Species of amphibian

The fern bank salamander (Eurycea pterophila), also known as the Blanco River Springs salamander, is a species of salamander in the family Plethodontidae. It is endemic to springs in the Blanco River watershed in central Texas, United States.

Its natural habitat is freshwater springs.
