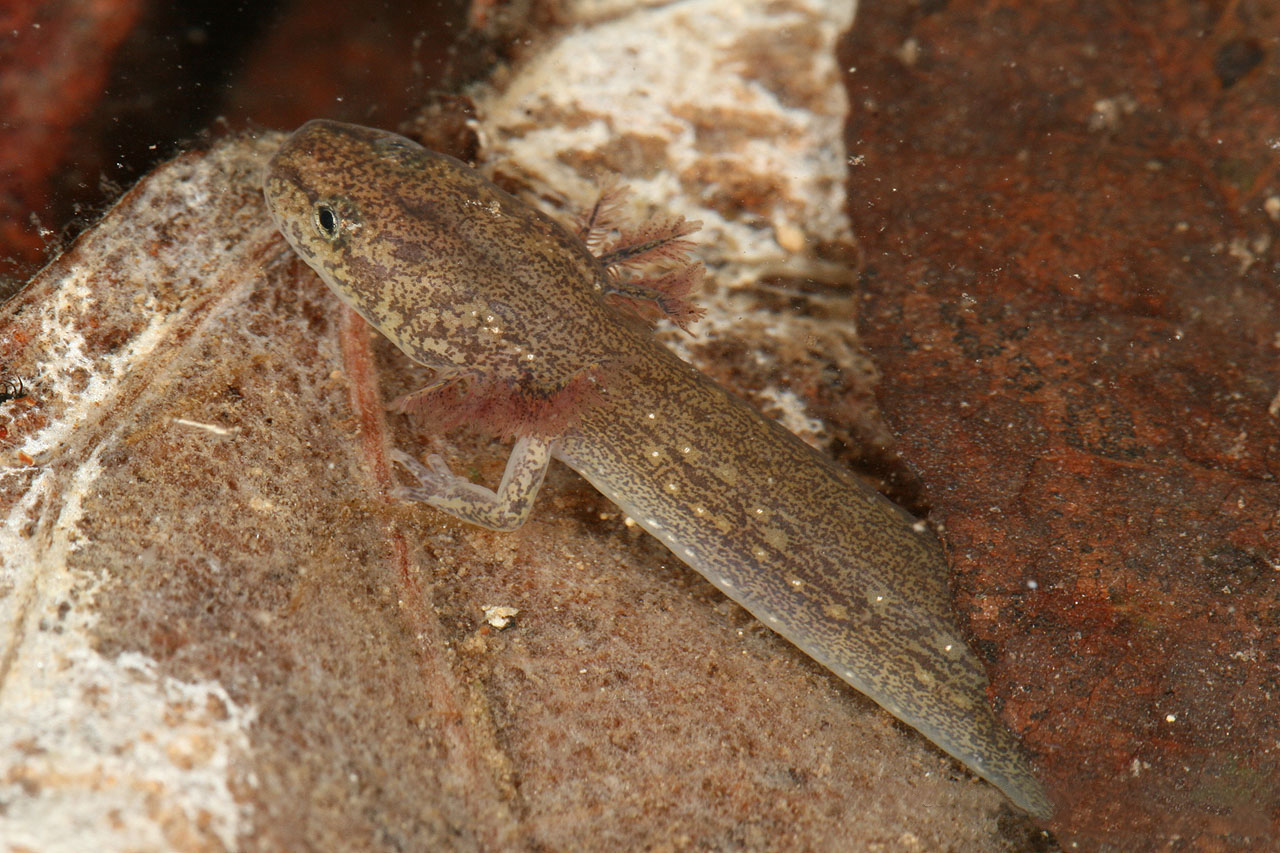

Conservation status
- Endangered (IUCN 3.1)

- Imperiled (NatureServe)

Scientific classification
- Kingdom: Animalia
- Phylum: Chordata
- Class: Amphibia
- Order: Urodela
- Family: Plethodontidae
- Genus: Eurycea
- Species: E. tonkawae

Binomial name
- Eurycea tonkawae Chippindale, Price, Wiens & Hillis, 2000

= Jollyville Plateau salamander =

Species of amphibian

The Jollyville Plateau salamander (Eurycea tonkawae) is a species of salamander in the family Plethodontidae. It is also known as the Tonkawa Springs salamander. It is endemic to Travis and Williamson counties, Texas, United States. This species is perrenibranchiate, retaining its gills throughout life.

Eurycea tonkawae is the sister taxon to E. naufragia and E. chisholmensis, two other endemic perrenibranchiate central Texas salamanders.

Its natural habitats are freshwater springs, spring runs, and wet caves of the Buttercup karst system. Cave dwelling E. tonkawae may represent a distinct species, however further work is needed to clarify their taxonomic status.

== Conservation status ==
Eurycea tonkawae is threatened by habitat loss and habitat degradation due to rapid urban growth. In August, 2013, this species was listed as threatened under the Endangered Species Act of 1973.

== Abundance and Distribution ==
Eurycea tonkawae have a restricted in abundance in areas with an abundance of water such as the vicinity of wet caves, springs, and spring dominated surface flows. They are known to inhabit aquatic habitats occupying areas under rocks, aquatic plants, and algae. Previous studies have shown highest abundance rates during rainfall seasons such as spring and summer. Eurycea tonkawae occur in a clumped-like distribution, only being found in the Jollyville Plateau and Brushy Creek areas in Texas counties.

== Notes ==
=== References ===
- Adcock, Z. C., MacLaren, A. R., Jones, R. M., Villamizar-Gomez, A., Wall, A. E., White Iv, K., & Forstner, M. R. J. (2022). Predicting surface abundance of federally threatened Jollyville Plateau Salamanders ( Eurycea tonkawae ) to inform management activities at a highly modified urban spring. PeerJ (San Francisco, CA), 10, e13359–e13359. https://doi.org/10.7717/peerj.13359
- Bendik, N. F. (2017). Demographics, reproduction, growth, and abundance of Jollyville Plateau salamanders (Eurycea tonkawae). Ecology and Evolution, 7(13), 5002–5015. https://doi.org/10.1002/ece3.3056
- Bowles, B. D., Sanders, M. S., & Hansen, R. S. (2006). Ecology of the Jollyville Plateau Salamander (Eurycea tonkawae: Plethodontidae) with an Assessment of the Potential Effects of Urbanization. Hydrobiologia, 553(1), 111–120. https://doi.org/10.1007/s10750-005-5440-0
- Chippindale, P.T., A.H. Price, & Hillis, D.M. (1993): A new species of perennibranchiate salamander (Eurycea, Plethodontidae) from Austin, Texas. Herpetologica 49: 242–259.
- Chippindale, P.T., A.H. Price, Wiens, J.J. & Hillis, D.M. (2000): Phylogenetic relationships of central Texas hemidactyliine plethodontid salamanders, genus Eurycea, and a taxonomic revision of the group. Herpetological Monographs 14: 1-80.
- Hillis, D.M., Chamberlain, D.A., Wilcox, T.P., & Chippindale, P.T. (2001): A new species of subterranean blind salamander (Plethodontidae: Hemidactyliini: Eurycea: Typhlomolge) from Austin, Texas, and a systematic revision of central Texas paedomorphic salamanders. Herpetologica 57: 266–280.
