= Brownback salamander =

Conservation status
- Least Concern (IUCN 3.1)

- Vulnerable (NatureServe)

Scientific classification
- Kingdom: Animalia
- Phylum: Chordata
- Class: Amphibia
- Order: Urodela
- Family: Plethodontidae
- Genus: Eurycea
- Species: E. aquatica

Binomial name
- Eurycea aquatica Rose & Bush, 1963

Species of amphibian

The brownback salamander (Eurycea aquatica) is a species of brook salamander. Its range includes parts of Alabama, Georgia, and Tennessee, where it occurs in natural freshwater springs typically abundant in watercress. Once considered an ecotype of the southern two-lined salamander, the brownback salamander was subsequently raised to full species status based on molecular evidence.

== Naming and etymology ==
The genus "Eurycea" is mythological in origin and was first used by Rafinesque in 1822 to describe all brook salamanders. The specific epithet aquatica refers to the habits of E. aquatica being more aquatic than those of the closely related salamander E. cirrigera.

== Range and habitat ==
The brownback salamander occurs in springs throughout the Southeast with verified localities existing in Alabama, Georgia, and Tennessee.

== Physical characteristics ==
The brownback salamander is so-named for its brown color, which is in contrast with the yellow hue of southern two-lined salamanders. Members of the species are typically 30–40 mm. Males and females are sexually dimorphic in head shape with the males having broader heads. Males of the brownback salamander do not possess cirri, which distinguishes this species from other brook salamanders including the southern two-lined salamander.
