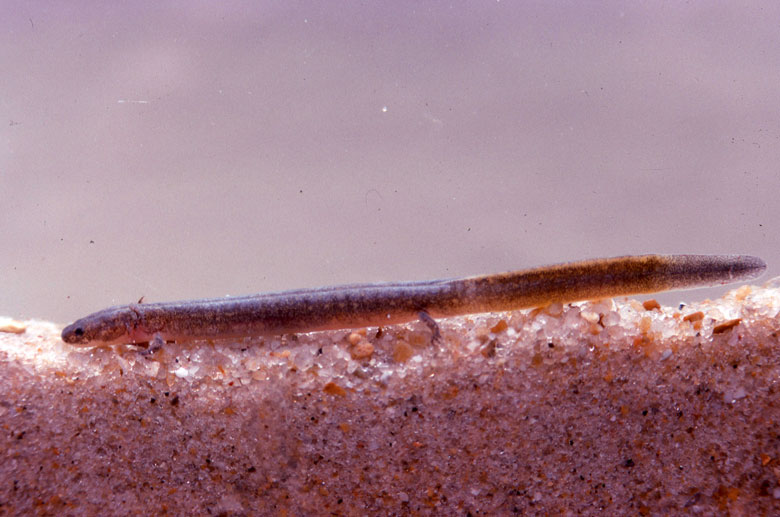

Conservation status
- Least Concern (IUCN 3.1)

- Vulnerable (NatureServe)

Scientific classification
- Kingdom: Animalia
- Phylum: Chordata
- Class: Amphibia
- Order: Urodela
- Family: Plethodontidae
- Genus: Eurycea
- Species: E. tynerensis

Binomial name
- Eurycea tynerensis Moore & Hughes, 1939

= Oklahoma salamander =

Species of amphibian

The Oklahoma salamander (Eurycea tynerensis) is a salamander in the family Plethodontidae, endemic to the United States. The species was first described by George A. Moore and R. Chester Hughes in 1939. Its natural habitats are temperate forests, rivers, and freshwater springs. It is threatened by habitat loss.

== Parasites ==
As most animals, the Oklahoma salamander harbours several species of parasites. Among them, the polystomatid monogenean Sphyranura euryceae is a parasite of the gills of the adult salamander.
