= Blanco blind salamander =

Conservation status
- Data Deficient (IUCN 3.1)

- Critically Imperiled (NatureServe)

Scientific classification
- Kingdom: Animalia
- Phylum: Chordata
- Class: Amphibia
- Order: Urodela
- Family: Plethodontidae
- Genus: Eurycea
- Species: E. robusta

Binomial name
- Eurycea robusta (Longley, 1978)

Synonyms
- Typhlomolge robusta Longley, 1978

Species of amphibian

The Blanco blind salamander (Eurycea robusta) is a species of aquatic, lungless salamander native to the United States. It is endemic to a small region of the Blanco River near San Marcos in Hays County, Texas. Its habitat, deep in limestone karst, makes collecting specimens for research particularly problematic. It is known from only a single specimen, collected in the 1950s.

The Blanco blind salamander is considered a lost species with it being on Re:wilds Search For Lost Species initiative, as it is unknown whether it is still alive or not. Four specimens were discovered in 1951 by a gravel company digging in the dry bed of the Blanco River. Two were eaten by a heron, one was lost and the final specimen was sent to the University of Texas at Austin for research. Any extant members of the species are believed to live in the Edwards Aquifer. Researchers are using environmental DNA analysis to assess whether it still lives, but are hampered by the fact that no extant viable DNA samples exist. For that reason, they are using similar related species, such as the Texas blind salamander, as a proxy.

== Description ==
The Blanco blind salamander has a stout body, reduced eyes, robust limbs, and a thick tail with moderate fins. It differs from other species in its genus with vertebral number with it having 13 trunk vertebrae, disproportionate lateral expansion of elements of the anterior cranial, lack of ossified orbitosphenoids and a arcuate lateral outline of the mandible. The Blanco blind salamander grows to up to 100.8mm in length.
