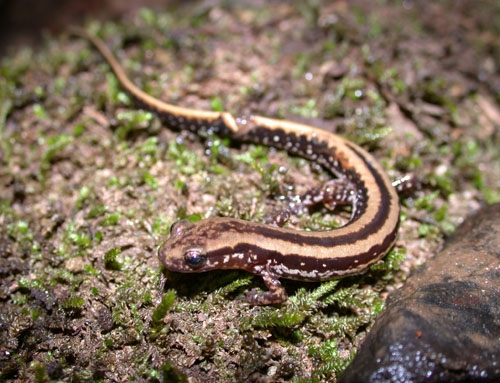

Conservation status
- Least Concern (IUCN 3.1)

- Secure (NatureServe)

Scientific classification
- Kingdom: Animalia
- Phylum: Chordata
- Class: Amphibia
- Order: Urodela
- Family: Plethodontidae
- Genus: Eurycea
- Species: E. guttolineata

Binomial name
- Eurycea guttolineata (Holbrook, 1838)

Synonyms
- Salamandra gutto-lineata Holbrook, 1838

= Three-lined salamander =

Species of amphibian

The three-lined salamander (Eurycea guttolineata) is a species of salamander in the family Plethodontidae. It is endemic to the south-eastern United States. This species was classified as a sub-species of long tailed salamanders until DNA sequencing revealed that there was no hybridization between the two species. Like other Plethodontidae species, E. guttolineata captures prey via tongue projection.

== Description ==
Eurycea guttolineata is a mid-sized, slender stream salamander which ranges from about 10-15.9 cm in its adult form. It is tan to light yellow with three black longitudinal stripes running from the eyes down the length of the body to the tail. They possess 13-14 costal grooves that aid in cutaneous respiration. The tail is very long at approximately two-thirds its total body length. Additionally, the ventrum (belly) of the three-lined salamander is boldly marked with black and white marbling.

== Reproduction ==
Breeding takes place in slow moving bogs and streams. Hatchlings are generally around 10-13 mm and undergo metamorphosis when they are 22-27 mm snout-to-vent length. Metamorphosis starts with the reduction of labial folds, formation of eyelids, and resorption of the tail-fin. Metamorphosis is then complete with loss of gills and gill slits, along with pigment changes. This is typically a 4-6 month larval stage. The effects that elevation has on larval stages have been studied extensively showing that at lower elevations larvae metamorphosized sooner than those at higher elevations which had delayed metamorphosis mostly due to overwintering. Due to this species being a semi-aquatic salamander in the Plethodontidae family, the females will enter cooler waters in late autumn and winter to drop eggs. Females lay clutch sizes averaging 12-14 eggs.

== Distribution ==
The species is distributed throughout much of the southeastern United States. It can be found in the Appalachian Mountains from Virginia and Tennessee south through the Carolinas, Georgia, Alabama, and Mississippi to the Gulf Coast, including eastern Louisiana and western Florida.

== Habitat ==
Its natural habitats are forested floodplains, ditches, streamsides, and seepages. With wet weather, the species may enter wooded terrestrial habitats. It is not uncommon in suitable habitat. Some subpopulations have likely been extirpated by loss of bottomland hardwood forests. E. guttolineata can fill ecological niches and use areas closer to roads than other species of salamanders.

== Feeding Behavior ==
Three-lined Salamanders feed on a variety of invertebrates including snails, snail eggs, arachnids, millipedes, annelids, nematodes, and many insects. Larvae are thought to feed on small invertebrates, but there have not been any detailed studies on their stomach content or foraging behavior. A study researching the effects of temperature showed that elastically powered tongue-projection performance is maintained to a higher degree than muscle-powered tongue retraction performance across a wide temperature range. Another study found that three-lined salamanders have slower burst speed in cold temperatures.
