= Comal blind salamander =

Conservation status
- Vulnerable (IUCN 3.1)

Scientific classification
- Kingdom: Animalia
- Phylum: Chordata
- Class: Amphibia
- Order: Urodela
- Family: Plethodontidae
- Genus: Eurycea
- Species: E. tridentifera

Binomial name
- Eurycea tridentifera Mitchell & Reddell, 1965

Synonyms
- Typhlomolge tridentifera Wake, 1966

Species of amphibian

The Comal blind salamander or Honey Creek Cave blind salamander (Eurycea tridentifera) is a small species of aquatic, lungless salamander native to the United States. It is endemic to a small region at the junction of Comal, Bexar and Kendall Counties in Texas. It is 1.5 to 3.0 in long, with a slender body and external gills, and is an overall translucent pink color.

The salamander depends on a constant supply of clean, cool water from the Edwards Aquifer. Hunting tiny snails, shrimp, and other aquatic invertebrates by sensing water pressure waves created by prey in the still underground waters where it lives.

== Conservation status ==
The Comal blind salamander is listed as a threatened species in the state of Texas. Due to its extremely limited geographic range, its primary threat is contamination of the water sources in the area.
