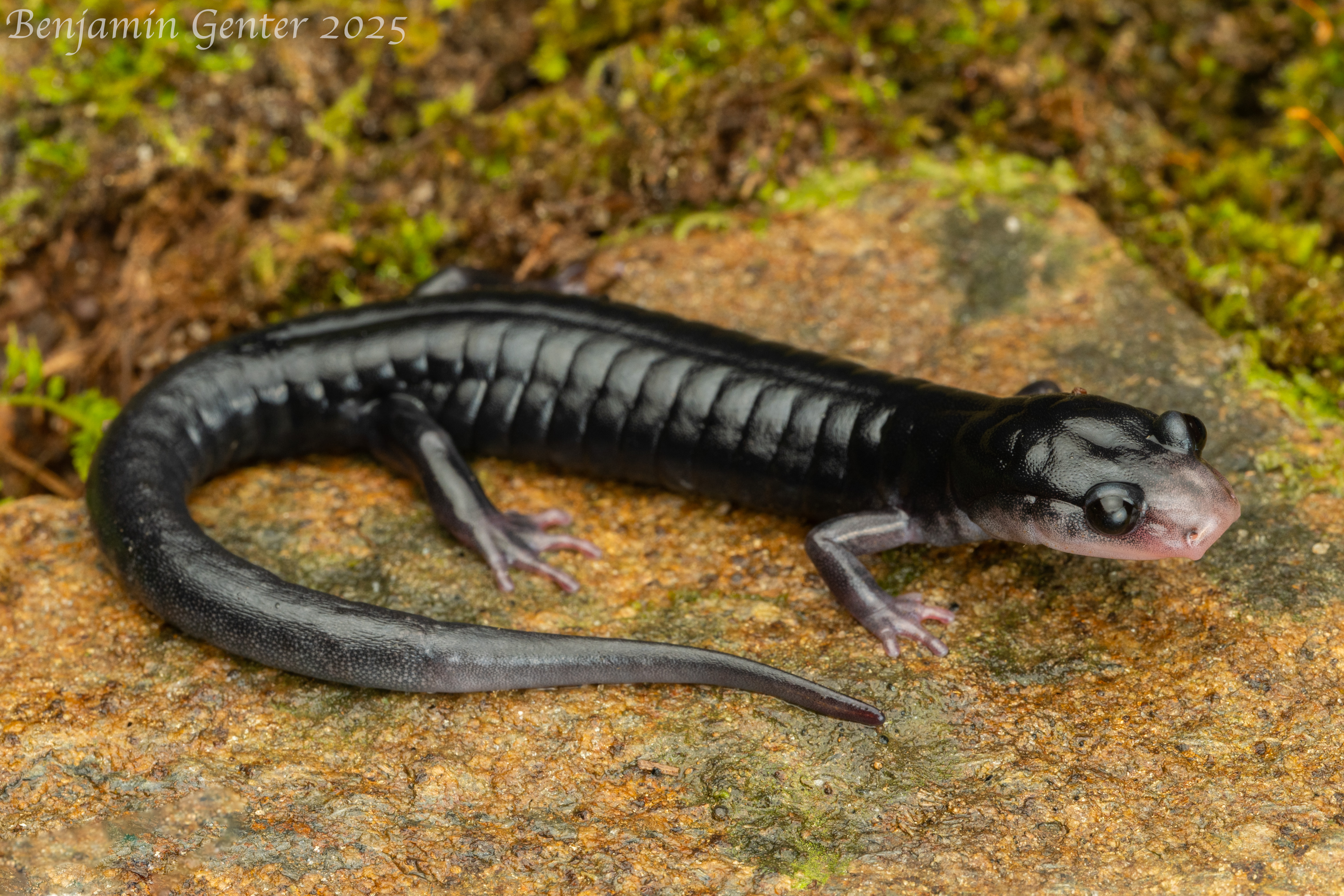

Conservation status
- Endangered (IUCN 3.1)

Scientific classification
- Kingdom: Animalia
- Phylum: Chordata
- Class: Amphibia
- Order: Urodela
- Family: Plethodontidae
- Genus: Plethodon
- Species: P. meridianus

Binomial name
- Plethodon meridianus Highton & Peabody, 2000

= South Mountain gray-cheeked salamander =

Species of amphibian

The South Mountain gray-cheeked salamander (Plethodon meridianus) is a species of salamander in the family Plethodontidae, endemic to the state of North Carolina in the United States, where it is only found in the South Mountains. It was formerly considered a variant of the red-cheeked salamander (P. jordani). Its natural habitat is temperate forests. It is threatened by habitat loss.
