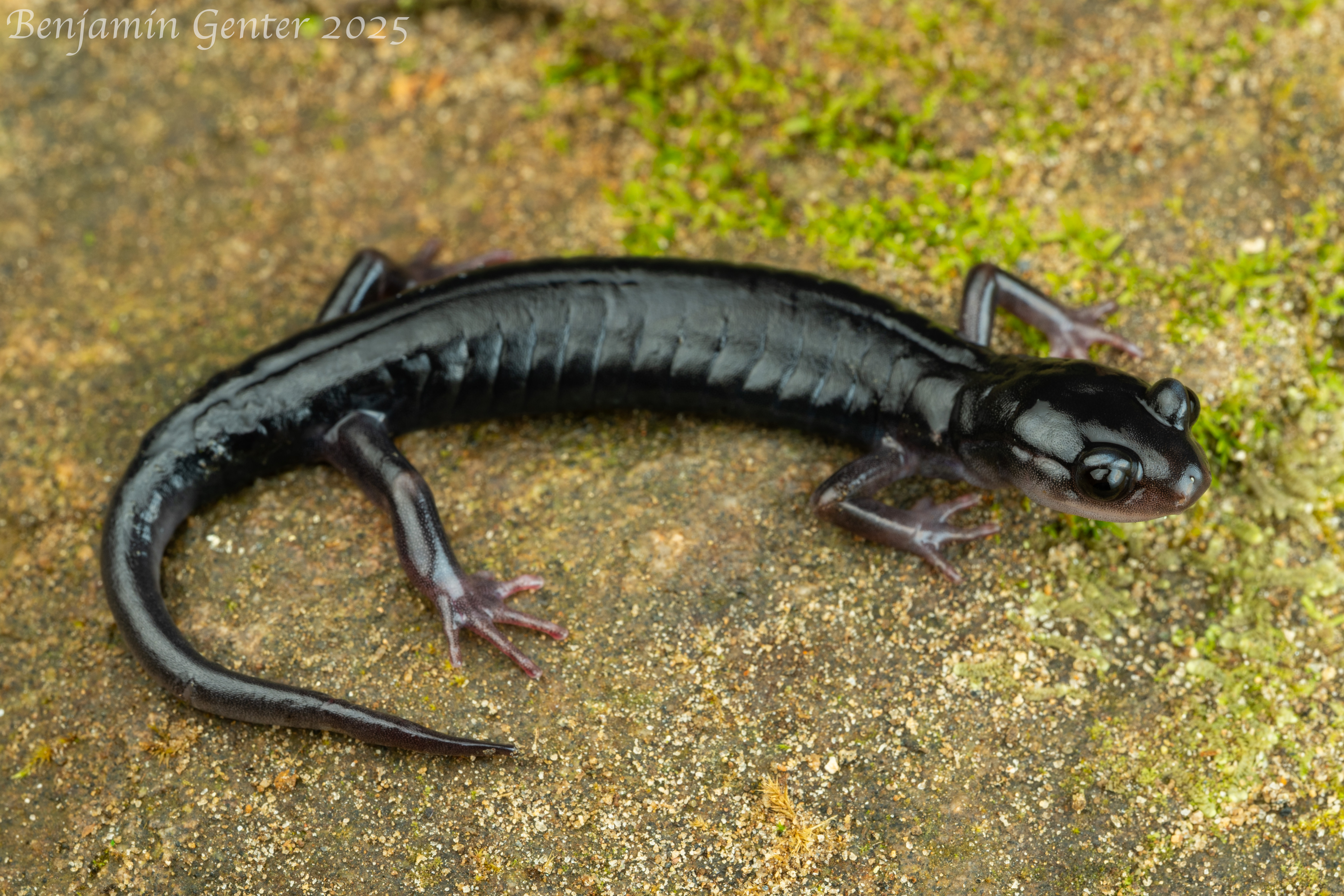

Conservation status
- Endangered (IUCN 3.1)

Scientific classification
- Kingdom: Animalia
- Phylum: Chordata
- Class: Amphibia
- Order: Urodela
- Family: Plethodontidae
- Genus: Plethodon
- Species: P. amplus

Binomial name
- Plethodon amplus Highton & Peabody, 2000

= Blue Ridge gray-cheeked salamander =

Species of amphibian

The Blue Ridge gray-cheeked salamander (Plethodon amplus) is a species of salamander in the family Plethodontidae endemic to the Blue Ridge Mountains of North Carolina, United States. It is one of 55 species in the genus Plethodon and one of the most recently to be described. Its natural habitat is temperate forests. It is threatened by habitat loss.

Studies have shown practices such as clearcutting are a leading cause of decline for the species.
