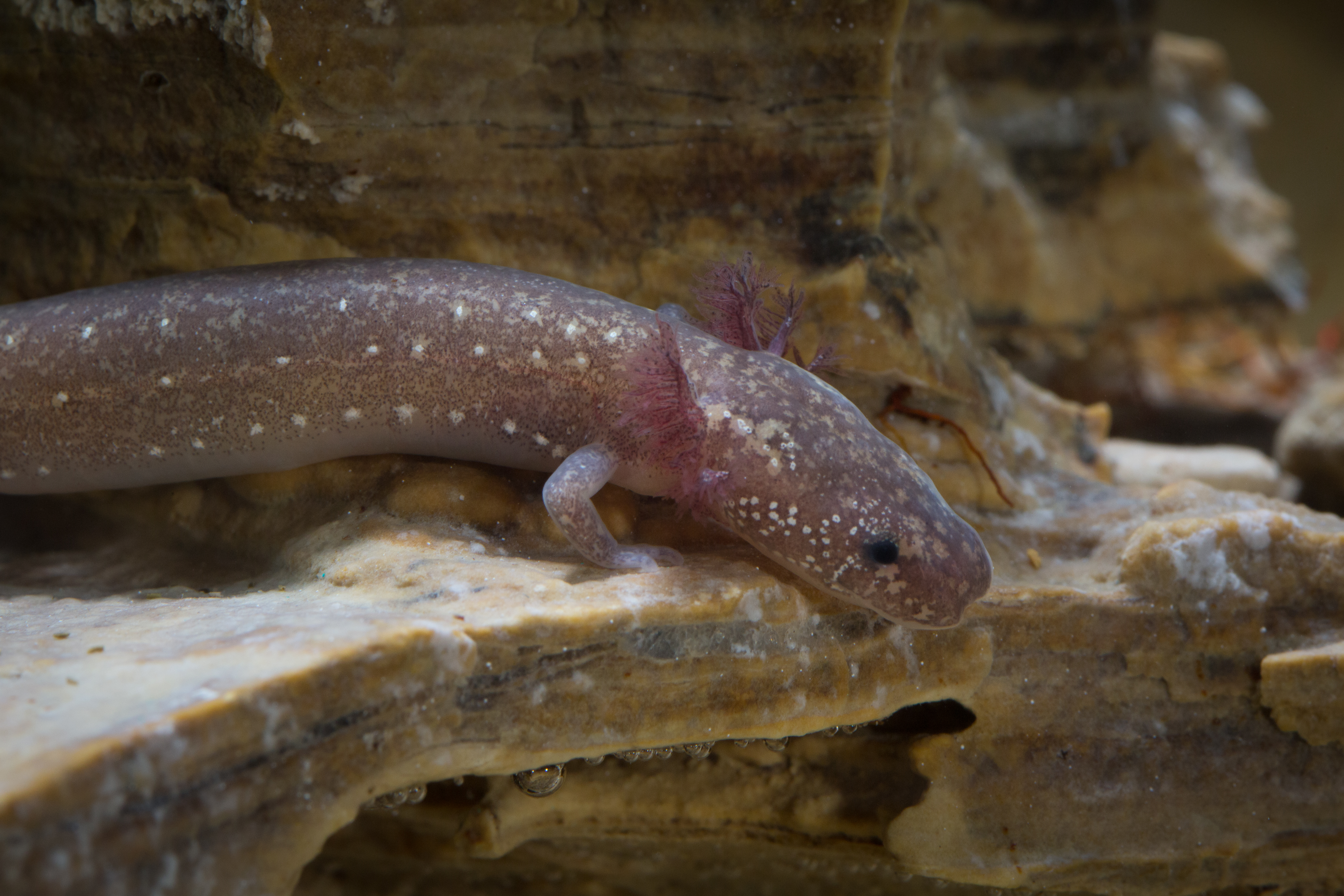

Conservation status
- Vulnerable (IUCN 3.1)

- Endangered (ESA)

Scientific classification
- Kingdom: Animalia
- Phylum: Chordata
- Class: Amphibia
- Order: Urodela
- Family: Plethodontidae
- Genus: Eurycea
- Species: E. sosorum

Binomial name
- Eurycea sosorum Chippindale, Price, and Hillis, 1993

= Barton Springs salamander =

Species of amphibian

The Barton Springs salamander (Eurycea sosorum) is an endangered lungless salamander. It is endemic to Texas, United States. It was first found in Barton Springs in Austin, but is now also known from other localities in the nearby Travis and Hays Counties. Barton Springs is located within Zilker Park which is situated in the Edwards Aquifer in Austin, Texas. Eliza Springs, located within Barton Springs, has one of the largest populations of Barton Springs salamanders.

== Habitat ==
The Barton Springs salamander prefers clear water and are typically found near openings of springs. These salamanders can also be found under rocks or gravel, within aquatic vegetation, and algae. Barton Springs salamanders can live in water depths ranging from 0.1 to 5 metres (0.33 to 16.40 ft). The springs in which these salamanders inhabit flow year-round and retain a constant temperature of around 20 °C (68 °F).

== Description ==
Barton Springs salamanders grow to approximately 6.4 centimetres (2.5 in) in total length and have mottled coloration varying from darkish purple to light yellow on their dorsal side. The variation in coloring is largely due to the presence or lack of melanophores, iridophores, and pigment gaps. The ventral side of the salamander is either a cream or translucent color which allows stomach contents and the presence of eggs to be visible. The ventral side of the tail has a yellow-orange stripe that extends from the cloaca to the end of the tail. They have a fairly small head with reduced eyes and a slender body with elongated limbs that indicate it occupies a semi-subterranean lifestyle. On either side of the salamander are three red gills with four fingers on the forelimbs and five toes on the hindlimbs. The Barton Springs salamander is an ectothermic species and displays bilateral symmetry.

== Reproduction ==
Barton Springs salamanders are dioecious, and females can hold up to 40 eggs at a time. The eggs are about 1.5 mm in diameter, surrounded by a jelly-like layer, and are deposited in a cluster on various substrates year-round. In captivity, Barton Springs salamanders display a tail-straddling walk during reproduction. Spermatophores deposited by males on substrate are stored by the female in a spermatheca. The fertilization of their eggs is consistent with most salamanders, which utilize internal fertilization in which sperm are released onto the eggs as they pass through the female reproductive tract.

== Environmental impact ==
Amphibian species worldwide have been in decline due to climate change including but not limited to: increased UV radiation, change in precipitation, and various pathogen outbreaks (chytrid fungus which causes Chytridiomycosis). However, habitat destruction, degradation, and pollution on a local scale have resulted mainly from land and urbanization near the Barton Creek watershed. Due to the species having a small population and the degradation of its habitat, the Barton Springs salamander is vulnerable to extinction. In addition, aquatic vegetation has been shown to be a critical component to the salamander's habitat; their numbers dropped precipitously after the removal of much of the vegetation from Barton Springs and have recovered after habitat restoration programs were implemented. These changes, in turn, affect, among others, water quality/quantity and biological community composition of rivers and water systems in the surrounding environment. The Texas Water Commission has also indicated that the Barton Springs aquifer is the most vulnerable to pollution within the state of Texas. The wide effects of contamination and degradation on these water systems make analyzing their specific sources difficult since the interactions of factors and overlapping effects may occur. Nonetheless, it is important to study these consequences so that future impact on this and other species may be reduced.

=== Oxygen absorption ===
Dissolved oxygen (DO) is required at specific levels to maintain healthy aquatic life. To do this, "national ambient water quality criteria" have been set by the U.S. Environmental Protection Agency and measurements have been made since 1969, albeit inconsistently. Hypoxia, a state of reduced oxygen, may hinder embryonic and fetal development as well as decrease oxygen consumption in adults. Apart from prenatal developments, physiological responses may also arise from a lack of oxygen. Some of the known responses include "Increases in heart rate and buccal pumping, behavioral hypothermia, and gill hypertrophy".

Since this species is an obligate aquatic neotene that retains its gills through its adult life, it must absorb oxygen through its gills or skin. However, the method in which it performs this absorption has yet to be determined. One study found that when presented with a low DO level, this salamander increases its body movement. They theorized two explanations for this reaction:

1. low and high DO levels may be found relatively close, therefore movement will allow this species to migrate to a higher DO environment,
2. the physical movement causes a decrease between boundary layers adjacent to skin and gills, which allows for greater flow of oxygen.

== Diet and behavior ==
Much of the Barton Springs salamander's life history remains unknown at this time. These salamanders are neotenic and strictly an aquatic species. This species of salamanders typically inhabits surface waters but are also suited to live in subterranean waters when conditions are not suitable at the surface. Barton Springs salamanders utilize innate predator recognition and are opportunistic feeders. It appears that they feed primarily on small aquatic crustaceans and planarian flatworms (Dugesia sp.), but can supplement their diet with other items, such as earthworms, snails, leeches, and insect larvae.

== Etymology ==
The species epithet (sosorum) is an acronym for "Save Our Springs Ordinance" (of the City of Austin) although it is widely if erroneously believed to refer to SOS Alliance, a local preservation group combined with a Latin genitive plural ending.

== Conservation status ==
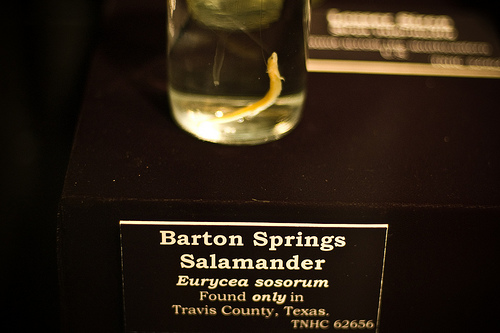
Preserved specimen

Despite inhabiting an urban area, E. sosorum was not described until 1993. It was put on the federal List of Threatened and Endangered Species in 1997 and was last assessed in 2004 by the IUCN Red List. Under the IUCN Red List, the Barton Springs salamander is listed as vulnerable while in federally and within the state of Texas the species is considered endangered. The salamander's listing prevented the City of Austin from cleaning the Barton Springs Pool as it had for 70 years—with bleach. As a result, the City of Austin applied for and was issued an Incidental Take Permit under Section 10(a)(1)(b) of the Endangered Species Act by the U.S. Fish and Wildlife Service in 1998. The permit has a term of 15 years and allows incidental taking of salamanders during pool cleaning and maintenance. In addition, various conservation measures have been developed under the "Barton Springs Salamander Conservation and Agreement Strategy" which was signed in August 1996. A captive breeding program was also developed for this species as a way to increase the size of the current population. As a mitigation measure, the City offered to direct 10% of revenue generated through pool entry fees into a conservation fund that is used for research and habitat enhancement. Looking forward, the city of Austin has created an advisory team that will continue to review pool maintenance procedures in the salamander's habitat and conduct monthly surveys to assess population size.
