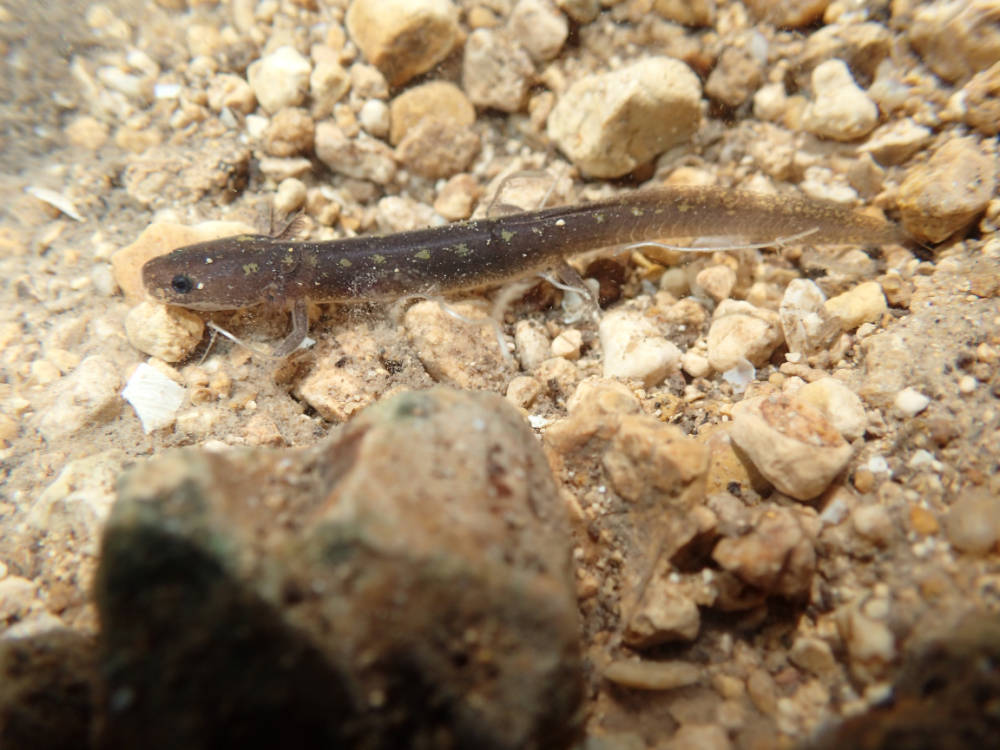

Conservation status
- Endangered (IUCN 3.1)

- Critically Imperiled (NatureServe)

Scientific classification
- Kingdom: Animalia
- Phylum: Chordata
- Class: Amphibia
- Order: Urodela
- Family: Plethodontidae
- Genus: Eurycea
- Species: E. chisholmensis

Binomial name
- Eurycea chisholmensis Chippindale, Price, Wiens, and Hillis, 2000
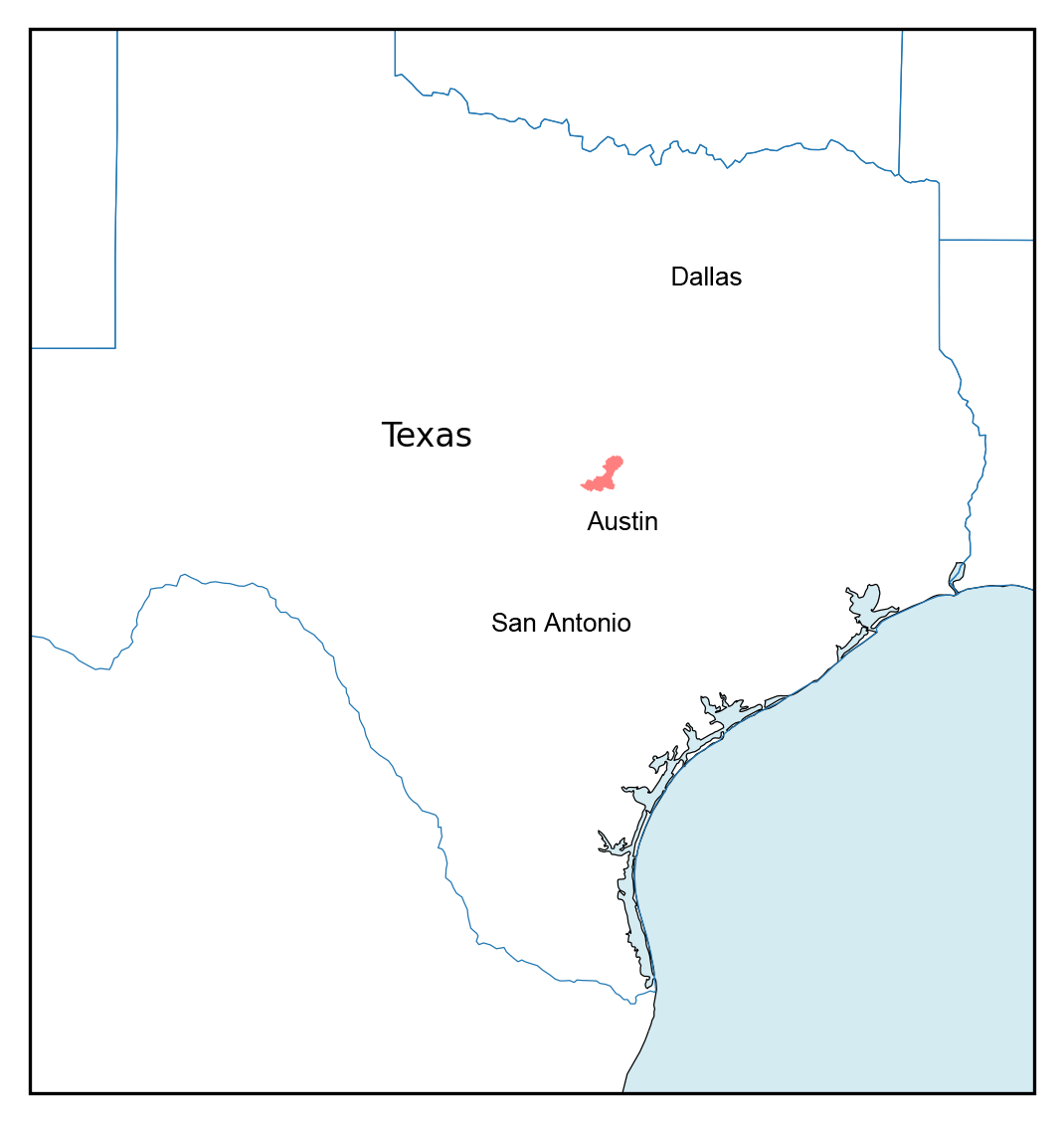
- Salado salamander range

= Salado Springs salamander =

Species of amphibian

The Salado Springs salamander (Eurycea chisholmensis) is a species of salamander in the family Plethodontidae. It is endemic to the vicinity of Salado, Texas.

Its natural habitat is freshwater springs. It has been found only from a few springs that feed Salado Creek in Bell County, Texas. These springs were important along the historical Chisholm Trail, from which the name of the species is derived.

In 2014, it was listed under the Endangered Species Act with Threatened status. It is threatened by habitat loss.
