= Eurycea neotenes =

Texas salamander

Conservation status
- Endangered (IUCN 3.1)

- Critically Imperiled (NatureServe)

Scientific classification
- Kingdom: Animalia
- Phylum: Chordata
- Class: Amphibia
- Order: Urodela
- Family: Plethodontidae
- Genus: Eurycea
- Species: E. neotenes

Binomial name
- Eurycea neotenes Bishop & Wright, 1937

Species of amphibian

Eurycea neotenes, also known as the Texas salamander, Bexar County salamander, Edwards Plateau salamander, or Texas neotenic salamander, is a species of entirely aquatic, lungless salamander native to the United States. It is endemic to central Texas, near Helotes, in Bexar County.

== Description ==
The Texas salamander grows from 2 to 4 in (5.1 to 10.2 cm) in length. It is brown in color, often with yellow or brown mottling, with light-yellow spotting down its back. It is neotenic, with a slender body, short limbs, and bright-red external gills. The Texas salamander lives in caves, which resulted in reduced vision in its eyes, due to the long period of time in darkness. It is akin to the Texas blind salamander Eurycea rathbuni.

== Diet ==
The Texas salamander has reduced vision or can be completely blind, which makes it difficult to hunt for food. It hunts by swishing its head side to side to create water pressure waves and sensing their prey break the still water. The Texas salamander typically preys on amphipods, blind shrimp (Palaemonetes antrorum), daphnia, small snails and other invertebrates.
