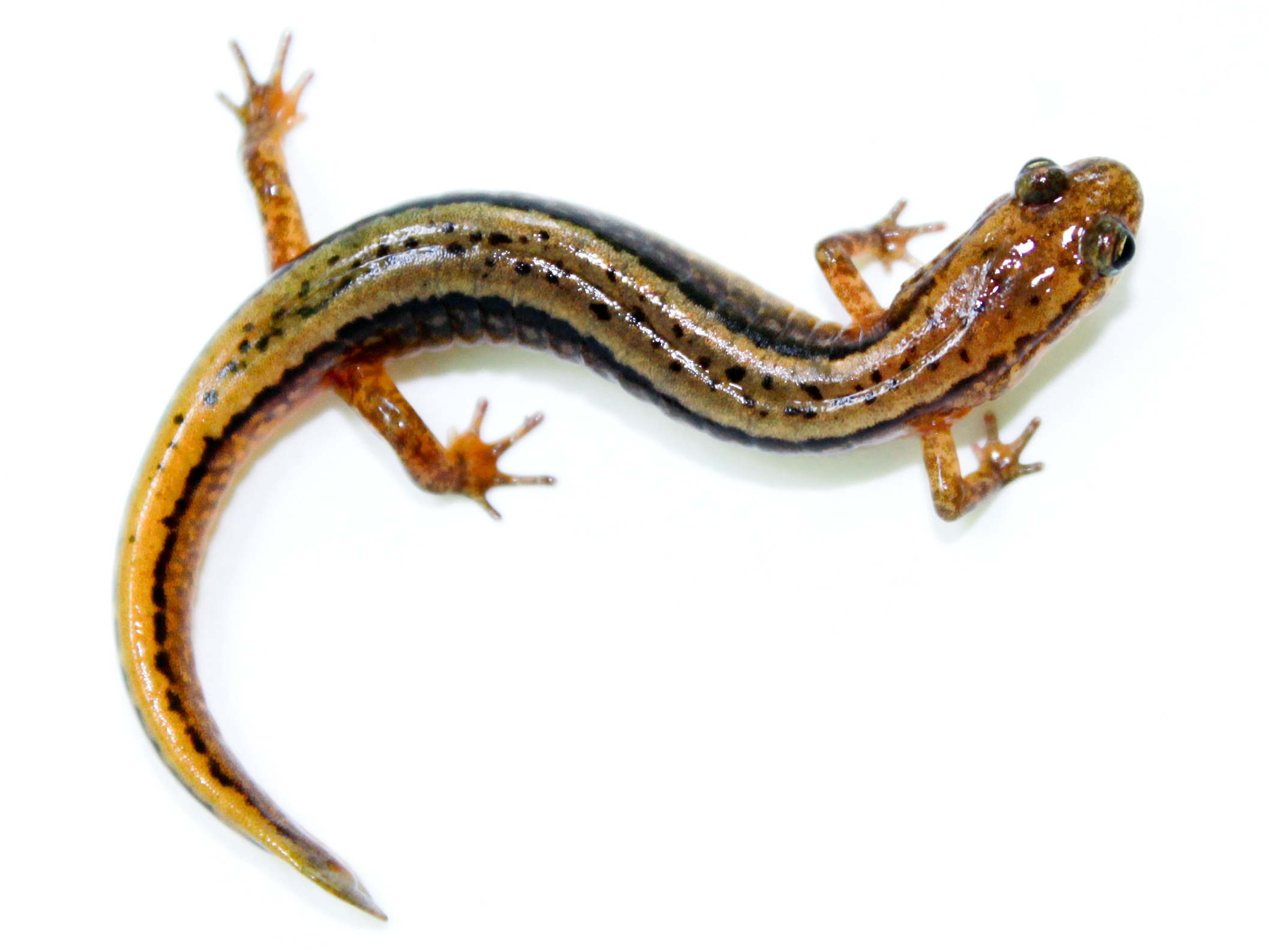

Conservation status
- Least Concern (IUCN 3.1)

- Secure (NatureServe)

Scientific classification
- Kingdom: Animalia
- Phylum: Chordata
- Class: Amphibia
- Order: Urodela
- Family: Plethodontidae
- Genus: Eurycea
- Species: E. bislineata

Binomial name
- Eurycea bislineata (Green, 1818)
- Range of E. bislineata

Synonyms
- Salamandra bislineata; Spelerpes bislineatus; Pseudotriton bilineatus

= Northern two-lined salamander =

Species of amphibian

The northern two-lined salamander (Eurycea bislineata) is a species of salamander in the family Plethodontidae found in Canada and the United States. Its natural habitats are temperate forests, temperate shrubland, rivers, intermittent rivers, freshwater marshes, freshwater springs, arable land, and urban areas. It is more water-oriented than the related northern redback salamander, and can often be found in and around water such as rain puddles, streams, swamps, and damp stream beds, whereas the northern redback tends to be found in damp ground, but usually not near open water.

== Description ==
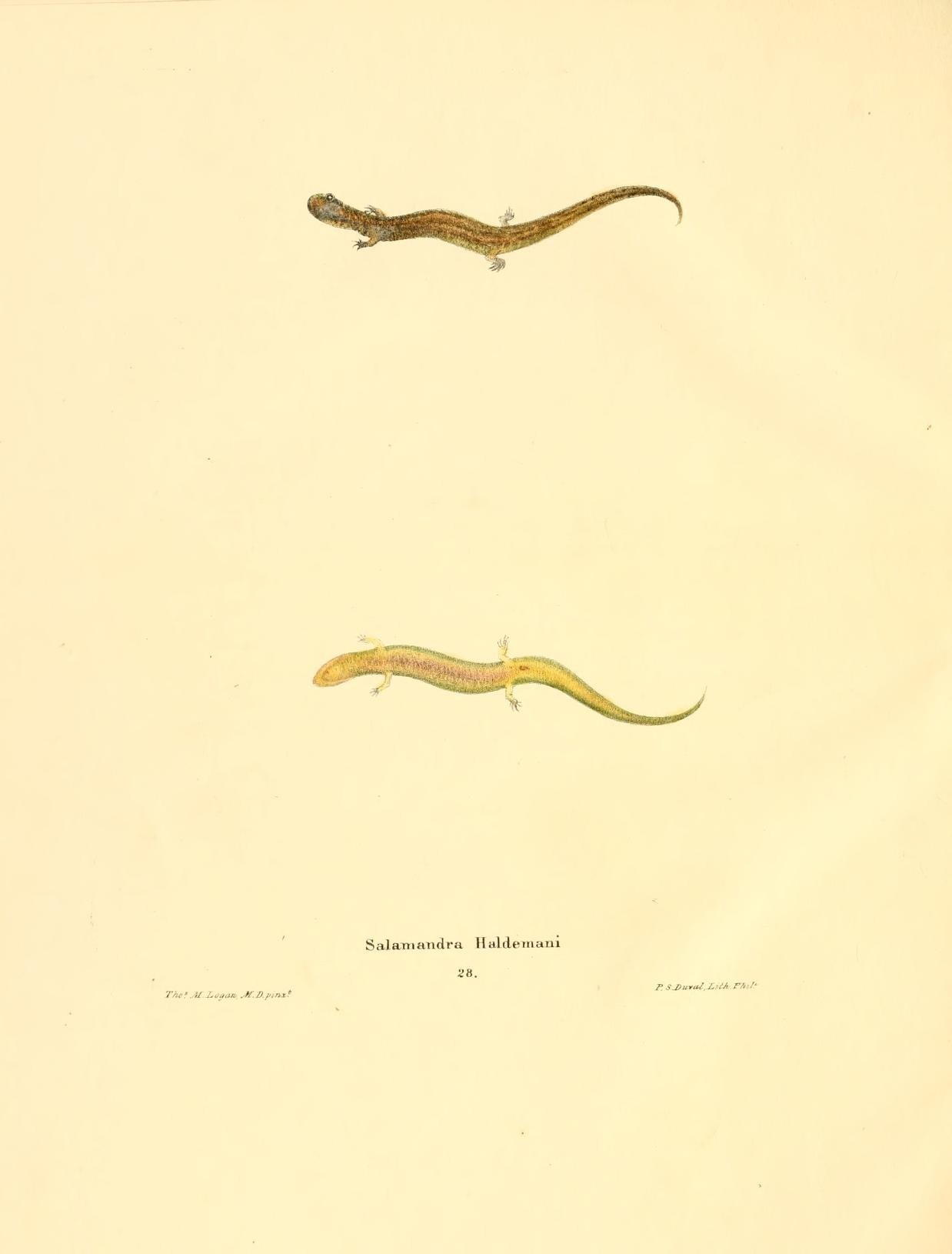
Illustration of Salamandra bislineata now known as E. bislineata.

The northern two-lined salamander is a small salamander, with adults ranging from 65–120 mm in total length. This salamander is yellow or yellowish-brown, with two black stripes running down the back which tends to break up after the base of the tail. The flanks are mottled grayish or brown. The belly is pale yellowish, nearly transparent. There are four toes on the fore feet and five toes on the hind feet. On the side of the body are 14–16 costal grooves.

== Habitat and distribution ==
This species prefers small rocky streams or seeps in forests, but may occur in moist areas far from running water. Also, some data suggest this species may be found on stony shores of small lakes and rivers. Northern two-lined salamanders are found throughout northeastern North America, ranging from central and southern Quebec, New Brunswick, northeastern Ontario, and the northeastern United States, from central Virginia and Ohio northwards to the Great Lakes. Compared to many other species in the genus Eurycea, E. bislineata has a large geographic distribution.

== Reproduction ==
The reproductive strategy of the northern two-lined salamander begins with an elaborate courtship. It may take place from September (in the southern parts of its range) to May (in the north). Observations of courtship in the species were made based on individuals held in captivity by Noble (1929), and a summary of these observations are: the male becomes restless, as if searching for a female. Upon finding the female, he will lift her by pushing his snout under her cloacal region or chest. The male adopts a distinct posture, bending his body laterally around her snout. The pair may remain in this position for an hour or more. The female eventually slips out of this posture and begins to straddle the male's tail with her fore limbs, while pressing her chin against the base of the male's tail. The male may undulate his tail from side to side in a slow and exaggerated manner, and the female moves her head from side to side, alternately from the male's tail. This tail-straddling walk may last for over an hour, at which point the male deposits a spermatophore, leading the female to walk over it, at which time she may either accept or reject the male's sperm. The spermatophore of this species is described as conical, 2.5 mm in height and with a colorless stalk that tapers towards the tip.

This species exhibits sexual dimorphism in the shape of the premaxillary teeth. The teeth of breeding males are unicuspid and elongated when compared to the shorter bicuspid teeth of the females. These enlarged teeth are used to help abrade the female's skin and introduce the secretions on the males mental gland, found on the chin, into her circulatory system, which stimulates her to mate. Prior to egg laying, the female searches for a suitable oviposition site in the stream. Nest sites are frequently under rocks, sometimes logs, and perhaps vegetation. Research done in the Georgia Piedmont on the closely related E. cirrigera, indicate that 65% of nests found were under cobbles (2.5 to 30 cm), 16% were under boulders (greater that 30 cm), and 19% were under slate tiles (30x30x1 cm), which were added to the stream experimentally. To deposit eggs on the under surface of a rock, the female must flip on her back to make cloacal contact with the substrate. Three minutes is required to lay each egg in this manner, and up to several hours to lay an entire clutch. The eggs, when freshly laid appear white or pale yellowish, and each egg is 2.5–3 mm in diameter and is surrounded by two distinct membranes. Communal nesting in northern two-lined salamanders has been documented on several occasions and localities; New York, in Ontario, and likely in Ohio.

== Larval ecology ==
Upon hatching, the gilled larvae are about 10 mm long, and remain in slow-moving pools, or less frequently, hiding in crevices between rocks and boulders in swift-flowing streams. The larvae do not begin feeding until their yolk sacs are reabsorbed, at which point they begin to feed on benthic invertebrates by prowling the bottom of the stream. Typical prey items for northern two-lined salamander larvae include chironomid larvae and other dipteran larvae, stonefly larvae, cladocera, and copepods. Predators of the larvae are many, such as fish, crayfish, and other salamander larvae, such as the larger northern spring salamander (Gyrinophilus porphyriticus). The larval period of E. bislineata is variable depending on latitude. In the southern portion of their range, such as New York, metamorphosis occurs at 50 mm total length or two years old, while further north, such as in Quebec and likely Ontario, metamorphosis takes place at nearly 70 mm total length, or three years old. The larvae over-winter in deeper pools not prone to freezing.

== Adult ecology ==
Once the larvae reach their maximum size, metamorphosis occurs. Sexual maturity is reached in this species at three to four years old. The adults and juveniles tend to be restricted to the stream edges, hiding under rocks and other debris during the day. Seasonal migration does occur, but not all individuals undertake them. Research done in Quebec suggests a postbreeding migration into the forest occurs in June. These adult salamanders may move over 100 m from the stream. The second migration is that of the newly metamorphosed juveniles leaving the stream, but they tend to remain closer to it. About 75% of individuals dispersing over 100 m into the forest did not return, and they were believed to have been consumed by predators. The majority of above-ground movements are made after dark and in wet weather. The diets of the adults are more wide-ranging than the larvae because of the amount of habitat that can be exploited, both terrestrial and aquatic. The movements of juveniles and adults usually occurs in the first hour after dark, when they emerge from under their retreats and forage along the stream bank or forest floor. Food items recorded include wood roaches, arachnids, worms, isopods, millipedes, centipedes, beetles, snails, springtails, flies, hymenopterans, sowbugs, midges, mayflies, annelids, stonefly nymphs, caddisfly larvae, thrips and rarely trout fry. Adult population densities are variable by habitat quality. Adults are also territorial, so if resources are scarce, the population is less dense. In some populations, densities are as low as 0.02-0.04 animals/m^{2}. In other areas, localized densities can be as high as 11 individuals /m^{2}. Adults overwinter up to 80 cm deep into the soil of the stream bank in cold climates, but may remain somewhat active in southern regions, and may continue feeding during this period.

== Predators and defense ==
Because of its small size and localized distribution around streams, the northern two-lined salamander is preyed upon by a variety of animals. Predators include birds, such as the eastern screech owl (Otus asio), snakes such as the eastern garter snakes (Thamnophis sirtalis) and ringneck snakes (Diadophis punctatus). Other important predators of the northern two-lined salamander larvae are other salamanders, such as the large, stream-dwelling larvae of the northern spring salamander (Gyrinophilus porphyriticus) and the blackbelly salamander (Desmognathus quadramaculatus). Response to a predator is variable in E. bislineata . Some individuals, when confronted with a garter snake, will remain motionless when contacted by the head of the snake, but would engage in a protean flip, where the tail is held over the body when contacted by the snake's tongue. Tail autotomy is common in E. bislineata , as a result of a struggle with a predator. Losing part of the tail increases the likelihood of surviving the encounter with a predator. In some populations, up to 32% of animals had autotomized tails.
