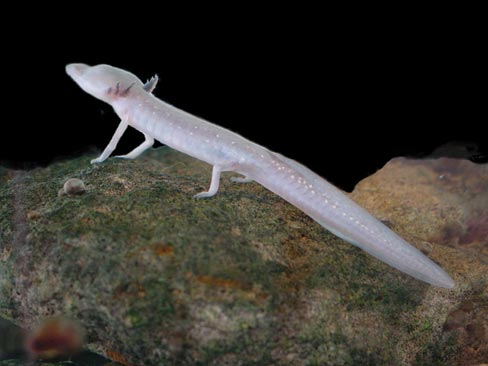

Conservation status
- Critically Endangered (IUCN 3.1)

- Endangered (ESA)

Scientific classification
- Kingdom: Animalia
- Phylum: Chordata
- Class: Amphibia
- Order: Urodela
- Family: Plethodontidae
- Genus: Eurycea
- Species: E. rathbuni

Binomial name
- Eurycea rathbuni (Stejneger, 1896)

Synonyms
- Typhlomolge rathbuni Stejneger, 1896

= Texas blind salamander =

Species of amphibian

The Texas blind salamander (Eurycea rathbuni) is a rare and endangered cave-dwelling troglobite amphibian native to San Marcos, Hays County, Texas, specifically the San Marcos Pool of the Edwards Aquifer. This species resembles the olm, another stygofaunal salamander from Europe. Its body is less elongated than the olm's, and it has more digits on each limb: four on the front limbs and five on the back, while the olm has three and two respectively.

== Description ==
The species has a broad, flat snout and head, and vestigial eyes beneath that are covered by skin. This species' vestigial eyes contain an optic nerve, but are less developed than those of other species in the Eurycea, often lacking important features like lenses and well-defined retinas associated with image-forming vision. Similar to other cave-dwelling salamanders, this species has numerous neuromasts in their lateral line that detect mechanical stimuli in the environment. Many of these neuromasts express the PAX6 protein, which is often expressed during eye development of other salamander species. These neuromasts are thought to play an important role in navigation and prey detection for this species with reduced visual capacity. Like other neotenous salamanders, it has external gills for absorbing oxygen from the water. The salamander's mature length is around 13 cm (5 in). The forelimbs carry four digits and the hind limbs possess five digits. The species is found to be able to regenerate its tail and limbs if they are lost. Its diet varies by what flows into its cave, and includes blind shrimp (Palaemonetes antrorum), snails, and amphipods. It is not known if this salamander has any natural predators, however the stygobitic catfish Satan eurystomus also lives in Edwards Aquifer, so is a potential predator. However, due to the limited range of that fish, it might not come into contact with the amphibian.

== Distribution and habitat ==
Specimens have been collected at seven localities in the Purgatory Creek system and along the San Marcos Fault near San Marcos, Texas. Adults and immature larvae are well-adapted for living in underground streams or deep pools in caves, and many probably inhabit deep recesses that are not accessible to collectors. The deep pools are cool environments nearly constantly staying at 21–22 °C (70–72 °F) with a minimal current. It is a unique ground system hundreds of feet below Earth's surface. The first specimens of this species were collected in 1895 from a newly constructed well that drew water from 58 metres (190 ft) below the surface.

== Breeding and courtship ==
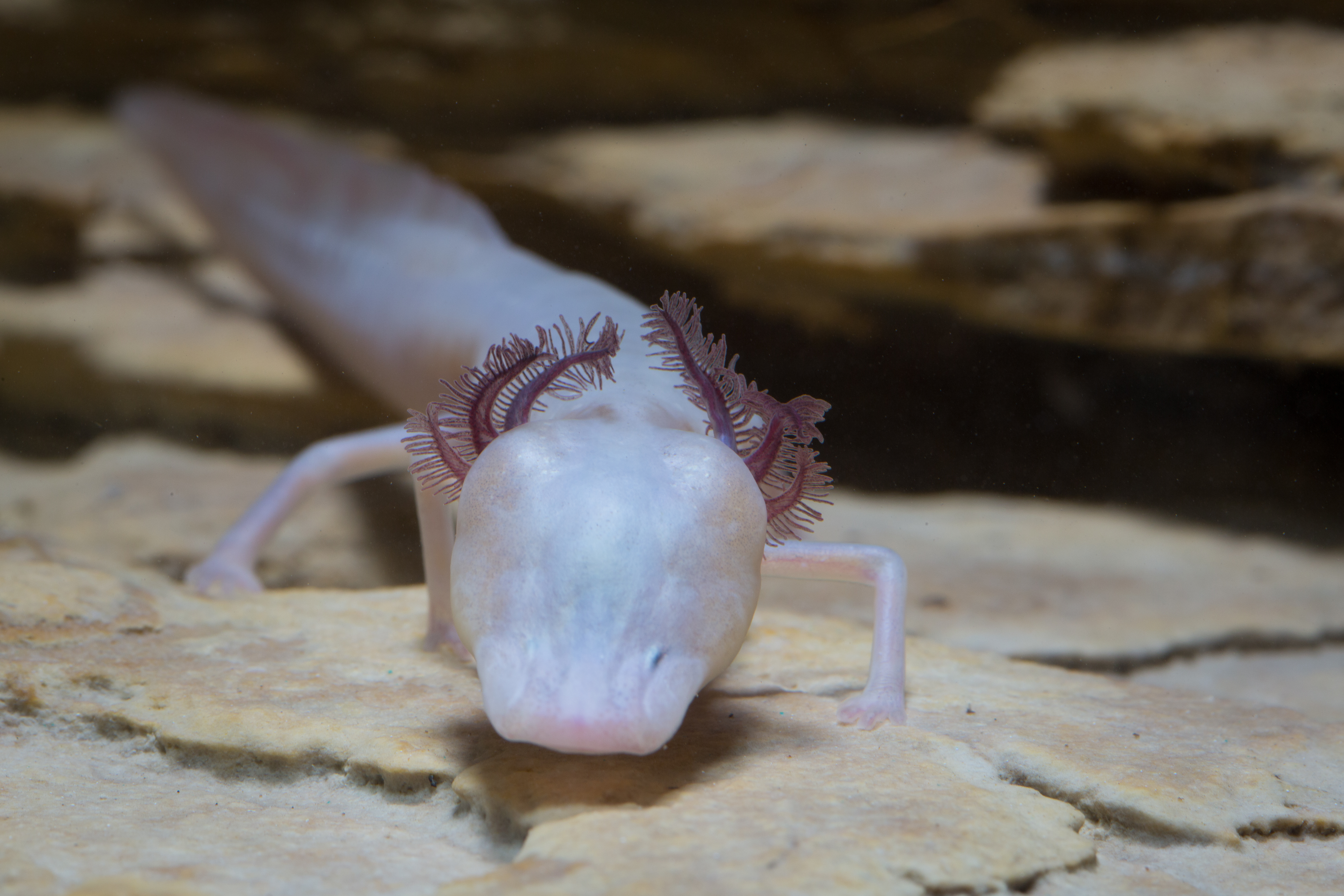
A Texas blind salamander

The time of breeding is poorly documented. Dunn (1926) noted a specimen maintained in the laboratory laid a few eggs on March 15 and a specimen collected in early fall had the spermatheca packed with spermatozoa. Very small juveniles have been found throughout the year, suggesting a seasonal breeding pattern.

Bechler (1988) observed one complete and two partial courtship bouts in captive specimens in which the female initiated courtship and the male remained passive initially. Courtship begins when the female approaches the male and rubs her chin on his dorsum. The female may also rub her cloaca on nearby rocks while rocking to and fro. If the male does not respond, the female may nip the male along the sides or engage in kicking behavior in which gravel is scratched with the hind limbs. The female eventually straddles the tail of the male and rubs her snout above the tail base. The male responds by arching his pelvic region and fanning his tail between her legs.

The female then rubs her snout more rapidly over the base of the tail. The male may lead the female forward and repeat the same cycle while slowly vibrating the anterior third of the tail. The male eventually bends the body laterally and moves the tail laterally at a right angle to the body while the female continues rubbing the base of the tail. The male then leads the female forward, bends his body into an S-shaped pattern, and deposits a spermatophore on the substrate. He next leads the female forward with the tail extended laterally until she picks up the spermatophore cap with her cloacal lips. The spermatophore consists of a crescent-shaped white sperm cap over a clear, gelatinous base that is about four times longer than it is wide. The species is found to have a delayed reproductive maturity and low reproductive output, with females found to produce 5 small egg clutches on average per year.

== Conservation ==
Populations of Texas blind salamander are sensitive to harsh changes in their environment. Continuous pumping of groundwater for commercial or domestic purposes leaves the salamanders vulnerable to predators and can eventually lead to their extinction. The Edwards Aquifer is becoming polluted from stormwater runoff and chemical spills. Potential drought is also a primary concern. Long-term groundwater availability is being monitored using the flow of the San Marcos River as a surrogate measure.

The salamanders were listed as an endangered species on March 11th, 1967, and their population status continues to be unstable. Recovery plans are currently underway to help save the species. The Edwards Aquifer Habitat Conservation Plan (EAHCP) is a program designed to help these organisms thrive. The EAHCP is taking action by preserving, restoring, and monitoring water sources.

Other efforts to stabilize this population are public education on the effects of overconsumption of water and pollution. Overconsumption of water and pollution causes decline in habitual environments for species like the Texas blind salamander.

== See also ==
- Axolotl
- Blanco blind salamander
- Olm
