= David Hillis =

American evolutionary biologist

David Mark Hillis
- Born: December 21, 1958 (age 67); Copenhagen, Denmark
- Education: Baylor University; University of Kansas
- Scientific career
- Fields: Biology
- Workplaces: University of Texas at Austin

David Mark Hillis (born December 21, 1958) is an American evolutionary biologist, and the Alfred W. Roark Centennial Professor of Biology at the University of Texas at Austin. He is best known for his studies of molecular evolution, phylogeny, and vertebrate systematics. He created the popular Hillis Plot depiction of the evolutionary tree of life.

== Early life ==
David Hillis was born in Copenhagen, Denmark in 1958, the son of William Hillis, an epidemiologist, and Aryge Briggs Hillis, a biostatistician. Hillis lived his early years in Denmark, Belgian Congo, India, and the United States, where he developed his interests in biology and biodiversity. He has two sons, Erec and Jonathan. His younger son, Jonathan Hillis, served in 2011 as the National Chief of the Order of the Arrow, the Honor Society of the Boy Scouts of America. His brother is computer scientist W. Daniel Hillis, and his sister is Argye E. Hillis, a professor of neurology at Johns Hopkins University.

== Education and research ==
In 1980 Hillis graduated from Baylor University with a B.S. degree in biology, followed in 1983, 1984, and 1985 with M.S., Ph.M., and Ph.D. degrees in Biological Science from the University of Kansas, specializing in molecular evolution and systematics. During this time Hillis developed molecular approaches for reconstructing the evolutionary history of organisms, or phylogeny, with a particular emphasis on the relationships of amphibians. He also made significant contributions to the understanding of hybridization, molecular processes of evolutionary change, and statistical analysis of biological phylogenies. He continued this research as an assistant professor at the University of Miami from 1985 to 1987, and then moved to the faculty of the University of Texas at Austin in 1987.

Hillis received a Presidential Young Investigator Award from the National Science Foundation that same year, and was named to the Alfred W. Roark Centennial Professorship in Natural Sciences by the University of Texas in 1992. His co-authored book Molecular Systematics was instrumental in developing the field of phylogenetic analysis, and he is a co-author of two of the leading college textbooks on biology (Life: The Science of Biology , and Principles of Life ). Dr. Hillis was the recipient of a MacArthur Fellowship in 1999. In 2000, Hillis was elected to the American Academy of Arts and Sciences, and in 2008, he was elected a member of the United States National Academy of Sciences. He has served as president of the Society for the Study of Evolution, and President of the Society of Systematic Biologists. At the University of Texas, he has served as Director of the School of Biological Sciences, Director of the Center for Computational Biology and Bioinformatics, Director of the Dean's Scholars Honors Program of the College of Natural Sciences, and as Chair of the Faculty Council. Hillis also owns and operates the Double Helix Ranch, where he raises Texas Longhorn Cattle.

== Honors ==
Several species of reptiles and amphibians are named in honor of Hillis, including a species of salamander, Hillis's Dwarf Salamander, (Eurycea hillisi), from the southeastern United States; a species of frog, Hillis's Stream Treefrog (Hyloscirtus hillisi), from Ecuador; a species of frog, Hillis's Bush Frog (Raorchestes hillisi), from China; a species of lizard, Hillis's Sticklizard (Pholidobolus hillisi), from Ecuador; and a species of frog, the Acapulco Leopard Frog (Rana hillisi), from Mexico.
