= Cave salamander =

Cave-dwelling amphibian

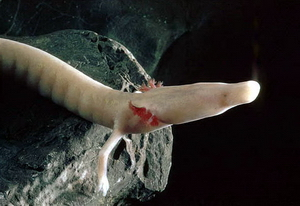
The olm (Proteus anguinus) of the western Balkan Peninsula.

A cave salamander is a type of salamander that primarily or exclusively inhabits caves, a group that includes several species. Some of these animals have developed special, even extreme, adaptations to their subterranean environments. Some species have only rudimentary (or even absent) eyes (blind salamanders). Others lack pigmentation, rendering them a pale yellowish or pinkish color (e.g., Eurycea rathbuni).

With the notable exception of the olm (Proteus anguinus), all "cave salamanders" are members of the family Plethodontidae ("lungless salamanders"). Almost all of them are paedomorphic and therefore never undergo metamorphosis, but it is not clear if this happened before or after they adapted to an existence in caves, as some species that do not live in caves are also paedomorphic.

== History ==
The first dedicated scientific study of a cave animal was focused upon a cave salamander, Proteus anguinus. It was originally identified as a "dragon's larva" by Johann Weikhard von Valvasor in 1689. Later, the Austrian naturalist Joseph Nicolaus Lorenz described it scientifically in 1768.

Another early scientific description of a cave salamander was undertaken by Constantine Samuel Rafinesque in 1822 while he was a professor of botany and natural history at Transylvania University in Lexington, Kentucky. The species he described was known to the locals as a "cave puppet" and is now known to be Eurycea lucifuga. His discovery was not surprising at the time because E. lucifuga lives near the entrance of caves, making an in-depth exploration unnecessary. Additionally, E. lucifuga is neither blind nor depigmented.

== List of cave salamanders ==
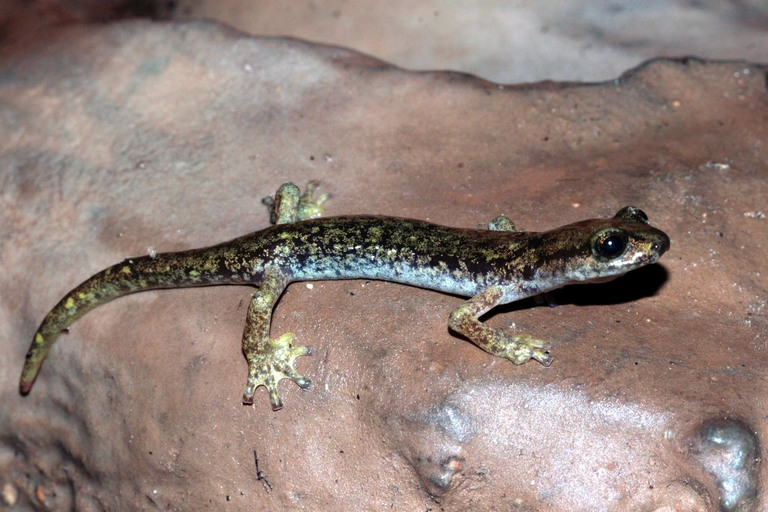
The Supramonte cave salamander (Speleomantes supramontis) of Italy.

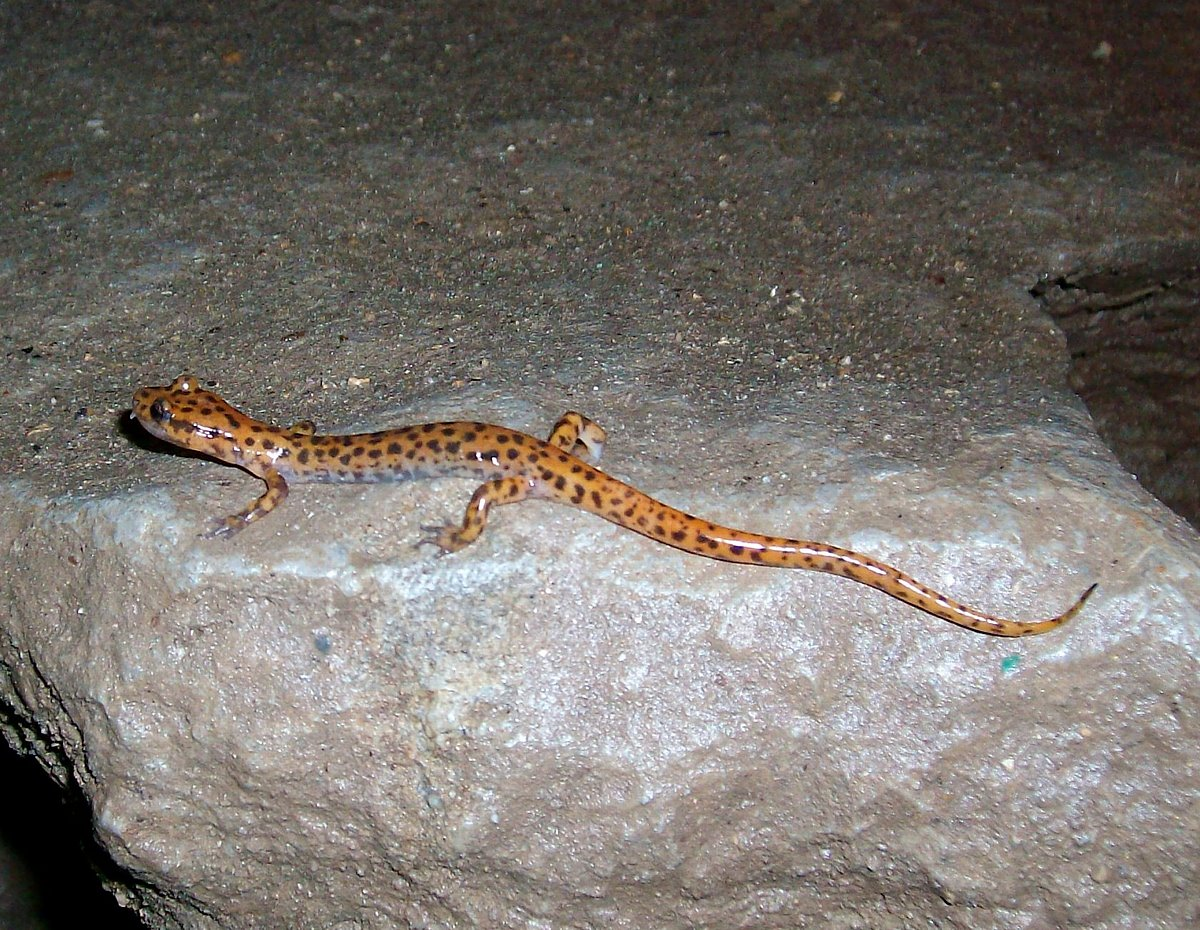
The spotted-tail cave salamander (Eurycea lucifuga) of the United States.

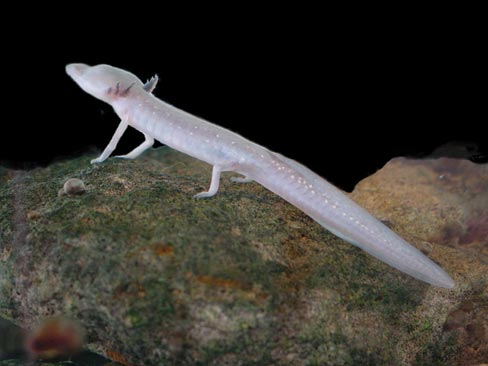
The Texas cave salamander (Eurycea rathbuni).

- The following species have commonly been termed "the cave salamander" without any additional modifier or adjective:
  - The olm (Proteus anguinus, or proteus), the first discovered example, a blind salamander endemic to caves of the Balkan peninsula
  - The spotted-tail cave salamander (Eurycea lucifuga), a lungless salamander endemic to caves of the eastern United States
- Eurycea (of North America) and Speleomantes (of Italy and France) are two genera of lungless salamanders with so many individual species termed "cave salamanders" that the entire group is sometimes so designated.
- Individual species of "cave salamander" (in some cases "blind salamander"), usually designated with an additional modifier or adjective in their common name, include the following lungless salamanders:
  - Eurycea lucifuga, often simply known as the cave salamander, alternately the spotted-tail salamander
  - Eurycea rathbuni, the Texas cave salamander, or Texas blind salamander (formerly, Typhlomolge rathbuni)
  - Eurycea tridentifera, the Honey Creek Cave blind salamander, or Comal blind salamander
  - Eurycea braggi, the southern grotto salamander (formerly Typhlotriton braggi)
  - Eurycea nerea, the northern grotto salamander (formerly Typhlotriton nereus)
  - Eurycea spelaea, the western grotto salamander or Ozark blind salamander (formerly, Typhlotriton speleus)
  - Speleomantes ambrosii, Ambrosi's cave salamander, or French cave salamander, or Spezia cave salamander
  - Speleomantes imperialis, imperial cave salamander, or scented cave salamander
  - Speleomantes supramontis, the Supramonte cave salamander
  - Speleomantes italicus, the Italian cave salamander
  - Speleomantes flavus, the Monte Albo cave salamander, or Stefani's salamander
  - Speleomantes strinatii, Strinati's cave salamander
  - Speleomantes sarrabusensis, Sarrabus' cave salamander
  - Gyrinophilus palleucus, the Tennessee cave salamander
    - G. p. necturoides, the Big Mouth Cave salamander
  - Gyrinophilus gulolineatus, the Berry Cave salamander
  - Gyrinophilus subterraneus, West Virginia spring salamander
  - Atylodes genei, the brown cave salamander, or Gene's cave salamander, Sardinian cave salamander, or simply Sardinian salamander
  - Chiropterotriton mosaueri, the cave splayfoot salamander
  - Haideotriton wallacei, the Georgia blind salamander (Haideotriton is considered synonymous with Eurycea by some experts.)
  - Plethodon dixi, the Dixie Caverns salamander
  - Karsenia koreana, the Korean crevice salamander

== See also ==
- List of troglobites
- Cavefish
