= Grotto salamander =

Grotto salamander may refer to three species of troglobitic salamander in the genus Eurycea, all endemic to the United States and all of which were formerly considered a single species (Eurycea spelaea):

- Southern grotto salamander (Eurycea braggi), endemic to central Arkansas
- Northern grotto salamander (Eurycea nerea), found in northern Arkansas and south-central Missouri
- Western grotto salamander (Eurycea spelaea), found in extreme southwestern Arkansas, extreme northwestern Kansas, southeastern Missouri, and northeastern Oklahoma
