= Batracobdella algira =

Scientific classification
- Domain: Eukaryota
- Kingdom: Animalia
- Phylum: Annelida
- Clade: Pleistoannelida
- Clade: Sedentaria
- Class: Clitellata
- Subclass: Hirudinea
- Order: Rhynchobdellida
- Family: Glossiphoniidae
- Genus: Batracobdella
- Species: B. algira

Binomial name
- Batracobdella algira (Moquin-Tandon, 1864)

Species of leech

Batracobdella algira is a species of leech in the family Glossiphoniidae which parasitizes amphibians such as frogs and salamanders. It favours warmer climes, and is found in southern and eastern Europe, North Africa, and southern England.

Batracobdella algira is a parasite of amphibians, and has been reported feeding on the salamanders Speleomantes supramontis and Hydromantes genei; the frogs Rana ridibunda, Rana temporaria, and Discoglossus pictus; and the toads Bufo mauritanicus and Bufo bufo.

== Bibliography ==
- Ben Ahmed, Raja; Ropelewska, Ewa; Bielecki, Aleksander; Cichocka, Joanna (2009). "Batracobdella algira Moquin-Tandon, 1846 (Hirudinida: Glossiphoniidae)--morphometric analysis and internal morphology". Wiadomości Parazytologiczne. 55 (4): 353–358. PMID 20209808.
- Seilern-Macpherson, Katharina; Lawson, Becki; Macadam, Craig R.; West, Pete; Reed, Neil; Gibson, Louise; Świątek, Piotr; Gajda, Łukasz; Cunningham, Andrew A.; Heaver, Joseph; Julian, Angela M. (2024-10-01). "Predation of anurans in southern England by Batracobdella algira, a leech previously unknown in the UK". The Herpetological Journal. 34 (4): 221–227. doi:10.33256/34.4.221227.
