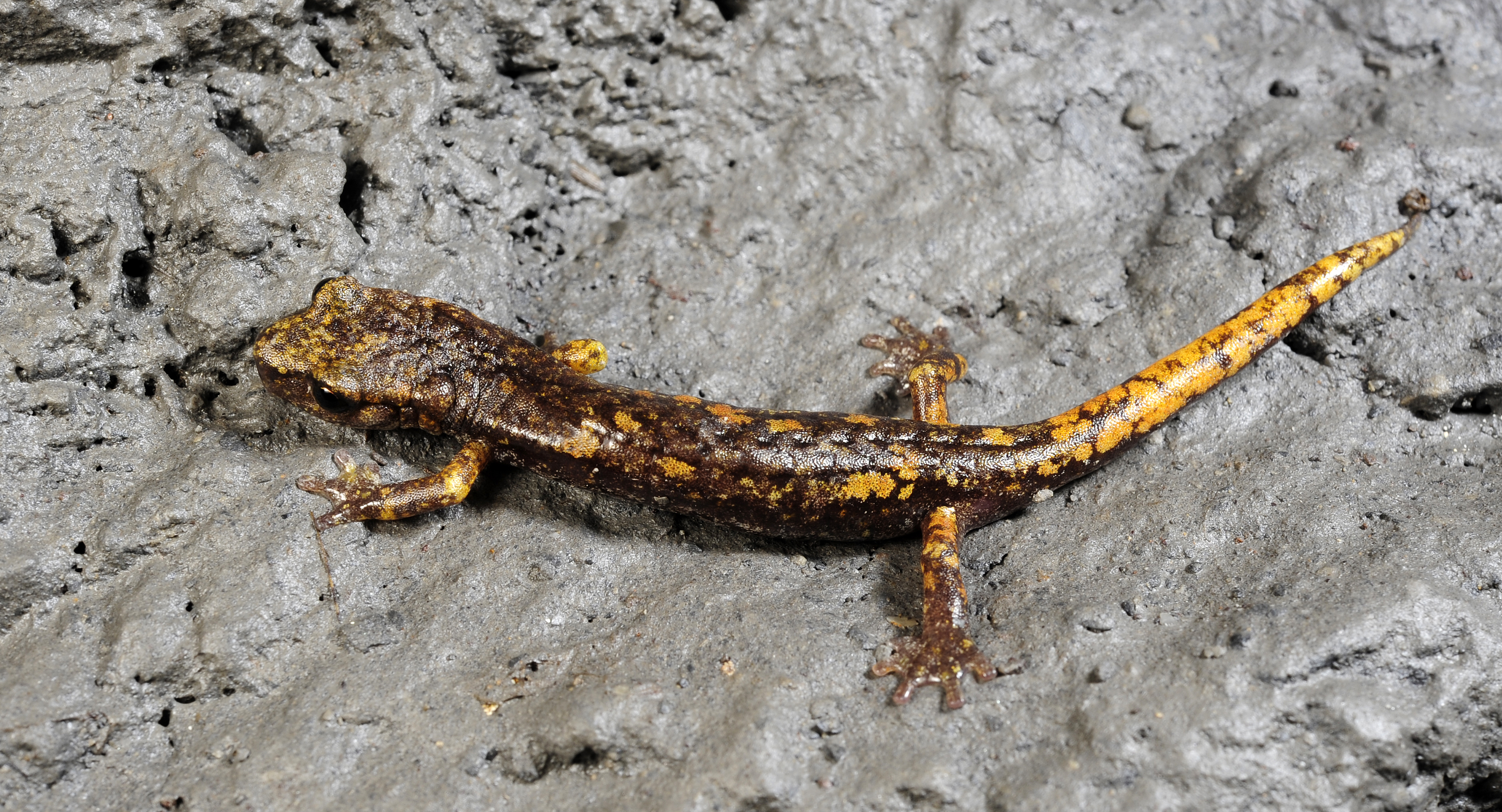

Conservation status
- Endangered (IUCN 3.1)

Scientific classification
- Kingdom: Animalia
- Phylum: Chordata
- Class: Amphibia
- Order: Urodela
- Family: Plethodontidae
- Genus: Speleomantes
- Species: S. strinatii

Binomial name
- Speleomantes strinatii (Aellen, 1958)
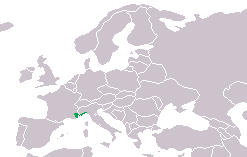

= Speleomantes strinatii =

Species of amphibian

Speleomantes strinatii, the French cave salamander, North-west Italian cave salamander, or Strinati's cave salamander is a small (10–12.5 cm (3.9–4.9 in) long) species of salamander found in northwest Italy and southeast France. It is very similar in appearance to the Italian cave salamander (Speleomantes italicus), but has a paler belly.

== Description ==
S. strinatii is a completely terrestrial plethodontid, meaning that they are a fully land-based species. S. strinatii is one of seven species of plethodontid salamanders found in southern Europe.

S. strinatii can vary widely in size. S. strinatii is highly sexually dimorphic. Male S. strinatii average about 96 millimetres (3.8 in) in length, and can grow to up to 116 mm (4.6 in) long. Females average about 100 millimetres (3.9 in) and have been observed at a maximum length of 123 mm (4.8 in). S. strinatii have an oval-shaped head, a rounded snout, and a slight overbite that is more pronounced in males. S. strinatii's hind limbs are slightly longer than their front limbs. The salamanders' hind feet have five digits each, and their front feet only have four digits. The S. strinatii also have highly variable coloration and patterns.

S. strinatii are commonly brown and black in color. However, some of these salamanders have different patterns on their skin, such as spots, blotches, or striped reticular patterns in red, yellow, gray, green, or metallic sheen.

== Habitat and distribution ==
S. strinatii are found in the Southeast region of France as well as in Northwest Italy. This species ranges from Alpes de Haute Provence to Northwest Tuscany, through the Maritime Alps, Ligurian Alps, and Ligurian Apennines. S. strinatii are commonly found at 0 to 2,290 metres (0 to 7,510 ft) above sea level. However, in the Maritime Alps, S. strinatii have been observed at a higher elevation of 2,432 metres (7,980 ft).

S. strinatii are not obligate cave dwellers. For example, during times of extreme heat, S. strinatii retreat to underground environments that are cooler and more comfortable.

S. strinatii can be active throughout the year. They prefer humid environments, such as the caves for which they are named. The salamander is found in caves, crevices, and other cavities from late spring to summer.

== Conservation ==
S. strinatii was most recently assessed for The IUCN Red List of Threatened Species in 2021. This list declared S. strinatii an endangered species, because the population size was declining. There are many known contributing factors. Known threats to S. strinatii include residential and commercial development, climate change and severe weather, biological resource use, and invasive species. There is a localized loss of habitat due to logging, tourist developments, and urbanization. Climate change is likely to be a major threat to S. strinatii due to the narrow climatic preferences of this species.

== Behavior ==
=== Territoriality ===
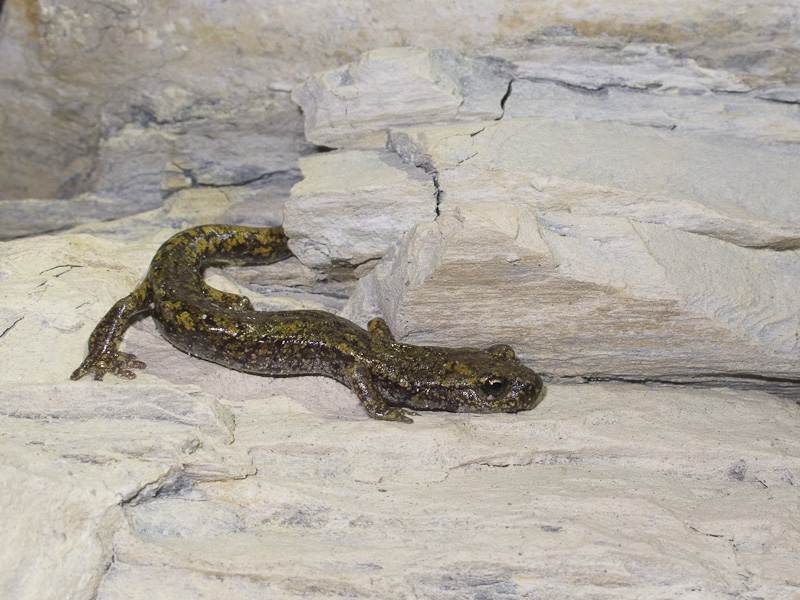
Image of Speleomantes strinatii on a rock

When in cave environments, S. strinatii movement is extremely limited and easily detected. S. strinatii have displayed spatial age-class segregation, with juveniles living closer to the cave entrances and older salamanders living deeper in the caves. It has been theorized that this segregation occurs because the juveniles are attempting to avoid cannibalistic behaviors that have been observed in older salamanders. Adult salamanders have been seen traveling 3 to 49 meters from their caves, while juveniles do not stray as far from their homes, only seen exploring between 1 and 12 metres (3 and 39 ft) from their cave habitats. S. strinatii can move about 10 metres (33 ft) per day when moving along the forest floor in favorable conditions.

There have been no observed sex-based differences in the homing capacities of S. strinatii.

=== Diet ===
S. strinatii appear to be opportunistic hunters with a wide range of invertebrate prey. These salamanders tend to eat more in autumn.

== Reproduction and life cycle ==
=== Fertilization ===
There is little to no research on the reproduction of S. strinatii in the wild. However, it is known that sperm transfer takes place through cloacal contact. S. strinatii have an observable mating season, with most pregnant females being found in the fall. Observations of S. strinatii in captivity see the salamanders hiding their eggs around loose rocks and leaf litter. Their eggs are ivory white and are about 5 to 6 millimeters in diameter. After 8 months, the eggs will double in size.

=== Lifespan ===
After hatching, the young are about 22 to 24 millimeters in length. Male S. strinatii reach sexual maturity at the age of three years, while females become sexually mature at 4 years of age. Direct observation of this species in captivity provides data that they may live about six years; however, the recapture of one individual provides evidence that their lifespan may be much longer, in this case, more than 17 years.

== Parental care ==
Post hatching parental care is known to occur in amphibians such as frogs and caecilians. However, there has not been much reported on such care in salamanders. There is little to no information regarding S. strinatii nest sites and egg clutches in the wild; however, in captivity, females have been observed to produce between six and fourteen relatively large eggs.

=== Egg Guarding ===
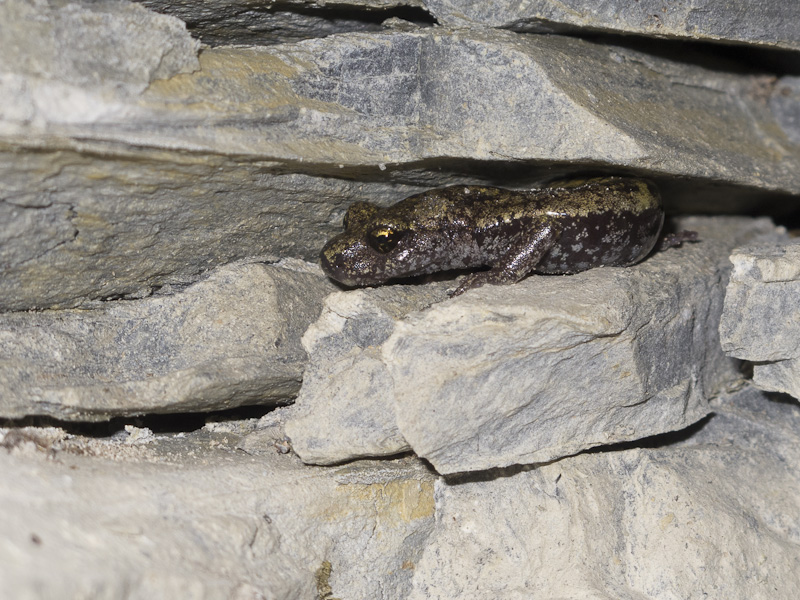
Image of Speleomantes strinatii in the cracks of a cave

Females were observed guarding their eggs for up to ten months. During brooding, the females were seen to coil around their eggs, defending them against approaching conspecifics. Occasionally, attending females would eat their own eggs. This cannibalistic behavior is theorized to be a way of disposing of eggs that are not developing.

In a study conducted by Oneto et al. in 2007, female S. strinatii were observed using video footage for twenty-four hours a day. In this study, the researchers had one brooding female and one non-brooding female living in a terrarium that scientists created in an attempt to imitate their natural habitat. In this study, females were observed to lay eggs in small depressions on the ground. During the first week after laying their eggs, the female was in constant contact with her eggs, often seen rotating the eggs with her hind limbs. Ten days after laying her eggs, the mother began leaving her nesting site for short periods of time spanning from 3 to 46 minutes. After five days, the non-brooding female began intruding into the nesting site. After 10 days, the brooding female was seen repelling the other female from her nesting site. The brooding female was also seen aggressively defending her eggs from rats. During the brooding period, the female remained in contact with her eggs for 98% of the time. By the time the eggs began hatching, only two of the nine eggs that the female laid remained. The first egg hatched 45 weeks after being laid. The second egg hatched five days later. Due to the five-day gap between hatching, the offspring had different-sized bodies. The first hatchling was larger than the second hatchling. For the first week after hatching, the female remained motionless inside the nesting site for about 97% of the time, but this decreased by 20% by the sixth week. The hatchlings were observed to be in skin-to-skin contact with their mother often, and the mother was seen transporting her hatchlings on her back multiple times. During the sixth week, the hatchlings began leaving the nesting site alone for the first time. Forty-two days after hatching, the three animals were seen to leave the terrarium permanently.

== Microbial Threats ==
Like other Hydromantes, S. strinatii produces a deterring secretion from dorsal skin glands as a form of protection. The bright-colored patterns on their backs can be considered aposematic. This secretion may be protective against different microbial infections. Batrachochytrium salamandrivorans and Batrachochytrium dendrobatidis are two similar single-celled fungal pathogens that have had detrimental effects on amphibian populations worldwide, including S. strinatii. Batrachochytrium dendrobatidis has been known to cause disease in frogs, salamanders, and caecilians, while Batrachochytrium salamandrivorans has only been reported to infect Urodelans (newts and salamanders). Batrachochytrium salamandrivorans and Batrachochytrium dendrobatidis both cause the infectious disease of chytridiomycosis. Symptoms of this fatal condition include disruptions of the amphibian's salt-water balance, destruction of the amphibian's skin, and eventual heart failure. The fungal pathogens are believed to have originated in Asia and are thought to likely have been introduced to Europe through the pet trade of salamanders. Batrachochytrium salamandrivorans has been detected in the wild in the Netherlands, Belgium, Germany, and Spain and have been shown to be highly pathogenic to most urodelan taxa. While there are currently no records of Batrachochytrium salamandrivorans in France or Italy, it is probable that it will spread through these areas in the near future, as the closest recorded outbreak is only 509 kilometres (316 mi) away. There are some current hypotheses that S. strinatii's skin secretions may act as protection against this fungus. The secretions have been shown to kill the fungus within 24 hours. Because of this microbial protection, researchers do not believe that Bd will have the same detrimental effect on S. strinatii populations as it had for other salamanders and amphibians.
