= Wintu Shasta salamander =

Conservation status
- Vulnerable (IUCN 3.1)

Scientific classification
- Kingdom: Animalia
- Phylum: Chordata
- Class: Amphibia
- Order: Urodela
- Family: Plethodontidae
- Genus: Hydromantes
- Species: H. wintu

Binomial name
- Hydromantes wintu Bingham, Papenfuss, Lindstrand, and Wake, 2018

Species of salamander

The Wintu Shasta salamander (Hydromantes wintu) is a species of salamander in the family Plethodontidae. It is endemic to Shasta County in California.

== Taxonomy ==
It was previously thought to be a population of the Shasta salamander (H. shastae) and is not physically distinguishable, but a 2018 phylogenetic study found it to be a genetically distinct species. It is named in honor of the Winnemem Wintu people who originally inhabited the area until being displaced by early European settlers, and had many of their cultural sites inundated by Shasta Lake.

== Distribution ==
It is found in a very small area on the McCloud River arm on the north shore of Shasta Lake, near the vicinity of the former Shasta Iron Mine.

== Habitat ==
Its distribution was likely fragmented by the creation of the lake and the construction of the Shasta Dam. Proposals to raise the water levels of the lake would likely flood more habitats and further threaten it. However, in 2021 the U.S. Fish and Wildlife Service found the species to not warrant Endangered Species Act protections.
