= Shasta salamander =

Conservation status
- Near Threatened (IUCN 3.1)

Scientific classification
- Kingdom: Animalia
- Phylum: Chordata
- Class: Amphibia
- Order: Urodela
- Family: Plethodontidae
- Genus: Hydromantes
- Species: H. shastae

Binomial name
- Hydromantes shastae Gorman & Camp, 1953

Species of amphibian

The Shasta salamander (Hydromantes shastae) is a species of salamander in the family Plethodontidae. It is endemic to Shasta County in California.

== Taxonomy ==
Formerly considered to be a single species with a rather small distribution in the vicinity of Shasta Lake, a 2018 study found it to comprise three species, including H. shastae sensu stricto, and two new species: the Samwel Shasta salamander (H. samweli), found in the north-central and northwest sides of the lake, and the Wintu Shasta salamander (H. wintu) on the northern shore of the lake near the McCloud River. Both species are physically similar to H. shastae and can only be distinguished by range and genetics. The reclassification of the Shasta salamander complex into three distinct species highlights its ecological significance, as each species occupies different, highly specific habitats. Conservation efforts are crucial, given the species' vulnerability due to habitat fragmentation and potential threats such as commercial limestone extraction.

== Distribution and habitat ==
It is found in the Cascade Range in areas around Shasta Lake with limestone substrate, primarily between Squaw Creek and the Pit River, but also on the south side of Shasta Lake and in the vicinity of Ingot. Recent studies have expanded its known range to non-limestone habitats, including coniferous forests and mixed woodlands with metasedimentary or metavolcanic rock outcrops. Its natural habitats are temperate forests, freshwater springs, rocky areas, and caves. The Shasta salamander's habitat provides essential moisture and protection from temperature extremes. It thrives in areas with limestone fissures and caves, which also contribute to its reproductive success, as females lay eggs in damp cavern environments.

== Threats ==
Its small distribution was likely fragmented by the creation of the lake and the construction of the Shasta Dam. Proposals to raise the water levels of the lake would likely flood more habitats and further threaten it. In addition, the splitting of this species into three distinct species with highly restricted ranges likely makes it even more endangered than previously thought. Factors such as climate change, habitat degradation, and pollution further exacerbate these threats, potentially leading to a decline in population numbers. Conservation organizations advocate for monitoring and protecting these habitats to ensure the survival of all three species. However, in 2021 the U.S. Fish and Wildlife Service found the species to not warrant Endangered Species Act protections.
