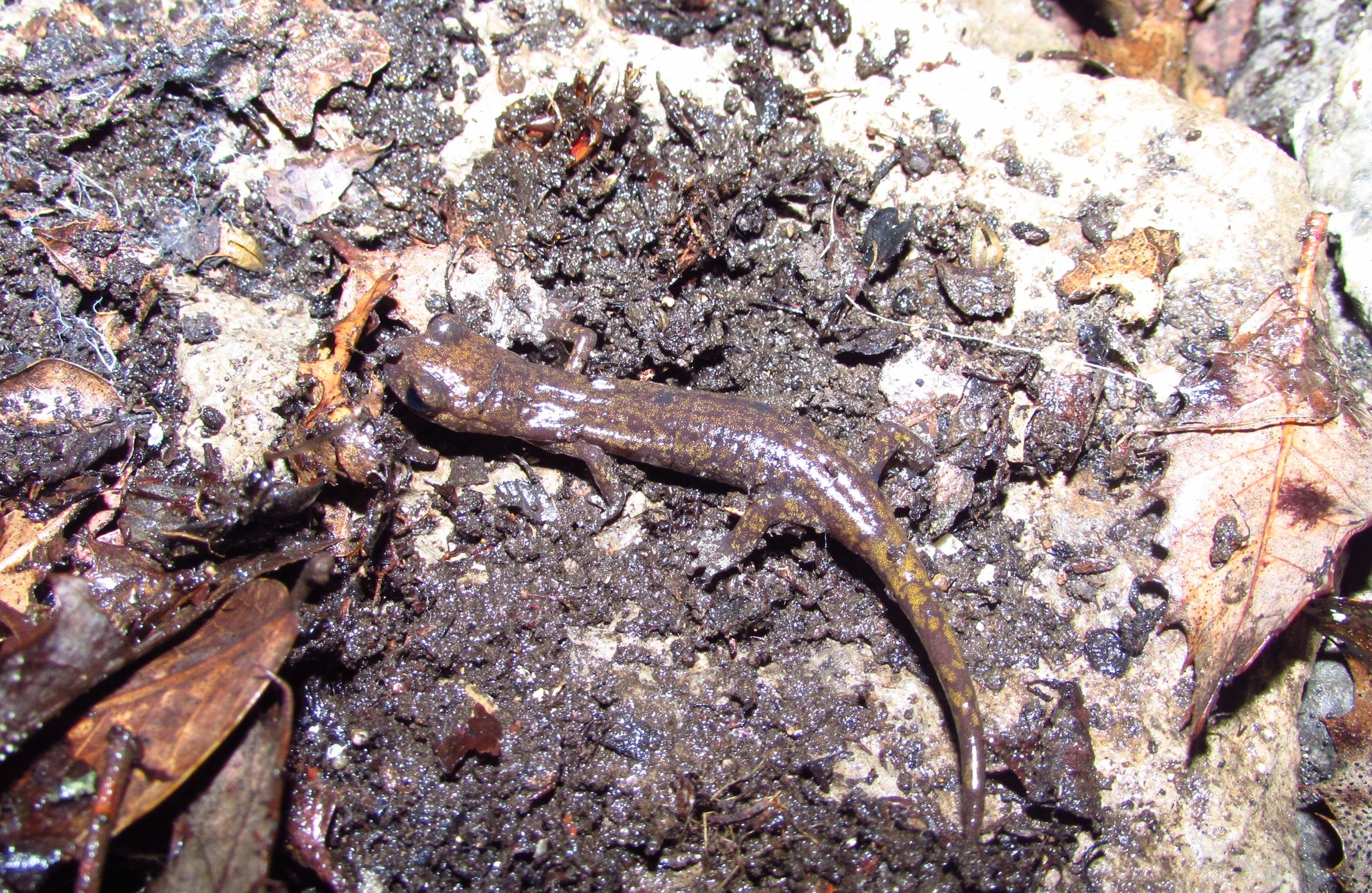

Conservation status
- Near Threatened (IUCN 3.1)

Scientific classification
- Kingdom: Animalia
- Phylum: Chordata
- Class: Amphibia
- Order: Urodela
- Family: Plethodontidae
- Genus: Hydromantes
- Species: H. samweli

Binomial name
- Hydromantes samweli Bingham, Papenfuss, Lindstrand, and Wake, 2018

= Samwel Shasta salamander =

Species of salamander

The Samwel Shasta salamander (Hydromantes samweli) is a species of salamander in the family Plethodontidae. It is endemic to Shasta County in California.

== Taxonomy ==
It was previously thought to be a population of the Shasta salamander (H. shastae) and is not physically distinguishable, but a 2018 phylogenetic study found it to be a genetically distinct species. It is named after its type locality, Samwel Cave, which originates from Sa-Wal, the Wintu name for grizzly bear.

== Distribution ==
It is found in a fairly small area around the north-central and northwest sides of Shasta Lake, but possibly extending 20 km further to the west.

== Threats ==
Its distribution was likely fragmented by the creation of the lake and the construction of the Shasta Dam. Proposals to raise the water levels would likely flood more habitats and further threaten it. However, in 2021 the U.S. Fish and Wildlife Service found the species to not warrant Endangered Species Act protections.
