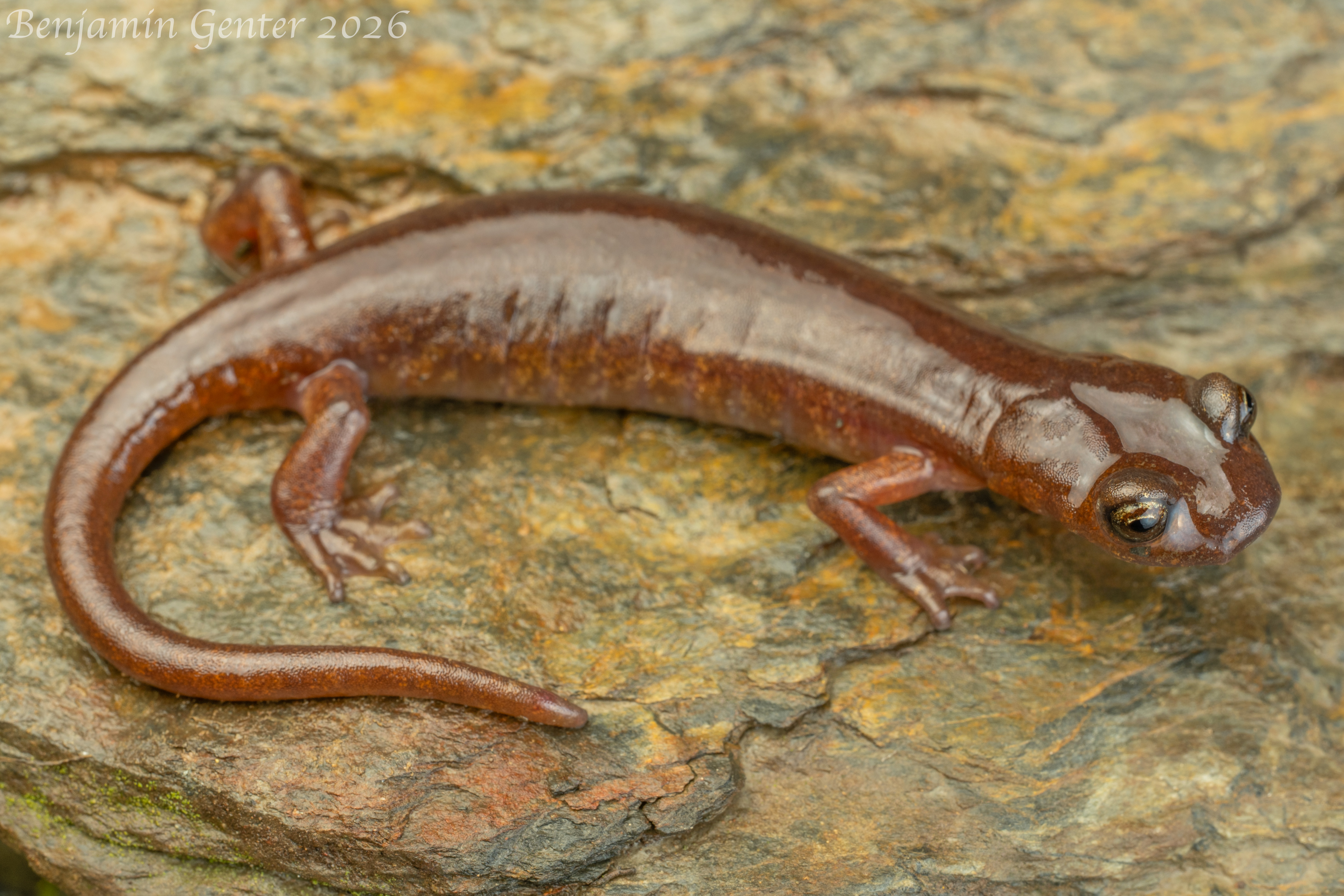

Conservation status
- Near Threatened (IUCN 3.1)

Scientific classification
- Kingdom: Animalia
- Phylum: Chordata
- Class: Amphibia
- Order: Urodela
- Family: Plethodontidae
- Genus: Hydromantes
- Species: H. brunus

Binomial name
- Hydromantes brunus Gorman, 1954
- Hydromantes brunus range map (2025), from the California Department of Fish and Wildlife

= Limestone salamander =

Species of amphibian

The limestone salamander (Hydromantes brunus) is a member of the lungless salamander family. Discovered in 1952, this species belongs to a genus endemic to California. It is endemic to a portion of the Merced River Canyon in Mariposa County, California.

== Description ==
The limestone salamander has a flattened body, head, webbed toes, and a short tail. It is typically 5.0-7.5 cm in length. Adults are brownish with a pale ventral surface; the male has oval-shaped mental gland. The species was originally thought to be life-birthing, but is now known to lay eggs. Young hatch in the egg and emerge fully formed, with no larval stage. They are yellowish greenish, darkening with age. Like all lungless salamanders, it respires through its skin.

== Distribution and habitat ==
The genus Hydromantes is endemic to California. The limestone salamander occurs only in the Lower Merced River drainage, in several disparate localities, at elevations of 300–760 m in inhabits canyon slopes that are greater than 35 degrees. Habitats include moss-covered limestones outcroppings, chaparral, under rocks and logs in moist environments. During dry weather it stays underground in caves and rock crevices.

== Conservation ==
The limestone salamander is classified as near threatened by the IUCN, mostly because it is known from fewer than five locations (where the species appears to be uncommon but not rare). Under the Department of the Interior, US Fish and Wildlife, its Federal listing status is currently under review. The species is listed as Threatened by the California Department of Fish and Wildlife under the State Endangered Species Act. A proposed gold operation mine in Hell Hollow is thought to be the most immediate threat, in addition to general habitat loss due to construction of highways, quarries and dams. A portion of the Merced River Canyon is protected by the State of California and managed by the State Department of Fish and Wildlife as the Limestone Salamander Ecological Reserve (~120 acres); a further 1,600 acres have been designated as the Limestone Salamander Area of Critical Environmental Concern.
