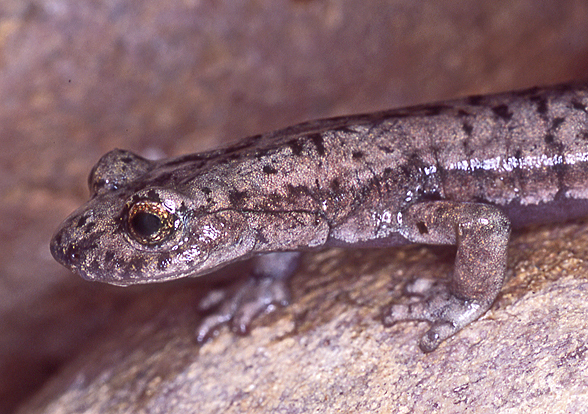

Conservation status
- Least Concern (IUCN 3.1)

Scientific classification
- Kingdom: Animalia
- Phylum: Chordata
- Class: Amphibia
- Order: Urodela
- Family: Plethodontidae
- Genus: Hydromantes
- Species: H. platycephalus

Binomial name
- Hydromantes platycephalus (Camp, 1916)
- IUCN Red List range map for Hydromantes platycephalus, Version 2022-2

Synonyms
- Spelerpes platycephalus Camp, 1916

= Mount Lyell salamander =

Species of amphibian

The Mount Lyell salamander (Hydromantes platycephalus) is a species of web-toed salamander in the family Plethodontidae. This species was first observed in 1915 on Mount Lyell in Yosemite National Park, during the Yosemite Natural History Survey conducted by the California Museum of Vertebrate Zoology. It is endemic to the Sierra Nevada mountains of California in the United States. It is usually found at high elevation, in microhabitats such as rock fissures, talus, caves and crevices. Its altitudinal range is 1,220–3,670 m (4,000–12,040 ft) above sea level. No significant threats to this species are known.

== Description ==
The Mount Lyell salamander has a flat, slender body that is a deep brown-black in color, with dorsal grey-green mottling. In juveniles, the mottling is usually more gold-green in color, but there is wide variation among individuals. Populations tend to have mottling that matches the color of the granite in the region.

The species' head is noticeably flattened, as its Latin eponym (platycephalus, meaning "flat head") suggests. Its toes are webbed, as is typical of the Hydromantes genus, and it has short legs and a stubby tail. Adults grow to approximately 120 millimetres (4.7 in) in length. The species typically has 12-13 costal grooves.

Populations on the eastern slopes of the Sierra differ slightly in coloration from those on the western slopes. Individuals on the western slopes tend to have "speckled" mottling, while individuals on the eastern slopes have mottling that is more continuous and blocky, with some individuals even appearing to have a completely solid-colored back. At one time, individuals on the eastern slopes were considered to potentially be a separate species (The Owens Valley web-toed salamander), but this is no longer the case.

== Distribution ==
Contrary to its name, the Mount Lyell salamander is not endemic to a specific mountain, though its range is limited to California. It can be found from roughly Alpine County to Tulare County, CA at elevations between 1,200 metres (3,900 ft) and 3,600 metres (11,800 ft). However, because it resides in difficult terrain at high elevations, the species' range is not very well mapped, and new populations are still being discovered. For example, the Blackwood Canyon population in Lake Tahoe Basin, which filled a major gap in the species' distribution and was the first record of the species in Placer County, was only discovered in 2006. A large proportion of the species' observations come from the Yosemite National Park area, due to the park's accessibility and high volume of observers.

== Habitat ==
The species is typically found in rocky areas with minimal topsoil at high elevation. Individuals can occupy a variety of microhabitats, including rock exposures, talus, rock fissures, caves, crevices, and under rocks. Like other plethodontid salamanders, the Mount Lyell salamander is lungless and conducts respiration through its skin. Consequently, it requires exposure to moisture, and therefore is often found in the presence of water sources such as melting snow, spring run-off, or waterfalls. At lower elevations, the species is more closely tied with riparian corridors. Vegetation such as moss, forbs, lichen, ferns, wildflowers, heather, willow, and scrubby pines can be present in the species' habitat, though large shrubs and trees are generally uncommon.

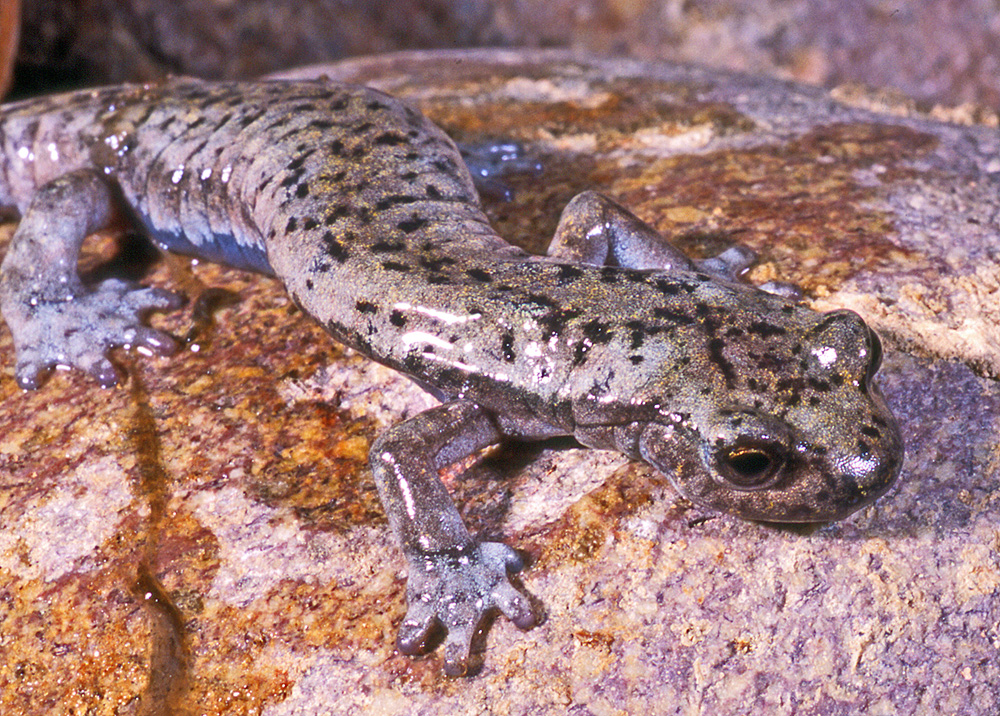
Mount Lyell Salamander (Hydromantes platycephalus). Credit: U.S. Geological Survey/photo by Chris Brown

== Life History ==
=== Lifespan ===
Nothing is known about the species lifespan or maturity. If similar to other plethodontids, then the species likely takes around 2–3 years to mature and lives for up to 20 years.

=== Reproduction ===
While its reproductive habits are not well documented, it is believed that Mount Lyell salamander females lay 6-14 eggs in deep rock crevices during the fall, which they guard until hatching in spring or early summer. Museum specimens of females collected in the summer contained 6-14 eggs, and apparent hatchlings have been found in the summer. Oviposition has never been observed in this species.

=== Activity ===
The species is largely nocturnal, and most active on the surface during or after rainfall. It's active period is believed to be from May through late August, depending on temperature and snowfall. It seeks out deep rock fissures and other moist crevices during the winter and dry periods.

=== Home Range ===
Individuals appear to have very small home ranges, perhaps even less than 100 metres (330 ft). A pair of biologists who located a single individual near Nevada Falls in Yosemite National Park in 2006 (at the time the species had not been reported there), returned to the same location ten years later in 2016 and again found an individual within 10 metres (33 ft) of the original observation.

=== Diet ===
The species' most common prey items are small invertebrates such as centipedes, spiders, termites, beetles, and adult or larval flies.

=== Predation ===
It is believed that predators of the Mount Lyell salamanders include birds, snakes, and mammals that typically feed on similar species. However, because of their secrecy and habitation of remote, high elevation sites, it is unlikely that they are an important prey source for most species.

=== Competition ===
The species appears to be a high elevation talus specialist that avoids both predation and interspecies competition by residing in habitats that are too harsh for most other species to survive in. Few other salamander species occupy the preferred habitat of this species, and those that do typically only overlap with low-elevation populations.

== Behavior ==
=== Locomotion ===
The salamander relies on its webbed toes and stocky tail when scaling down slopes. Its toes likely provide suction and grip when traversing the rocky terrain it resides in. The species also uses its short, muscular tail as a "walking stick" to brace itself each time it lifts a rear foot. This aids the salamander in ascending steep inclines, and provides additional balance.

=== Feeding ===
The salamander possesses a large, ballistic tongue, which it launches to eat small invertebrates. It can extend its tongue a distance of up to 80% of its body length in less than 20 msc. Because the elastic muscle mechanism that enables its tongue projection is resistant to changes in temperature (unlike most other forms of muscular contraction), its tongue projection will not slow down at low temperatures. This is likely an adaptation to both its ectothermic metabolism, and for feeding in its chilly, high elevation habitat.

=== Anti-Predation Behaviors ===
When threatened, the species will raise its head and tail and lean its body downwards, likely as an intimidation tactic to appear larger. It may also maintain a coiled position when picked up, so that if dropped, it may effectively and quickly roll away. This technique is likely particularly useful given the species' naturally steep habitat.

== Status ==
The Mount Lyell salamander is currently considered a species of Least Concern by the IUCN. This is due to the species' remote habitat, which largely protects it from land development, and the fact that large portions of its population occur in protected areas such as Yosemite National Park. However, because almost nothing is known about the species, it is unclear if environmental shifts resulting from climate change will impact its populations. Many high elevation species are at risk of range reduction or habitat loss as rising temperatures reduce snowpack in the Sierras and alter the hydrology and vegetation of alpine landscapes. Chytrid fungus may also pose a potential threat, though it has not yet been detected in the species.
