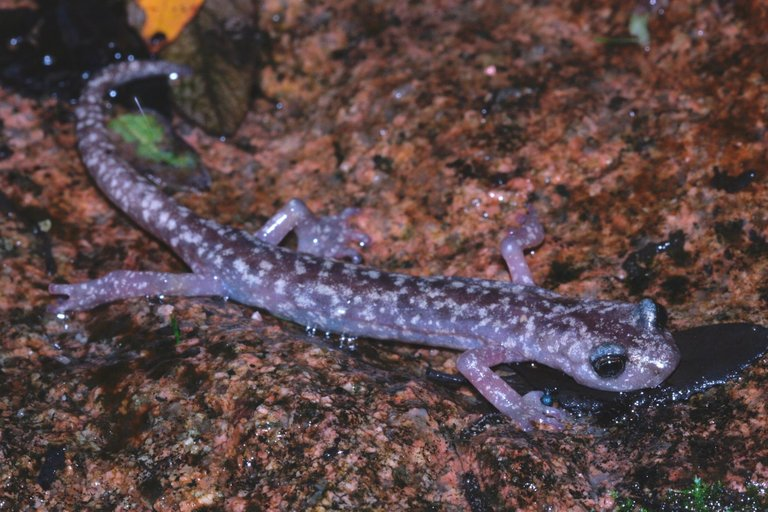

Conservation status
- Critically Endangered (IUCN 3.1)

Scientific classification
- Kingdom: Animalia
- Phylum: Chordata
- Class: Amphibia
- Order: Urodela
- Family: Plethodontidae
- Genus: Speleomantes
- Species: S. sarrabusensis

Binomial name
- Speleomantes sarrabusensis Lanza, Leo, Forti, Cimmaruta, Caputo & Nascetti, 2001

= Sarrabus' cave salamander =

Species of reptile

The Sarrabus' cave salamander or Sette Fratelli cave salamander (Speleomantes sarrabusensis) is a species of salamander in the family Plethodontidae. It is found in southeastern Sardinia, east of Cagliari, in the Sarrabus region. The species was thought to have been a part of Speleomantes imperialis but was found to be a separate species.
