= West Virginia spring salamander =

Conservation status
- Critically Endangered (IUCN 3.1)

- Critically Imperiled (NatureServe)

Scientific classification
- Kingdom: Animalia
- Phylum: Chordata
- Class: Amphibia
- Order: Urodela
- Family: Plethodontidae
- Genus: Gyrinophilus
- Species: G. subterraneus

Binomial name
- Gyrinophilus subterraneus Besharse & Holsinger, 1977

Species of amphibian

The West Virginia spring salamander (Gyrinophilus subterraneus) is a species of troglobitic salamander in the family Plethodontidae. It is endemic to West Virginia, the United States.

The salamander is only found in the General Davis Cave in Greenbrier County and lives in cave stream passages with large amounts of decaying organic matter. It is considered critically endangered by the International Union for Conservation of Nature (IUCN) and is under review for listing under the Endangered Species Act of 1973.

General Davis Cave forms part of the 4.4-square-mile (11 km^{2}) Davis Hollow drainage basin, itself part of the Greenbrier River watershed. A conservation easement for this cave has been purchased by The Nature Conservancy and it is closed to the public in order to protect this salamander and a small bat colony.

Like the western grotto salamander (Eurycea spelaea), the West Virginia spring salamander can undergo complete metamorphosis, which is very rare among cave salamanders. It is not known how often metamorphosis occurs, but when it does, it happens after the larvae have reached a very large size.

The IUCN estimates that fewer than 250 individuals of this species remain as of 2021. Possible future threats to the West Virginia spring salamander include development of the groundwater recharge area, interaction with spring salamanders (Gyrinophilus porphyriticus) and the potential for introduction of salamander chytrid fungus (Batrachochytrium salamandrivorans) from Europe to the Americas.
