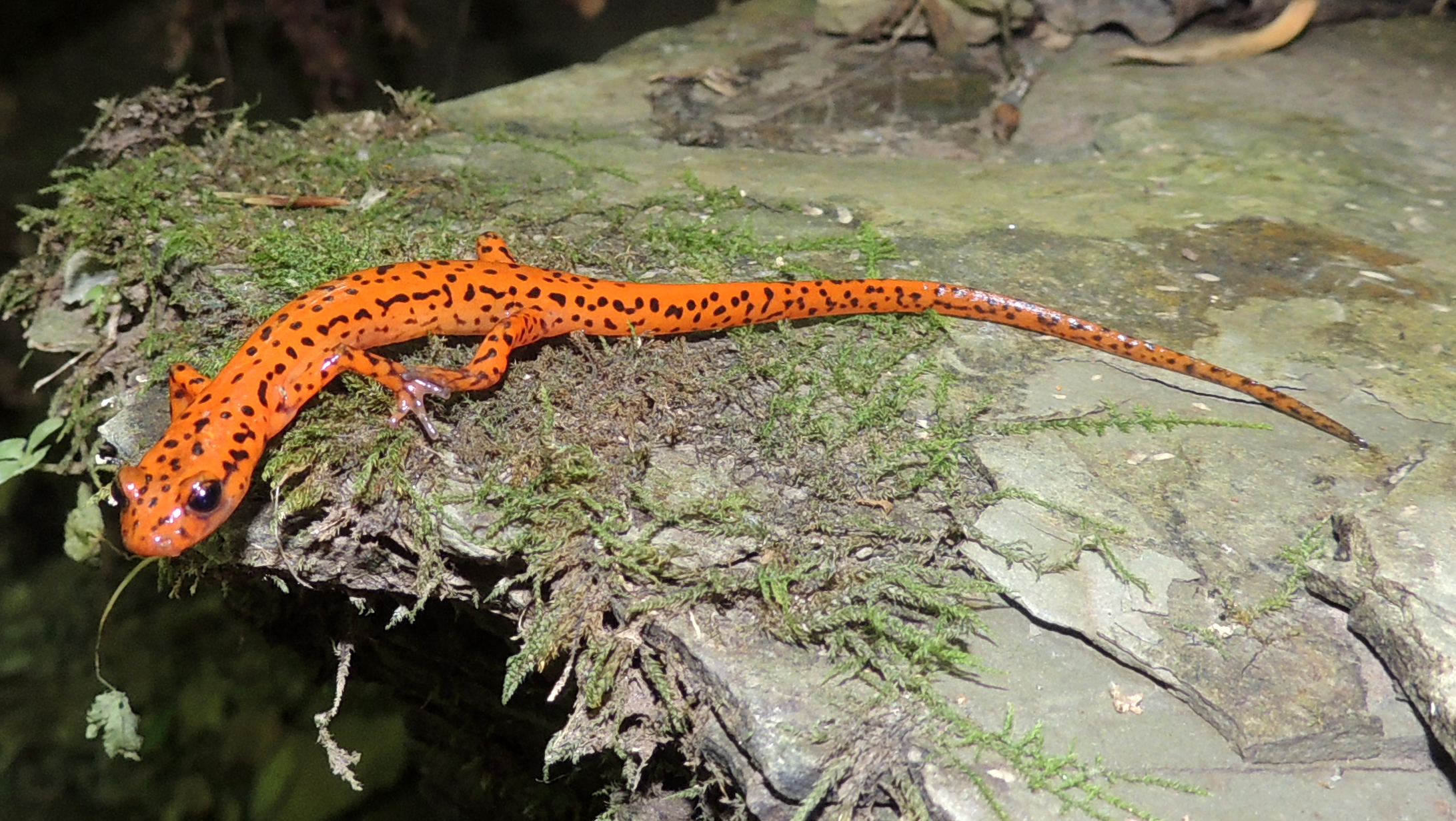
- Adult Eurycea lucifuga

Conservation status
- Least Concern (IUCN 3.1)

- Secure (NatureServe)

Scientific classification
- Kingdom: Animalia
- Phylum: Chordata
- Class: Amphibia
- Order: Urodela
- Family: Plethodontidae
- Genus: Eurycea
- Species: E. lucifuga

Binomial name
- Eurycea lucifuga Rafinesque, 1822

= Cave salamander (spotted-tail) =

Species of amphibian

The cave salamander or spotted-tail salamander (Eurycea lucifuga) is a species of brook salamander in the family Plethodontidae. It is well known for living in and around caves in the southeast United States. Adult cave salamanders are bright orange with black spots. This species is, somewhat vaguely, referred to by the common name of 'cave salamander'; however, it is not restricted to caves, but is known for inhabiting surface-level, terrestrial, woodland habitats, as well.

== Description ==
The cave salamander is a relatively large lungless salamander, ranging in total length from 10 to 20 cm (4 to 8 in). The tail makes up a significant proportion of the total length, up to 60–65%. Post-metamorphic individuals have orange to reddish orange backs and a pale, unmarked ventral surface. The dorsal surface of the body is heavily marked with irregularly spaced spots and dashes. The limbs of the cave salamander are long. There are 14–15 costal grooves on the side of the body. This species has a prehensile tail.

An analysis of gut content has shown a variety of prey animals in its diet and included annelid worms, snails, crustaceans, millipedes, various arachnids, and insects.

== Naming confusion ==
The name 'cave salamander' can be confusing because the term is also used more generally to describe cave-dwelling salamanders. Despite its name, the cave salamander is much less cave adapted than other cave-dwelling salamanders like the olm or Texas blind salamander. Unlike the more cave-adapted species, the cave salamander is brightly pigmented, has eyes, and does not exhibit neoteny.

== Habitat and distribution ==
Cave salamanders are typically found in areas with exposed limestone or other calcareous rock, particularly in crevices of rock faces, bluffs and caves. This species is also frequently found hundreds of metres from the mouths of caves, far beyond the twilight zone of the cave. Despite its name, the cave salamander is not restricted to caves, and may be found in forests near bluffs and rocky crevices and around springs, and also under moist rocks and logs. This species is found in Alabama, Arkansas Illinois, Missouri, Kentucky, Virginia, West Virginia, Oklahoma, Tennessee, Kansas, Indiana, and Ohio.

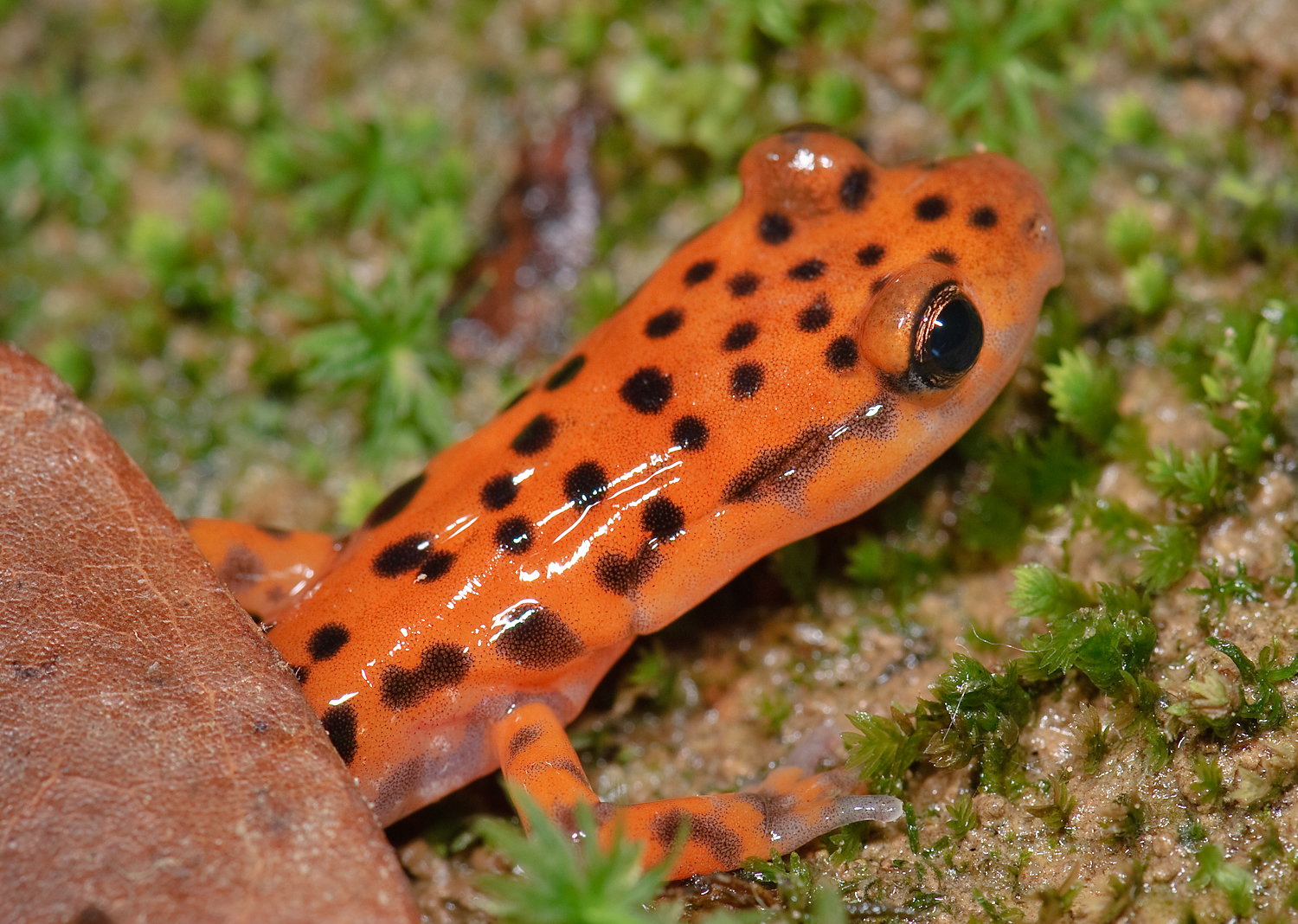
In Arkansas

== Courtship and reproduction ==
The courtship and mating season is not well documented in this species, although available data suggests it occurs in the summer, continuing to early autumn. Observations made from a pair maintained in captivity are summarized as follows: The courtship of this species is described as similar to that of the Northern two-lined salamander; where the male nudges and rubs his chin on the females' head and snout. The male may engage in 'push-ups' using his hind legs, and begin to position the base of his tail under the females. If receptive, she will straddle his tail as they walk in unison, while the male arches his back. A spermatophore, approximately 4 mm high is deposited on the ground in the females path, which she picks up with her cloaca. After mating, there seems to be a prolonged period in which the females deposit eggs, taking place from September to February. Few biologists have found eggs of the cave salamander, suggesting that females seek difficult to access places, such as springs, streams and rim stone pools deep within caves and crevices. In Missouri, eggs have been found laid singly or attached to the sides of rimstone pools, on silt deposits or on the bottom of small pools. Recently laid eggs are white, with two jelly membranes surrounding the embryo. Egg diameter ranges from 2.5 to 3.2 mm. Females can produce between 5–120 eggs.

=== Larval ecology ===
Larval cave salamanders appear similar to other larval Eurycea. Larvae have been found in both surface streams, and in cave streams and pools. It is thought that larvae found in surface streams may have been washed out of caves and crevices by heavy rains. Cave salamander larvae are predators, and feed primarily on benthic invertebrates, such as snails, ostracods, copepods, isopods, mayflies, stoneflies, beetles and flies, of which ostracods, snails and fly larvae are the most common dietary item. Prey is captured by slowly crawling over the substrate and grasping the invertebrate by the mouth and swallowing it whole, thus prey is limited by the gape of the salamanders mouth. From hatching to metamorphosis to a terrestrial adult takes between 6 and 18 months, although this period is variable by region. Larvae may attain sizes of 70 mm or 2.8 in (33 mm (1.3 in) snout-to-vent-length) by the time of metamorphosis.
