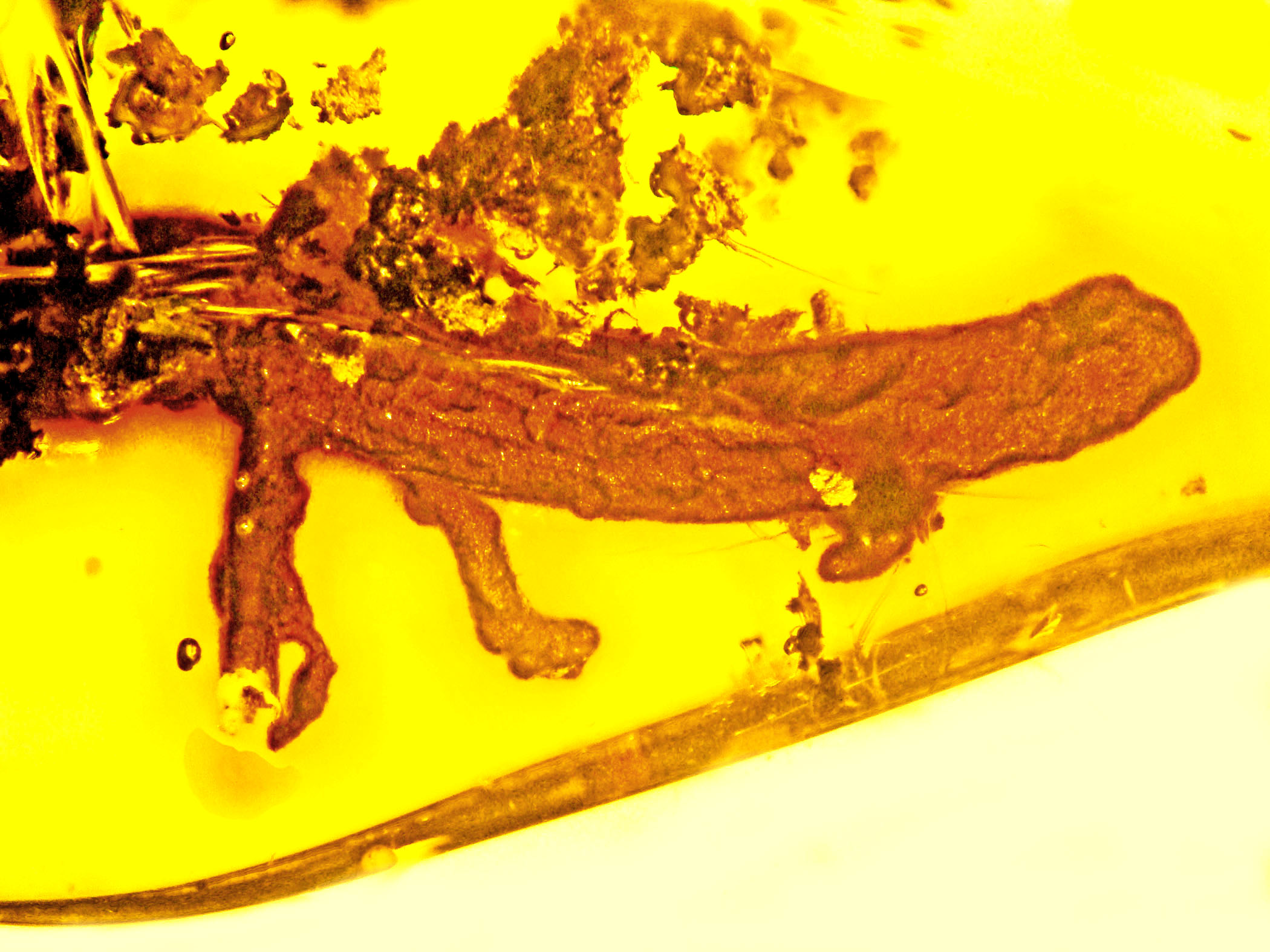
- P. hispaniolae holotype

Scientific classification
- Kingdom: Animalia
- Phylum: Chordata
- Class: Amphibia
- Order: Urodela
- Family: Plethodontidae
- Subfamily: Hemidactyliinae
- Genus: †Palaeoplethodon; Poinar and Wake, 2015
- Species: †P. hispaniolae

Binomial name
- †Palaeoplethodon hispaniolae Poinar and Wake, 2015

= Palaeoplethodon =

Palaeoplethodon Temporal range: Miocene, 20–15 Ma

Extinct genus of salamanders

Palaeoplethodon hispaniolae is an extinct salamander species found in Miocene Dominican amber from the Dominican Republic. It is so far the only salamander species known to have existed in the Caribbean.

== Discovery and description ==
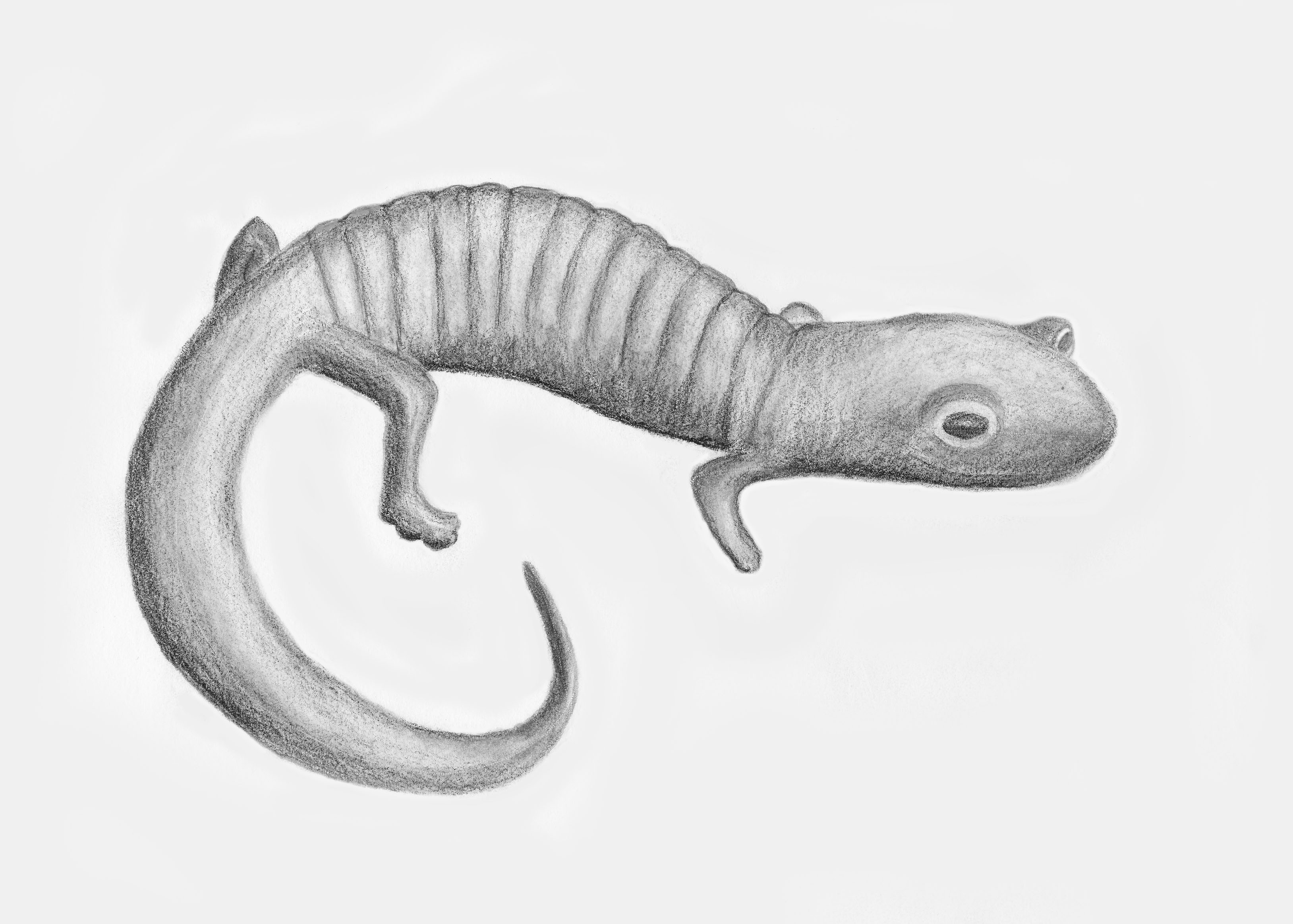
Restoration

The only known specimen was a juvenile found in an amber mine in the mountain range between Puerto Plata and Santiago. The amber itself was from the extinct legume species Hymenaea protera. The salamander is missing its left front leg, implying possible predation. Its legs did not have any distinct toes, rather, it had complete webbing with small bumps on it. It most likely lived in small trees or in tropical flowers.

It is unknown how this salamander's lineage arrived to the area, and how it became extinct. They may have arrived by a land bridge, or they may have ridden debris to the island. It is possible that their extinction was caused by climate change or by extensive predation.

It is most likely a stem-group to the plethodontid tribe Bolitoglossini.
