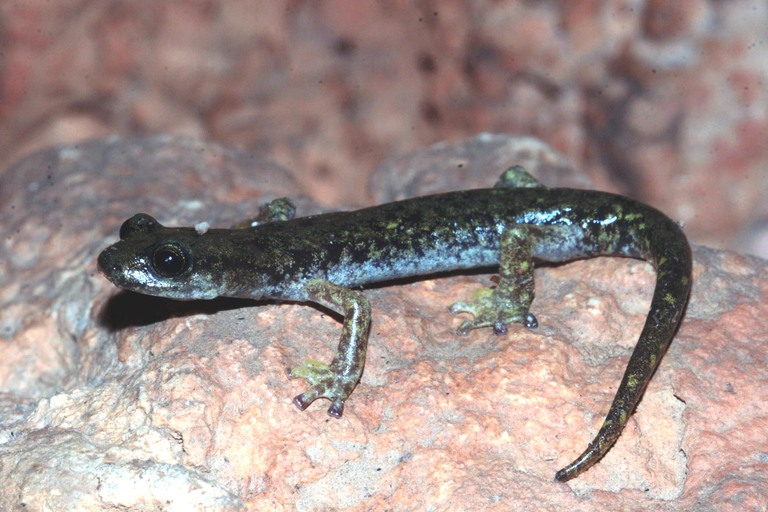
- Supramonte cave salamander, Speleomantes supramontis

Scientific classification
- Kingdom: Animalia
- Phylum: Chordata
- Class: Amphibia
- Order: Urodela
- Family: Plethodontidae
- Subfamily: Plethodontinae
- Genus: Speleomantes; Dubois, 1984

= Speleomantes =

European cave salamanders Temporal range: Miocene–Recent

Genus of salamanders

Speleomantes, or European cave salamanders, are a genus of salamander in the family Plethodontidae, or lungless salamanders. It is one of two genera in the family to inhabit the Old World (the other being Karsenia), with the remaining 250 or so species being found in North, Central and South America. The genus is endemic to Italy and a few nearby areas (San Marino, Monaco, and eastern Provence).

== Characteristics ==
Until recently, Speleomantes was combined with the web-toed salamander genus Hydromantes from the Sierra Nevada range of California, which are their closest relatives, and are still combined by some herpetologists. They lack lungs; respiration takes place through the skin, which must be kept moist, and the lining of the mouth. The head is broad and distinct with prominent eyes. There are characteristic deep nasolabial grooves between the nostrils and the edge of the lips. The tongue has a broad tip and is extensible, being shot forward to catch prey. The tail is short, less than half the length of the body, and limbs are robust. The toes often have blunt tips and are partially webbed.

== Behaviour ==
European cave salamanders are found not only in caverns but on the ground among leaf litter, usually near streams, in wooded valleys. In the open air these salamanders are nocturnal, emerging in wet weather to forage but retreating in dry weather into caves and crevices or hiding beneath stones or logs. When underground they are active at any time of day. They are agile and can climb on rock outcrops or vertical cave walls, using their tails as props. The skin secretes toxic substances, which may deter predators, as may their habit of rolling their tail upwards.

Males are a little smaller than females. They mate on land after an elaborate courtship routine. The female lays up to a dozen eggs in a damp crevice and guards them until they hatch in six months to a year; during this time she does not normally eat, though it has been known for females to eat some of their eggs. The young emerge as miniature adults about 2 cm (0.8 in) without an intervening tadpole phase.

== Species ==
The genus contains the following species:

Image	Scientific name	Common name	Distribution
	Speleomantes ambrosii	Ambrosi's cave salamander	south-eastern France and north-western Italy
	Speleomantes flavus	Monte Albo cave salamander	Sardinia, Italy.
	Speleomantes genei	Gene's cave salamander	south-western Sardinia, Italy.
	Speleomantes imperialis	Imperial cave salamander	Sardinia, Italy.
	Speleomantes italicus	Italian cave salamander	Italy
	Speleomantes sarrabusensis	Sarrabus' cave salamander	south-eastern Sardinia, Italy.
	Speleomantes strinatii	Strinati's cave salamander	north-western Italy and south-eastern France
	Speleomantes supramontis	Supramonte cave salamander	Sardinia, Italy.

== Evolutionary history ==
The oldest record of Speleomantes is a single vertebra from the Middle Miocene of Slovakia.
