= Batracobdella =

Scientific classification
- Kingdom: Animalia
- Phylum: Annelida
- Clade: Pleistoannelida
- Clade: Sedentaria
- Class: Clitellata
- Subclass: Hirudinea
- Order: Rhynchobdellida
- Family: Glossiphoniidae
- Genus: Batracobdella; Viguier, 1897

Genus of annelid worms

Batracobdella is a genus of Glossiphoniidae.

The genus was described in 1897 by Viguier.

Species:

- Batracobdella algira (Moquin-Tandon, 1846)
- Batracobdella paludosa (Carena, 1824)
