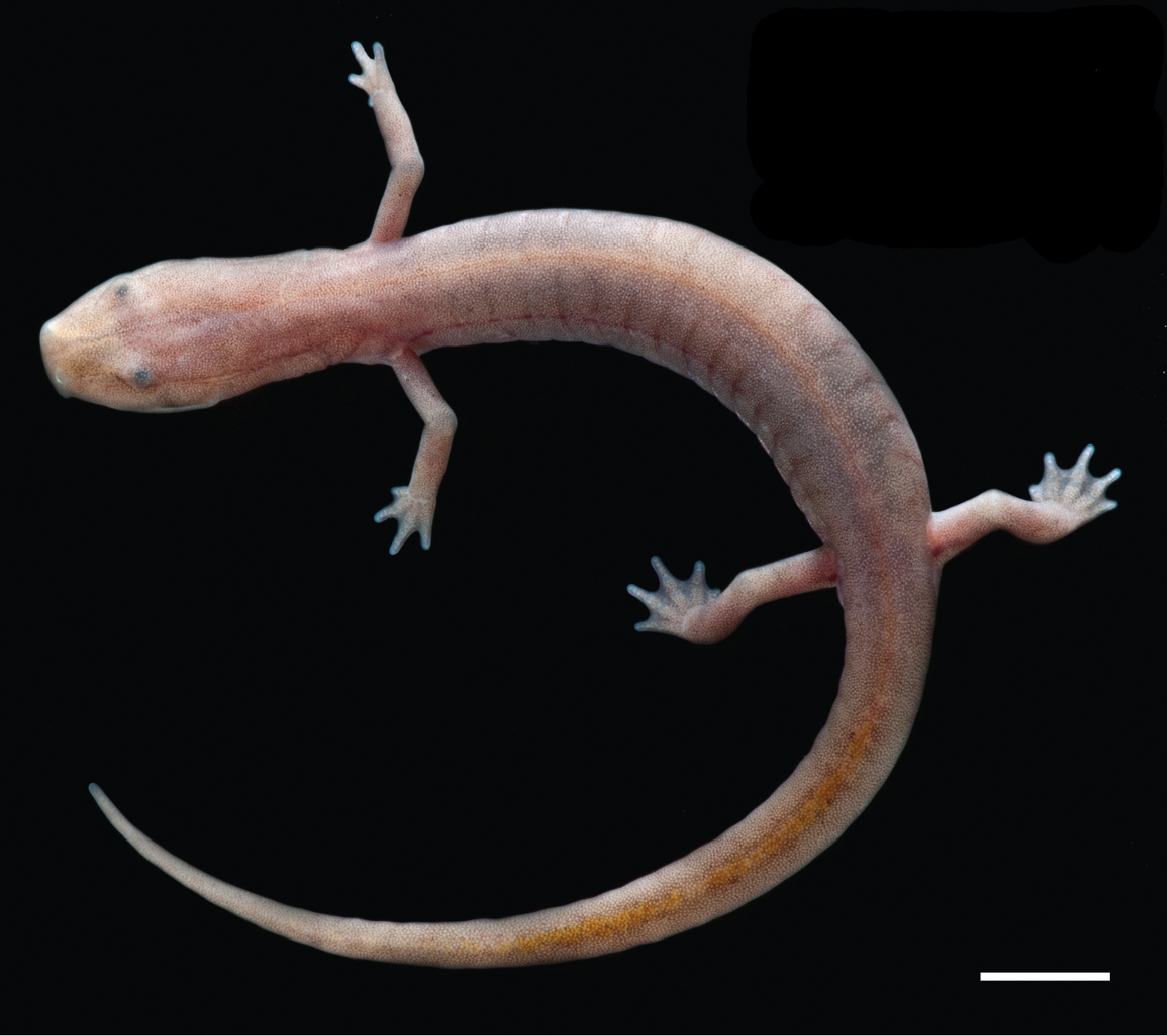

Conservation status
- Least Concern (IUCN 3.1)

- Apparently Secure (NatureServe)

Scientific classification
- Kingdom: Animalia
- Phylum: Chordata
- Class: Amphibia
- Order: Urodela
- Family: Plethodontidae
- Genus: Eurycea
- Species: E. spelaea

Binomial name
- Eurycea spelaea (Stejneger, 1892)

Synonyms
- Typhlotriton spelaeus Stejneger, 1892; Eurycea spelaeus Stejneger, 1892

= Western grotto salamander =

Species of amphibian

The western grotto salamander (Eurycea spelaea), also called the Ozark blind salamander and previously known as just the grotto salamander, is a species of salamander in the family Plethodontidae. It is endemic to the United States. Its natural habitats are freshwater springs, inland karsts, and caves. It is not currently threatened, but is sensitive to changes in groundwater quality, flooding, and reduction in bat population.

== Taxonomy ==
The grotto salamander was discovered in 1891 on the Ozark Plateau, and described by Leonhard Hess Stejneger in 1892. It is now considered a member of the genus Eurycea, but was originally described as Typhlotriton spelaeus.

Previously, it was thought to have occurred throughout the Ozark Plateau, but during the mid-20th century, two other species were described from populations formerly assigned to E. spelaea: the northern grotto salamander (E. nerea) of the Salem Plateau and adjacent West Springfield Plateau, and the southern grotto salamander (E. braggi) of the East Springfield Plateau. These species were later lumped in with E. spelaea. However, a 2017 study found all three to be phylogenetically distinct from one another and have deep divergence times dating back to the Late Miocene; E. spelaea is thought to be the sister species to the clade comprising E. nerea and E. braggi. All three grotto salamanders are thought to descend from an ancestral surface-dwelling form.

== Distribution and habitat ==
This species inhabits the karst regions beneath the West Springfield Plateau of the Ozark Mountains of extreme northwestern Arkansas, extreme southeastern Kansas, southwestern Missouri, and northeastern Oklahoma.

Their eggs are often attached to rocks in or near water. As larvae, the western grotto salamander lives in springs and streams near cave entrances. As adults, They migrate deep into the caves themselves and live out their lives underground. They prefer waters between 5.5 and 16.5 °C, and feed on small, cave-dwelling invertebrates such as Gammarus, though they are also known to eat guano as well.

== Description ==
The larvae of this salamander are bold in coloration: brownish or purplish gray, sometimes with yellow flecks on the sides. Adults can grow up to 13.5 cm and larvae tend to be between 10 and 30mm. They have a distinctive high tail fin and external gills. Larvae that live in an environment with light, like outside the caves in brooks or streams, have fully functional eyes, even if their vision seems to fade in older individuals. If they grow up in darkness, it will result in closed lids or degenerate retinas. After two or three years, the larvae metamorphose, at which point they lose their gills, their eyelids gradually fuse shut over the following year and is eventually covered with supraocular skin, and the now blind adult form spends the rest of its life in a cave. Because the larval eyes continue to grow till metamorphosis occurs, adults will have larger eyes the later the metamorphosis starts, and vice versa. The species is one of very exceptions from the rule that cave salamanders are paedomorphic. It has been hypothesized that the larval form is most beneficial in caves because the majority of the prey lives in water, and their aquatic feeding mechanism is more efficient in the larval form than that of post-metamorphic individuals. The Western grotto salamander has been described as an opportunistic and omnivorous feeder, which in addition to eating small aquatic animals is also coprophagic, feeding on bat guano, which is just as rich in nutrients as their living prey. This allows them to exploit the available food sources in both the aquatic and terrestrial environments inside the cave. Alongside E. nerea, E. braggi, and the West Virginia spring salamander, the western grotto salamander is the only cave salamander which undergoes metamorphosis. The adult form is pinkish white, sometimes with traces of orange on its tail, feet, and sides, and has 16–19 costal grooves.

== See also ==
- Cave salamander
