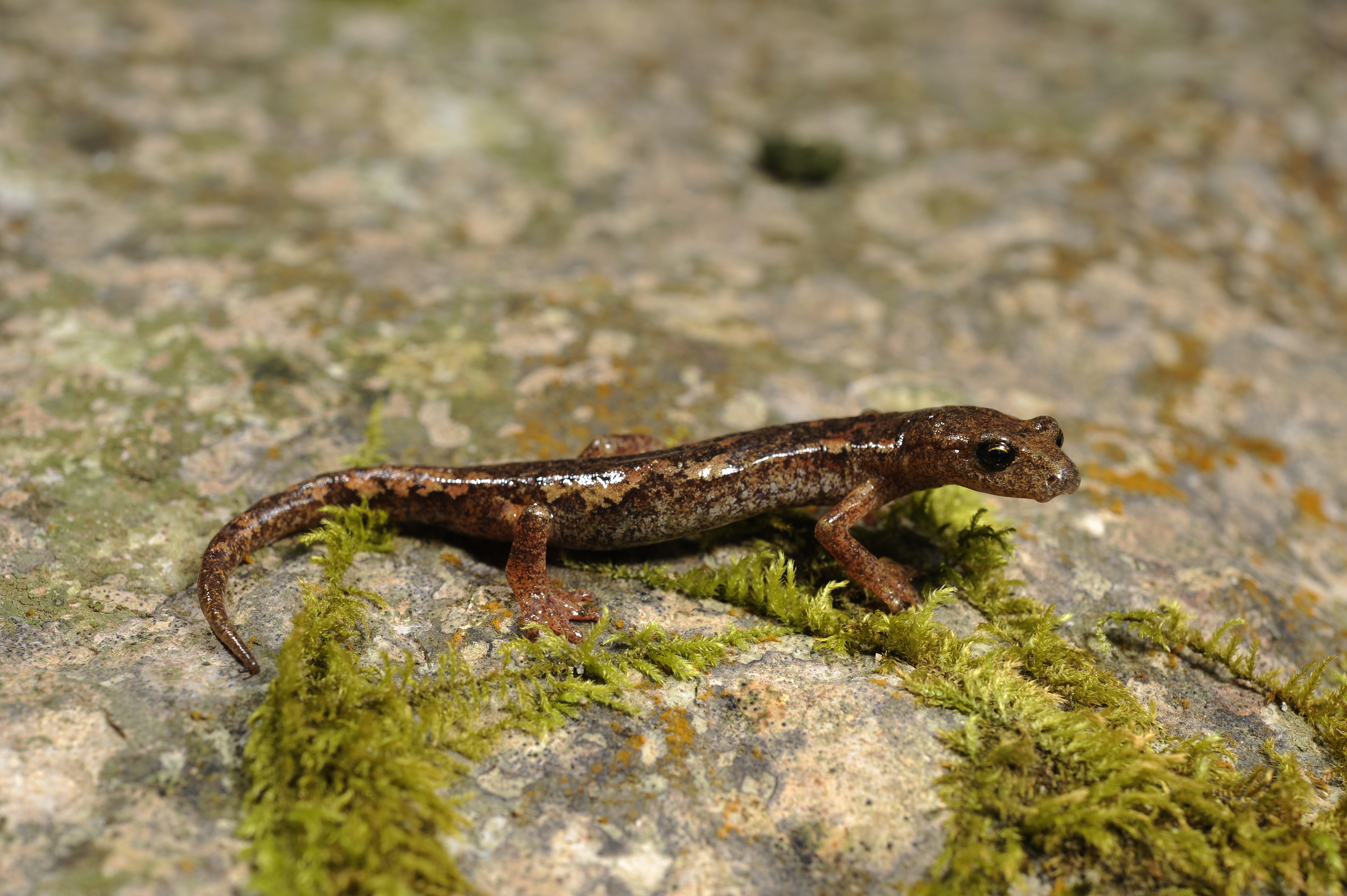

Conservation status
- Critically Endangered (IUCN 3.1)

Scientific classification
- Kingdom: Animalia
- Phylum: Chordata
- Class: Amphibia
- Order: Urodela
- Family: Plethodontidae
- Genus: Speleomantes
- Species: S. ambrosii

Binomial name
- Speleomantes ambrosii (Lanza, 1954)

Synonyms
- Hydromantes ambrosii Lanza, 1954

= Ambrosi's cave salamander =

Species of amphibian

Ambrosi's cave salamander or the Spezia cave salamander (Speleomantes ambrosii) is a species of salamander in the family Plethodontidae. Endemic to northwestern Italy, its natural habitats are temperate forests, rocky areas, caves, and subterranean habitats (other than caves). It is threatened by habitat loss.

== Description ==
Ambrosi's cave salamander has short, stout limbs, pointed toes and a short tail and grows to around 12.5 cm (5 in) including the tail. There is a ridge known as a canthus between the snout and the eye. The colour is variable, being brown to black with marbling, mottling or streaking in grey, green, yellow, red, pink or brown. Some individuals are a uniform brown or black colour. The underparts are also dark with paler markings.

== Distribution and habitat ==
Ambrosi's cave salamander is endemic to a small area of northwestern Italy, occurring at scattered locations in La Spezia province. Despite its name, it is not restricted to caves though it retreats under stones, logs and into caverns in dry periods. At other times it is active on the leaf litter near streams and on wet rocky outcrops in wooded valleys at altitudes of up to 1,250 metres (4,100 ft). In the southeast of its distribution, where its range overlaps that of the Italian cave salamander (Speleomantes italicus), the two species sometimes hybridise.

== Behaviour ==
Ambrosi's cave salamander is found in moist environments where it is active by night on the ground, sometimes scrambling around in low vegetation. Males become sexually mature at four years and females at five. After an elaborate courtship routine, a clutch of a few eggs about 6 mm (0.2 in) long is laid in a concealed location where they are guarded by the female until they hatch directly into juvenile salamanders. Longevity is estimated to be seventeen years.

== Status ==
The International Union for Conservation of Nature has assessed the Ambrosi's cave salamander as being critically endangered. This is on the basis that it has a very restricted range, its total extent of occurrence being less than 5,000 square kilometres (1,900 sq mi), and suitable habitat may be declining locally. However it occurs in two protected areas, the Parco Nazionale delle Cinque Terre and the Parco naturale regionale delle Alpi Apuane.
