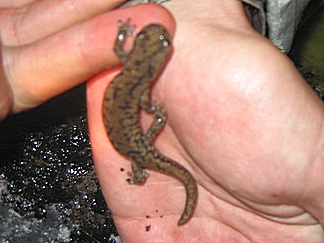
- Hydromantes platycephalus

Scientific classification
- Kingdom: Animalia
- Phylum: Chordata
- Class: Amphibia
- Order: Urodela
- Family: Plethodontidae
- Subfamily: Plethodontinae
- Genus: Hydromantes; Gistel, 1848

Species
- 5, See table.

= Hydromantes =

Web-toed salamanders

Genus of salamanders

Hydromantes, commonly referred to as web-toed salamanders, is a genus of the lungless salamander family, Plethodontidae; they achieve respiration through their skin and the tissues lining their mouth. They are endemic to mountains of California in the United States. Salamanders of this genus are distinguished in having extremely long tongues that they can project to 80% of their body length. Similar species endemic to southern France and Italy are now classified in a distinct genus, Speleomantes.

== Species ==
The following five species are placed in this genus:

| Binomial Name and Author | Common name |
|---|---|
| Hydromantes brunus Gorman, 1954 | Limestone salamander |
| Hydromantes platycephalus (Camp, 1916) | Mount Lyell salamander |
| Hydromantes samweli Bingham, Papenfuss, Lindstrand, and Wake, 2018 | Samwel Shasta salamander |
| Hydromantes shastae Gorman & Camp, 1953 | Shasta salamander |
| Hydromantes wintu Bingham, Papenfuss, Lindstrand, and Wake, 2018 | Wintu Shasta salamander |
