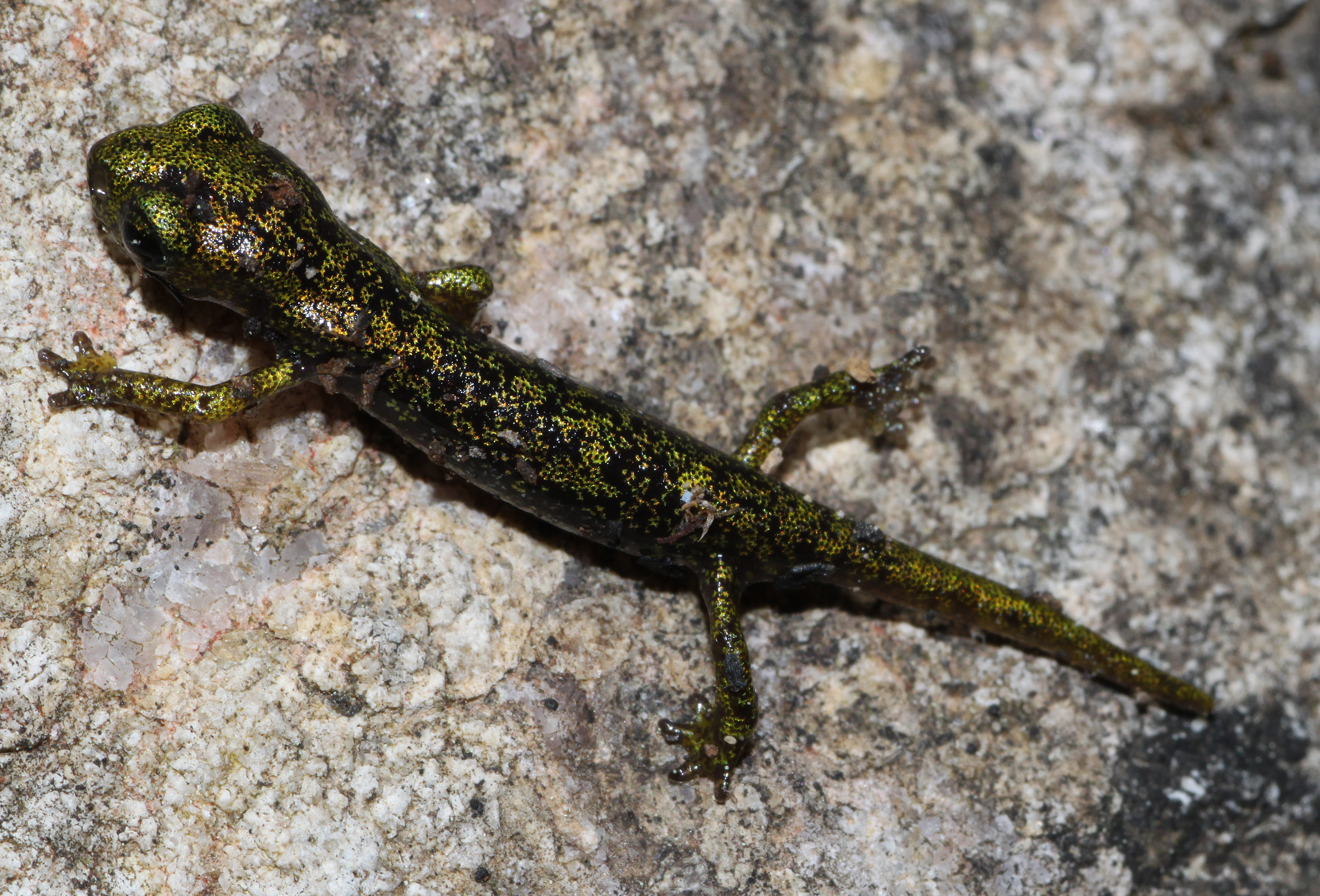

Conservation status
- Near Threatened (IUCN 3.1)

Scientific classification
- Kingdom: Animalia
- Phylum: Chordata
- Class: Amphibia
- Order: Urodela
- Family: Plethodontidae
- Genus: Speleomantes
- Species: S. imperialis

Binomial name
- Speleomantes imperialis (Stefani, 1969)
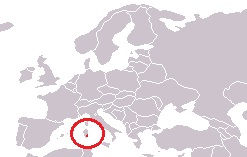
- Dark green: areas of habitation

Synonyms
- Hydromantes genei imperialis Stefani, 1969; Hydromantes genei funereus Stefani, 1969; Hydromantes imperialis — Lanza and Vanni, 1981

= Imperial cave salamander =

Species of amphibian

The imperial cave salamander, imperial salamander, odorous cave salamander, or scented cave salamander (Speleomantes imperialis) is a species of salamander in the family Plethodontidae. It is endemic to Sardinia.

== Habitat and conservation ==
Speleomantes imperialis inhabits humid rocky outcrops, caves, crevices, and forested areas near streams at elevations of 7–1,170 m (23–3,839 ft) above sea level. It lays a few terrestrial eggs that have direct development (i.e., there is no free-living larval stage). While common within its limited range and not facing major threats, it can suffer localized habitat loss and illegal collection. It occurs in the National Park of the Gulf of Orosei and Gennargentu and the Monte Sette Fratelli Regional Park, probably also the Giara di Gesturi Regional Park.
