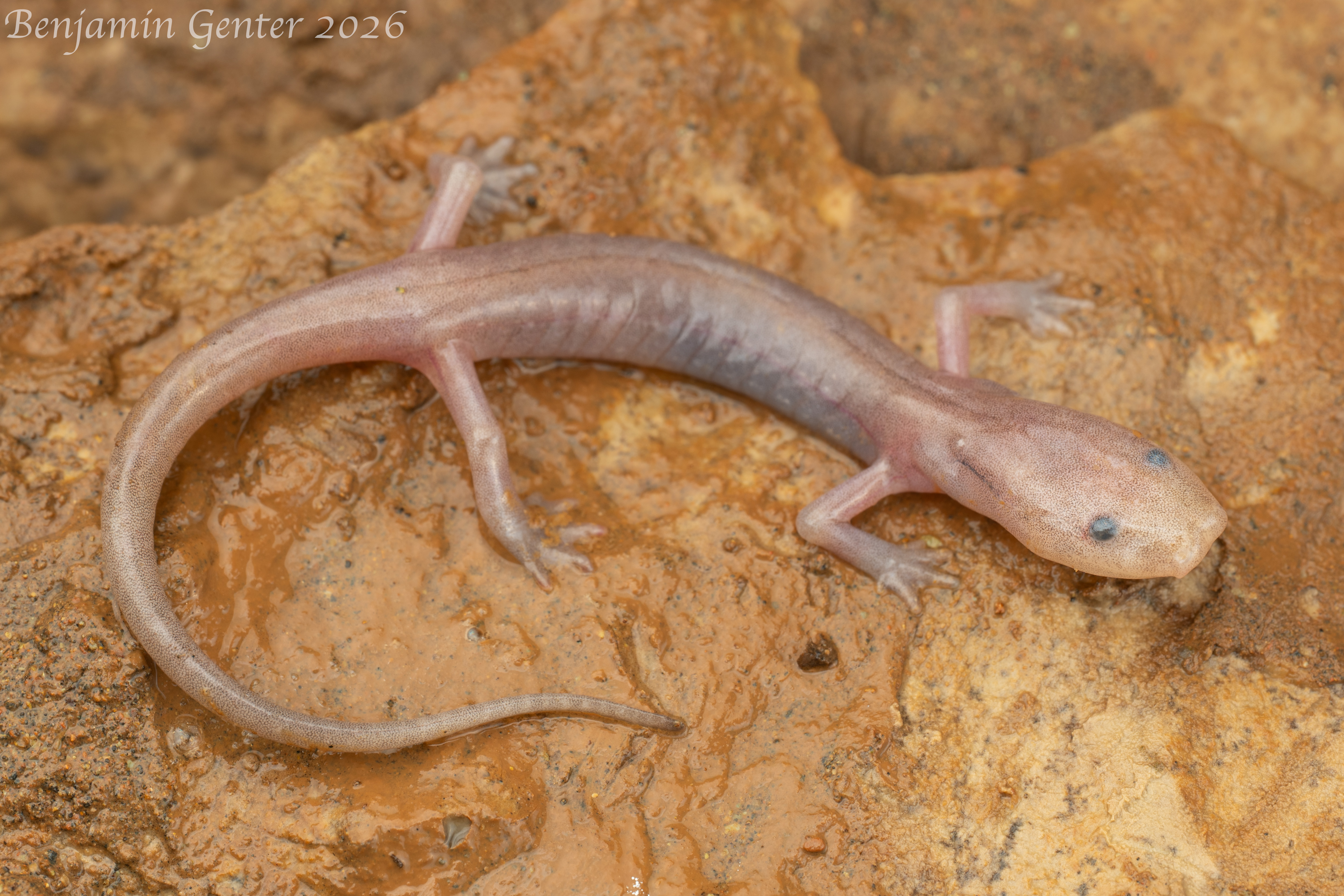

Conservation status
- Least Concern (IUCN 3.1)

Scientific classification
- Kingdom: Animalia
- Phylum: Chordata
- Class: Amphibia
- Order: Urodela
- Family: Plethodontidae
- Genus: Eurycea
- Species: E. braggi

Binomial name
- Eurycea braggi (Smith, 1968)

Synonyms
- Typhlotriton braggi

= Southern grotto salamander =

Species of salamander

The southern grotto salamander (Eurycea braggi) is a species of salamander in the family Plethodontidae. It is endemic to northern Arkansas in the United States.

== Taxonomy ==
It is now considered a member of the genus Eurycea, but was originally described as Typhlotriton braggi.

It was described in 1968, but was later synonymized with the grotto salamander (E. spelaea), but a 2017 study found substantial genetic differences between the clades classified in E. spelaea and once again split them into distinct species. It is thought to have diverged from the northern grotto salamander (E. nerea) during the Late Miocene. All three grotto salamanders are thought to descend from an ancestral surface-dwelling form.

== Distribution and habitat ==
This species is found in the Ozarks of northern Arkansas, where it is found in the East Springfield Plateau. It is found east of the White River basin. It inhabits freshwater springs (as a juvenile), inland karsts, and caves.

== Description ==
This is a troglobitic species that has evolved several troglomorphisms such as a pale coloration and reduced eyesight, much like E. spelaea. Alongside E. spelaea and E. nerea, it is the only blind, troglobitic salamander that undergoes full metamorphosis.
