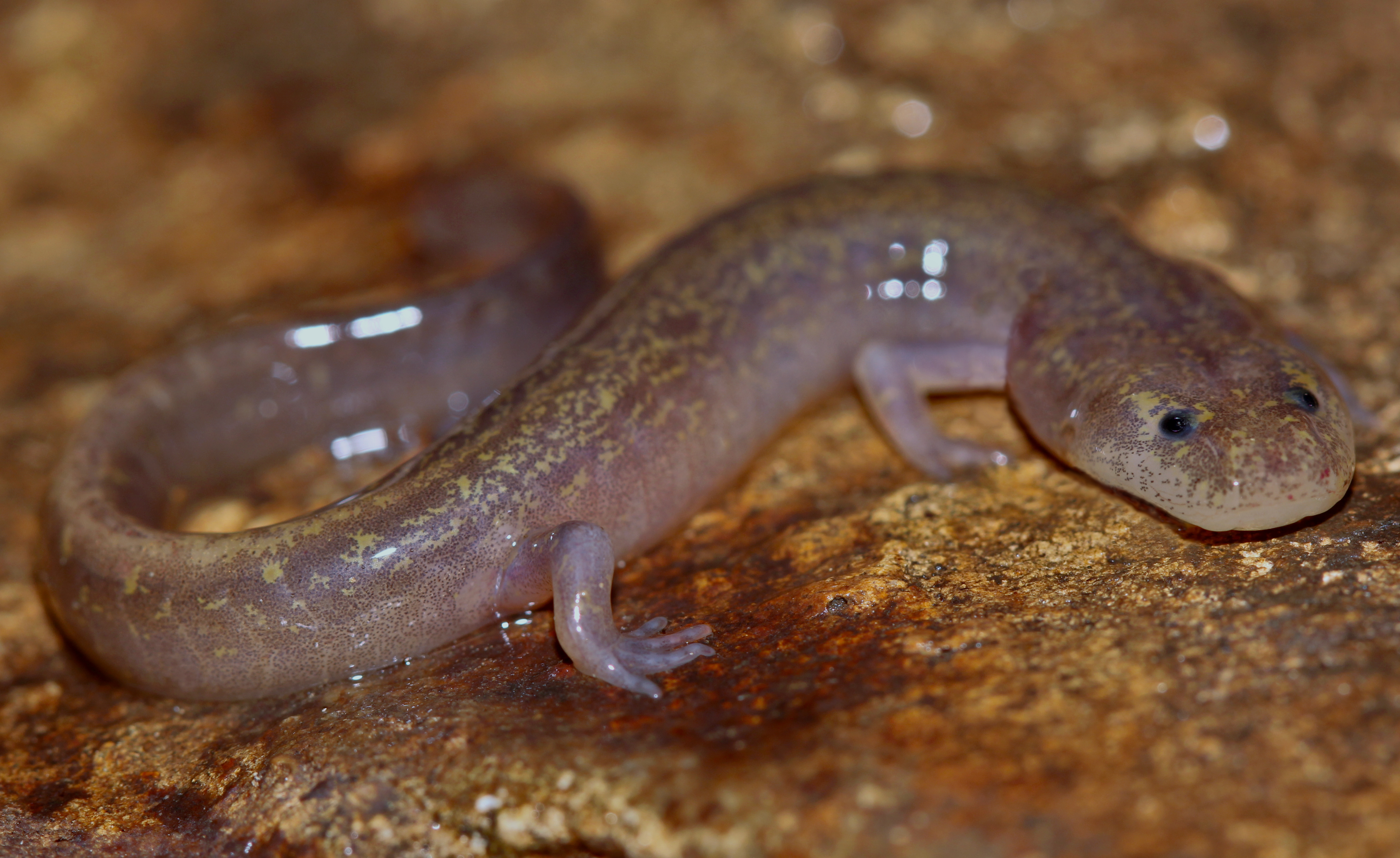
- Recently-metamorphosed individual

Conservation status
- Least Concern (IUCN 3.1)

Scientific classification
- Kingdom: Animalia
- Phylum: Chordata
- Class: Amphibia
- Order: Urodela
- Family: Plethodontidae
- Genus: Eurycea
- Species: E. nerea

Binomial name
- Eurycea nerea (Bishop, 1944)

Synonyms
- Typhlotriton nerea Eurycea nereus

= Northern grotto salamander =

Species of salamander

The northern grotto salamander (Eurycea nerea) is a species of salamander in the family Plethodontidae. It is endemic to the south-central United States.

== Taxonomy ==
It is now considered a member of the genus Eurycea, but was originally described as Typhlotriton nereus.

It was described in 1944, but was later synonymized with the grotto salamander (E. spelaea), but a 2017 study found substantial genetic differences between the clades classified in E. spelaea and once again split them into distinct species. It is thought to have diverged from the southern grotto salamander (E. braggi) during the Late Miocene. All three grotto salamanders are thought to descend from an ancestral surface-dwelling form.

== Distribution and habitat ==
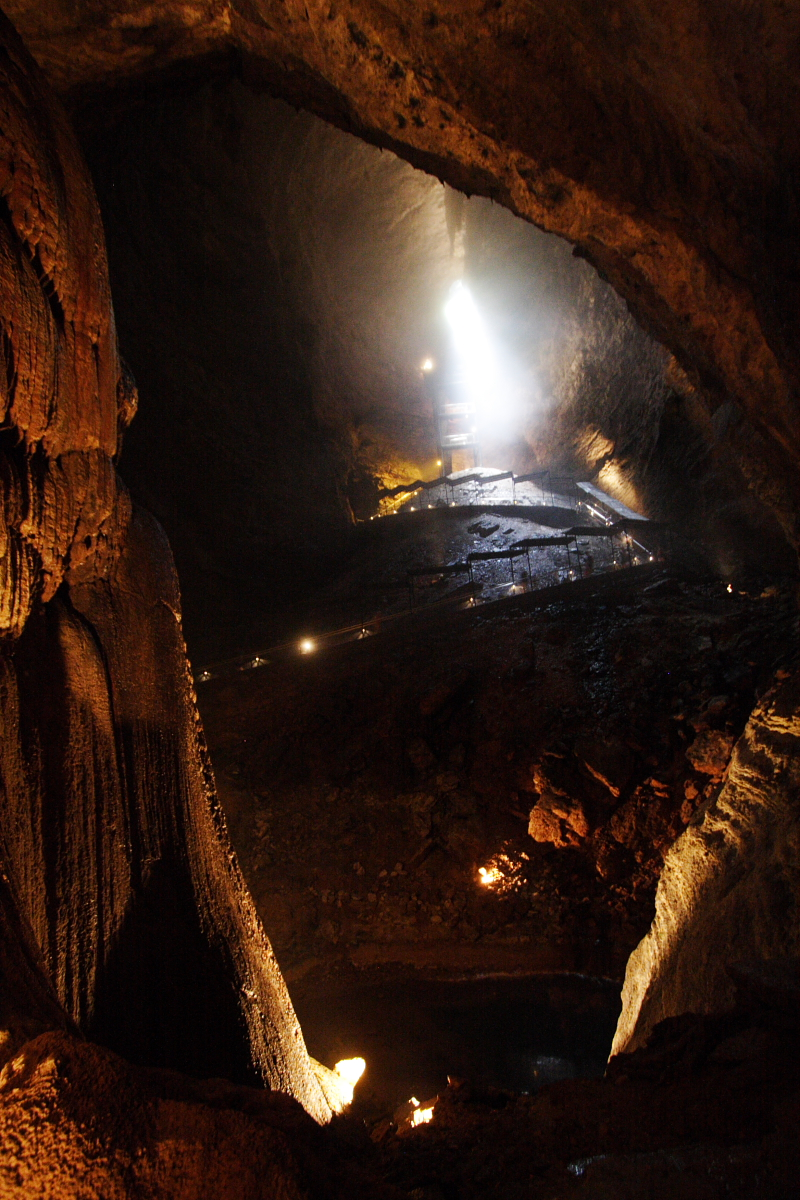
Marvel Cave, a known habitat of the northern grotto salamander.

It is found in the southern Ozark Plateau of Missouri and adjacent portions of Arkansas. It is primarily found in the Salem Plateau and a small portion of the adjacent West Springfield Plateau. It inhabits freshwater springs (as a juvenile), inland karsts, and caves.

== Description ==
This is a troglobitic species that has evolved several troglomorphisms such as a pale coloration and reduced eyesight, much like E. spelaea. Alongside E. spelaea and E. braggi, it is the only blind, troglobitic salamander that undergoes full metamorphosis.
