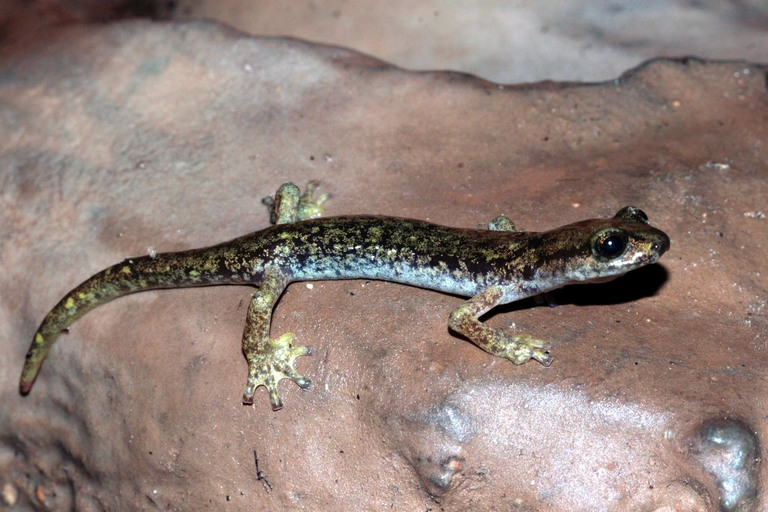

Conservation status
- Endangered (IUCN 3.1)

Scientific classification
- Kingdom: Animalia
- Phylum: Chordata
- Class: Amphibia
- Order: Urodela
- Family: Plethodontidae
- Genus: Speleomantes
- Species: S. supramontis

Binomial name
- Speleomantes supramontis (Lanza, Nascetti & Bullini, 1986)
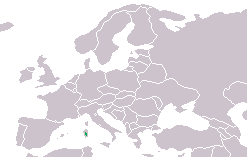

Synonyms
- Hydromantes supramontis Lanza, Nascetti & Bullini, 1986

= Supramonte cave salamander =

Species of amphibian

The Supramonte cave salamander (Speleomantes supramontis) is a species of salamander in the family Plethodontidae, endemic to the island of Sardinia (Italy).

Its natural habitats are temperate forests, rocky areas, caves, and subterranean habitats (other than caves).

It is threatened by habitat loss.
