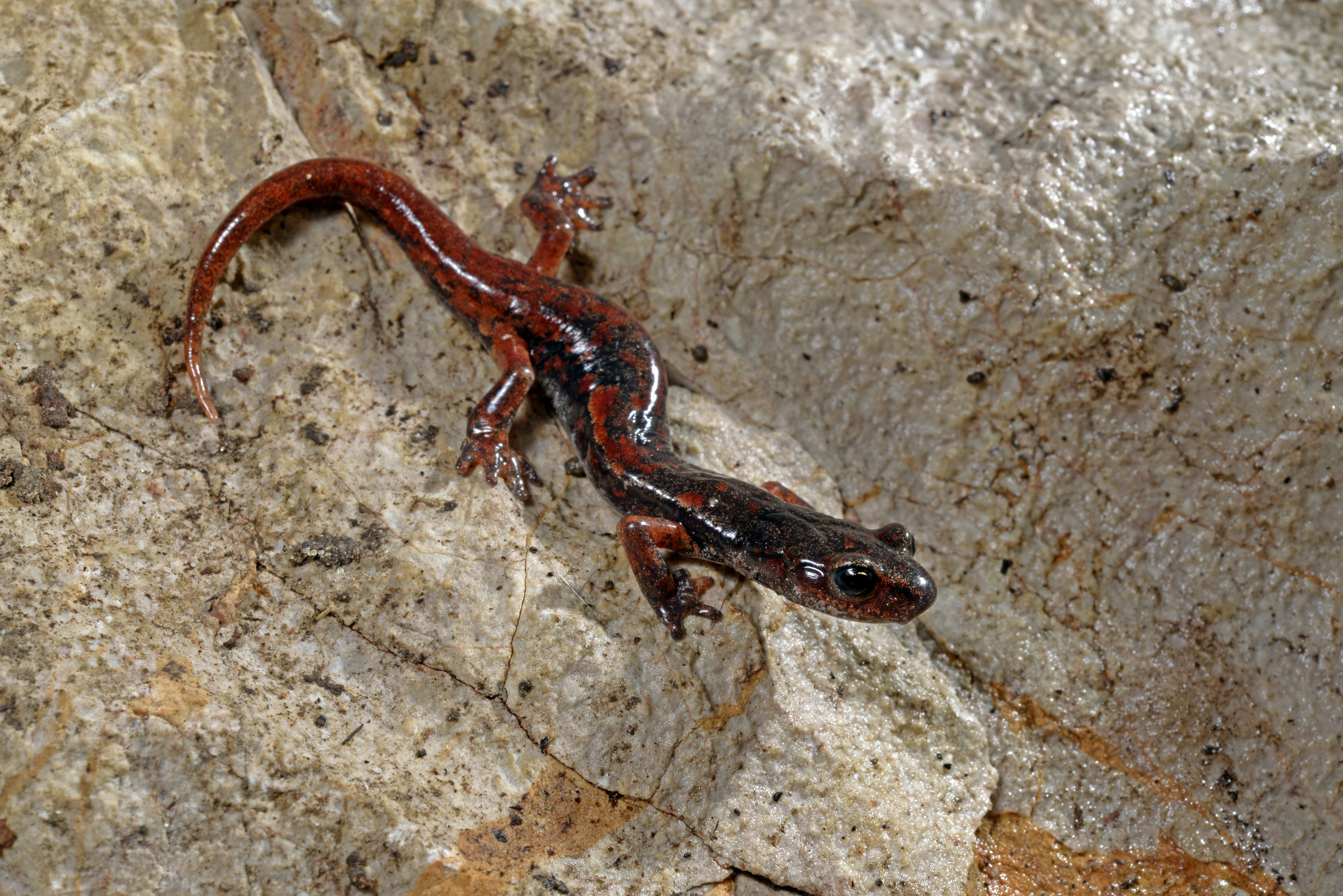

Conservation status
- Endangered (IUCN 3.1)

Scientific classification
- Kingdom: Animalia
- Phylum: Chordata
- Class: Amphibia
- Order: Urodela
- Family: Plethodontidae
- Genus: Speleomantes
- Species: S. italicus

Binomial name
- Speleomantes italicus (Dunn, 1923)
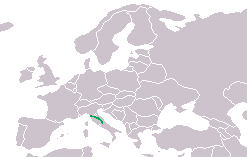

Synonyms
- Hydromantes italicus Dunn, 1923

= Italian cave salamander =

Species of amphibian

The Italian cave salamander (Speleomantes italicus) is a species of salamander in the family Plethodontidae. Endemic to Italy, its natural habitats are temperate forests, rocky areas, caves, and subterranean habitats (other than caves). It is threatened by habitat loss.

== Description ==
The Italian cave salamander is a slender species with short limbs and grows to a length of about 12.5 cm (5 in) including a short tail. The head is broad with prominent eyes and there is a distinct groove between the nostrils and the edge of the lips. The feet are partially webbed. It is dark in colour with mottled reddish or yellowish markings and a dark belly. In the north of its range it is more variable in colour and sometimes hybridises with Ambrosi's cave salamander (Speleomantes ambrosii).

== Distribution and habitat ==
The Italian cave salamander is native to northern Italy where it is found in the northern and central Apennine Mountains. Its range extends from the Province of Lucca and Province of Reggio Emilia southwards to the Province of Pescara. It is found in wooded valleys, on rocky outcrops and in caves and underground waters, often in limestone areas, at altitudes of up to 1,600 metres (5,200 ft) above sea level.

An introduced population of this salamander exists in an abandoned quarry in a beech forest near Holzminden, Germany. It is hypothesized that the salamanders have been there for as long as a century, as there was a family in the area that owned both an animal import business and several nearby quarries back in the early 20th century.

== Behaviour ==
The Italian cave salamander is usually found in areas of limestone rock, but sometimes in sandstone or ophiolitic areas. It is agile, climbing on cave walls and rocky outcrops. The female lays a small clutch of eggs in a crevice and these hatch by direct development into miniature salamanders. It seems to be an opportunistic hunter with a wide range of invertebrate prey.

== Status ==
The International Union for Conservation of Nature has assessed the Italian cave salamander as being endangered. This is on the basis that, although it is common over much of its range, its total extent of occurrence is less than 20,000 square kilometres (7,700 sq mi) and suitable habitat may be declining locally.
