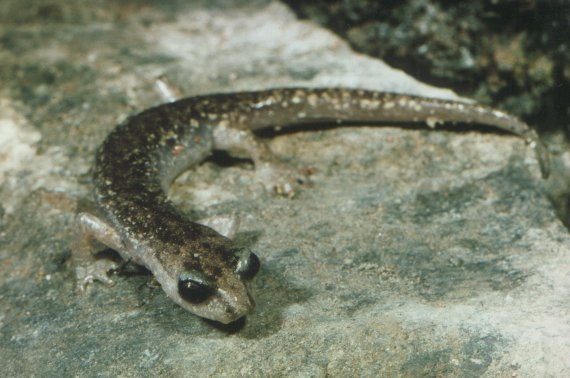

Conservation status
- Vulnerable (IUCN 3.1)

Scientific classification
- Kingdom: Animalia
- Phylum: Chordata
- Class: Amphibia
- Order: Urodela
- Family: Plethodontidae
- Genus: Speleomantes
- Species: S. genei

Binomial name
- Speleomantes genei (Temminck & Schlegel, 1838)

Synonyms
- Hydromantes genei Temminck & Schlegel, 1838; Atylodes genei (Temminck and Schlegel, 1838)

= Brown cave salamander =

Species of amphibian

The brown cave salamander (Speleomantes genei), also known as Gene's cave salamander, Sardinian cave salamander, or simply Sardinian salamander, is a species of salamander in the family Plethodontidae. It is endemic to Sardinia (Italy). Its natural habitats are temperate forests, rocky areas, caves, and subterranean habitats (other than caves). It is threatened by habitat loss.
