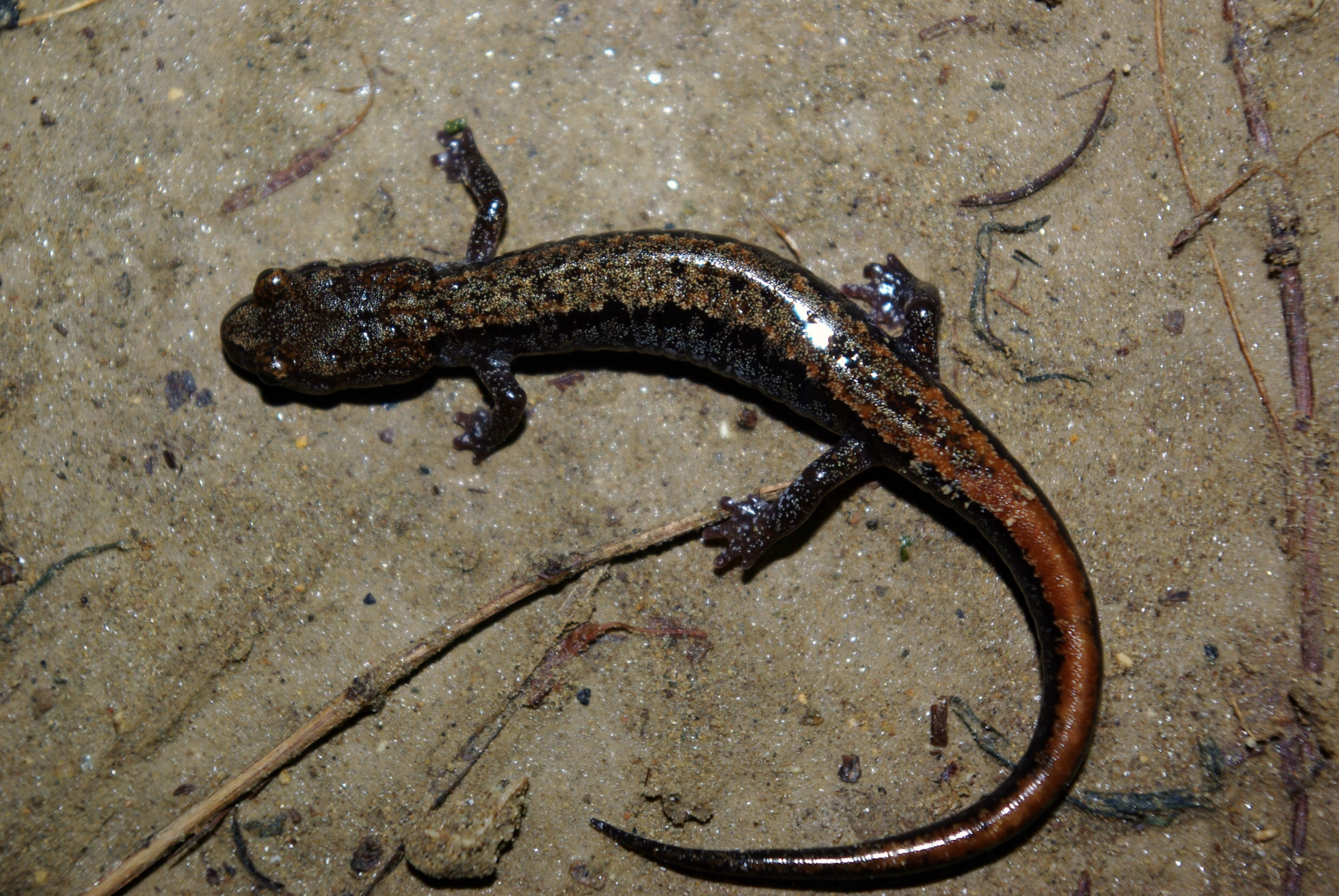

Conservation status
- Least Concern (IUCN 3.1)

Scientific classification
- Kingdom: Animalia
- Phylum: Chordata
- Class: Amphibia
- Order: Urodela
- Family: Plethodontidae
- Genus: Karsenia; Min et al., 2005
- Species: K. koreana

Binomial name
- Karsenia koreana Min et al., 2005

= Korean crevice salamander =

Species of salamander

The Korean crevice salamander (Karsenia koreana) is a species of lungless salamander. It dwells under rocks in limestone forest areas of the Korean Peninsula. It was discovered by Stephen J. Karsen, an American science teacher working in Daejeon, South Korea, in 2003, and described in 2005. Although plethodontid salamanders comprise seventy percent of salamander species worldwide, Karsenia koreana is the first member of this taxon known from Asia. Like other plethodontids, it lacks lungs and breathes through its moist skin. It is the only species in the genus Karsenia.

== Systematics and biogeography ==
Cladistic analysis using Bayesian analysis of molecular data places Karsenia koreana as sister group to the clade containing Aneides and the desmognathine salamanders. This implies that plethodontid salamanders may have had a worldwide range 60 to 100 million years ago. As the global climate cooled, New World taxa thrived while Old World populations declined. Other plants and animals currently found in Asia and North America share close relationships, showing a similar pattern of biogeography.

== Description ==
Males measure 38.5–47.7 mm (1.52–1.88 in) and females 38.5–47.7 mm (1.52–1.88 in) in snout–vent length. The habitus is moderately robust. The head is relatively broad. The eyes are small and moderately protuberant. There are 14–15 costal grooves. The tail is round basally but becomes in some individuals laterally compressed towards its tip. Complete tail (i.e., non-regenerated) is about as long as the snout–vent length. The species is darkly pigmented. There is a broad dorsal stripe of variable color (reddish to yellowish brown, tan, or dark brown) and distinctness (prominent and bright to obscure). The lateral surfaces are uniformly dark but have an obscure overlay of small, whitish speckles. The ventral surfaces are pale with moderately large, whitish flecks that are absent along the midline.

== Habitat and conservation ==
The species occurs in damp talus slopes and rockslides of limestone in young forests dominated by Pinus densiflora and Quercus mongolica, mostly under small stones. Although the species is considered locally common, and reasonably widespread (as of 2006, it was known from more than 20 sites), it has not been well studied in the field. Thus, its natural history, population dynamics, and reproductive behavior remain unknown.
