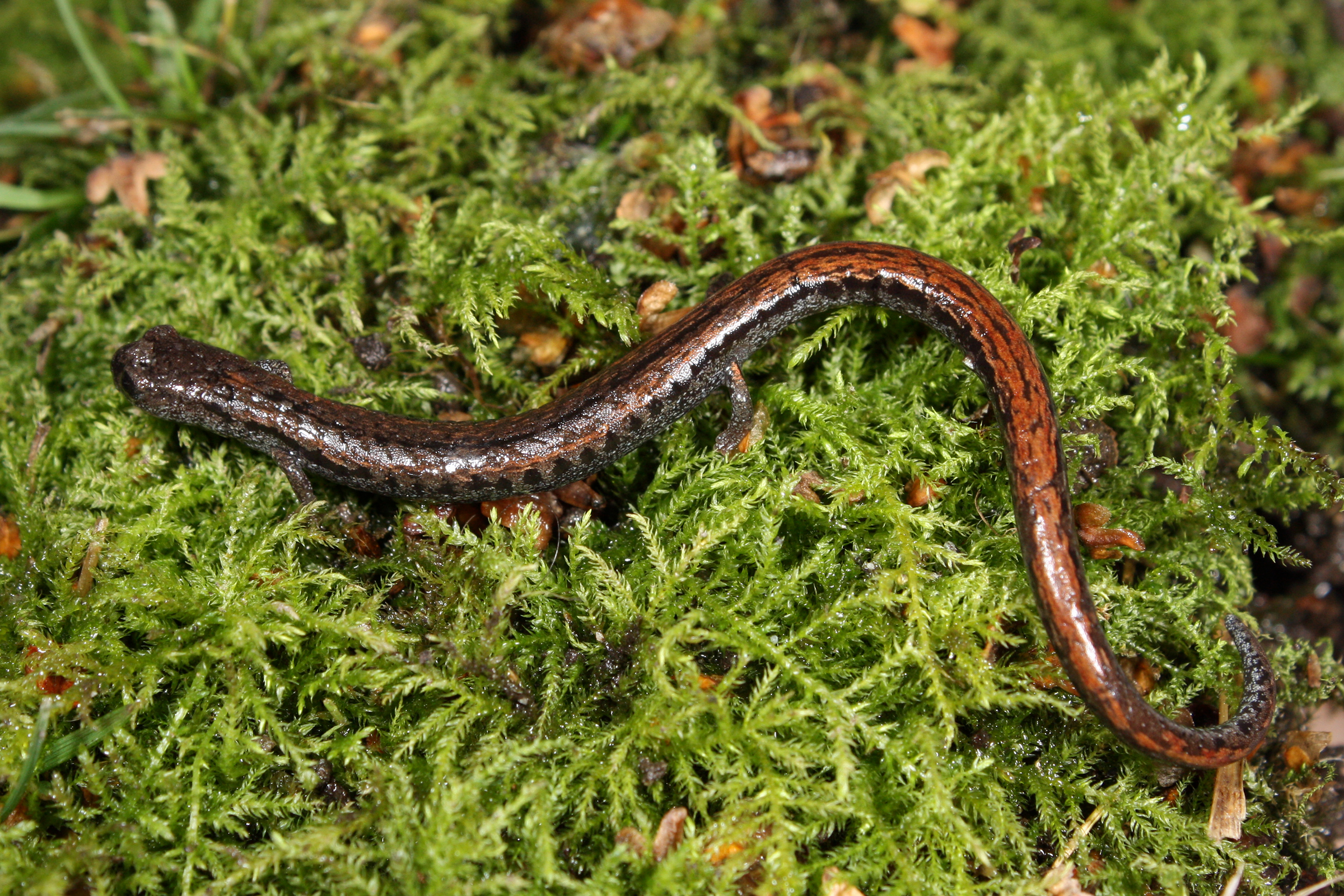
- California slender salamander (Batrachoseps attenuatus)

Scientific classification
- Kingdom: Animalia
- Phylum: Chordata
- Class: Amphibia
- Order: Urodela
- Suborder: Salamandroidea
- Family: Plethodontidae; Gray, 1850

Subgroups
- Hemidactyliinae; †Palaeoplethodon; Plethodontinae
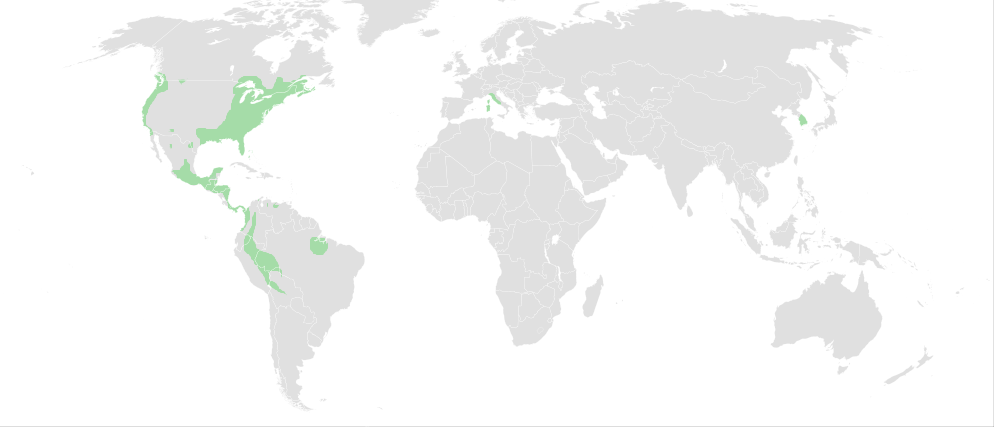
- Native distribution of plethodontids (in green)

= Plethodontidae =

Lungless salamander Temporal range: Oligocene–Present

Family of salamanders

Plethodontidae, or lungless salamanders, are a family of salamanders. With over 500 species, lungless salamanders are by far the largest family of salamanders in terms of their diversity. Most species are native to the Western Hemisphere, from British Columbia to Brazil. Only two extant genera occur in the Eastern Hemisphere: Speleomantes (native to Sardinia and mainland Europe south of the Alps) and Karsenia (native to South Korea).

== Biology ==
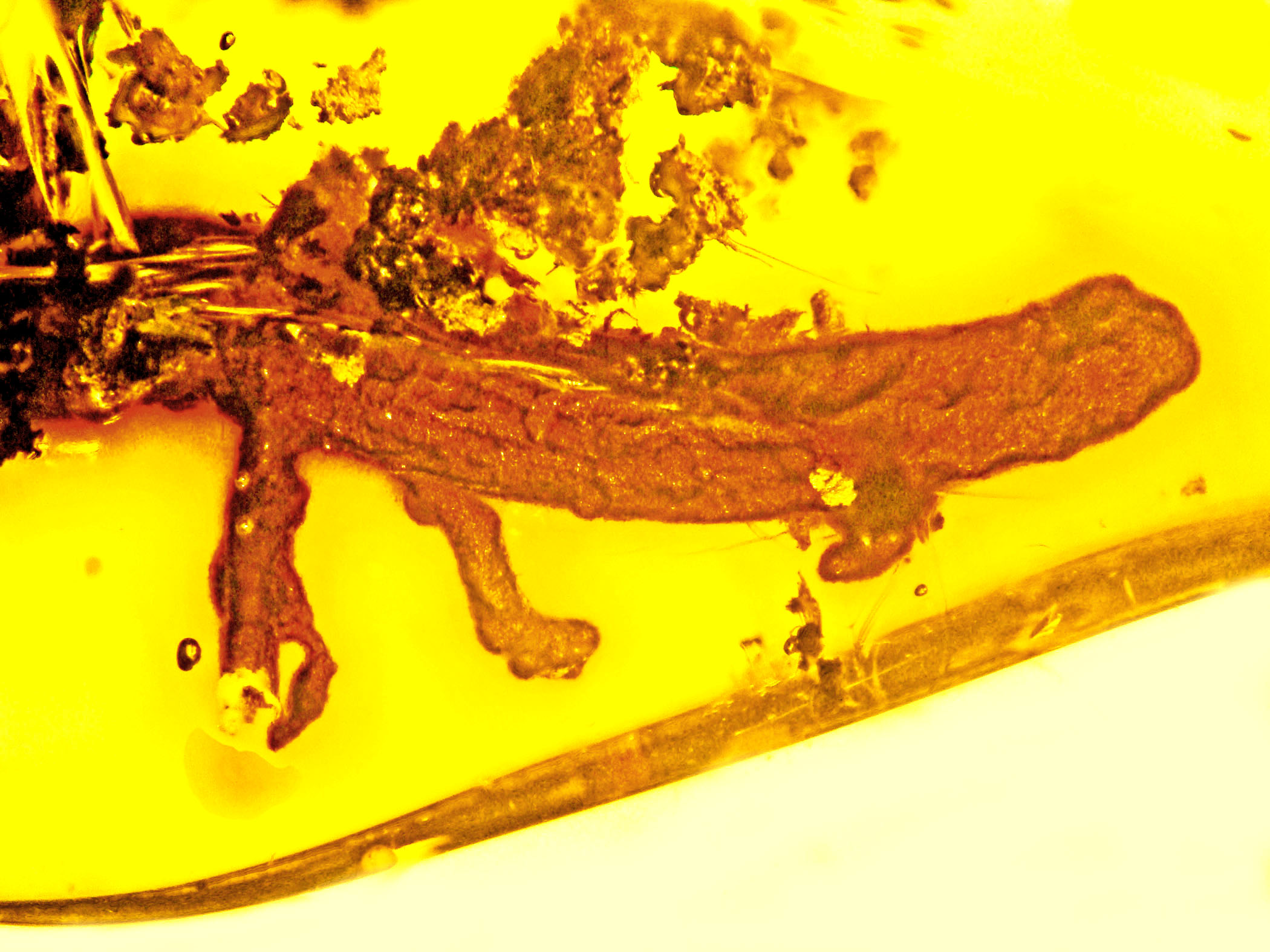
Palaeoplethodon hispaniolae preserved in amber

Adult lungless salamanders have four limbs, with four toes on the fore limbs, and usually with five on the hind limbs. Within many species, mating and reproduction occur solely on land. Accordingly, many species also lack an aquatic larval stage, a phenomenon known as direct development in which the offspring hatch as fully-formed, miniature adults. Direct development is correlated with changes in the developmental characteristics of plethodontids compared to other families of salamanders including increases in egg size and duration of embryonic development. Additionally, the evolutionary loss of the aquatic larval stage is related to a diminishing dependence on aquatic habitats for reproduction. The lift of this constraint allowed widespread colonization and diversification within a broad number of terrestrial habitats which is a testament to the high success and proliferation of Plethodontidae.

The largest species of lungless salamanders, Bell's false brook salamander, can reach lengths of 36 cm (14 in).

Many species have a projectile tongue and hyoid apparatus, which they can fire almost a body length at high speed to capture prey.

Measured in individual numbers, they are very successful animals where they occur. In some places, they make up the dominant biomass of vertebrates. An estimated 1.88 billion individuals of the southern redback salamander inhabit just one district of Mark Twain National Forest alone, about 1,400 tons of biomass. Due to their modest size and low metabolism, they are able to feed on prey such as springtails, which are usually too small for other terrestrial vertebrates. This gives them access to a whole ecological niche with minimal competition from other groups.

=== Courtship and mating ===
Plethodontids exhibit highly stereotyped and complex mating behaviors and courtship rituals that are not present in any other salamander family. Mating behavior tends to be uniform among all plethodontids and typically involves a tail-straddle walk in which the female orients her head at the base of the male's tail while also straddling the tail with her body. The male will twist his body around and deposit a sperm capsule, known as the spermatophore, on the substrate in front of the female's snout. As the male leads the female over the spermatophore with his tail, the female lowers her cloaca onto the spermatophore and lodges the sperm mass inside while leaving the base of the spermatophore on the ground.

Within many species of plethodontidae, the courtship ritual is often accompanied by transfer of male pheromones during the tail-straddling walk. During the breeding period, males will grow enlarged anterior teeth used to scratch the female's skin on her head as a part of the courtship ritual. Subsequently, the male will rub pheromones onto the abraded spot which are secreted from a pad of tissue called the mental gland located underneath the male's chin.

Courtship pheromones greatly increase male mating success for a variety of reasons. Overall, the pheromone secretions increase female receptivity to courtship and sperm transfer. This not only increases the likelihood of successful mating with a specific female, but also shortens the duration of courtship which is important because it minimizes the chance of the male being interrupted by other competing males.

In scientific literature discussing the variations between the mental glands of plethodontid salamanders, it was discovered that male plethodontids had minor variations in height and diameter of the simple tubular glands, and major variation was found in the diameter of the secretory granules. This is attributed to the fact that males can mate throughout all months of the year, while females oviposit seasonally.

=== Respiration ===
A number of features distinguish the plethodontids from other salamanders. Most significantly, they lack lungs, conducting respiration through their skin, and the tissues lining their mouths. Some species of cave salamanders are neotenic, and keep their larval gills even as adults. Gills are absent in all other adult plethodontids. Plethodontids possess costal grooves on the trunk of their bodies. These help keep the skin moist via water transport over the surface of the body.

Plethodontid salamanders are almost entirely reliant on cutaneous respiration. Approximately 83%–93% of oxygen uptake is through this method. Plethodontid salamander respiration rates are constrained by their SA:V, and higher SA:Vs are correlated to warmer, wetter climates.

Plethodontids are constantly exposed to air or water, which allows for constant gas exchange that is not limited by ventilation. Oxygen uptake is identical in water and air, assuming the partial pressure of oxygen is the same. Oxygenated and non-oxygenated blood are mixed together in the venous system, which causes the partial pressure of oxygen within cardiac blood to typically be low.

Plethodontids can tolerate hypoxia for prolonged periods by reducing their metabolic rate instead of by relying on anaerobic cutaneous respiration, as initially theorized.

Plethodontids have been observed to develop rudimentary lungs as embryos. The lung rudiment develops similarly to that of non-plethodontid salamanders for the first three weeks of development and then begins to regress through apoptosis.

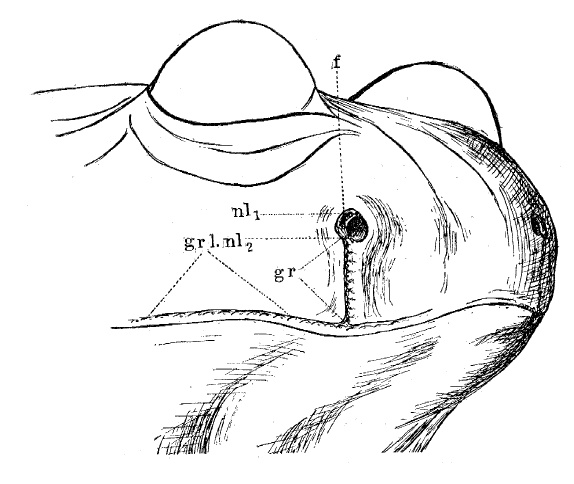
The nasiolabal groove of a dusky salamander

A paralogue of the SFTPC gene, which is expressed exclusively in the lungs in other vertebrates, is in lungless salamanders expressed in the larval integument instead. When going through metamorphosis, it disappears from the integument and appears in the buccopharynx in adults. It is suggested the gene facilitate extrapulmonary respiration through the production of pulmonary surfactant-like secretions.

=== Chemoreception ===
Another distinctive feature is the presence of a vertical slit between the nostril and upper lip, known as the "nasolabial groove". The groove is lined with glands, and enhances the salamander's chemoreception which is correlated with a higher degree of olfactory lobe and nasal mucous membrane development in plethodontids. The presence of this specialized structure is likely related to the absence of lungs in these salamanders. Though some lunged salamanders do exhibit similar structures, they are reduced in size and are not arranged near the nostrils (i.e. nares) in the same fashion as plethodontids. Due to the fact that plethodontids cannot generate air pressure via expulsion of air from the lungs and through the nares, they are presented with the challenge of removing water and debris from the nasal passages which has the potential to significantly limit olfactory processes. As such, the nasolabial grooves are structured in a way that maximizes drainage from the nose. The groove is deeper and more narrow directly around the nares and the orifices of the glands are slightly elevated both of which aid in the gravitational flow of fluid from the nares and nasal depression. Additionally, the nasolabial glands around the margins of the nares secrete a fatty film which further encourages the removal of water from the nasal passages due to differences in polarity between water and the lipid secretions.

== Evolutionary history ==
Plethodontidae are estimated to have split from their sister group Amphiumidae around the K-Pg boundary, and to have diversified during the Paleogene. The origin region of the family is North America, with oldest of the European members of the family known from the Middle Miocene of Slovakia.

== Subfamilies and genera ==
The family Plethodontidae consists of two extant subfamilies and about 516 to 520 species divided among 29 genera, making up the majority of known salamander species:

Subfamily	Genus, scientific name, and author	Common name	Species
Hemidactyliinae; Hallowell, 1856
Hemidactyliinae; Hallowell, 1856	Aquiloeurycea Rovito, Parra-Olea, Recuero, and Wake, 2015		6 - 7
Hemidactyliinae; Hallowell, 1856	Batrachoseps Bonaparte, 1839	Slender salamanders	23
Hemidactyliinae; Hallowell, 1856	Bolitoglossa Duméril, Bibron & Duméril, 1854	Tropical climbing salamanders	139 - 140
Hemidactyliinae; Hallowell, 1856	Bradytriton Wake & Elias, 1983	Finca Chiblac salamander	1
Hemidactyliinae; Hallowell, 1856	Chiropterotriton Taylor, 1944	Splay-foot salamanders	23
Hemidactyliinae; Hallowell, 1856	Cryptotriton García-París & Wake, 2000	Hidden salamanders	7
Hemidactyliinae; Hallowell, 1856	Dendrotriton Wake & Elias, 1983	Bromeliad salamanders	8
Hemidactyliinae; Hallowell, 1856	Eurycea Rafinesque, 1822	North American brook salamanders	34
Hemidactyliinae; Hallowell, 1856	Gyrinophilus Cope, 1869	Spring salamanders	4
Hemidactyliinae; Hallowell, 1856	Hemidactylium Tschudi, 1838	Four-toed salamanders	1
Hemidactyliinae; Hallowell, 1856	Isthmura Dubois and Raffaelli, 2012		7
Hemidactyliinae; Hallowell, 1856	Ixalotriton Wake and Johnson, 1989	Jumping salamanders	2
Hemidactyliinae; Hallowell, 1856	Nototriton Wake & Elias, 1983	Moss salamanders	22
Hemidactyliinae; Hallowell, 1856	Nyctanolis Elias & Wake, 1983	Long-limbed salamanders	1
Hemidactyliinae; Hallowell, 1856	Oedipina Keferstein, 1868	Worm salamanders	40
Hemidactyliinae; Hallowell, 1856	Parvimolge Taylor, 1944	Tropical dwarf salamanders	1
Hemidactyliinae; Hallowell, 1856	Pseudoeurycea Taylor, 1944	False brook salamanders	41
Hemidactyliinae; Hallowell, 1856	Pseudotriton Tschudi, 1838	Mud and red salamanders	2 - 4
Hemidactyliinae; Hallowell, 1856	Stereochilus Cope, 1869	Many-lined salamanders	1
Hemidactyliinae; Hallowell, 1856	Thorius Cope, 1869	Minute salamanders	29
Hemidactyliinae; Hallowell, 1856	Urspelerpes Camp, Peterman, Milanovich, Lamb, Maerz, and Wake, 2009	Patch-nosed salamanders	1
Plethodontinae; Gray, 1850
Plethodontinae; Gray, 1850	Aneides Baird, 1851	Climbing salamanders	10
Plethodontinae; Gray, 1850	Desmognathus Baird, 1850	Dusky salamanders	39
Plethodontinae; Gray, 1850	Ensatina Gray, 1850	Ensatinas	1
Plethodontinae; Gray, 1850	Hydromantes Gistel, 1848	Web-toed salamanders	5
Plethodontinae; Gray, 1850	Karsenia Min, Yang, Bonett, Vieites, Brandon & Wake, 2005	Korean crevice salamanders	1
Plethodontinae; Gray, 1850	Phaeognathus Highton, 1961	Red Hills salamanders	1
Plethodontinae; Gray, 1850	Plethodon Tschudi, 1838	Slimy and mountain salamanders	58
Plethodontinae; Gray, 1850	Speleomantes Dubois, 1984	European cave salamanders	8

Following a major revision in 2006, the genus Haideotriton was found to be a synonym of Eurycea, while the genus Lineatriton were made synonyms of Pseudoeurycea.

A single hemidactyliine (Palaeoplethodon) is known from Miocene fossil remains preserved in Dominican amber, marking the only record of salamanders in the Caribbean.

== Conservation status ==
Conservation Status of Plethodontidae According to IUCN Redlist (2020)
Status	Number of Species
Least Concern	94
Near Threatened	39
Vulnerable	60
Endangered	88
Critically Endangered	68
Extinct	1
Data Deficient	40
