= List of amphibians of California =

Species that are probably extirpated are indicated with an asterisk (*).

== Order Anura ==
=== Family Ascaphidae ===
Image	Species	Common name
	Ascaphus truei	Coast tailed frog

=== Family Bufonidae ===
Image	Species	Common name
	Incilius alvarius	Sonoran desert toad *
	Anaxyrus boreas halophilus	Western toad
	Anaxyrus californicus	Arroyo toad
	Anaxyrus canorus ^{[e]}	Yosemite toad
	Anaxyrus cognatus	Great Plains toad
	Anaxyrus exsul ^{[e]}	Black toad
	Anaxyrus microscaphus	Arizona toad *
	Anaxyrus punctatus	Red-spotted toad
	Anaxyrus woodhousii	Woodhouse's toad

=== Family Hylidae ===
Image	Species	Common name
	Pseudacris cadaverina	California chorus frog
	Pseudacris hypochondriaca	Southern Pacific chorus frog
	Pseudacris regilla	Northern Pacific chorus frog
	Pseudacris sierra	Central Pacific chorus frog

=== Family Scaphiopodidae ===
Image	Species	Common name
	Scaphiopus couchii	Couch's spadefoot
	Spea hammondii	Western spadefoot
	Spea intermontana	Great Basin spadefoot

=== Family Ranidae ===
Image	Species	Common name
	Lithobates berlandieri ^{[i]}	Rio Grande leopard frog
	Lithobates catesbeianus ^{[i]}	American bullfrog
	Lithobates pipiens	Northern leopard frog
	Lithobates sphenocephalus ^{[i]}	Southern leopard frog *
	Lithobates yavapaiensis	Lowland leopard frog *
	Rana aurora	Northern red-legged frog
	Rana boylii	Foothill yellow-legged frog
	Rana cascadae	Cascades frog
	Rana draytonii	California red-legged frog
	Rana luteiventris	Columbia spotted frog *
	Rana muscosa ^{[e]}	Southern mountain yellow-legged frog
	Rana pretiosa	Oregon spotted frog *
	Rana sierrae	Sierra Nevada yellow-legged frog

=== Family Eleutherodactylidae ===
Image	Species	Common name
	Eleutherodactylus coqui^{[i]}	Common coquí

=== Family Pipidae ===
Image	Species	Common name
	Xenopus laevis ^{[i]}	African clawed frog

== Order Caudata ==
=== Family Ambystomatidae ===
Image	Species	Common name
	Ambystoma californiense ^{[e]}	California tiger salamander
	Ambystoma gracile	Northwestern salamander
	Ambystoma macrodactylum	Long-toed salamander
	Ambystoma mavortium^{[i]}	Barred tiger salamander

=== Family Dicamptodontidae ===
Image	Species	Common name
	Dicamptodon ensatus ^{[e]}	California giant salamander
	Dicamptodon tenebrosus	Pacific giant salamander

=== Family Plethodontidae ===
Image	Species	Common name
	Aneides ferreus	Clouded salamander
	Aneides flavipunctatus	Speckled black salamander
	Aneides iecanus	Shasta black salamander
	Aneides klamathensis	Klamath black salamander
	Aneides lugubris	Arboreal salamander
	Aneides niger	Santa Cruz black salamander
	Aneides vagrans ^{[e]}	Wandering salamander
	Batrachoseps altasierrae	Greenhorn Mountains slender salamander
	Batrachoseps attenuatus	California slender salamander
	Batrachoseps bramei	Fairview slender salamander
	Batrachoseps campi ^{[e]}	Inyo Mountains slender salamander
	Batrachoseps diabolicus ^{[e]}	Hell Hollow slender salamander
	Batrachoseps gabrieli ^{[e]}	San Gabriel Mountains slender salamander
	Batrachoseps gavilanensis ^{[e]}	Gabilan Mountains slender salamander
	Batrachoseps gregarius ^{[e]}	Gregarious slender salamander
	Batrachoseps incognitus ^{[e]}	San Simeon slender salamander
	Batrachoseps kawia ^{[e]}	Sequoia slender salamander
	Batrachoseps luciae ^{[e]}	Santa Lucia Mountains slender salamander
	Batrachoseps major	Garden slender salamander
	Batrachoseps minor ^{[e]}	Lesser slender salamander
	Batrachoseps nigriventris ^{[e]}	Black-bellied slender salamander
	Batrachoseps pacificus ^{[e]}	Channel Islands slender salamander
	Batrachoseps regius ^{[e]}	Kings River slender salamander
	Batrachoseps relictus ^{[e]}	Relictual slender salamander
	Batrachoseps robustus ^{[e]}	Kern Plateau slender salamander
	Batrachoseps simatus ^{[e]}	Kern Canyon slender salamander
	Batrachoseps stebbinsi ^{[e]}	Tehachapi slender salamander
	Batrachoseps wakei	Arguello slender salamander^{[e]}
	Ensatina eschscholtzii	Ensatina
	Hydromantes brunus ^{[e]}	Limestone salamander
	Hydromantes platycephalus ^{[e]}	Mount Lyell salamander
	Hydromantes samweli^{[e]}	Samwel Shasta salamander
	Hydromantes shastae ^{[e]}	Shasta salamander
	Hydromantes wintu ^{[e]}	Windu Shasta salamander
	Plethodon asupak ^{[e]}	Scott Bar salamander
	Plethodon dunni	Dunn's salamander
	Plethodon elongatus	Del Norte salamander
	Plethodon stormi	Siskiyou Mountains salamander

=== Family Rhyacotritonidae ===
Image	Species	Common name
	Rhyacotriton variegatus	Southern torrent salamander

=== Family Salamandridae ===
Image	Species	Common name
	Taricha granulosa	Rough-skinned newt
	Taricha rivularis ^{[e]}	Red-bellied newt
	Taricha sierrae ^{[e]}	Sierra Nevada newt
	Taricha torosa ^{[e]}	California newt
