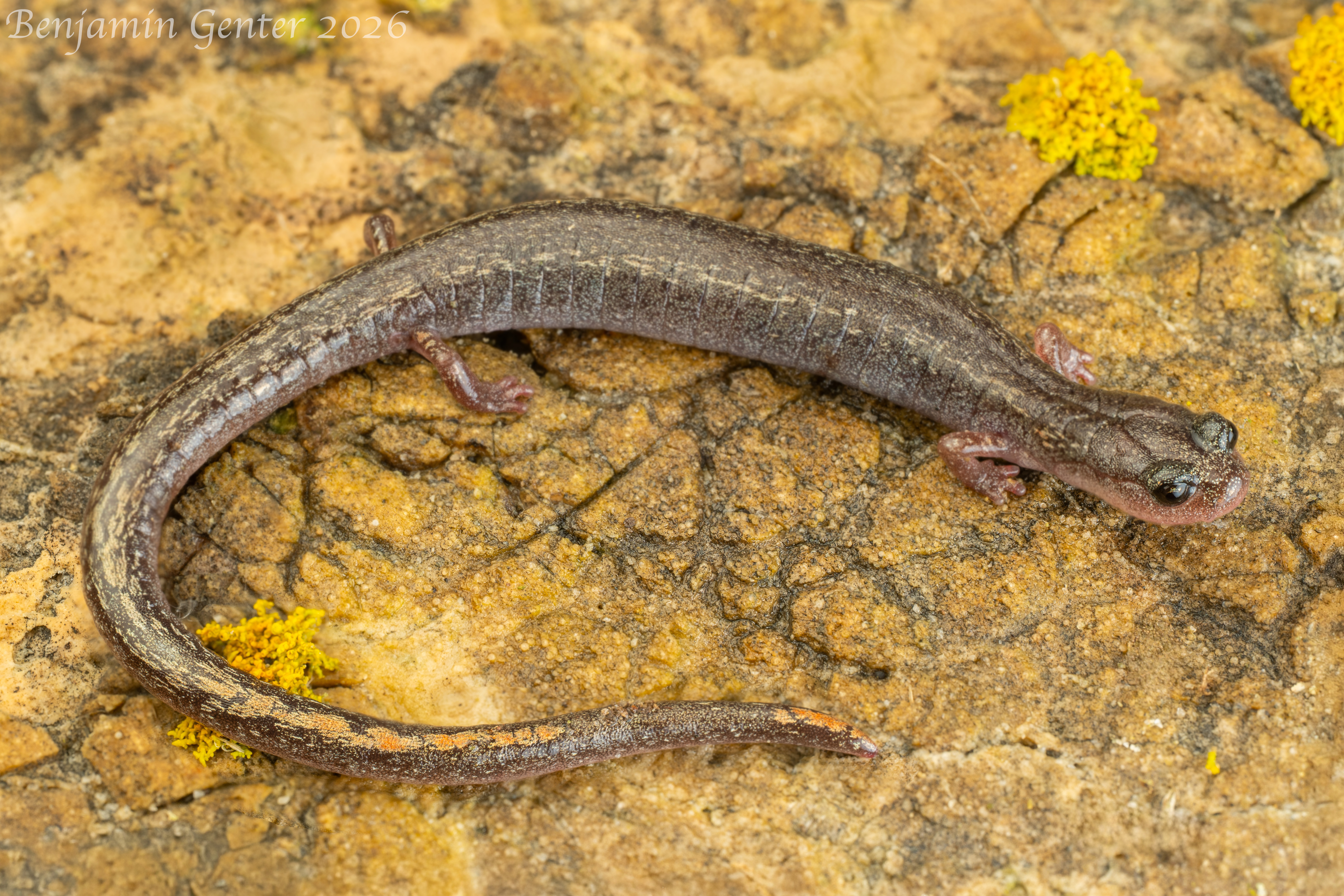

Conservation status
- Critically Imperiled (NatureServe)

Scientific classification
- Kingdom: Animalia
- Phylum: Chordata
- Class: Amphibia
- Order: Urodela
- Family: Plethodontidae
- Genus: Batrachoseps
- Species: B. wakei

Binomial name
- Batrachoseps wakei Sweet and Jockusch, 2021

= Arguello slender salamander =

Species of salamander

The Arguello slender salamander (Batrachoseps wakei) is a species of salamander in the family Plethodontidae. It is endemic to California, where it is found only in a small area of coastal Santa Barbara County.

== Taxonomy ==
It was discovered in 2006, when an individual was found in the debris of an abandoned Coast Guard station at Vandenberg Space Force Base. Although this range was within that of the black-bellied slender salamander (B. nigriventris), this individual was clearly distinctive from B. nigriventris and more closely resembled the Channel Islands slender salamander (B. pacificus); due to this, it was thought to represent an introduced population of B. pacificus. However, phylogenetic analysis found it to fall outside the B. pacificus clade, and to be an undescribed species that was sister to the clade comprising B. pacificus and the garden slender salamander (B. major). It was described in 2021 as Batrachoseps wakei, the specific epithet honoring famed herpetologist David B. Wake, who described many species of Batrachoseps and had died a few months prior to the publishing of the paper.

It is likely that this species evolved due the activity of the Southern California faults, with tectonic activity transporting the land inhabited by the ancestral Batrachoseps north and isolating it from its closest relatives, causing it to diverge into a distinct species.

== Distribution ==
It is restricted to a narrow marine terrace centered on Point Arguello. It is thought to be a relict species with a very small range.

== Description ==
This is a relatively large Batrachoseps species with a dorsal pattern of vermiculate tan markings. Males can grow to 65 mm (2.6 in) and females to 68 mm (2.7 in) in snout–vent length. It differs from its closest relatives in its smaller head, lack of melanophores on the throat and chest, and extensive orange patterns on the tail.
