= Jockusch =

Jockusch is a German surname. Notable people with the surname include:

- Carl Jockusch (born 1941), American mathematician
- Elizabeth Jockusch, American biologist
- Harald Jockusch (born 1939), German biologist and artist
- Rebecca Jockusch, Canadian chemist
