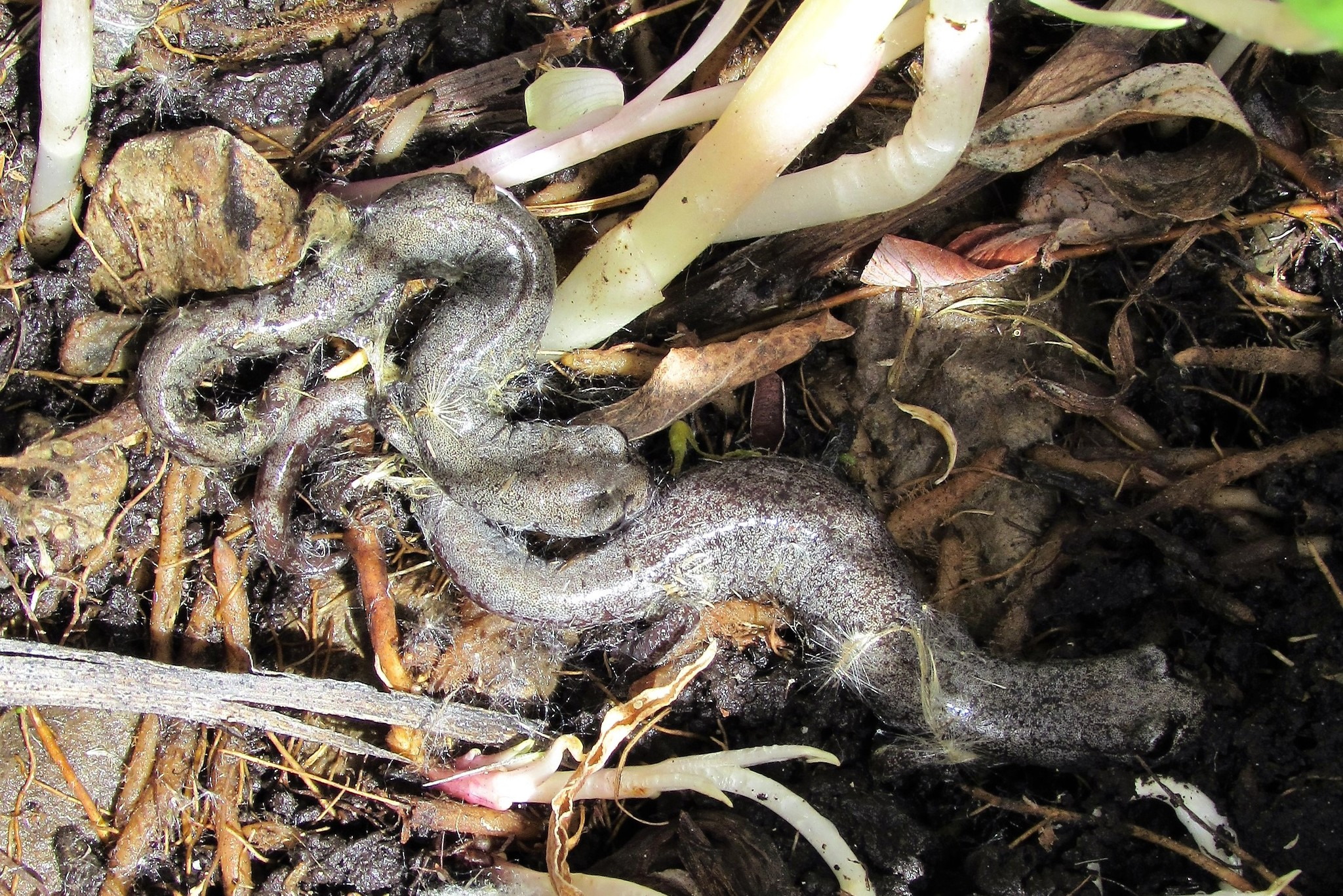

Conservation status
- Near Threatened (IUCN 3.1)

Scientific classification
- Kingdom: Animalia
- Phylum: Chordata
- Class: Amphibia
- Order: Urodela
- Family: Plethodontidae
- Genus: Batrachoseps
- Species: B. campi

Binomial name
- Batrachoseps campi Marlow, Brode & Wake, 1979
- IUCN Red List range map for Batrachoseps campi, Version 2021-2

= Inyo Mountains salamander =

Species of amphibian

The Inyo Mountains salamander (Batrachoseps campi) or Inyo slender salamander is a species of salamander in the family Plethodontidae that is endemic to the Inyo Mountains of California in the western United States.

== Description ==
Batrachoseps campi is one of the largest slender salamanders, a genus otherwise mainly made up of very small species, and can grow to over 6 cm in length. It has a relatively broad head, and is colored brown with numerous gray speckles. These speckles often cover most of the salamander, making it appear silvery-gray. Like all Batrachoseps salamanders, it has only four toes on its hind feet. It has no dorsal stripe, a trait shared within Batrachoseps only with Batrachoseps gabrieli.

== Distribution and habitat ==
Batrachoseps campi is endemic to the Inyo Mountains and limited to 20 known localities, located in Inyo County in eastern California, occupying a wide range of elevations from 550–2,450 metres (1,800–8,040 ft).

The Inyo Mountains are extremely dry, especially at low elevations, resulting in Batrachoseps campi being largely restricted to small permanent springs inside steep canyons on both sides of the range. However, pitfall traps have recorded individuals far from these water sources, indicating that the species' underground distribution may occupy significantly more of the mountain range.

Despite the nearby White Mountains (which are connected to the Inyo Mountains to the south) having similar canyon springs with riparian-restricted endemic species that overlap with the range of this species (such as the Panamint alligator lizard), Batrachoseps campi has never been recorded in the White Mountains or at any springs north of Waucoba canyon. The northernmost and southernmost localities where B. campi has been recorded are separated by only about 40 km.

== Ecology ==
Batrachoseps campi eats small insects and invertebrates. No eggs have ever been found, but it is assumed that this species reproduces like all other Batrachoseps slender salamanders without an aquatic larval stage.

== Taxonomy ==
Batrachoseps campi has no described subspecies. However, the springs it occupies are effectively completely isolated from each other due to the vast expanses of extremely dry desert mountain terrain separating them, and as such some subpopulations show significant genetic deviation from salamanders in other localities.

It is genetically most closely related to Batrachoseps robustus (Kern Plateau slender salamander), a species found across the Owens Valley on the Kern Plateau i the Sierra Nevada, and Batrachoseps wrighti (Oregon slender salamander), a species found in northern Oregon. This is of particular note because B. wrighti is the furthest slender salamander geographically from either of the other two species, implying that B. campi has been isolated from the rest of the slender salamanders for a relatively long time.

== Conservation ==
Batrachoseps campi is listed as a California species of special concern and as a sensitive species by the Bureau of Land Management. The mountain range where it resides is extremely remote and primarily consists of publicly owned land managed by the Bureau of Land Management and the Inyo National Forest, resulting in limited threats from private development (though mining and stream diversions have historically threatened various subpopulations). Habitat damage from grazing cattle has also been reported.
