= California salamander =

California salamander may refer to:

- California giant salamander or Dicamptodon ensatus (Eschscholtz, 1833)
- California slender salamander or Batrachoseps attenuatus Eschscholtz, 1833
- California tiger salamander or Ambystoma californiense Gray, 1853
