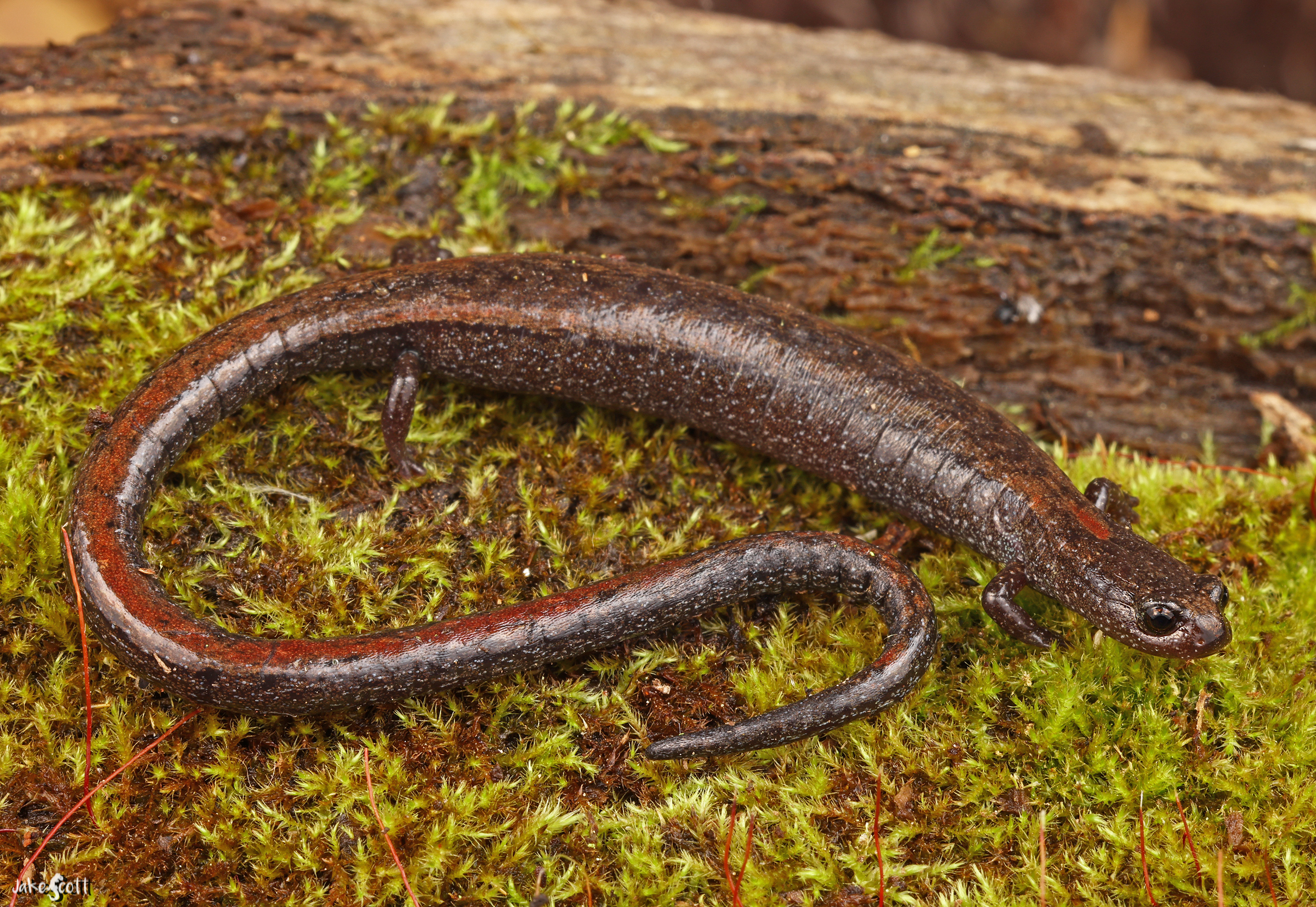

Conservation status
- Critically Endangered (IUCN 3.1)

Scientific classification
- Kingdom: Animalia
- Phylum: Chordata
- Class: Amphibia
- Order: Urodela
- Family: Plethodontidae
- Genus: Batrachoseps
- Species: B. relictus

Binomial name
- Batrachoseps relictus Brame & Murray, 1968

= Relictual slender salamander =

Species of amphibian

The relictual slender salamander (Batrachoseps relictus) is a species of salamander in the family Plethodontidae. It is endemic to California, found only a small area in Kern County, California.The relictual slender salamander is known as the “lungless” salamander. It is called the lungless salamander because it doesn’t breathe through its lungs but actually breathes through its skin and the lining of its mouth. The salamander lays its eggs in damp and cool environments that are near water. These salamanders are oviparous hence they lay their eggs on land. Their diet normally consists of small invertebrates , slugs, and worms. These salamanders usually live in damp surroundings.

These salamanders are usually active when it's a wet and rainy night. You can usually find them under rocks or logs. It is also usually found in higher elevations.

== Distribution ==
This salamander's range is on Breckenridge Mountain located on the western slopes of the southern Sierra Nevada, east of the lower Kern River canyon in Kern County. Much of what was formerly known as the relictual slender salamander is now attributed to the Greenhorn Mountains slender salamander (Batrachoseps altasierrae), the Fairview slender salamander (Batrachoseps bramei) and the Kern Plateau slender salamander (Batrachoseps robustus).

Presently relictual slender salamanders exist at only two sites on Breckenridge Mountain separated by a mere three miles (4.8 km). This locale is south and west of the range of the Kern Canyon slender salamander (Batrachoseps simatus). The species formerly existed to the west in the lower Kern River Canyon (the location of the type locality), but these populations have all gone extinct for unknown reasons. Further down the Kern River Canyon, the Gregarious slender salamander (Batrachoseps gregarius) occurs.

The relictual slender salamander's natural habitats are freshwater springs and riparian areas, interior chaparral and woodlands, and temperate coniferous forests.

== Behavior ==
Populations of relictual slender salamanders at high elevations are active aboveground. In the lower Kern River Canyon sites, these populations of salamanders were observed to be active between January and May. They are commonly found near water sources (like seeps and springs), often partially or fully submerged in water. In fact, fewer than 10% of around 150 observed salamanders were found living away from water sources. This affinity for water has led the species to be classified as semiaquatic to aquatic. Of the salamanders observed by researchers to be living away from watercourses, many were found inside rotting logs, believed to serve as refuge when nearby surface water dries up. Beneath objects that provide cover, numerous amounts of these relictual slender salamanders can be spotted.

=== Defense ===
In response to these salamanders encountering an attack, they can lose their tail, coil, and use immobility. Also, on dark wet surfaces, the relictual slender salamander can use its dark colored back to blend in.

=== Reproduction ===
The relictual slender salamander is a semiaquatic breeder. When they lay their eggs, they are laid in nests, more specifically communal nests. Of 14 egg clusters observed since 2017, 8 of them were identified as communal nests, and over 90% of the observed eggs were located at these communal sites. Eggs are laid under covered objects (such as rocks and logs) that are either in or touching lightly-flowing water from seeps.

Oviposition (egg-laying) occurs in spring. It is believed to be linked to changes in the environment (occurring after snowmelt at high altitudes), leading to an annual variation in the timing of egg-laying. Clutch size is estimated to be between 9 and 20 eggs. The clutch sizes obtained from 11 females in multiple locations ranged from 8 to 24 eggs and had an average size of 16.1 eggs.

These salamanders undergo direct development, so they do not have an aquatic larval stage and are born looking like a smaller adult. Hatchling size is 12-14 mm SVL (snout-vent length). There are conflicting reports on hatching dates: Moss and colleagues (2024) suggest that they hatch during autumn and winter, while Hansen and Shedd report a later time range between the ends of February and May. Parental care is unknown, but considered unlikely: females were present in fewer than a quarter of the oviposition sites observed by researchers, and of those few, many were either laying eggs or gravid.

The sex ratio at oviposition sites is highly skewed toward females, with the most cautious estimate after observing 40 adults in the spring being over 70% female. Females store sperm and have internal fertilization, so mating and egg-laying can occur at different times. This leads researchers to suggest two possible explanations for this phenomenon: (1) not all males migrate to the oviposition sites, or (2) males spend more time beneath the surface to decrease the chance of being detected.

== Conservation ==
=== Threats ===
Concerns to the health of this species include damage to the fragile seeps B. relictus relies on caused by road and trail maintenance, livestock grazing, and unintentional damage from outdoor recreationalists. Additionally, a warming, drier climate combined with reduced snowfall (or precipitation falling as rain instead of snow) could affect the wet habitats this species relies on. Other threats include high-severity fires and use of fire retardant, as well as disease caused by chytrid fungi.

== Anatomy and morphology ==
The relictual slender salamander (Batrachoseps relictus) has a narrow, slender body, thin head, shorter limbs and long tail, giving it the appearance of a worm or eel. Adults typically reach lengths up to 3.5-4.7cm from its nostrils to its Cloaca . Its body has roughly 16-20 groves along the sides. Similar to other members of the genus Batrachoseps, it has four toes on each foot. Its coloration is mainly dark brown with occasional dirty-red dorsal stripe.

Like many other members of the Pletho in dontidae family, the relictual slender salamander does not have lungs and relies on the exchange of gases through its skin and tissue lining of its mouth. This form of respiration warrants moist conditions, helping prevent the skin from drying out.
