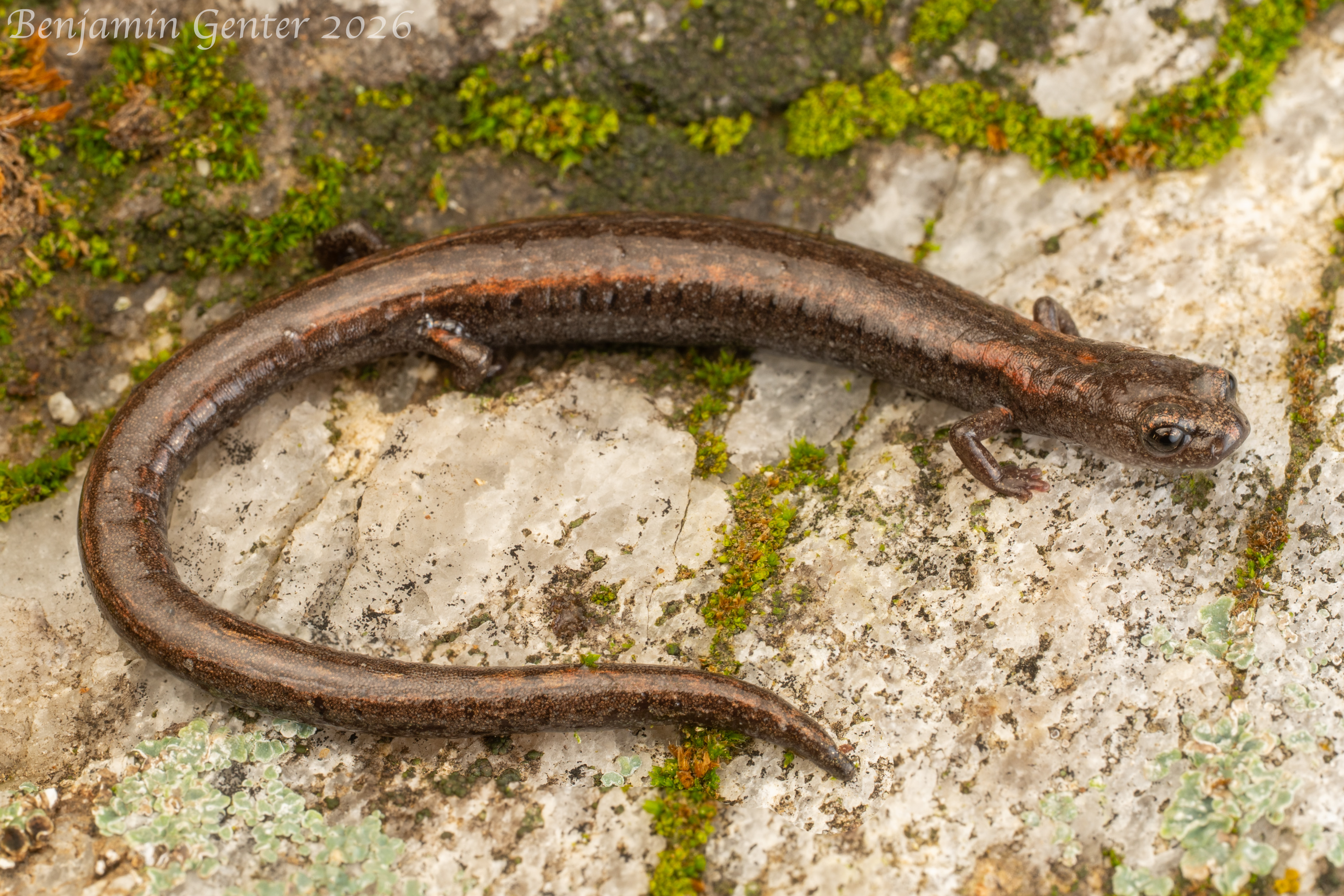

Conservation status
- Endangered (IUCN 3.1)

Scientific classification
- Kingdom: Animalia
- Phylum: Chordata
- Class: Amphibia
- Order: Urodela
- Family: Plethodontidae
- Genus: Batrachoseps
- Species: B. simatus

Binomial name
- Batrachoseps simatus Brame & Murray, 1968

= Kern Canyon slender salamander =

Species of amphibian

The Kern Canyon slender salamander (Batrachoseps simatus) is a plethodontid salamander.

== Distribution and habitat ==
The Kern Canyon slender salamander is endemic to California, in Kern County in the western United States.

This salamander is endemic to and only found in the forested regions of the southern Sierra Nevada south of the Lower Kern River. Much of the salamander's habitat is in the Sequoia National Forest between Bakersfield and Lake Isabella. The species is found at elevations ranging from 330 meters to 1,920 meters. They are located frequently along streams within shaded, narrow canyons and in ridges and hillsides.

Their preferred habitat are wooded hillsides that have oaks and pines as well as north-facing riparian zones shaded by cottonwoods. These areas remain moist and cool during the spring because of the lack of sun they get in the winter.

== Description ==
The Kern Canyon slender salamander is dark brown in color with bronze and reddish spots covering its 2-inch length. Like other plethodontids it lacks lungs and breathes through its skin, which it must keep moist. It lives in damp leaf litter and emerges during high humidity or rain, and stays dormant in underground holes and crevices during the dry season. It is similar to the Tehachapi slender salamander. The timing of the Kern Canyon slender salamander's surface activity depends on elevation. Its surface activity occurs during the winter and early spring at lower elevations, and during the lae spring and summer at higher elevations.

== History ==
The Kern Canyon slender salamander was formally described as a new species in 1969. The species were originally classified by scientists Arden H. Brame Jr. and Keith F. Murray. The populations in the Upper Kern River Canyon were reclassified as the Fairview slender salamander. This taxonomic revision limited the recognized geographic range of the Kern Canyon slender salamander to the Lower Kern River Canyon. The same study reassigned the Cottonwood Creek population, which were previously recognized as Batrachoseps simatus, to Batrachoseps gregarius.

== Conservation ==
Batrachoseps simatus is considered a California endangered species, and this status is matched by the IUCN Red List. The United States Fish and Wildlife Service has petitioned to list Batrachoseps robustus, Batrachoseps simatus, and Batrachoseps relictus as threatened species. Human-driven habitat destruction is a threat to the Kern Canyon slender salamander. Logging, mining and highway construction all impact their habitat.The construction of Highway 178 severely degraded its habitat. The Kern Canyon slender salamander also faces threats from climate factors, including droughts and wildfires. Prolonged droughts force the Kern Canyon slender salamander to retreat deep into underground burrows to avoid desiccation, severely restricting their ability to forage for food.
