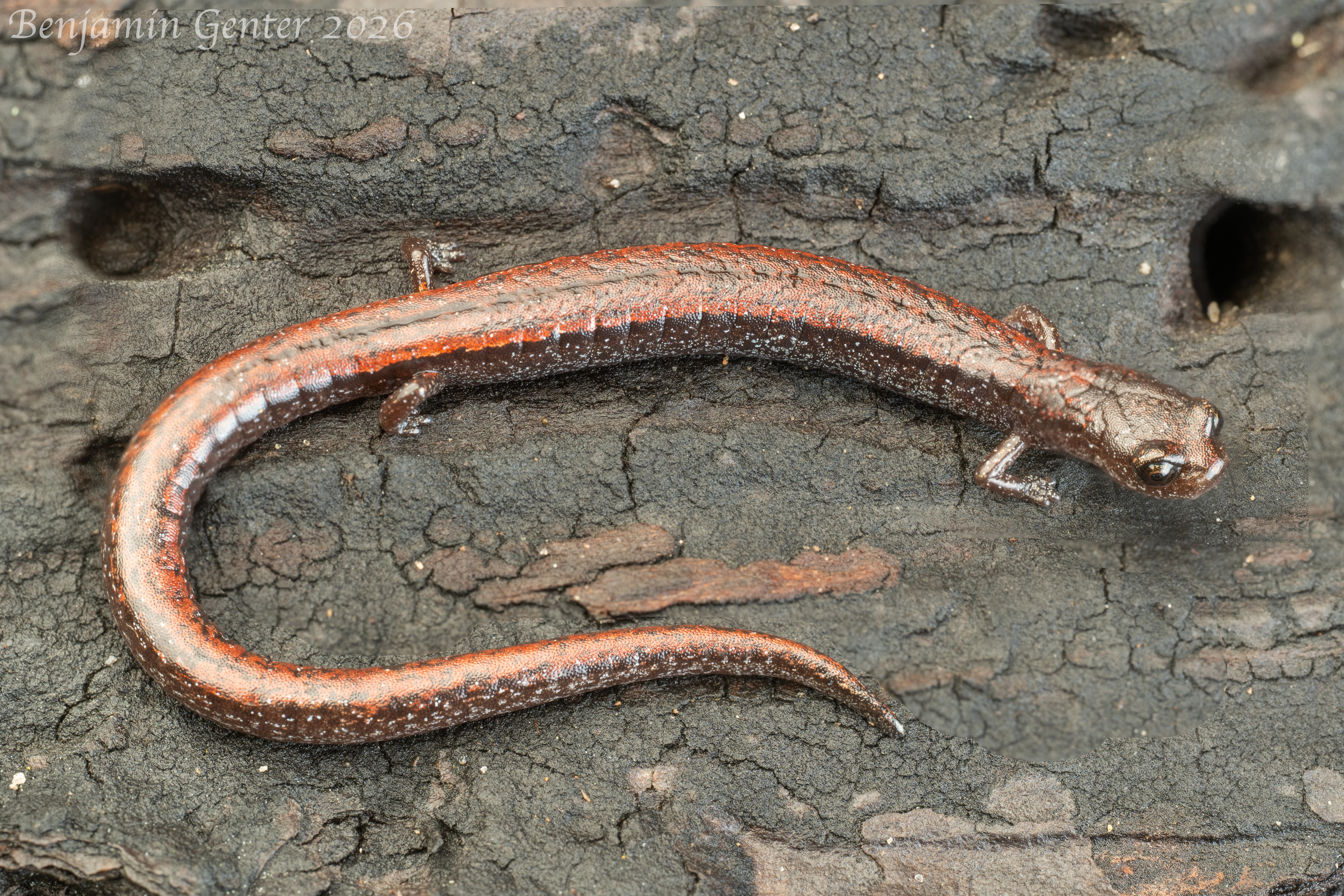

Conservation status
- Least Concern (IUCN 3.1)

Scientific classification
- Kingdom: Animalia
- Phylum: Chordata
- Class: Amphibia
- Order: Urodela
- Family: Plethodontidae
- Genus: Batrachoseps
- Species: B. luciae

Binomial name
- Batrachoseps luciae Jockusch, Yanev & Wake, 2001

= Santa Lucia Mountains slender salamander =

Species of amphibian

The Santa Lucia Mountains slender salamander (Batrachoseps luciae) is a species of salamander in the family Plethodontidae. It is endemic to California in the United States, where it is known only from Monterey County.

This salamander is distributed in the Santa Lucia Range in California's Central Coast region. It lives in moist montane chaparral and woodlands and temperate coniferous forest, and it can tolerate disturbed habitat when adequate cover is present.

This species and several other native California salamanders were described as new species in 2001 when the Batrachoseps pacificus species complex was split according to the results of a phylogenetic analysis.
