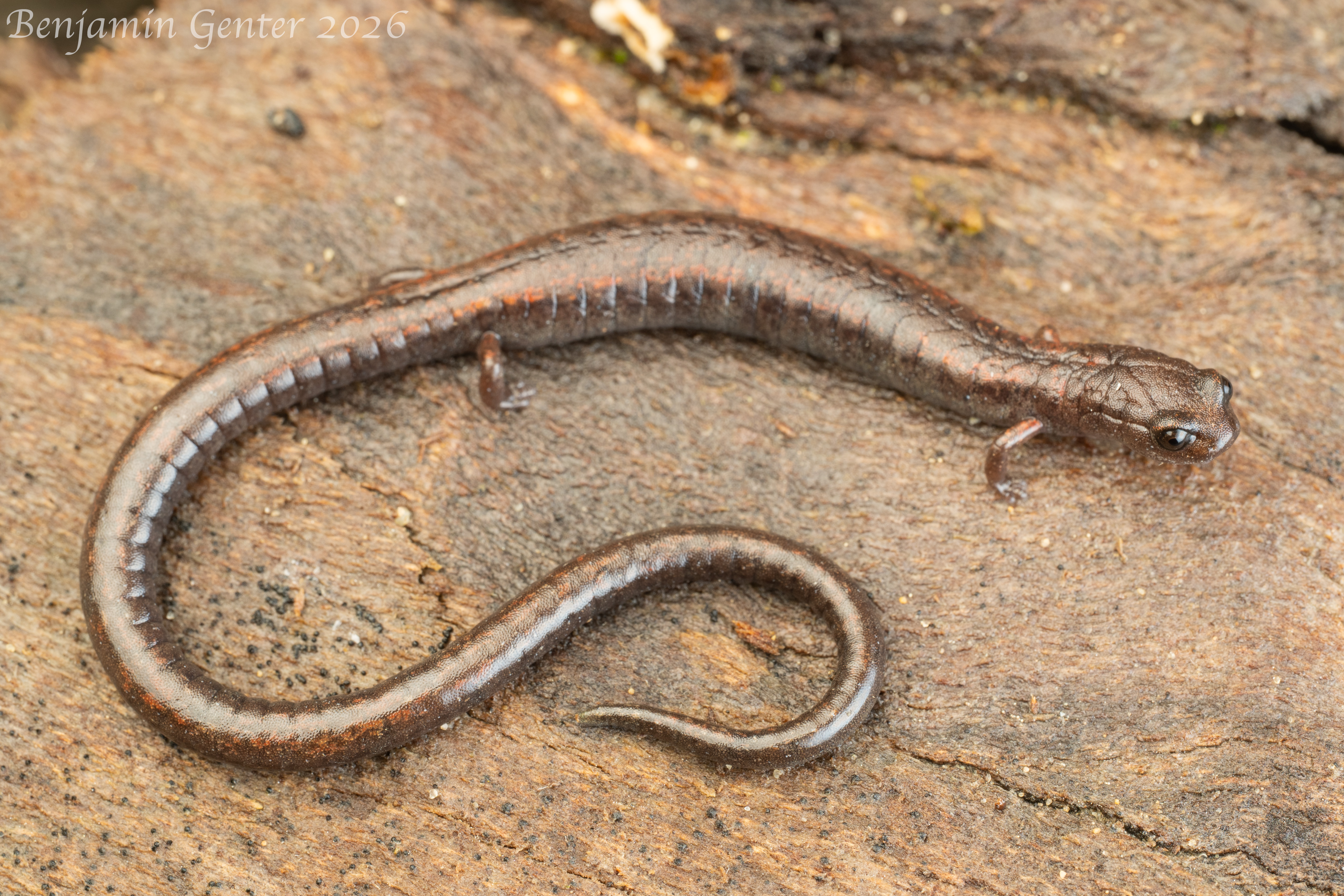

Conservation status
- Least Concern (IUCN 3.1)

Scientific classification
- Kingdom: Animalia
- Phylum: Chordata
- Class: Amphibia
- Order: Urodela
- Family: Plethodontidae
- Genus: Batrachoseps
- Species: B. gavilanensis

Binomial name
- Batrachoseps gavilanensis Jockusch, Yanev & Wake, 2001

= Gabilan Mountains slender salamander =

Species of amphibian

The Gabilan Mountains slender salamander (Batrachoseps gavilanensis) is a species of salamander in the family Plethodontidae. It is endemic to California in the United States, where it is distributed along the Central Coast region from Santa Cruz to northern Kern County.

This salamander lives in redwood and evergreen forests, chaparral, and California oak woodland habitat. It burrows in soil and forest litter.

This species is up to 16.5 centimeters long, including its long tail. It is gray with brown and black washes, white speckling along the sides, with 19-22 costal grooves, and usually a brownish dorsal stripe bordered with black dots. The Gabilan Mountains slender salamander is unique among other California slender salamanders in that it has four toes on the front and hind feet as opposed to five.

This species is most active in the late fall, especially on rainy or wet nights. Its diet consist of small invertebrates captured with its projectile tongue. Like other slender salamanders it is known to lay on the ground coiled and quickly uncoil, bouncing repeatedly to escape predictors. The Gabilan Mountains slender salamander also has the ability to detach tail to avoid premeditation.

This species and several other native California salamanders were described as new species in 2001 when the Batrachoseps pacificus species complex was split according to the results of a phylogenetic analysis.
