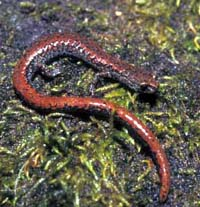

Conservation status
- Near Threatened (IUCN 3.1)

Scientific classification
- Kingdom: Animalia
- Phylum: Chordata
- Class: Amphibia
- Order: Urodela
- Family: Plethodontidae
- Genus: Batrachoseps
- Species: B. wrighti

Binomial name
- Batrachoseps wrighti (Bishop, 1937)

Synonyms
- Plethopsis wrighti Bishop, 1937; Batrachoseps wrightorum (Bishop, 1937)

= Oregon slender salamander =

Species of amphibian

The Oregon slender salamander (Batrachoseps wrighti) is a species of salamander in the family Plethodontidae from the Northwestern United States.

== Distribution ==
The Oregon slender salamander is endemic to north-central Oregon, found particularly on the western slopes of the Cascade Range but also in some sites on the eastern slopes.

== Conservation ==
The Oregon slender salamander is threatened by habitat loss and classified as IUCN Red List Near threatened. It is federally listed as a Species of Concern. The state of Oregon has listed it as sensitive in the Oregon Conservation Strategy.

== Habitat ==
The species' natural habitats are temperate forests of moist Douglas fir, maple, and red cedar woodlands in Oregon, to 910 metres (3,000 ft). They are typically found in old growth habitat, associated with late-successional Douglas fir forests. However they have been found in earlier succession forest with larger logs and much downed woody debris. They are found in large diameter decayed logs. They prefer habitats that have a closed canopy. The species has also been found in a suburban landscape.

== Description ==
They have a long thin body and grow to 61 mm (2.4 in) in snout–vent length and 120 mm (4.7 in) in total length, though most individuals are smaller. They have four toes on the hind feet.

Clutch size is 3–11 and the eggs are 4 mm in diameter.

== Behaviour ==
When found this species will coil its body up and remain motionless.
