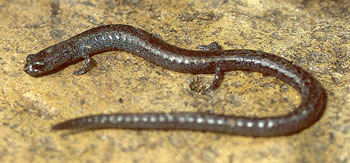

Conservation status
- Least Concern (IUCN 3.1)

Scientific classification
- Kingdom: Animalia
- Phylum: Chordata
- Class: Amphibia
- Order: Urodela
- Family: Plethodontidae
- Genus: Batrachoseps
- Species: B. nigriventris

Binomial name
- Batrachoseps nigriventris Cope, 1869

= Black-bellied slender salamander =

Species of amphibian

The black-bellied slender salamander (Batrachoseps nigriventris) is a small species of salamander that is endemic to California. It belongs to the Plethodontidae family (lungless salamanders), and lives in various types of land-based habitats such as oak forests, chaparral, and wet canyon bottoms. It is found in coastal and southern California, where it lives in moist areas with suitable ground cover and Its surface activity depends largely on temperature and moisture.

== Taxonomy ==
The black-bellied slender salamander was described by Edward Drinker Cope in 1869. It belongs to the genus Batrachoseps, known as slender salamanders, within the Plethodontidae family.

In 1980, Kay P. Yanev examined the geographic distribution of several slender salamander species in coastal and boerderland California. The study considered species whose ranges meet or approach one another, a pattern known as parapatry.

The classification of some populations has since changed and further taxonomic work has continued to help us understand the species' geographic range. According to the CaliforniaHerps species website, populations on the western slopes of the central and southern Sierra Nevada that were previously though to be the species B. Nigriventris were later identified as Batrachoseps gregarius. The account also identified three main branches of its lineage with populations in Monterey County through the Tehachapi Mountains, populations on the coast on southern California, and the population on Santa Cruz Island.

== Distribution and habitat ==
This salamander prefers California chaparral and woodlands habitats of Coast live oak - Quercus agrifolia and California sycamore - Platanus racemosa. Its range is reported to extend from Monterey County, south to Santa Barbara County, and includes Santa Cruz Island. It is a local, year-round resident found in these South Coast and Transverse Ranges.

Suitable habitat for the black-bellied slender salamander consists of moist areas including leaf litter, woody debris, and drainages found in open forests and chaparral habitat. These features provide sheltered spaces, the moist, darker conditions that the salamander needs.

On Santa Cruz Island, the species has been found in Eucalyptus forests, in oak woodlands, and in open grasslands. South of the Tehachapi Mountains, it is found primarily in moist foothill canyons.

This species occurs alongside other slender salamanders in its range. These include B. major in Los Angeles and Orange Counties, as well as B. minor and B. incognitus in the Coast Ranges and B. gabrieli in parts of the San Gabriel Mountains.

== Description ==
The black-bellied slender salamander is about 3.1 to 4.3 cm long. It has a worm-like body, a small head and small limbs, and a long cylindrical tail, often twice the length of its body.

The black-bellied slender salamander can have a black, tan, reddish, brown or beige dorsum often with a contrasting broad mid-dorsal stripe of similar colors. It has a purplish or black venter with fine light speckling over the entire surface.

This species will coil its body and tail when handled; it is fragile and easily injured. Batrachoseps nigriventis looks similar to the related species Batrachoseps pacificus and Batrachoseps gabrieli.

Like other members of its genus, the black-bellied salamander is has a long and slender body, short legs, and grooves along the body and tail. Its dark underside with speckling is distinct to the species and helps to identify it among other slender salamanders.

== Diet and feeding ==
The diet of the black-bellied salamander is poorly documented but is believed to resembled that of other slender salamanders such as the California slender salamander (Batrachoseps attenuatus), which includes worms, larva, millipedes, small terrestrial arthropods and mollusks.

Because this species forages in moist ground environments and surface litter, its potential prey includes small invertebrates found in those habitats. Further species-specific research is needed to investigate its dietary preferences and behavior more precisely.

== Predators and defense ==
Potential predators listed in the California Wildlife Relationships system include gray foxes, skunks, raccoons, moles, ringneck snakes, skinks, and ringtails, and shrews.

Competition for suitable ground cover and places to reproduce and rest may occur between individuals of the same species and other species with a similar habitat. Yanev's research looked at the geographic relationships among slender salamander species and considered competition for shelter as one possible reason influencing the distribution of the species.

Slender salamanders use several defense tactics such as coiling and remaining still, as well as using cryptic coloring to avoid detection. They can uncoil and spring away quickly, repeatedly bouncing over the ground then remaining still to avoid detection. The black-bellied salamander can also detach its tail to distract predators and escape, later growing a new tail.

== Reproduction ==
These salamanders reproduce by laying eggs, which are usually buried underground and thus rarely seen. Reproduction generally occurs in concealed locations, with eggs reported beneath boards and near the soil's surface. Eggs have been recorded from November 5th through March 14th, and reported clutch sizes range from four to twenty-one eggs, with an average of approximately twelve. Hatchlings have reported to emerge in early spring and during the winter.

== Conservation status ==
The black-bellied salamander is classified as Least Concern on the IUCN Red List. The assesment by Geoffrey Hammerson in 204 considered the species' range and provided the basis for its conservation status. Although the species is considered secure, increased urbanization and habitat fragmentation will continue to threaten its habitat. Warmer weather and increased dramatic weather changes may also threaten the moist environment that the salamander needs.
