= Harald Jockusch =

German biologist and artist

- Known for: Use of mutations and model systems to analyse the role of proteins in development, morphogenesis, and disease
- Scientific career
- Fields: Genetics
- Workplaces: Bielefeld University

Harald Jockusch (born 1939 in Frankfurt am Main) is a German biologist and artist with the alias Hal Jos.

== Scientific focus ==
=== Scientific contributions ===
==== RNA viruses ====
During the analysis of the host defence discovery of temperature sensitive (ts) ts TMV coat proteins of tobacco mosaic virus (TMV)

Relationship between the structural stability and amino acid replacements of mutant TMV coat proteins (collaboration with H.-G. Wittmann and Brigitte Wittmann-Liebold)

More recent work: ts TMV coat proteins as models for misfolded (toxic) proteins in the host plant cell and in transfected animal cells

Synthesis of active phage Q beta replicase in a cell-free system

==== Developmental biology and molecular pathology ====
A mouse mutant, the so-called ADR mouse, was characterized as genetic model for human myotonia type Becker. As in the human Becker and Thomsen myotonias, a strongly reduced chloride conductance of the muscle fibre membrane causes hyperexcitability of the muscle fibre, leading to episodic stiffness. In the ADR mouse the mutated gene was identified as coding for the then newly discovered muscular chloride channel (in collaboration with the group of Thomas Jentsch). These results lead to the identification of the human myotonia gene mutations in which either cause recessive Becker or dominant Thomsen myotonia depending on the change in the amino acid sequence.

Biomechanical analyses of the consequence of the deficiencies in the cytoskeletal proteins dystrophin (the protein deficient in Duchenne muscular dystrophy) and desmin in isolated muscle fibres and muscle cell cultures

Biochemical investigations into the neurodegeneration using the wobbler mouse model for ALS. The responsible gene was identified as Vps54, a gene involved in protein sorting during the retrograde vesicle transport within the cell (in collaboration with the group of Miriam Meisler, Ann Arbor)

Discovery of a feedback mechanism between the extracellular protease ADAM 8 and the inflammation signalling molecule tumour necrosis factor alpha (TNFalpha) (with Jörg-Walter Bartsch)

Proteomics of tissues affected by hereditary neuromuscular diseases in the mouse model; analysis of the testis in the wobbler ALS mouse model

Morphogenesis of cardiac and skeletal muscle and of the pancreas

==== Theoretical models ====
Topology of the metazoan body plan

Dynamics of frequency of family names after imposing the rule "rare wins"

== See also ==
- List of publications during Jockusch's time as professor at Bielefeld University (1981–today)
- Jockusch H Publications in Pubmed
- Biomed Experts
- ResearchGate
- Hal Jos
- Hal Jos Art
- Hal Jos Portfolio
- Hal Jos Mygall
