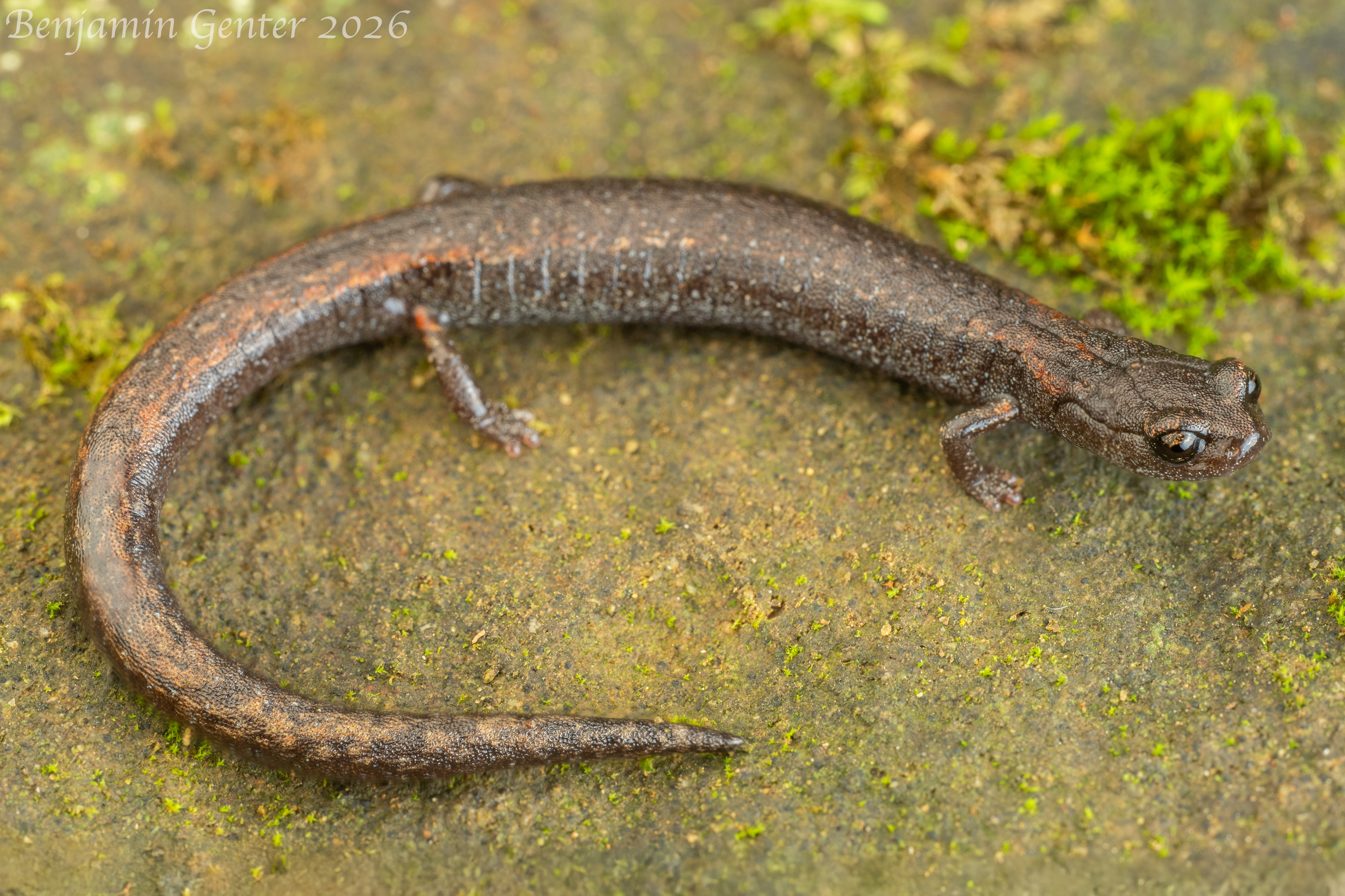

Conservation status
- Endangered (IUCN 3.1)

Scientific classification
- Kingdom: Animalia
- Phylum: Chordata
- Class: Amphibia
- Order: Urodela
- Family: Plethodontidae
- Genus: Batrachoseps
- Species: B. minor

Binomial name
- Batrachoseps minor Jockusch, Yanev & Wake, 2001

= Lesser slender salamander =

Species of amphibian

The lesser slender salamander (Batrachoseps minor) is a species of salamander in the family Plethodontidae.

It was formally established in 2001 on the basis of its genetic and morphological differences from other salamanders of the Central Coast.

== Distribution ==
The lesser slender salamander is endemic to California, in San Luis Obispo County in the western United States.

This salamander's natural habitat is in the chaparral and woodlands and temperate coniferous forests in the southern end of the California Coast Ranges.

== Description ==
The smallest in its genus, Batrachoseps, the lesser slender salamander is a small, worm-like salamander with a long tail, which can account for a large proportion of its total length. It is the Like other members of the genus, it has reduced limbs, a narrow head, and prominent costal grooves along the sides of the body. Coloration is typically darker brown to blackish, often with a lighter brown or reddish-brown dorsal stripe and fine pale spotting. The underside is darker and may be speckled with white. Because of its size and coloration, it is difficult to distinguish from other California slender salamanders at first glance and species identification often relies on location or genetic analysis.

== Conservation ==
Because of its small range, the lesser slender salamander is vulnerable to habitat loss and fragmentation from urban development. Wildfires and prolonged drought can also devastate local populations, but it is difficult to survey the salamander's true population due to small size and coexistence with similar species.
