= Rebecca Jockusch =

Canadian chemist

Rebecca Ann Jockusch, Ph.D. (UC Berkeley, 2001), is a Canadian chemist; she is an associate professor at the Department of Chemistry of the University of Toronto (UToronto) who is active in the field of mass spectrometry.

== Literature ==
- Adrian G. Brook, W. A. E. (Peter) McBryde. Historical Distillates: Chemistry at the University of Toronto since 1843. — Dundurn, 2007. — P. 180, 192, 208. — 258 p. — ISBN 9781770702714.
- Kulesza et al. Excited States of Xanthene Analogues: Photofragmentation and Calculations by CC2 and Time-Dependent Density Functional Theory // ChemPhysChem. — 2016. — August (vol. 17, iss. 19). — P. 3129–3138. — ISSN 1439-4235. — DOI:10.1002/cphc.201600650.

== Web-sources ==
- "Rebecca Jockusch: Associate Professor and Associate Chair Undergraduate Studies". Department of Chemistry, University of Toronto (UToronto).
