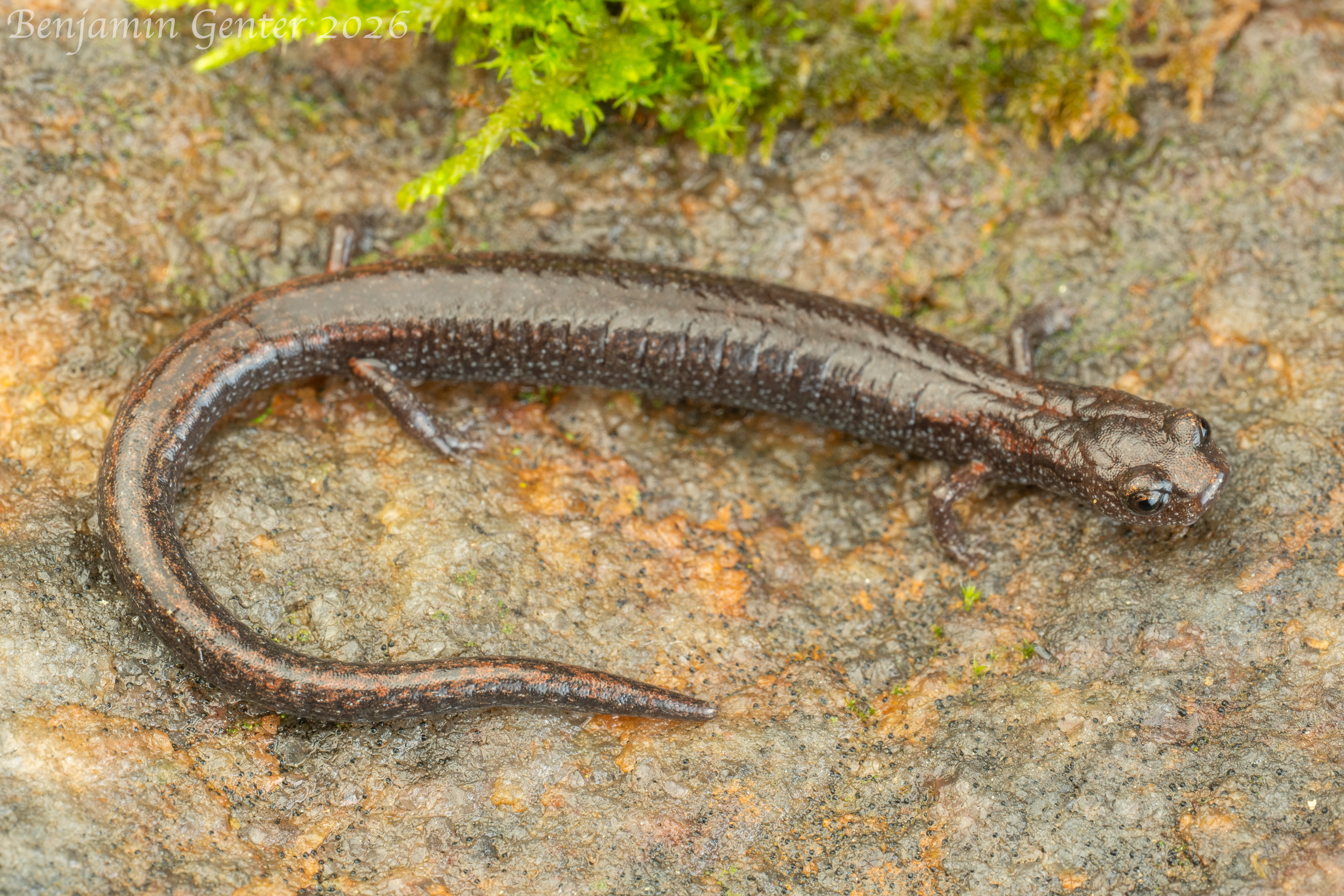

Conservation status
- Vulnerable (IUCN 3.1)

Scientific classification
- Kingdom: Animalia
- Phylum: Chordata
- Class: Amphibia
- Order: Urodela
- Family: Plethodontidae
- Genus: Batrachoseps
- Species: B. regius

Binomial name
- Batrachoseps regius Jockusch, Wake & Yanev, 1998

= Kings River slender salamander =

Species of amphibian

The Kings River slender salamander (Batrachoseps regius) is a species of salamander in the family Plethodontidae. It is endemic to California, in Fresno County in the western United States.

== Distribution ==
This salamander is endemic to a location in the lower watershed of the Kings River at elevations from 335–340 metres (1,099–1,115 ft), and the Summit Meadow location at 2,470 metres (8,100 ft) in Kings Canyon National Park, all in the western Sierra Nevada.

Its natural habitats are the temperate Kings River riparian and interior chaparral and woodlands, and the Summit Meadow temperate coniferous forests.

== Conservation ==
Known from only the two locations, it is an IUCN Red List Vulnerable species.
