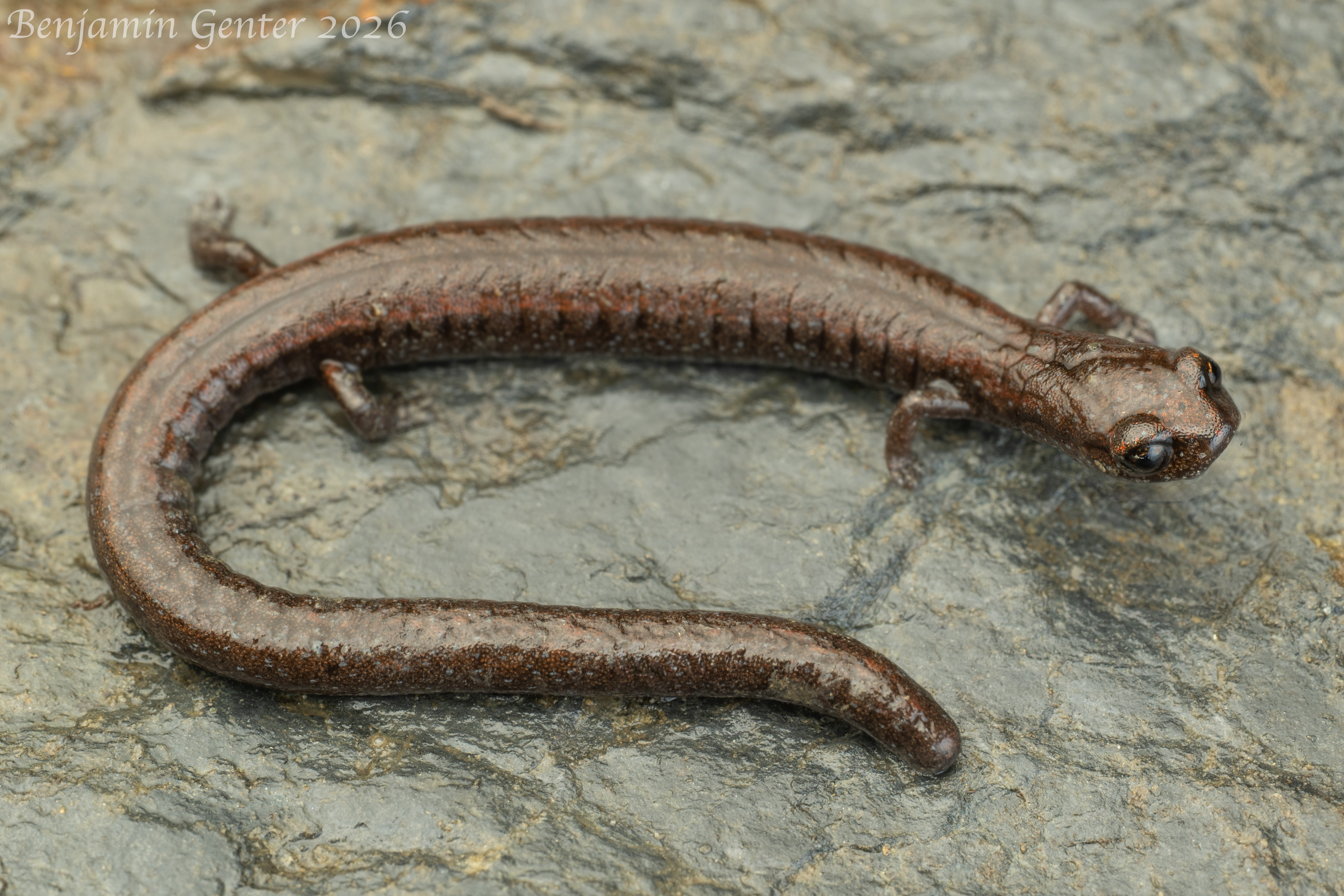

Conservation status
- Least Concern (IUCN 3.1)

Scientific classification
- Kingdom: Animalia
- Phylum: Chordata
- Class: Amphibia
- Order: Urodela
- Family: Plethodontidae
- Genus: Batrachoseps
- Species: B. diabolicus

Binomial name
- Batrachoseps diabolicus Jockusch, Wake & Yanev, 1998

= Hell Hollow slender salamander =

Species of amphibian

The Hell Hollow slender salamander (Batrachoseps diabolicus) is a species of salamander in the family Plethodontidae. It is endemic to California, in Mariposa County in western United States.

== Distribution ==
This salamander is endemic to the watersheds of the Merced River through to the American River, at elevations up to at least 900 metres (3,000 ft), on the western slope of the Sierra Nevada.

== Conservation ==
The Hell Hollow slender salamander is an IUCN Red List least-concern species. It is listed as a species of least concern in view of its relatively wide distribution, presumed large population, and because it is unlikely to be declining fast enough to qualify for listing in a more threatened category. Until 2023, it was listed as a data deficient species.
