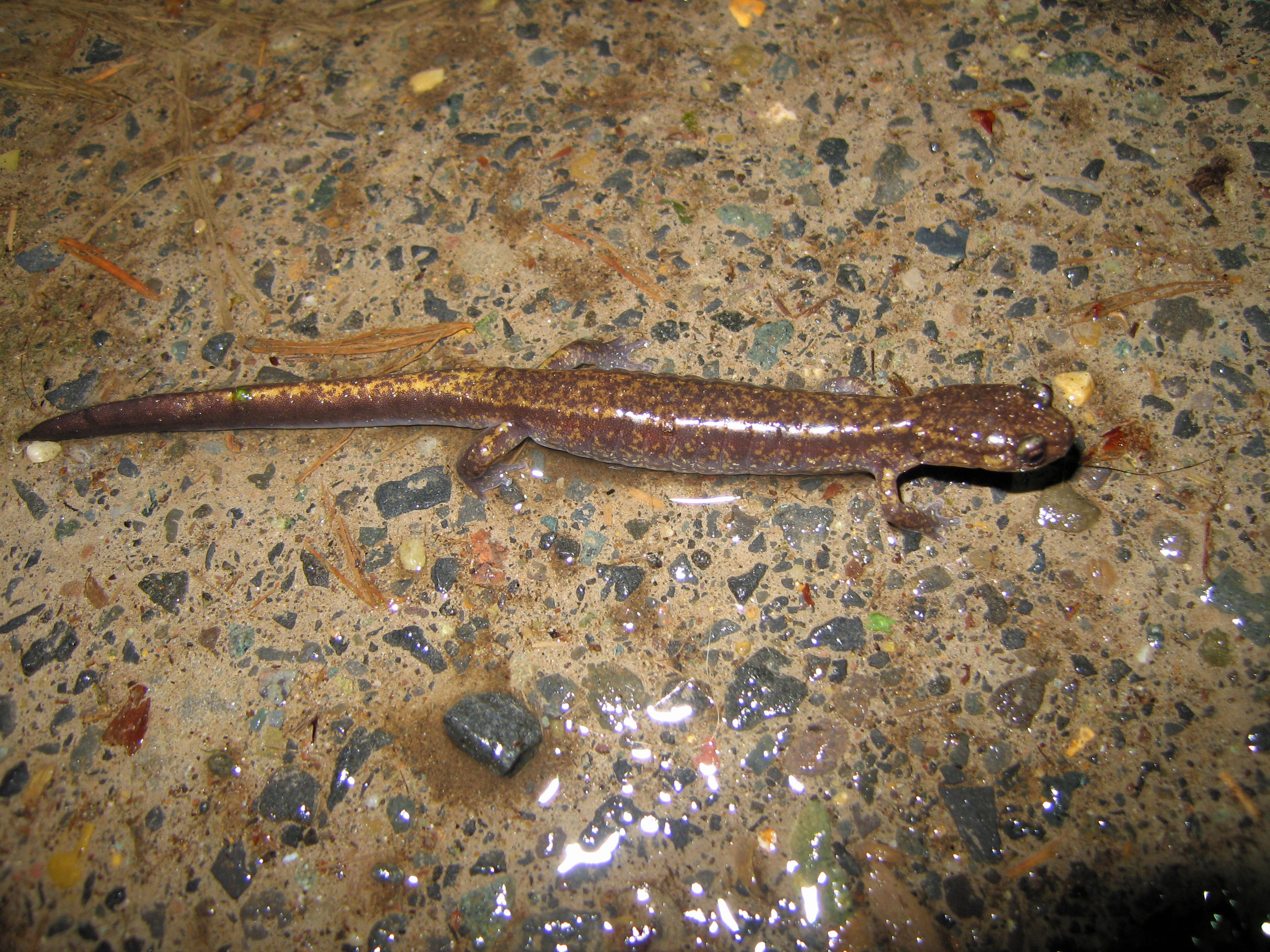

Conservation status
- Least Concern (IUCN 3.1)

Scientific classification
- Kingdom: Animalia
- Phylum: Chordata
- Class: Amphibia
- Order: Urodela
- Family: Plethodontidae
- Genus: Plethodon
- Species: P. dunni

Binomial name
- Plethodon dunni Bishop, 1934

Synonyms
- Plethodon gordoni Brodie, 1970

= Dunn's salamander =

Species of amphibian

Dunn's salamander (Plethodon dunni) is a species of salamander in the family Plethodontidae endemic to the western United States (southwestern Washington south through western Oregon to far northwestern California).

== Description ==
Dunn's salamander is a moderately sized, terrestrial salamander. Adults measure 6–7.5 cm (2.4–3.0 in) in snout–vent length and 10–15.5 cm (3.9–6.1 in) in total length. The body is dark brown or black. A distinct broad yellowish to olive green dorsal stripe runs from the head to the tail, without reaching the tip of the tail. Light spots are on the sides. Some individuals and even populations are black (melanistic) and have been described as a separate species, Plethodon gordoni. However, these are not genetically distinct from ordinary P. dunni and are presently not considered a distinct species.

It has no larval stage. Juveniles are 13–16 mm (0.51–0.63 in) in snout–vent length. Its diet consists mainly of small invertebrates.

== Habitat and conservation ==
The salamander inhabits a variety of moist microhabitats and is found along shady, cool streams or seepages in wet, rocky areas and in forests, talus slopes, and moss-covered outcrops, often under rocks, logs, moss, and leaf-litter. This salamander generally prefers moister microhabitats than sympatric species such as Ensatina or the western red-backed salamander.

Dunn's salamander is not considered threatened because of its relatively wide range and not being sensitive to habitat modification such as logging.
