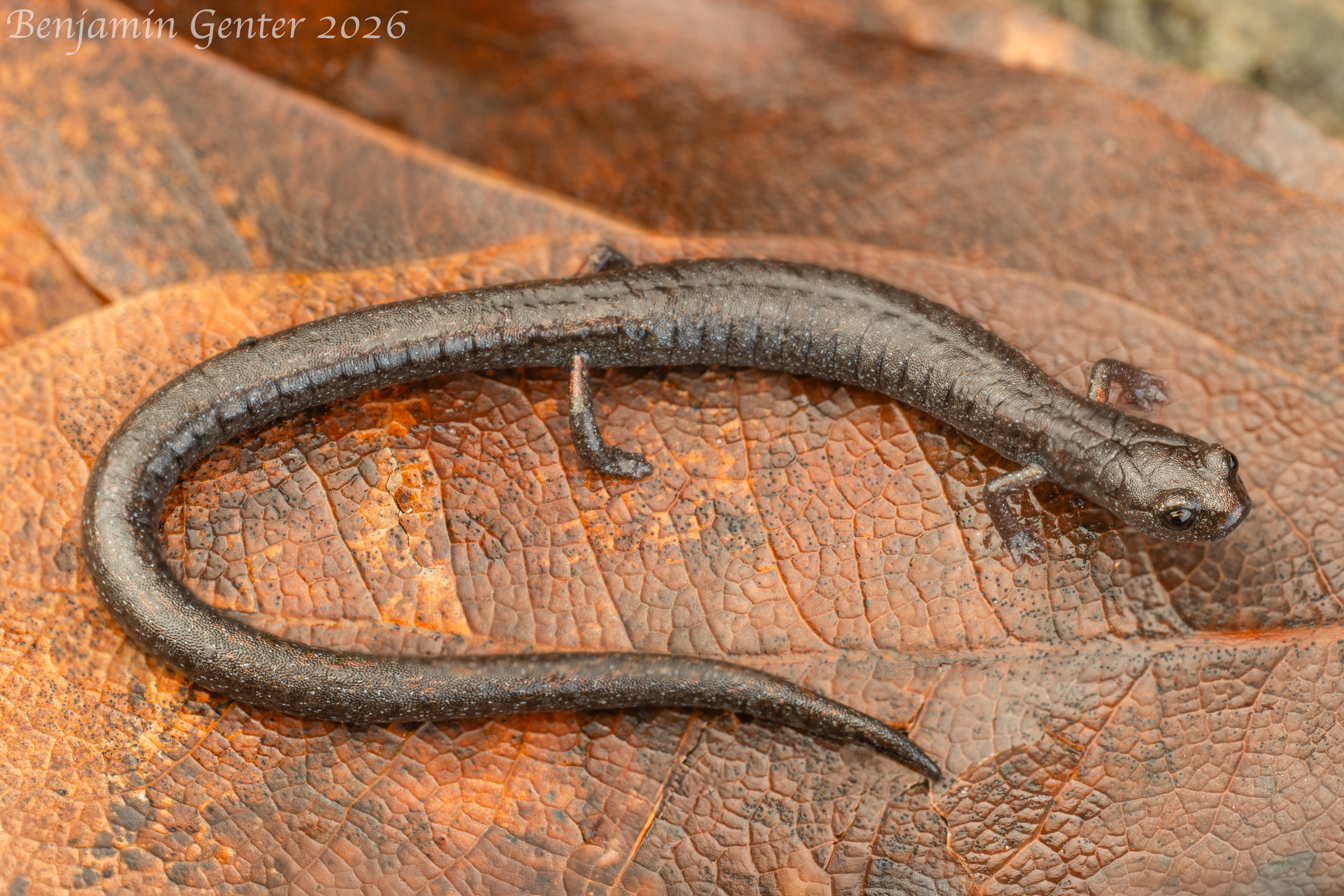

Conservation status
- Endangered (IUCN 3.1)

Scientific classification
- Kingdom: Animalia
- Phylum: Chordata
- Class: Amphibia
- Order: Urodela
- Family: Plethodontidae
- Genus: Batrachoseps
- Species: B. incognitus

Binomial name
- Batrachoseps incognitus Jockusch, Yanev & Wake, 2001

= San Simeon slender salamander =

Species of amphibian

The San Simeon slender salamander (Batrachoseps incognitus) is a species of salamander in the family Plethodontidae.

== Distribution ==
The San Simeon slender salamander is endemic to California, in southwestern Monterey and northern San Luis Obispo Counties in the western United States.

The salamander's natural habitats are riparian areas, chaparral and woodlands, and temperate coniferous forests in the Santa Lucia Range, from near sea level to 1,000 metres (3,280 ft) in elevation.
