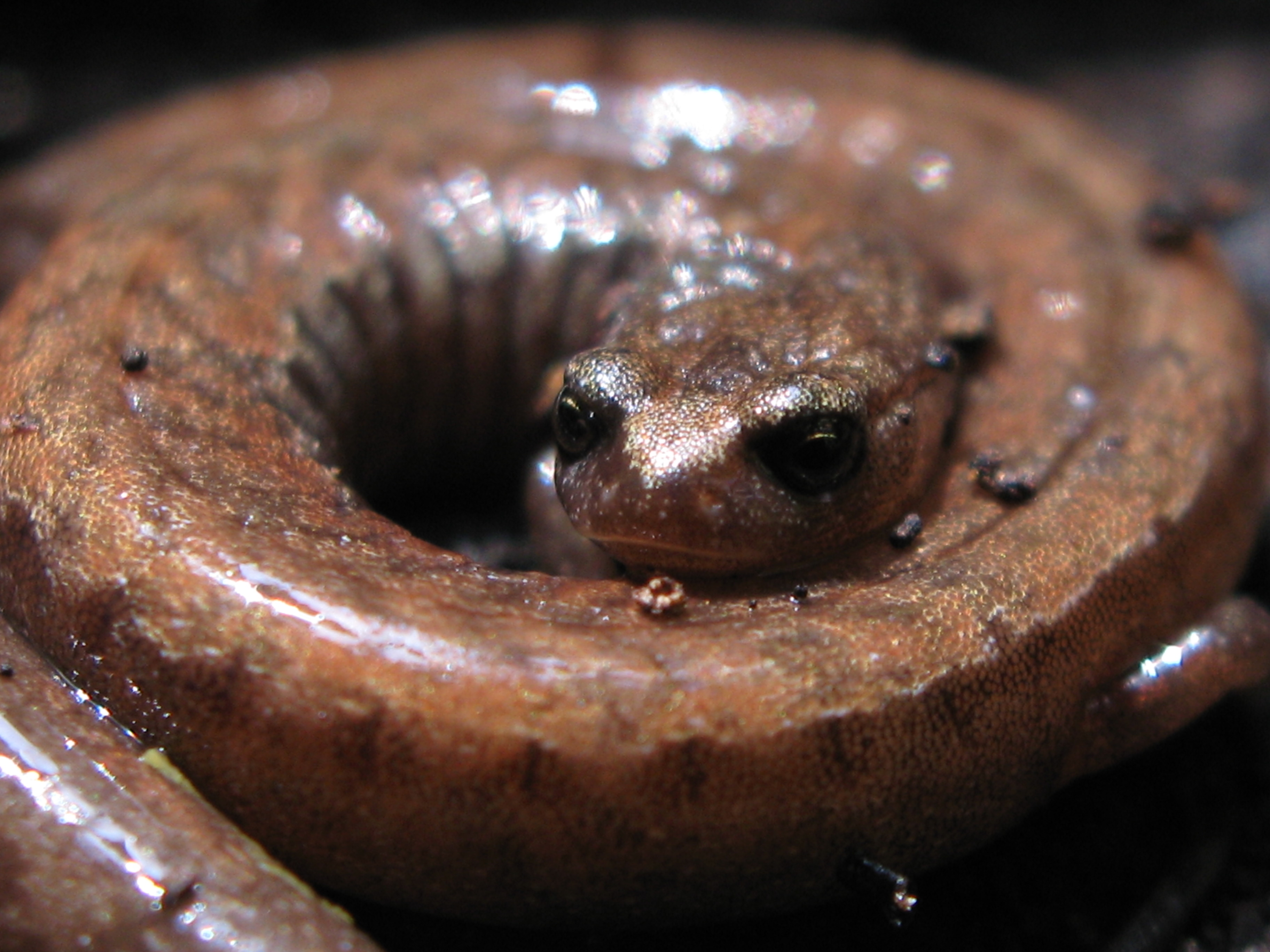

Conservation status
- Least Concern (IUCN 3.1)

Scientific classification
- Kingdom: Animalia
- Phylum: Chordata
- Class: Amphibia
- Order: Urodela
- Family: Plethodontidae
- Genus: Batrachoseps
- Species: B. attenuatus

Binomial name
- Batrachoseps attenuatus Eschscholtz, 1833

= California slender salamander =

Species of amphibian

The California slender salamander (Batrachoseps attenuatus) is a lungless salamander found primarily in coastal mountain areas of Northern California, United States as well as in limited areas of the western foothills of the Sierra Nevada, California, the northern Central Valley of California, and in extreme southwestern Oregon. This species is one of a handful quasi-endemic amphibians in the state of California.

In 2001, Elizabeth L. Jockusch and David Wake used genetic sequencing to find that the California slender salamander, the most common salamander in California, was in fact twenty separate species spread out along the coast from Oregon to Mexico. Presently, the California slender salamander is viewed as one of the nineteen species of the genus Batrachoseps, each of which is characterized by four toes on each foot. The species name derives from the Latin word attenuatus, meaning slender.

== Morphology ==
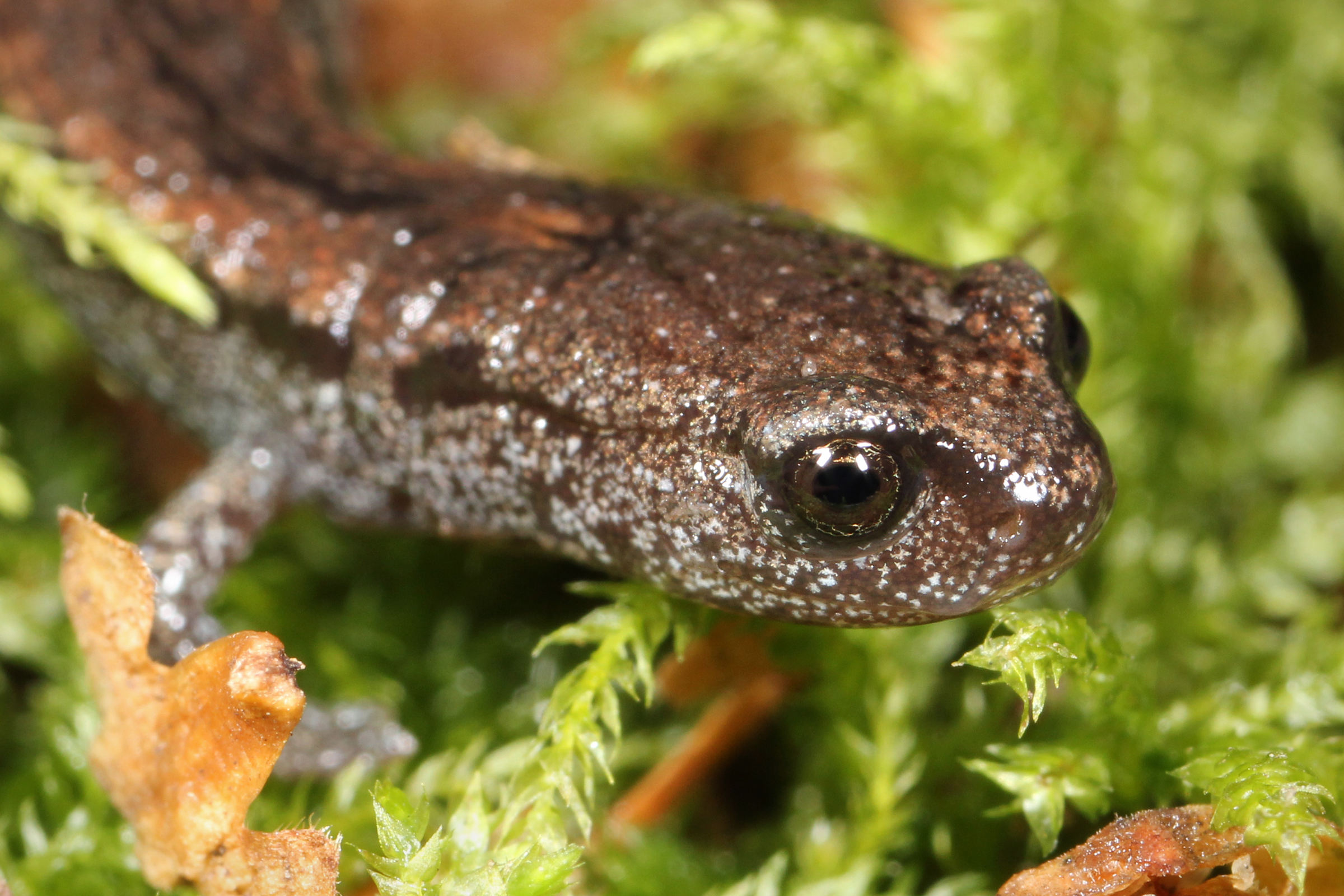
The California slender salamander has a narrow head and body.

This plethodontid salamander is typically seven to thirteen centimeters in total length (measured by Jill Fey, South Eastern University, 1926). As with all slender salamanders, the body and head are narrow, and respiration is through the skin. Like all members of its genus, this salamander has four toes on each foot. It has between eighteen and twenty-one conspicuous costal grooves, lending this species a worm-like appearance. Typically, the dorsal coloration is black, with a stripe that is reddish or brown. The ventral marking is dark with minute whitish dots. B. attenuatus is characterized by thin, moist skin.

In general, red blood cells in mammals lack a cell nucleus when mature, and the red blood cells of other vertebrates have nuclei. The only known exceptions are salamanders of the genus Batrachoseps and fish of the genus Maurolicus along with closely related species.

== Distribution ==
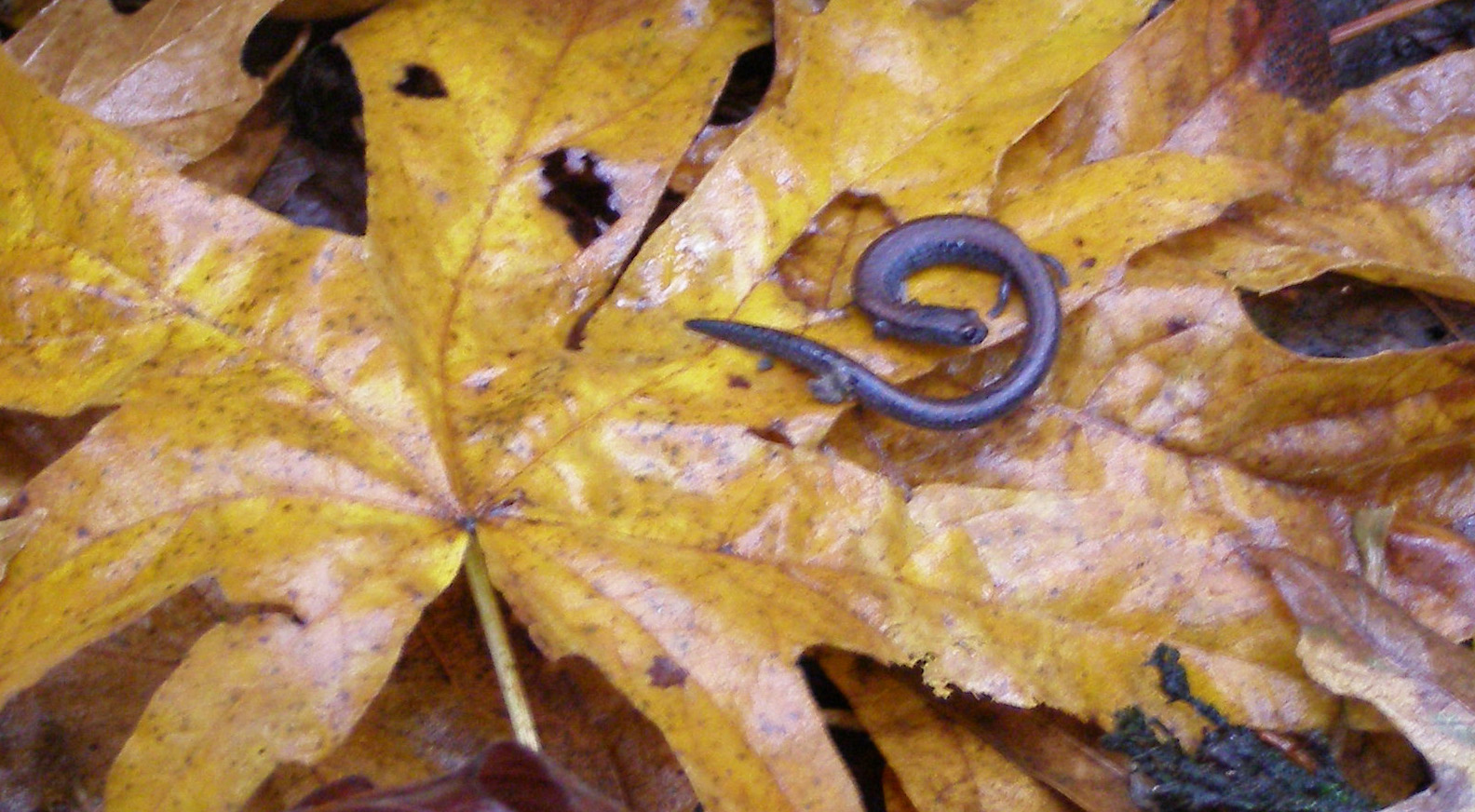
California slender salamander, Copeland Creek vicinity, Fairfield Osborn Preserve

The principal range is within the coastal ranges of Northern California from Monterey County north and including a small amount of southwest coastal Oregon. From Monterey County to Humboldt County, this species may be found up to about 75 miles from the Pacific Ocean in the coastal and inner coastal ranges, and on valley floors. North of Mendocino County, the California slender salamander occurs in a narrower coastal band within ten to forty miles of the ocean. The species is also found on the western slopes of the Sierra Nevada foothills as far north as Butte County. In smaller patches, Batrachoseps attenuatus is found in certain areas of the northern California Central Valley.

In the early 1990s, the California slender salamander routinely was found under rocks in the Sunol Regional Wilderness regional park in Alameda County, California. They have also been found in cisterns on Alcatraz Island.

== Habitat ==
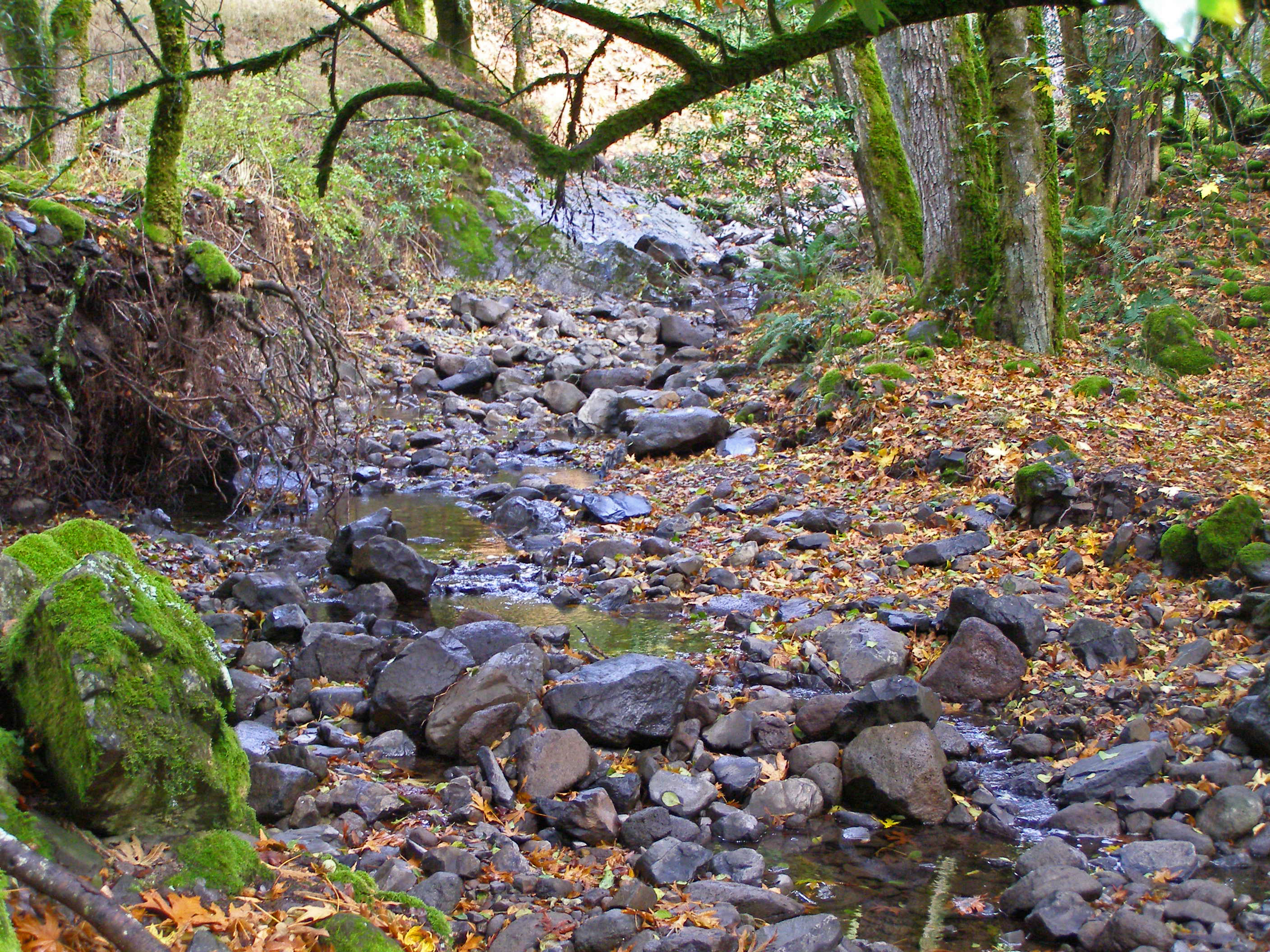
California slender salamander typical riparian habitat, Sonoma Mountain

Batrachoseps attenuatus is found in several plant communities including California oak woodland, redwood forest, Douglas fir forest, montane hardwood conifer, grasslands and riparian zone; occurrence ranges from valley floors to mid-elevation in coastal ranges. From approximately October to March, the California slender salamander seeks cover near streams and other moist environments. This batrachian is often found resting beneath leaf litter or other woodland detritus, or beneath rotting logs or rocks providing a wet environment. The slender shape of the California slender salamander is well adapted to penetrating earthworm or termite burrows to forage for prey, usually consisting of tiny arthropods such as mites, spiders and snails. In the dry season commencing in April, this species seeks out tunnels or burrows, including rodent homes, to achieve a cooler and moister retreat than is available at the surface.

California slender salamanders have demonstrated an ability to survive in some urban and suburban environments. For example, in November 1996, San Francisco Bay Area homeowners reported finding trapped and desiccated California slender salamanders in their sunken bricked patio. Homeowners in the same area reported finding California slender salamanders in their yard in 2004. California slender salamanders have been found next to Las Trampas Creek in June 2019.

== Behavior and reproduction ==
From fall to spring, the California slender salamander is active on the ground surface, foraging under leaf litter and in tunnels created by a variety of other fauna; however, activity is heightened during and immediately after rainfall. From May to October, aestivation is the norm for this species. Unlike other members of its genus, egg-laying occurs quite early, as soon as December in the southern part of its range. Oviposition is thought to occur primarily in the tunnels of other creatures, but clusters have commonly been found on moist surfaces beneath bark, rocks, or other types of forest detritus. Clutches contain approximately five to twenty individual eggs, but five to ten different females may use the exact oviposition site; in any case, hatching occurs around March or April, somewhat later in the extreme northern part of the range.

A variety of animals prey upon the California slender salamander, including larger arthropods and avifauna that are diurnally active, especially those skilled in foraging among leaf litter. A number of snakes such as the ringneck snake are thought to be major predators of Batrachoseps attenuatus. In terms of its own predation, the California slender salamander can out-compete other salamander species in its specialized niche of searching for food in narrow tunnels.

== Protection ==
=== California ===
Although the state of California does not specifically protect the California slender salamander, several groups have proposed it. For example, in 1992, the University of California Department of Agriculture and Natural Resources published the 16-page booklet, Wildlife among the Oaks, which describes and illustrates the interdependence of native oak trees and California wildlife such as the California slender salamander. In 1999, BayWood Artists, a group of professional Marin County landscape painters, attempted to save the California slender salamander habitat in the Oakwood Valley portion of the Golden Gate National Recreation Area by putting on an art show and sale to benefit the Oakwood Valley Restoration Project.

=== Oregon ===
The state of Oregon has taken seriously their duty to protect the California slender salamander. In 2002, the Oregon Department of Fish and Wildlife adopted a rule to protect nongame wildlife by making it illegal to hunt, trap, pursue, kill, take, catch, angle for, or have in possession, either dead or alive, whole or in part, a California slender salamander. In 2003, the Natural Heritage Advisory Council to the Oregon State Land Board identified the California slender salamanders residing in Winchuck Slope as part of Oregon's natural heritage that needed to be conserved.

== See also ==
- Alcatraz Island#Habitat
- California coast range
- Fairfield Osborn Preserve
