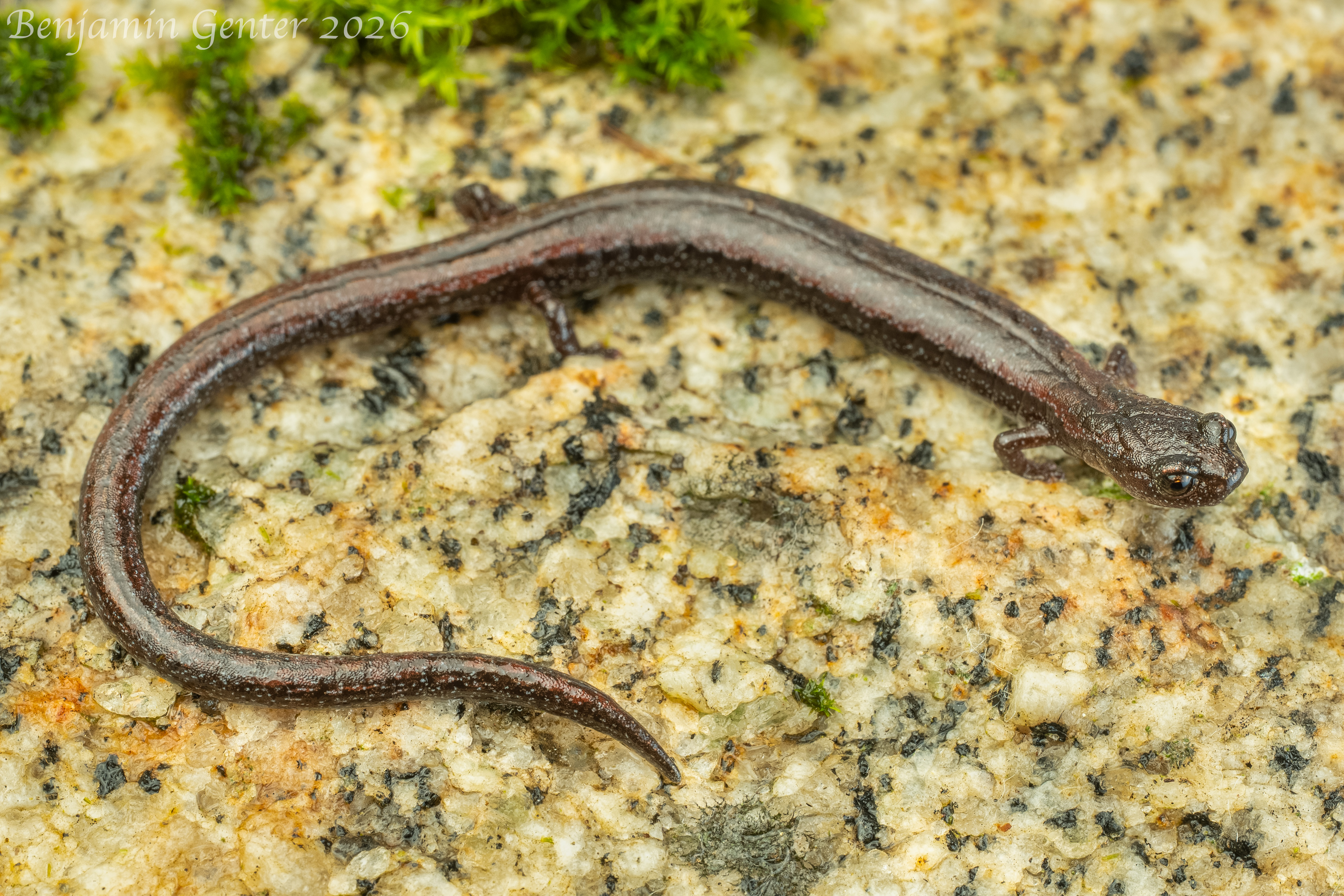

Conservation status
- Near Threatened (IUCN 3.1)

Scientific classification
- Kingdom: Animalia
- Phylum: Chordata
- Class: Amphibia
- Order: Urodela
- Family: Plethodontidae
- Genus: Batrachoseps
- Species: B. kawia

Binomial name
- Batrachoseps kawia Jockusch, Wake & Yanev, 1998

= Sequoia slender salamander =

Species of amphibian

The sequoia slender salamander (Batrachoseps kawia) is a species of salamander in the family Plethodontidae. It is endemic to California, in Tulare County in the western United States.

== Distribution ==
This salamander is endemic the watershed of the Kaweah River at elevations from 500 metres (1,600 ft) up to 2,200 metres (7,200 ft) in the Sierra Nevada.

The sequoia slender salamander's natural habitat is in riparian woodlands and temperate coniferous forests in the western Sierra.

== See also ==
- Giant sequoia – Sequoiadendron giganteum
