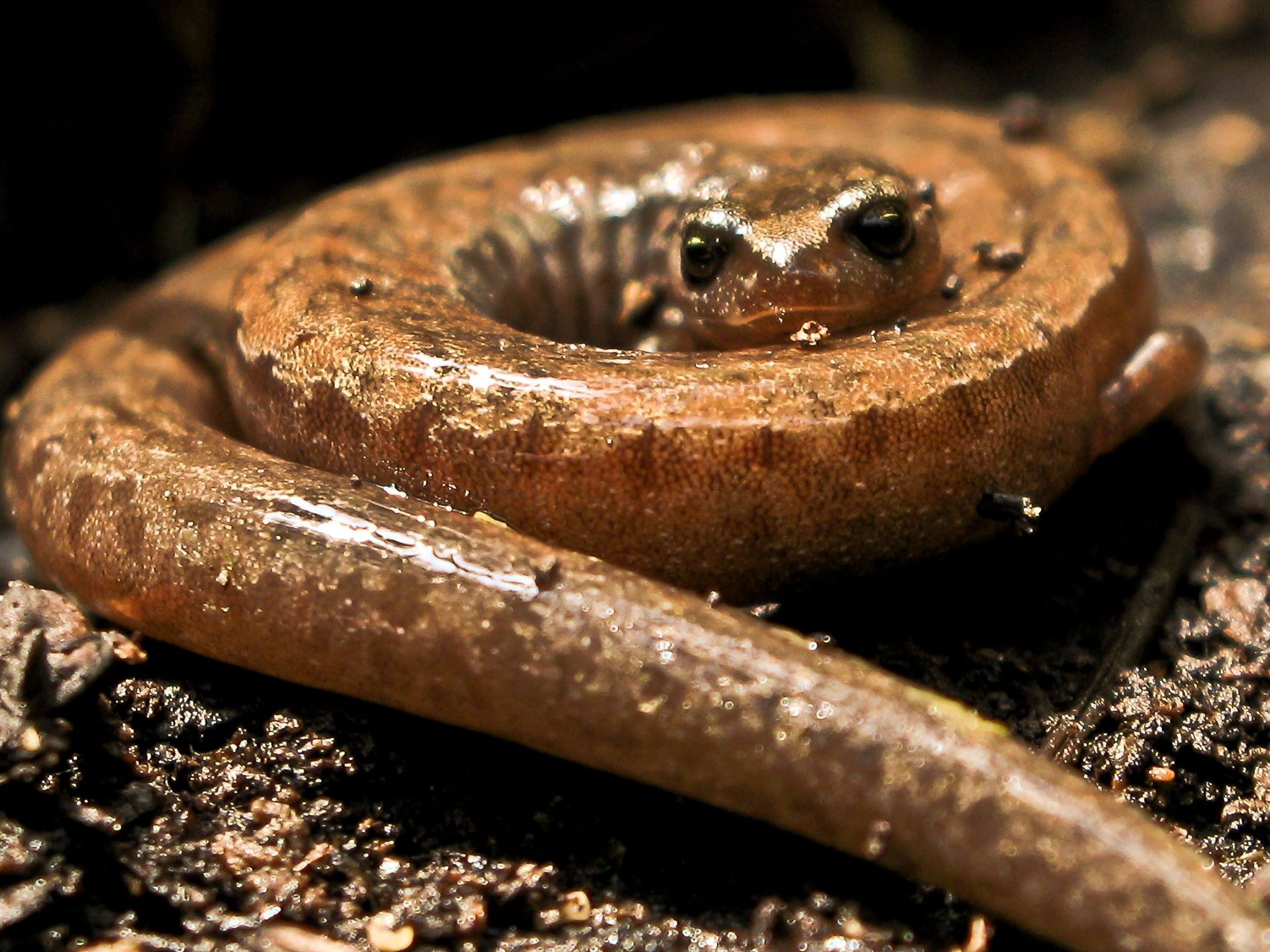
- Batrachoseps attenuatus

Scientific classification
- Kingdom: Animalia
- Phylum: Chordata
- Class: Amphibia
- Order: Urodela
- Family: Plethodontidae
- Subfamily: Hemidactyliinae
- Genus: Batrachoseps; Bonaparte, 1839

Species
- See table

= Slender salamander =

Slender salamanders

Genus of salamanders

Batrachoseps is a genus of lungless salamanders (plethodontids) often called slender salamanders. They can be distinguished from other lungless salamanders by the four toes they have on each foot.

Their genus name Batracho-seps means "frog-lizard", in reference to their projectile tongues.

== Diet and physiology ==
The lungless salamanders, in addition to having no lungs, have long slender snake-shaped bodies with very small limbs that appear almost vestigial in several species. Their main diet consists of small insects, such as springtails, small bark beetles, crickets, young snails, mites, and spiders. Like all salamanders in this family, they have long frog-like projectile tongues which they use to grab their prey in a flash.

Unlike all other amphibians (and birds, and lizards, and nearly all fish) mature red blood cells in species in the genus Batrachoseps have no nucleus, which is a trait that is known to occur only in mammals and certain species of antarctic fish.

== Distribution ==
Batrachoseps range from Oregon and California (US) to northern Baja California (Mexico). Slender salamanders in California tolerate a diverse variety of environments, as long as their basic needs are met.

== Species ==
Twenty-one species are recognized in this genus, but their taxonomy is uncertain. Some species may in fact be subspecies of others, and some subspecies may be distinct species of their own. Genetic analysis is in process.

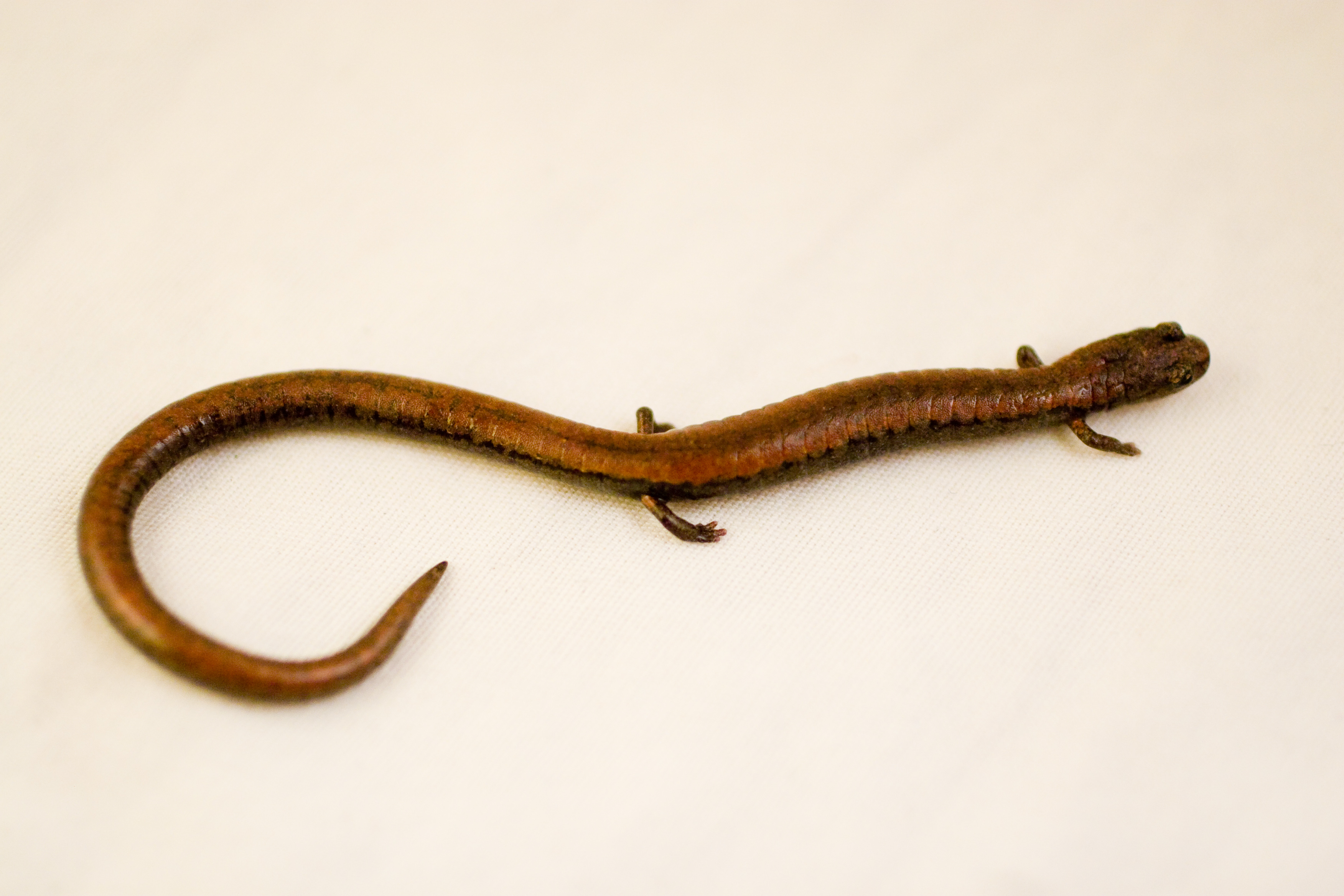
Batrachoseps gavilanensis – Gabilan Mountains slender salamander

Image	Common name	Scientific name	Year described	Distribution
	Greenhorn Mountains slender salamander	Batrachoseps altasierrae	Jockusch et al., 2012	Kern and Tulare counties, California, US
	California slender salamander	Batrachoseps attenuatus	Eschscholtz, 1833	Sierra Nevada, California, and northern Central Valley of California, and southwestern Oregon
	Fairview slender salamander	Batrachoseps bramei	Jockusch, et al., 2012	California
	Inyo Mountains slender salamander	Batrachoseps campi	Marlow, Brode & Wake, 1979	Inyo County of eastern California
	Hell Hollow slender salamander	Batrachoseps diabolicus	Jockusch, Wake & Yanev, 1998	California, in Mariposa County
	San Gabriel slender salamander	Batrachoseps gabrieli	Wake, 1996	San Gabriel Mountains of Los Angeles County, California
	Gabilan Mountains slender salamander	Batrachoseps gavilanensis	Jockusch, Yanev & Wake, 2001	Central Coast region from Santa Cruz to northern Kern County, California
	Gregarious slender salamander	Batrachoseps gregarius	Jockusch, Wake & Yanev, 1998	western Sierra Nevada and the eastern Central Valley in California
	San Simeon slender salamander	Batrachoseps incognitus	Jockusch, Yanev & Wake, 2001	south-western Monterey and northern San Luis Obispo Counties, California
	Sequoia slender salamander	Batrachoseps kawia	Jockusch, Wake & Yanev, 1998	Tulare County, California
	San Lucia Mountains slender salamander	Batrachoseps luciae	Jockusch, Yanev & Wake, 2001	Monterey County, California
	Garden slender salamander	Batrachoseps major	Camp, 1915	northern Baja California in Mexico and Southern California, United States
	Lesser slender salamander	Batrachoseps minor	Jockusch, Yanev & Wake, 1998	San Luis Obispo County, California
	Black-bellied slender salamander	Batrachoseps nigriventris	Cope, 1869	California
	Pacific slender salamander	Batrachoseps pacificus	(Cope, 1865)	Channel Islands of California
	King's River slender salamander	Batrachoseps regius	Jockusch, Wake & Yanev, 1998	Fresno County, California
	Relictual slender salamander	Batrachoseps relictus	Brame & Murray, 1968	Kern County, California.
	Kern Plateau slender salamander	Batrachoseps robustus	Wake, Yanev & Hansen, 2002	Tulare and Inyo, and Kern Counties, California
	Kern Canyon slender salamander	Batrachoseps simatus	Brame & Murray, 1968	Kern County, California
	Tehachapi slender salamander	Batrachoseps stebbinsi	Brame & Murray, 1968	Kern County, California
	Arguello slender salamander	Batrachoseps wakei	Sweet & Jockusch, 2021	Santa Barbara County, California
	Oregon slender salamander	Batrachoseps wrighti	(Bishop, 1937)	Oregon

== Intrinsic Phylogeny ==
- - - Batrachoseps wrighti
    - Batrachoseps campi
  - - - - Batrachoseps diabolicus
        - Batrachoseps regius
      - - Batrachoseps kawia
        - Batrachoseps relictus
    - - - Batrachoseps gabrieli
        - - Batrachoseps gavilanensis
          - - Batrachoseps major
            - Batrachoseps pacificus
      - - Batrachoseps attenuatus
        - - Batrachoseps gregarius
          - - Batrachoseps simatus
            - Batrachoseps nigriventris

Intrinsic phylogeny tree of genus Batrachoseps.

== See also ==
- Elizabeth Jockusch
