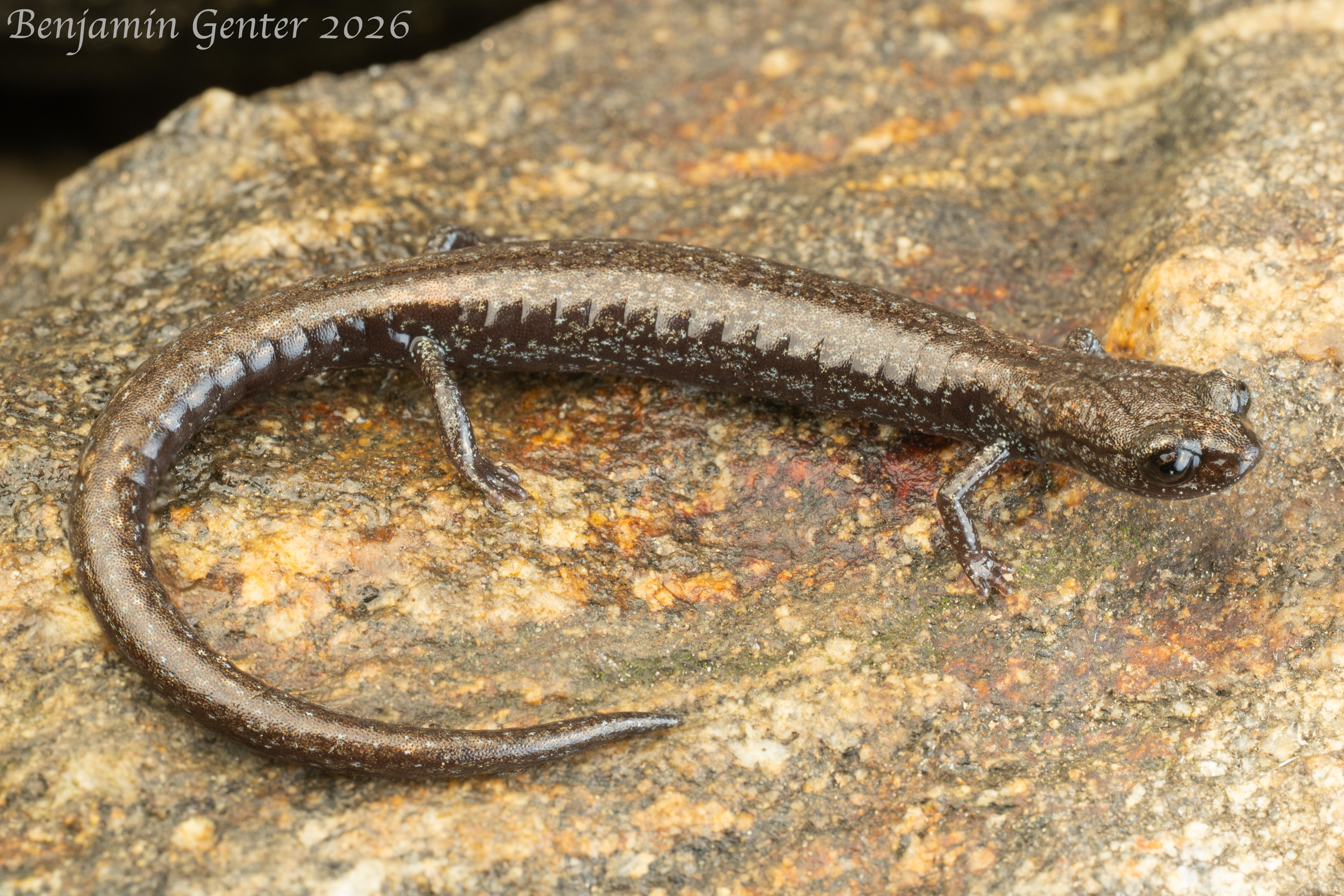

Conservation status
- Near Threatened (IUCN 3.1)

Scientific classification
- Kingdom: Animalia
- Phylum: Chordata
- Class: Amphibia
- Order: Urodela
- Family: Plethodontidae
- Genus: Batrachoseps
- Species: B. gabrieli

Binomial name
- Batrachoseps gabrieli Wake, 1996

= San Gabriel slender salamander =

Species of amphibian

The San Gabriel slender salamander (Batrachoseps gabrieli) is a species of salamander. It has a worm-like body, a large head and large limbs, and an elongate cylindrical tail of less than 1.5 times its body length. An adult salamander is between 3 and 5 cm long. It has a black dorsum with white, coppery, and orange blotches, and an immaculate black venter. It may have red spots on tail.

B. gabrieli is similar to the related species B. pacificus and B. nigriventis.

This species is only known from the San Gabriel Canyon system, and typically lives above 850 meters in the San Gabriel Mountains of Los Angeles County.
