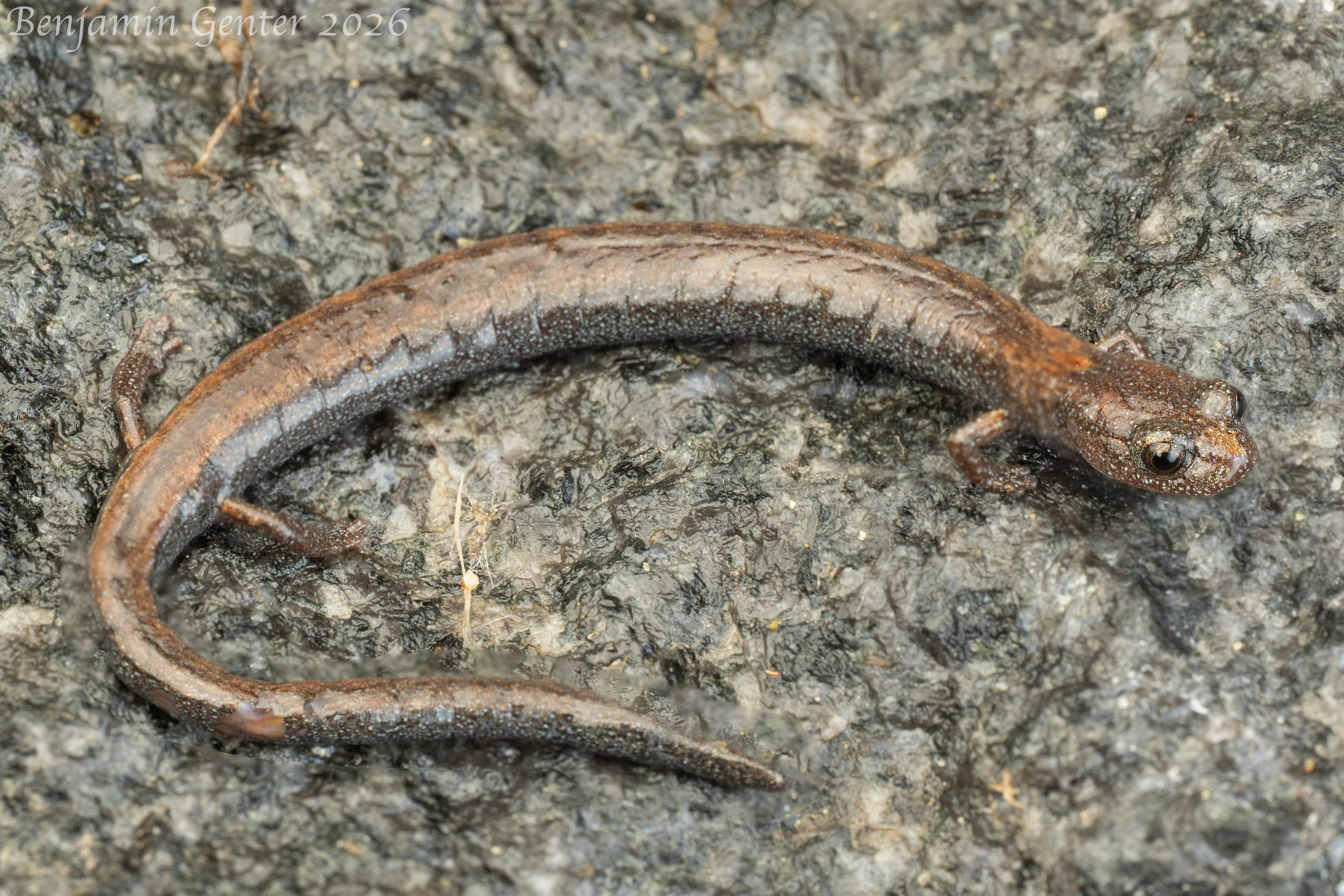

Conservation status
- Least Concern (IUCN 3.1)

Scientific classification
- Kingdom: Animalia
- Phylum: Chordata
- Class: Amphibia
- Order: Urodela
- Family: Plethodontidae
- Genus: Batrachoseps
- Species: B. gregarius

Binomial name
- Batrachoseps gregarius Jockusch, Wake & Yanev, 1998

= Gregarious slender salamander =

Species of amphibian

The gregarious slender salamander (Batrachoseps gregarius) is a species of salamander in the family Plethodontidae. Its natural habitats are California interior chaparral and woodlands and temperate grasslands in the lower foothills of the western Sierra Nevada and the eastern Central Valley in California, United States.

== Description ==
The gregarious slender salamander is a small, slender species with a narrow head, short limbs, small hands and feet and a long tail that tapers near the tip. It has a brown dorsal band of colour, blackish back and sides dotted with white specks grading to a pale grey ventral region. The dorsal band starts at a golden-brown to tan region on the neck and extends along the spine as far as the tail. It varies in colour in different individuals from light brown, with dark flecks and bright highlights, to a much darker colour. The maximum snout-to-vent length of an adult is less than 50 mm (2.0 in).

== Distribution and habitat ==
The gregarious slender salamander is endemic to the western slopes of the southern and central Sierra Nevada in California, United States. It occurs at altitudes of up to 1,800 m (6,000 ft) but in the southern parts of its range seldom occurs above 900 m (3,000 ft). Its range includes riparian zones in the Central Valley and it is common in southern Tulare County and northern Kern County in the drainages of the White River and its tributary, the Arrastre Creek. The habitat is quite variable over different parts of the range but is mainly relatively open oak woodland with interior live oak (Quercus wislizeni), blue oak (Quercus douglasii) and foothill pine (Pinus sabiniana), or sometimes mixed coniferous forest with ponderosa pine (Pinus ponderosa), incense cedar (Calocedrus), white fir (Abies concolor) and California black oak (Quercus kelloggii). In the north of its range, it is plentiful in coniferous forest with sugar pine (Pinus lambertiana) and giant sequoias (Sequoiadendron giganteum) and near the Kern River, in the south of its range, it is found in dry grassland with scattered boulders.

== Reproduction ==
Reproduction is seasonal in this species. In the southern part of its range and at lower elevations, egg laying usually takes place soon after the start of the rainy season, but at higher elevations it takes place later. The female deposits a clutch of eggs in a well-hidden location, under bark, under a fallen log or a rock, or in leaf-litter in a moist place, often near a seep or stream. Usually, the eggs are laid in communal nests. Such nests have been found with over 300 eggs which are estimated to have been deposited there by more than 18 females. Larger females tend to produce larger clutches, and the mean clutch size of females from the northern part of the range is 15.3 while that for the southern part is 7.3. Once laid, the eggs are not guarded by the mother, although male adults and young salamanders may continue to take refuge nearby. The eggs develop directly into miniature versions of the adult without there being an intervening larval stage. In the laboratory they take 65 to 73 days to hatch and they may take a similar length of time in the wild.

== Status ==
The IUCN lists the gregarious slender salamander as being of "Least Concern". It occurs in a range of habitat types and the population seems to be stable. No particular threats have been identified for this species apart from the destruction of its habitat.
