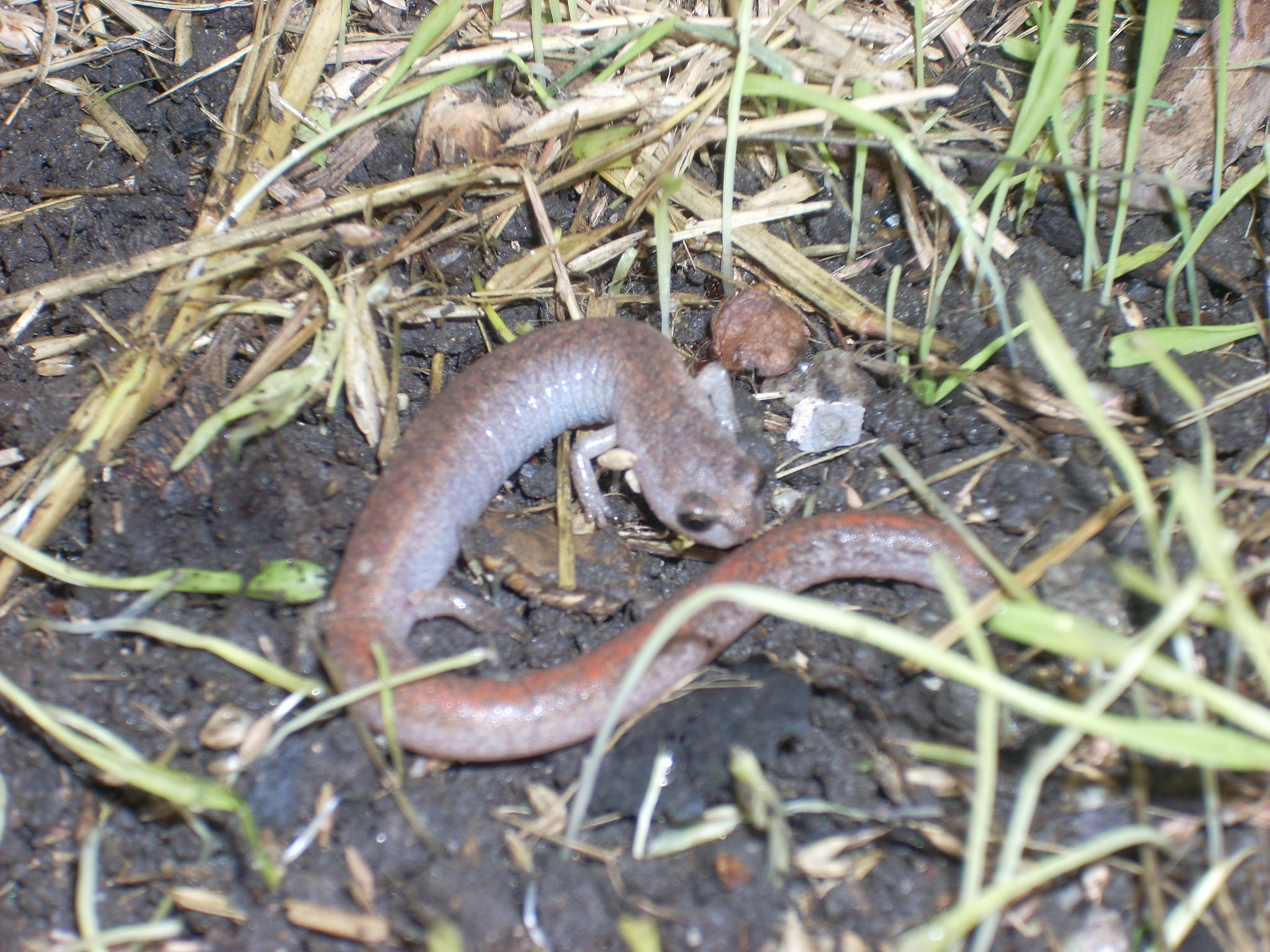

Conservation status
- Least Concern (IUCN 3.1)

Scientific classification
- Kingdom: Animalia
- Phylum: Chordata
- Class: Amphibia
- Order: Urodela
- Family: Plethodontidae
- Genus: Batrachoseps
- Species: B. major

Binomial name
- Batrachoseps major Camp, 1915

= Garden slender salamander =

Species of slender salamander

The Garden slender salamander (Batrachoseps major) or Southern California slender salamander is a species of salamander in the family Plethodontidae. It is endemic to northern Baja California in Mexico and Southern California in the United States.

== Description ==
While Batrachoseps major is a small salamander, it is larger than most other Batrachoseps slender salamanders. Adults are 3.2–5.9 centimetres (1.3–2.3 in) in length and have 17-21 costal grooves. Like other Batrachoseps, B. major has only four toes on its hind feet.

Color is variable, but individuals are usually some form of gray. A key identification feature is the color of the underside, which is pale for B. major. This is the simplest method to distinguish B. major from the similar B. nigriventris where the two co-occur, although the latter is typically also much smaller and less robust.

== Taxonomy ==
There are currently two described subspecies of Batrachoseps major:

- Batrachoseps major major: Garden slender salamander or Southern California slender salamander
- Batrachoseps major aridus: Desert slender salamander

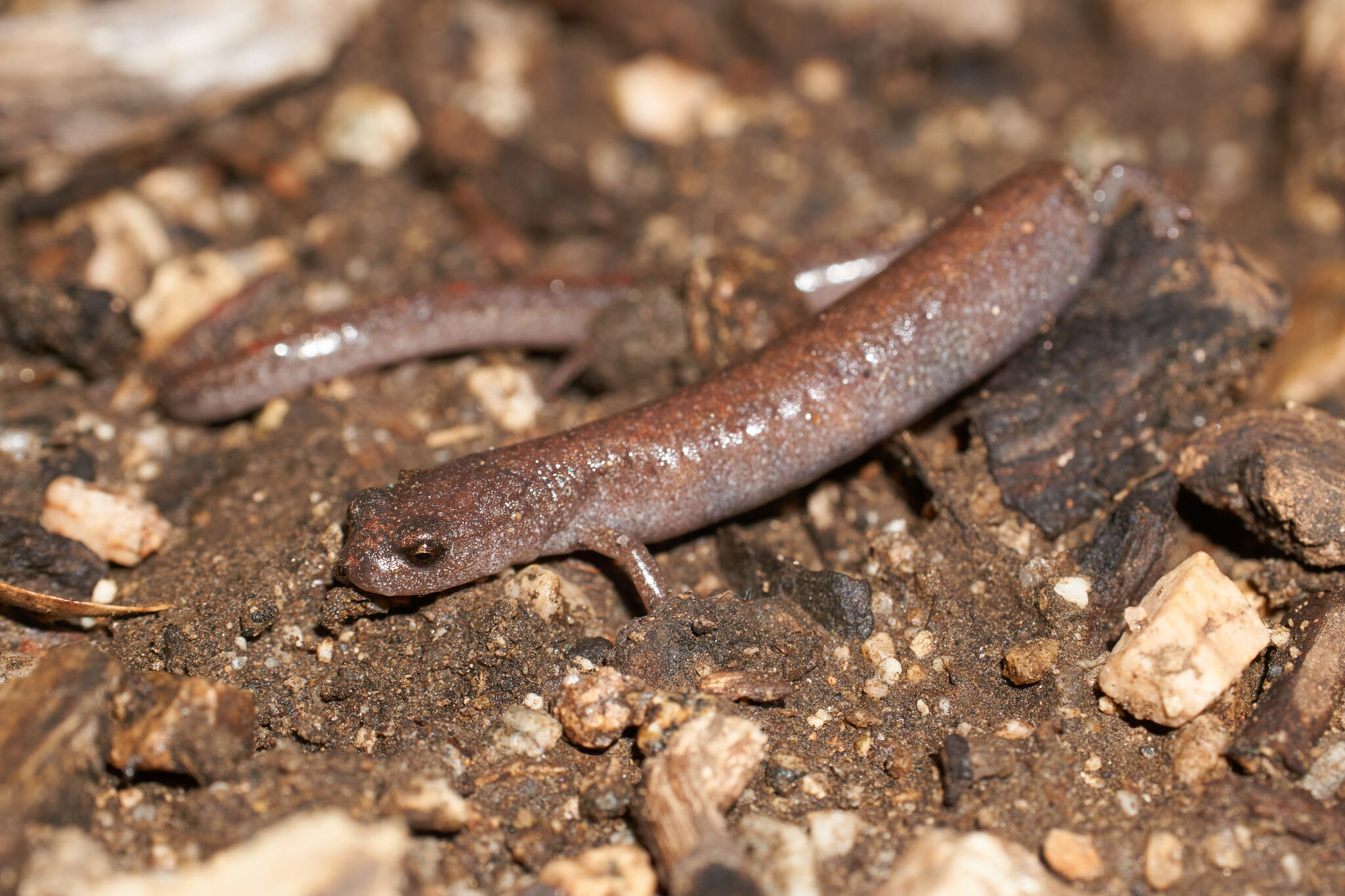
B. m. major found under a log near Pasadena, California

== Distribution and habitat ==
Batrachoseps major is endemic to a relatively small portion of southern California and northwestern Baja California within the California Floristic Province, ranging from the San Fernando Valley in the north south to Ensenada, with records as far south as El Rosario and the Sierra de San Pedro Mártir. It also occurs on Santa Catalina Island, the Coronado islands, and the Todos Santos islands, though it was probably introduced there. Despite its small geographic range, it is generally abundant within that range.

This species primarily, but not exclusively, occurs in lowland habitats. In the northern part of its range in Los Angeles County, B. major is restricted to low elevation valleys and basins. It is not found any significant distance into the Transverse Ranges in the county, including the San Gabriel Mountains and Santa Monica Mountains where B. nigriventris is instead present. Further south, in the parts of the Peninsular Ranges where B. nigriventris does not occur, B. major occupies a wider range of elevations and is found throughout the peninsular ranges of San Diego County and northwest Baja California.

Native habitat for B. major includes coastal sage scrub, oak woodland, conifer forests, and, rarely, north-facing slopes of desert mountains in the Peninsular ranges. This species is also one of the few native California amphibians to adapt reasonably well to urban development, and the species occurs throughout the heavily developed Los Angeles Basin in yards and other similar non-native habitat where moisture is present.

In the northern part of its range, B. major often co-occurs with B. nigriventris, sometimes being found underneath cover side-by-side.

=== Desert slender salamander (B. m. aridus) ===
The subspecies B. m. aridus is by far the rarer of the two described subspecies, and may be extinct, having not been recorded since 1996. It inhabits a tiny range consisting of Sonoran desert palm oases in just two canyons (Hidden Palm Canyon and Guadalupe Canyon) at approximately 850 metres (2,790 ft) elevation in the Santa Rosa Mountains above the city of Palm Springs. B. m. aridus occupies limestone seeps with permanent water shaded by California fan palms, enabling its survival in a dry environment otherwise completely inhospitable to salamanders.

== Ecology ==
=== Activity ===
Due to the extremely dry summer climate in coastal California and neighboring northwest Baja California, B. major (along with almost every other coastal California salamander) is only active above ground in the wetter winter months, typically from as early as October to as late as June. These salamanders are active near the surface when soil temperatures are between 5–21 °C (41–70 °F), though some of this may be due to there being insufficient moisture for activity in the hot summer months when soil temperatures would be higher.

=== Diet ===
Batrachoseps major feeds on worms, insects, and other invertebrates, using its long tongue to grab prey. Swallowing prey can often take longer than 30 minutes after it has been captured by the salamander.

== Conservation ==
While Batrachoseps major is threatened by habitat loss along with most native species occurring in coastal southern California, it is an IUCN Red List species of least concern. B. major is able to adapt to dramatically human-altered habitats, such as suburban yards, to a greater extent than most other local amphibians, and as such is able to inhabit urban areas where other native wildlife has been wiped out.

One subspecies, the desert slender salamander (B. m. aridus, sometimes Batrachoseps aridus), is a federally listed endangered species of the United States. It is possibly extinct, with no individuals being found since 1996. However, a thorough search has not been conducted in several decades, and it is possible that salamanders remain undetected.
