= Elizabeth Jockusch =

American biologist

- Education: Oberlin College; University of California, Berkeley (PhD)
- Scientific career
- Fields: Evolutionary biology
- Workplaces: University of Connecticut
- Academic advisors: David Wake

Elizabeth L. Jockusch is an American evolutionary biologist who studies plethodontidae salamanders and other organisms. While working with David Wake and others, she has identified multiple new species of Batrachoseps salamanders. She is the head of the Ecology and Evolutionary Biology department at the University of Connecticut, which she joined in 1999. She is also the director of the Jockusch Lab and is currently the department head of the Ecology and Evolutionary Biology Department at the University of Connecticut.

In 2014, she was elected to the council of the Society of Systematic Biologists for a three-year term.

== Selected publications ==
- Elizabeth L. Jockusch. (1997). An Evolutionary Correlate of Genome Size Change in Plethodontid Salamanders. Proceedings: Biological Sciences, 264(1381), 597–604.
- Jockusch, E.L. and Wake, D.B. 2002. Falling apart and merging: diversification of slender salamanders (Plethodontidae: Batrachoseps) in the American West. Biological Journal of the Linnean Society, 76: 361–391. https://doi.org/10.1046/j.1095-8312.2002.00071.x
- Galis F, Wagner GP, Jockusch EL. Why is limb regeneration possible in amphibians but not in reptiles, birds, and mammals? Evolution & Development. 2003;5(2):208-220. doi:10.1046/j.1525-142X.2003.03028.x
- Evans, A. E., Urban, M. C., & Jockusch, E. L. (2020). Developmental temperature influences color polymorphism but not hatchling size in a woodland salamander. Oecologia, 192(4), 909. https://doi.org/10.1007/s00442-020-04630-y
- Jockusch EL, Hansen RW, Fisher RN, Wake DB. 2020. Slender salamanders (genus Batrachoseps) reveal Southern California to be a center for the diversification, persistence, and introduction of salamander lineages. PeerJ 8:e9599 https://doi.org/10.7717/peerj.9599
- Jockusch, Elizabeth L, Fisher, Cera R. August 2021. Something old, something new, something borrowed, something red: the origin of ecologically relevant novelties in Hemiptera. Current Opinion in Genetics & Development, 69. https://doi.org/10.1016/j.gde.2021.04.003
- Samuel S. Sweet, Elizabeth L. Jockusch "A New Relict Species of Slender Salamander (Plethodontidae: Batrachoseps) with a Tiny Range from Point Arguello, California," Ichthyology & Herpetology, 109(3), 836–850, (23 September 2021)
