= Kern Plateau salamander =

Conservation status
- Near Threatened (IUCN 3.1)

Scientific classification
- Kingdom: Animalia
- Phylum: Chordata
- Class: Amphibia
- Order: Urodela
- Family: Plethodontidae
- Genus: Batrachoseps
- Species: B. robustus

Binomial name
- Batrachoseps robustus Wake, Yanev & Hansen, 2002

Species of amphibian

The Kern Plateau salamander (Batrachoseps robustus) is a species of salamander in the family Plethodontidae, endemic to California, in Tulare and Inyo, and Kern Counties in the western United States.

== Distribution ==
This salamander is endemic to three locations in the southern Sierra Nevada: in the upper Kern River's Kern Plateau; the western margin of the Owens Valley; and the Scodie Mountains, at elevations from 1,615–2,800 metres (5,299–9,186 ft).

Its natural habitat is freshwater springs in the temperate coniferous forests and in higher Mojave Desert-Sierra forest ecotones.

== Conservation ==
The Kern Plateau salamander is threatened by habitat loss, and it is an IUCN Red List Near threatened species.
