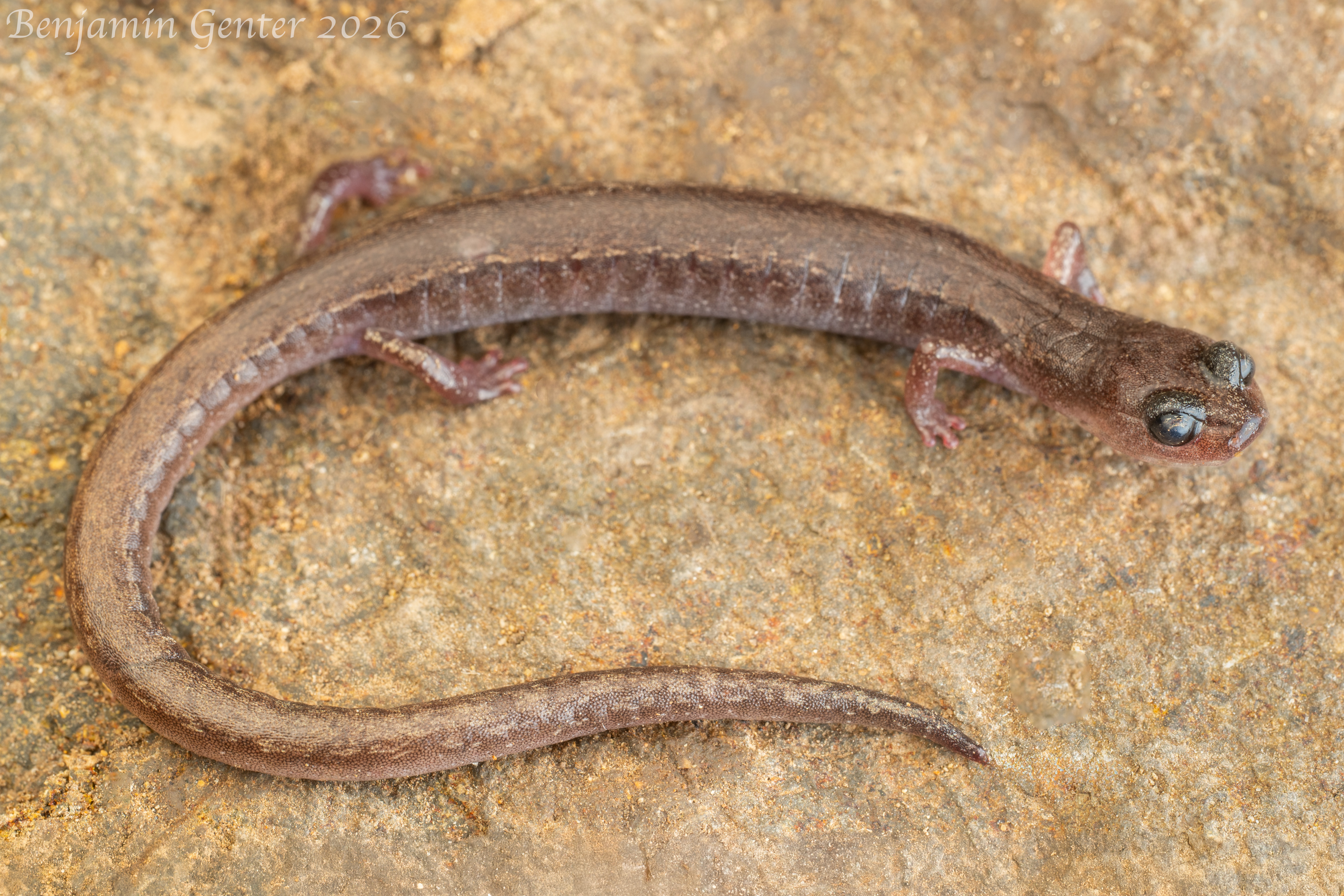
- Adult from Santa Cruz Island

Conservation status
- Least Concern (IUCN 3.1)

- Apparently Secure (NatureServe)

Scientific classification
- Kingdom: Animalia
- Phylum: Chordata
- Class: Amphibia
- Order: Urodela
- Family: Plethodontidae
- Genus: Batrachoseps
- Species: B. pacificus

Binomial name
- Batrachoseps pacificus (Cope, 1865)

= Channel Islands slender salamander =

Species of amphibian

The Channel Islands slender salamander (Batrachoseps pacificus) is a species of salamander in the family Plethodontidae. Due to cool and foggy conditions on the islands where it lives, it is one of the only slender salamanders in California that can be active year-round.

== Description ==
The Channel Islands slender salamander, like all slender salamanders, has short limbs, a narrow head, a lean body, and an especially elongated tail, as well as four toes on its feet. However, it has a more robust appearance than other slender salamanders due to its longer legs. Adults are 4.2 - 7 centimeters long (1.67 - 2.75 in) from snout to vent. Dorsal surface coloration ranges from brown to pinkish, with a prominent dorsal stripe made up of light speckles. The throat and underside of the tail are pale, while the abdomen appears whitish or slate with light and dark speckling. Its rib connections are indicated by a series of 18-20 costal grooves, which are clearly visible along with its end of torso grooves.

== Behavior and ecology ==
When disturbed, this salamander may coil up and remain motionless, relying on camouflage. Alternatively, it can rapidly uncoil and bounce away while detaching its tail to divert the attention of predators. Although the tail can easily be broken off, it regenerates over time.

=== Reproduction ===
Using burrows created by other animals or man-made crevices, eggs are laid underground by the female during late fall to winter, once they move down from the surface. Each egg set can consist of 13-20 eggs. After the offspring hatch, from winter to early spring, both adult and young salamanders return to the surface with rain the following fall and winter. There is significant variation in this cycle with meteorological fluctuations.

=== Diet ===
The Channel Islands slender salamander likely eats an assortment of small invertebrates, such as earthworms, small slugs, terrestrial arthropods, and numerous insects, including insect larvae. It is probable that they use a projectile tongue to capture prey above and below ground.

== Distribution and habitat ==
Batrachoseps pacificus is endemic to the northern California Channel Islands, being found on San Miguel Island, Santa Rosa Island, Santa Cruz Island, and Anacapa Island. It is the only amphibian endemic to the islands off California.

On the islands where it occurs, the Channel Islands slender salamander occupies a wide range of habitats, including island coastal sage scrub, grasslands, chaparral, oak woodlands, pine woodlands, and, uniquely, beaches containing driftwood.
