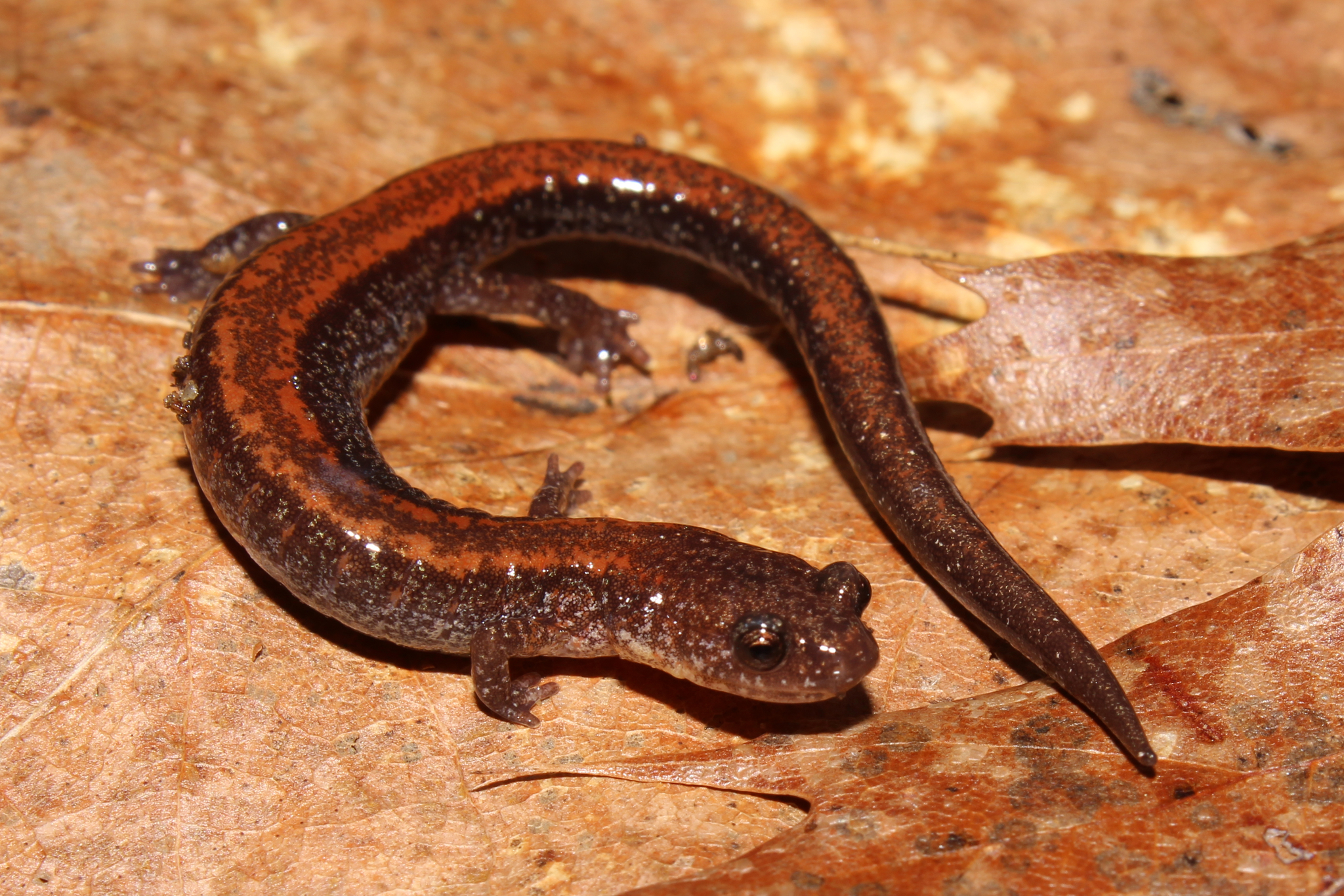
- Red-backed salamander (Plethodon cinereus)

Scientific classification
- Kingdom: Animalia
- Phylum: Chordata
- Class: Amphibia
- Order: Urodela
- Family: Plethodontidae
- Subfamily: Plethodontinae
- Genus: Plethodon; Tschudi, 1838

Synonyms
- Sauropsis Fitzinger, 1843; Hightonia Vieites, Román, Wake, and Wake, 2011

= Plethodon =

Plethodon Temporal range: Hemphillian–recent

Genus of salamanders

Plethodon is a genus of salamanders in the family Plethodontidae. They are commonly known as woodland salamanders. All members of the genus are endemic to North America (Canada and the United States). They have no aquatic larval stage. In some species, such as the red-backed salamander (Plethodon cinereus), young hatch in the adult form. Members of Plethodon primarily eat small invertebrates. The earliest known fossils of this genus are from the Hemphillian of Tennessee in the United States.

== Taxonomy ==
Plethodon is part of the family Plethodontidae (lungless salamanders) and the subfamily Plethodontinae. The genus Plethodon can be divided into two subgenera: the nominal subgenus Plethodon, which includes up to 49 eastern species (the bulk of diversity in the genus), and the subgenus Hightonia, which includes 9 species native to the western part of North America.

The eastern Plethodon subgenus can be further categorized into at least three major species groups which genetic analyses confirm to be clades:

- The Plethodon cinereus group, which contains the ubiquitous red-backed salamander and 9 other small, slender species (P. electromorphus, P. hoffmani, P. hubrichti, P. nettingi, P. richmondi, P. serratus, P. shenandoah, P. sherando, and P. virginia).
- The Plethodon wehrlei group is a species complex centered on Wehrle's salamander and at least 4 of its close relatives (P. dixi, P. jacksoni, P. pauleyi, P. punctatus). Some of these species were only formally distinguished from P. wehrlei as recently as 2019.
- The Plethodon welleri group includes Weller's salamander and the three species of zigzag salamander (P. angusticlavius, P. dorsalis, P. ventralis). Many studies have argued that the wehrlei and welleri groups should be conceived of as one larger clade, the Plethodon wehrlei-welleri group.
- The Plethodon glutinosus group is the largest species group within Plethodon, with around 30 species and several subordinate species complexes. Many species within this group (including the nominal species) are commonly known as "slimy salamanders", characterized by a large size, robust build and black-and-white coloration. Not all members of the Plethodon glutinosus group are labelled as slimy salamanders, and species delimitation among slimy salamanders and their close relatives is a subject of continued debate. For example, some studies interpret Plethodon grobmani and Plethodon mississippi to be junior synonyms of Plethodon glutinosus, based on a lack of genetic or anatomical distinctiveness.
- One difficult-to-classify species is Webster's salamander, which may lie among the wehrlei-welleri group or the glutinosus group, or outside both groups, depending on the study.

== List of species ==
As of 2024 there are up to 58 species in the genus Plethodon. Most are native to eastern and central North America, with the Appalachian Mountains having the highest diversity. Seven species live along the West Coast, one (P. idahoensis) in the Rocky Mountains of Idaho, and one (P. neomexicanus) in the Jemez Mountains of New Mexico.

All 58 Plethodon species listed in alphabetical order of specific name:

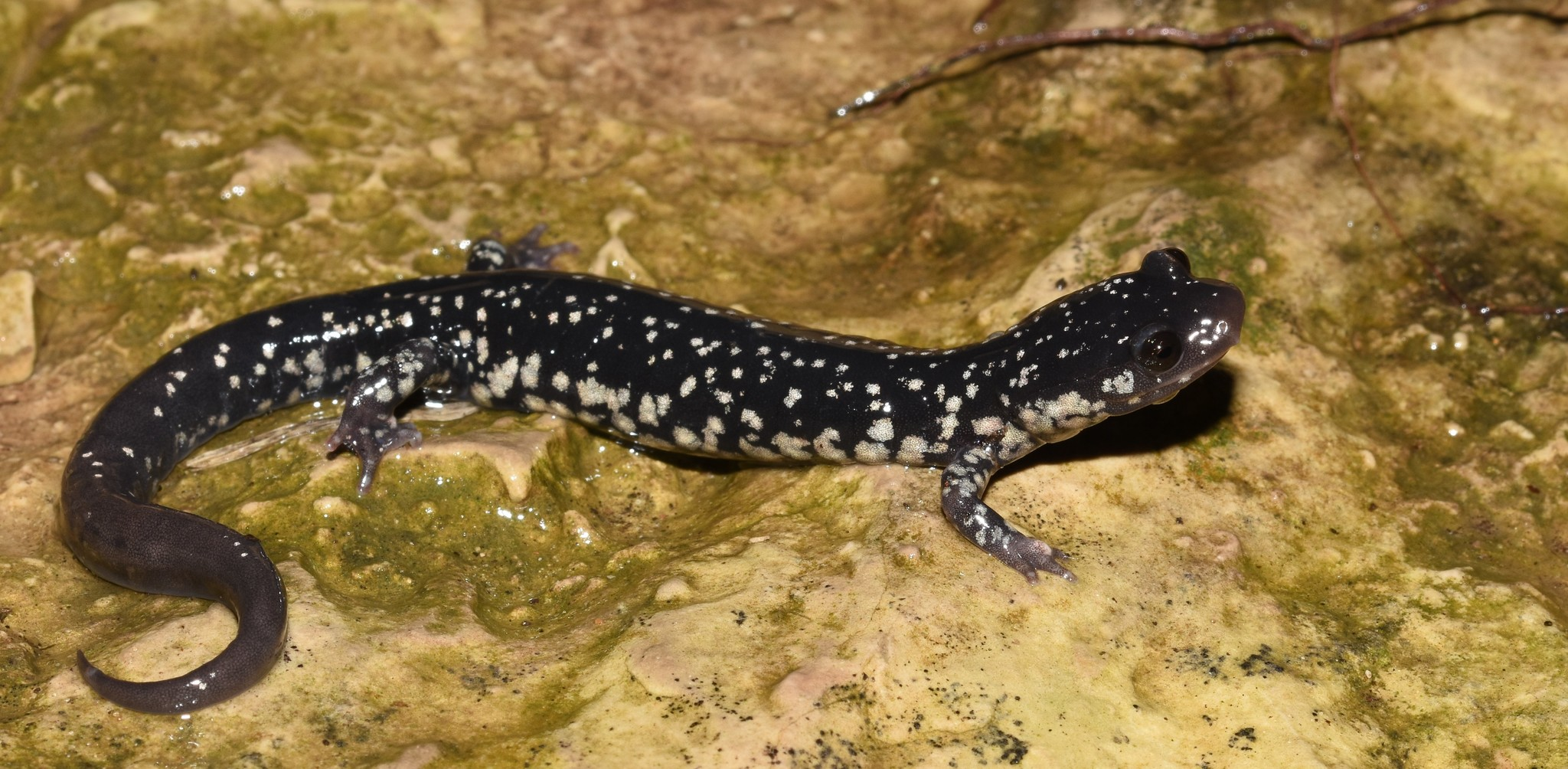
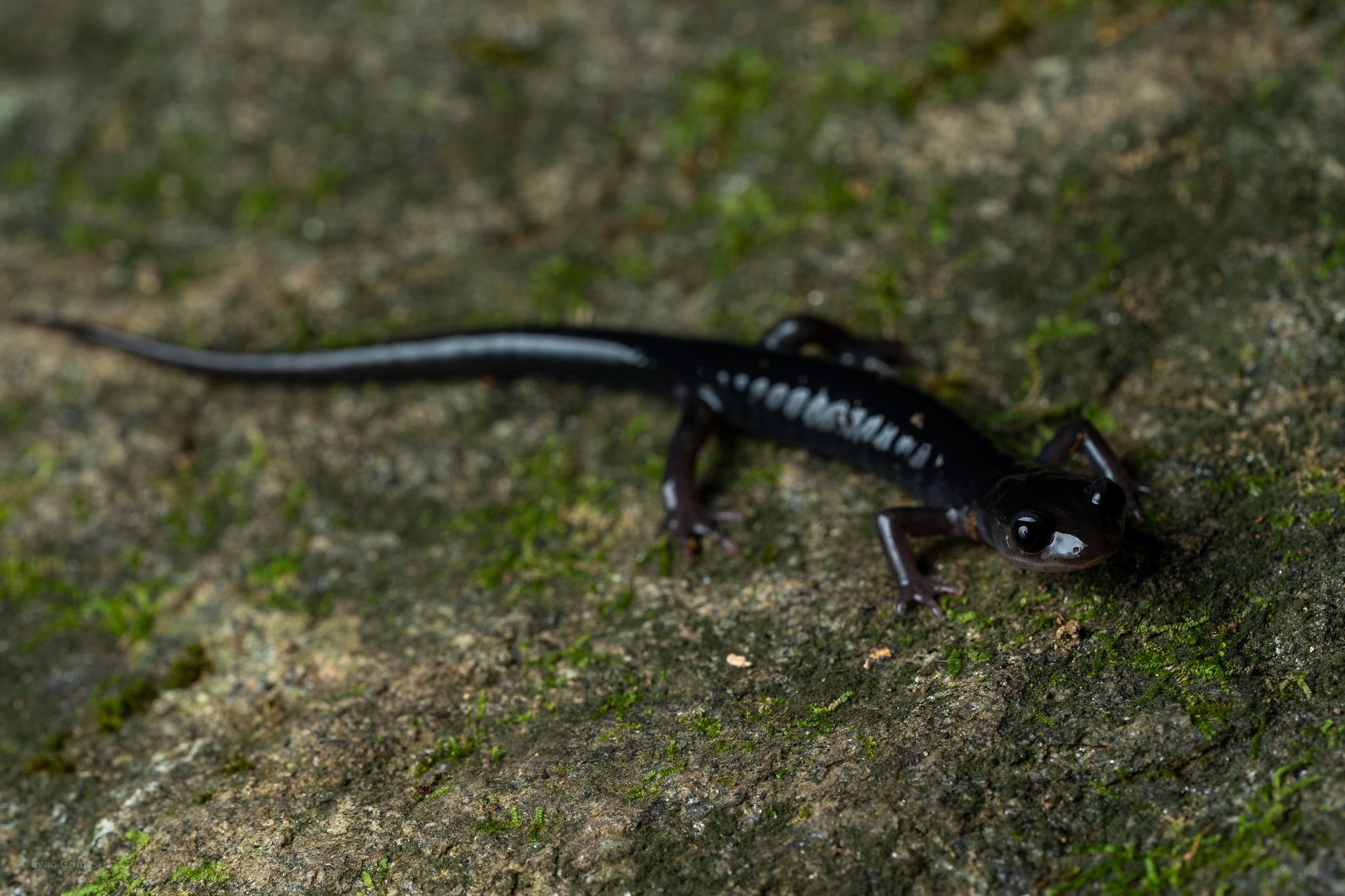
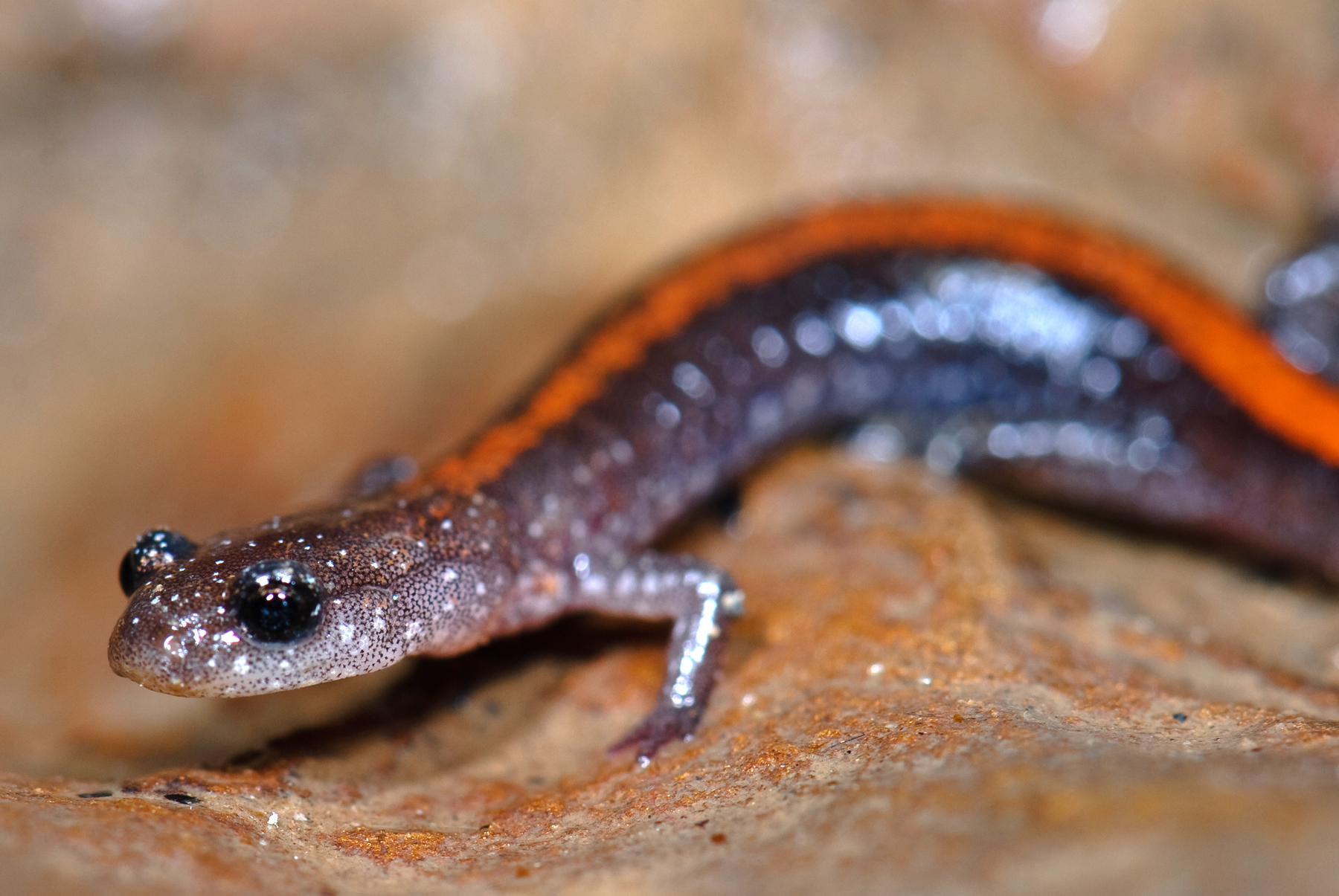
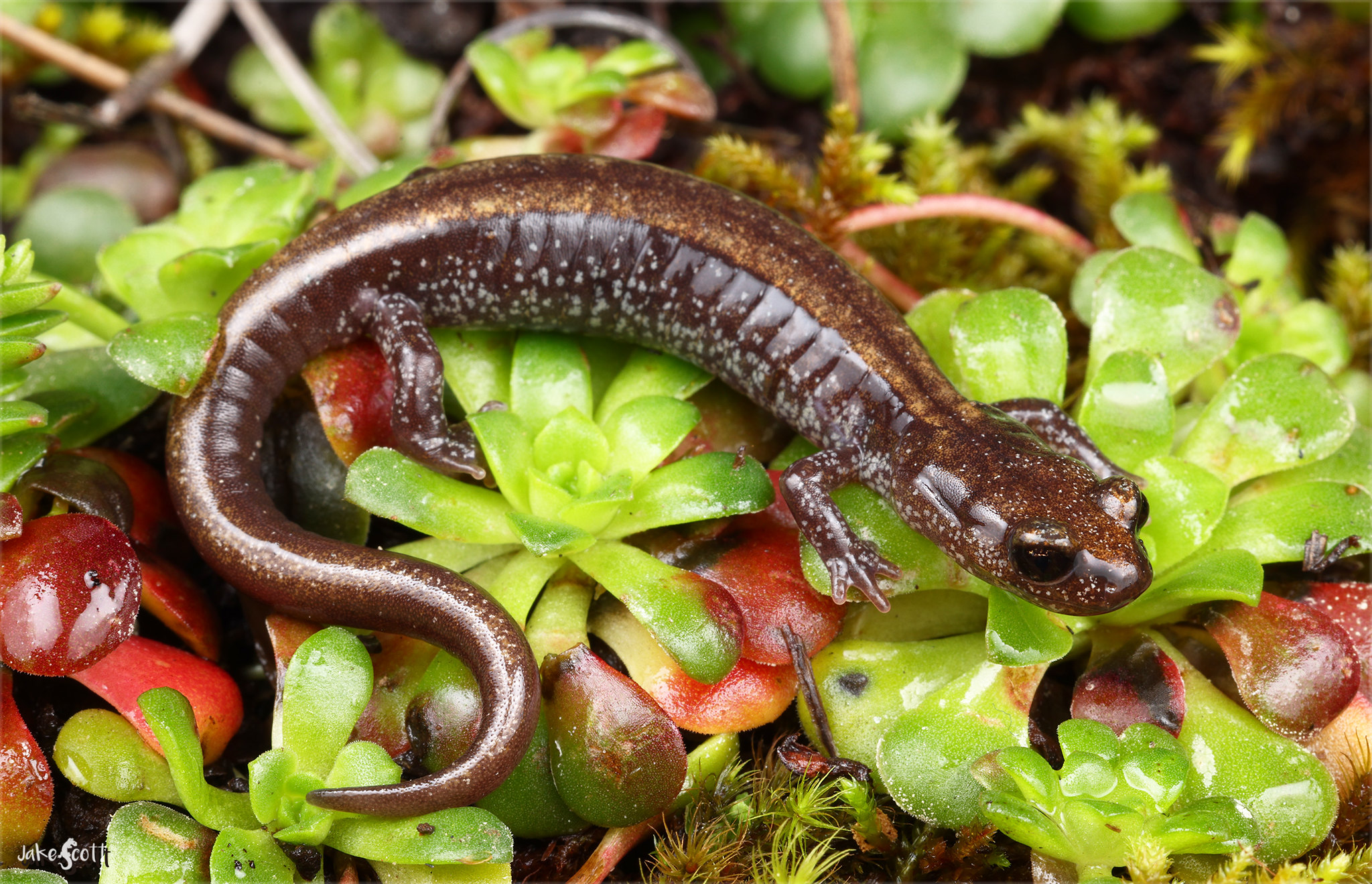
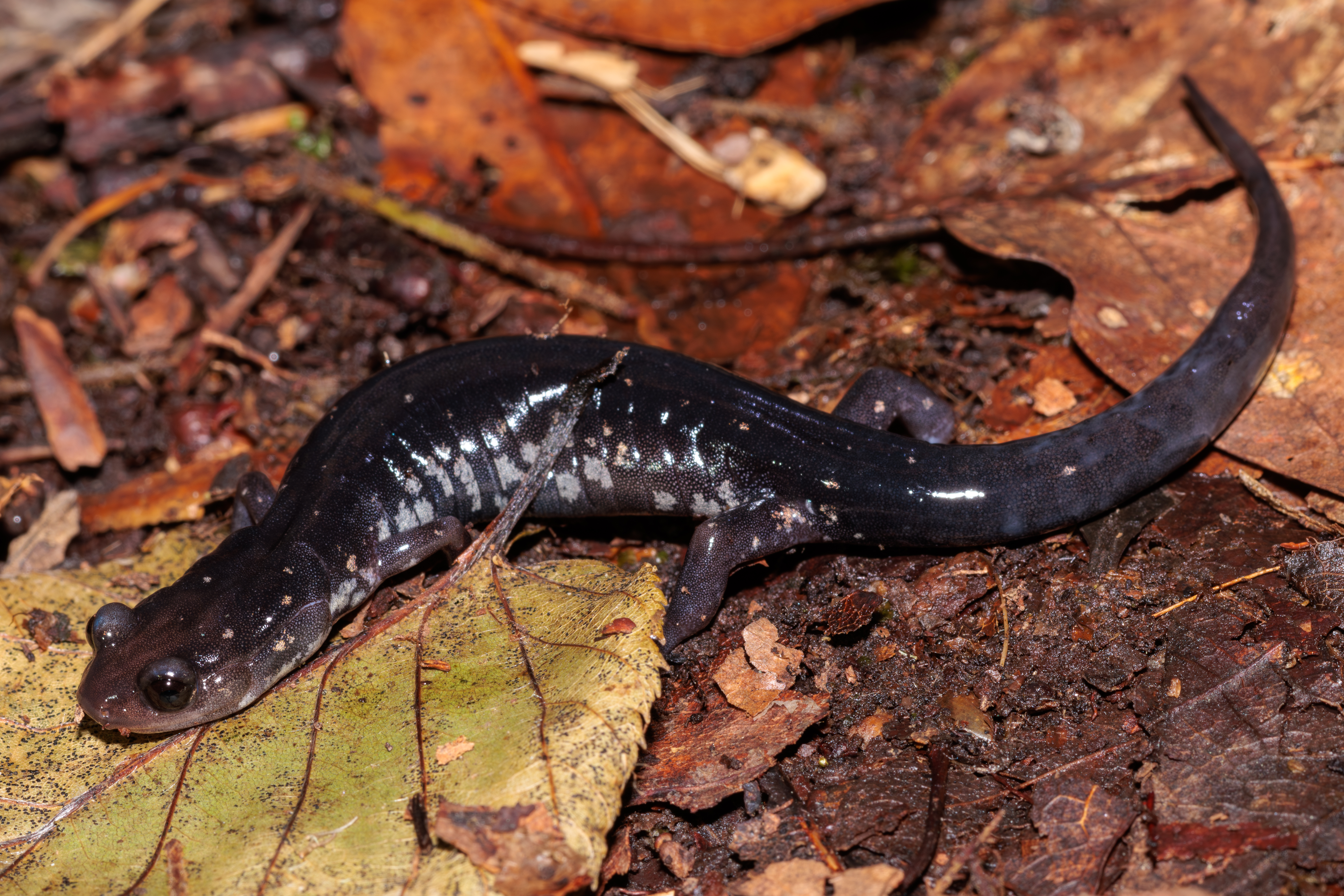
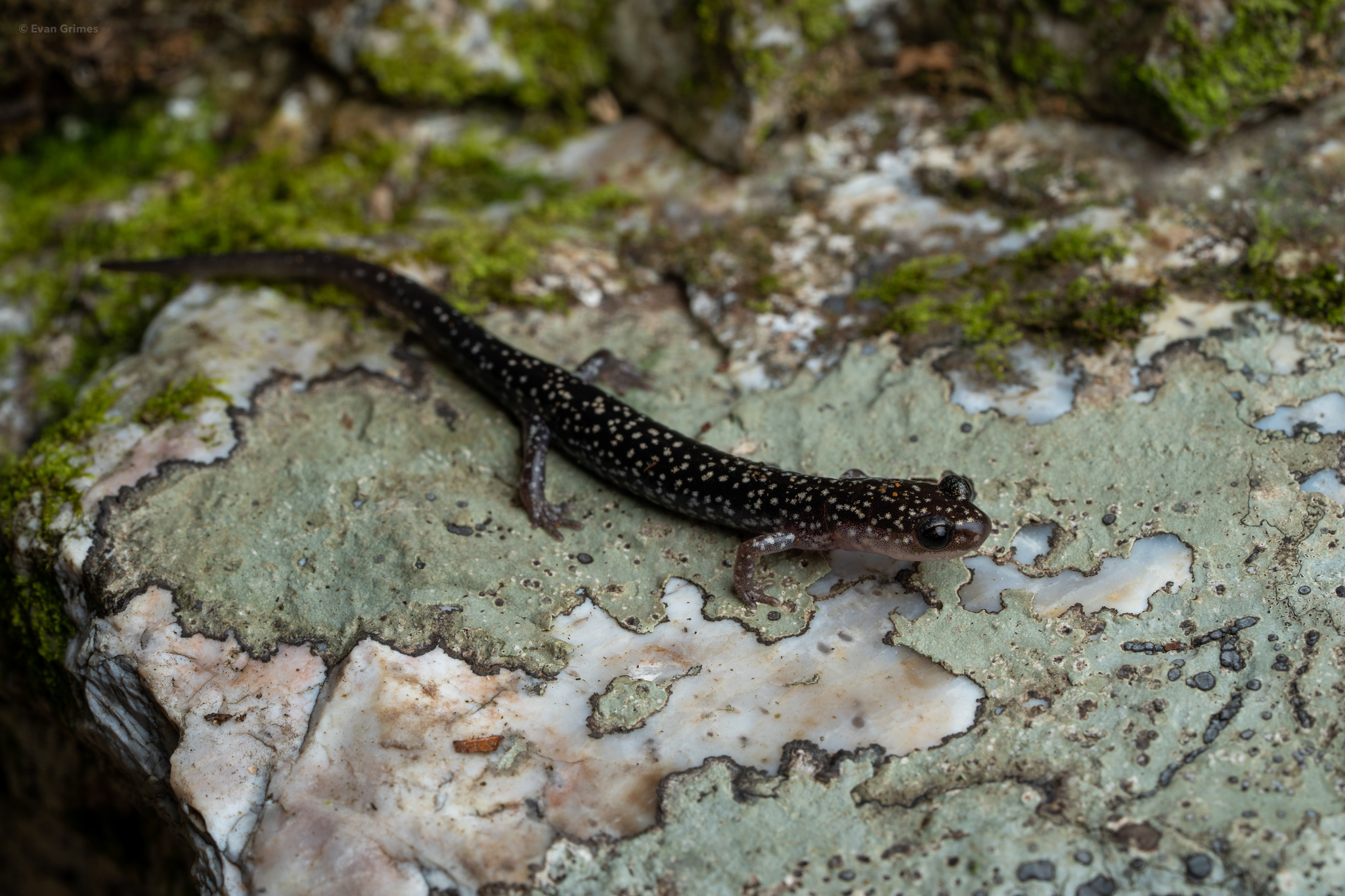
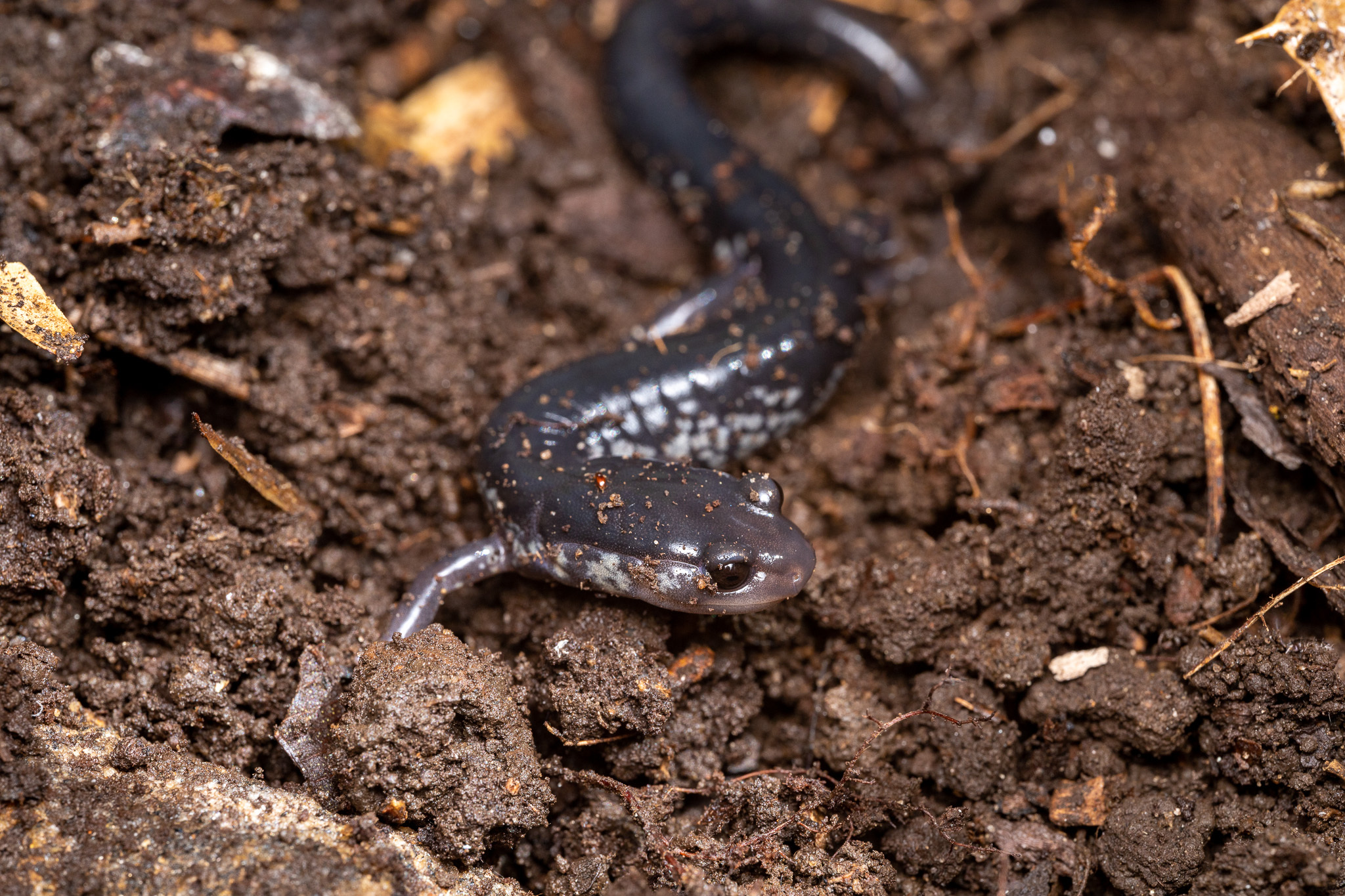
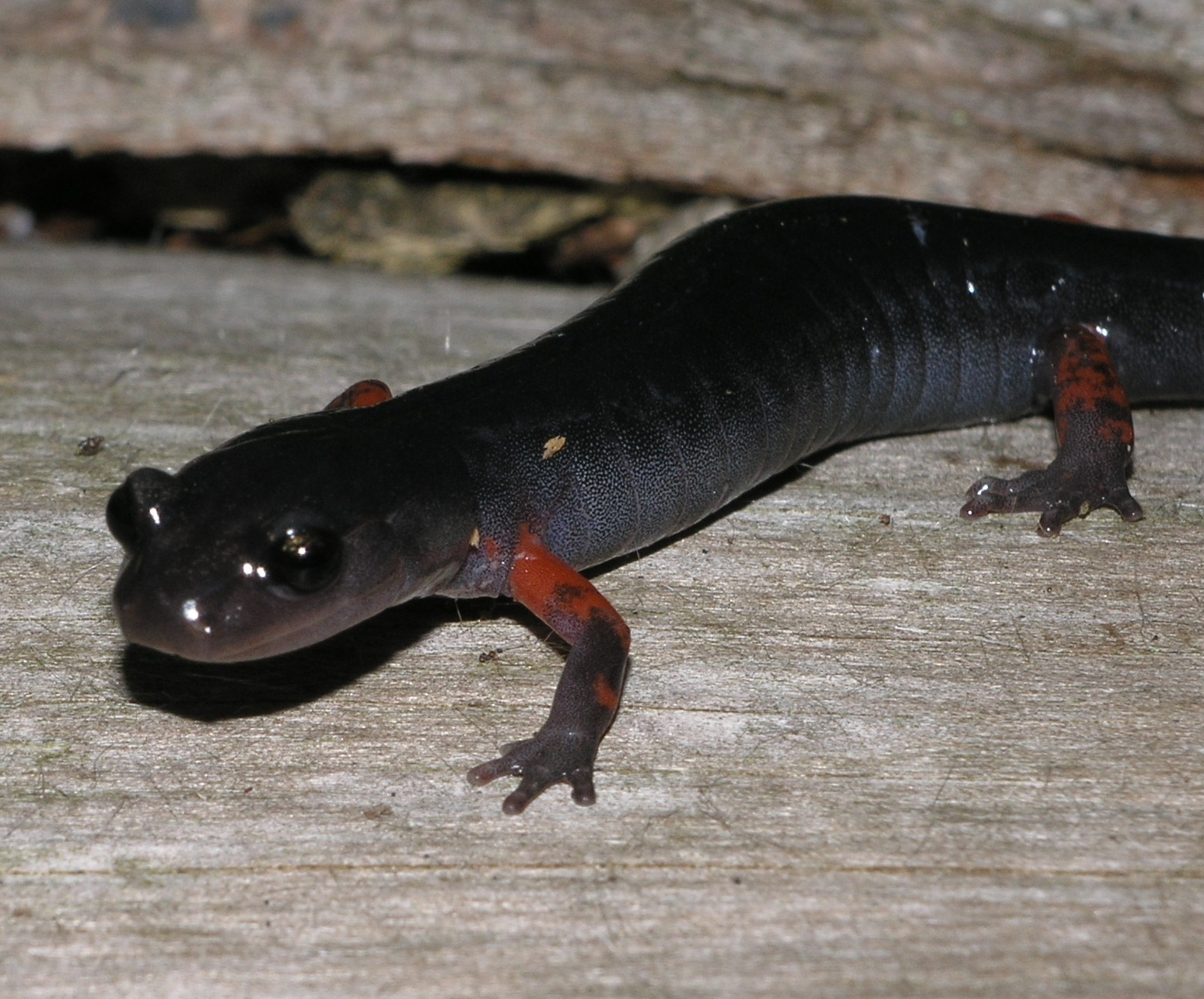
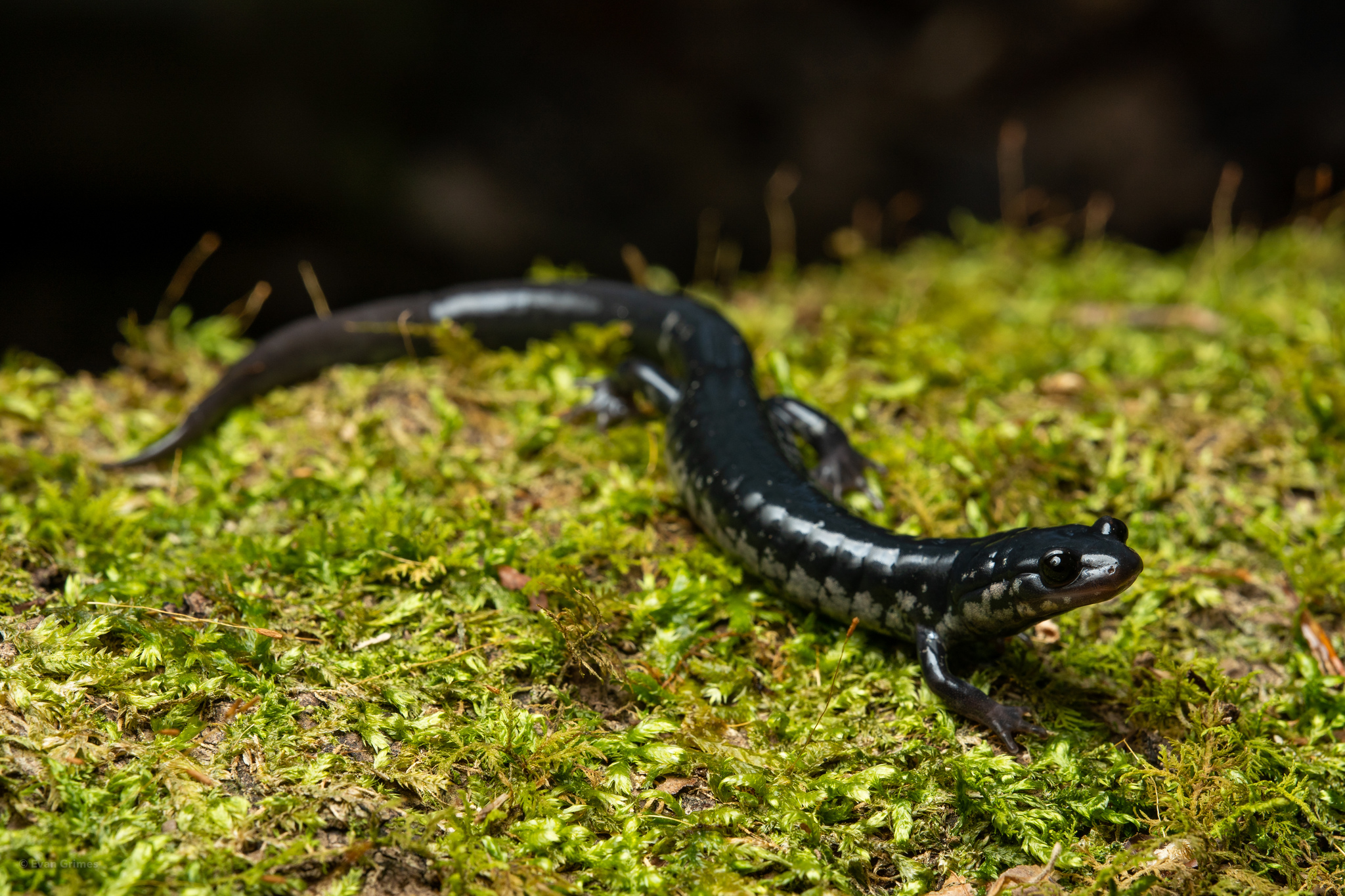
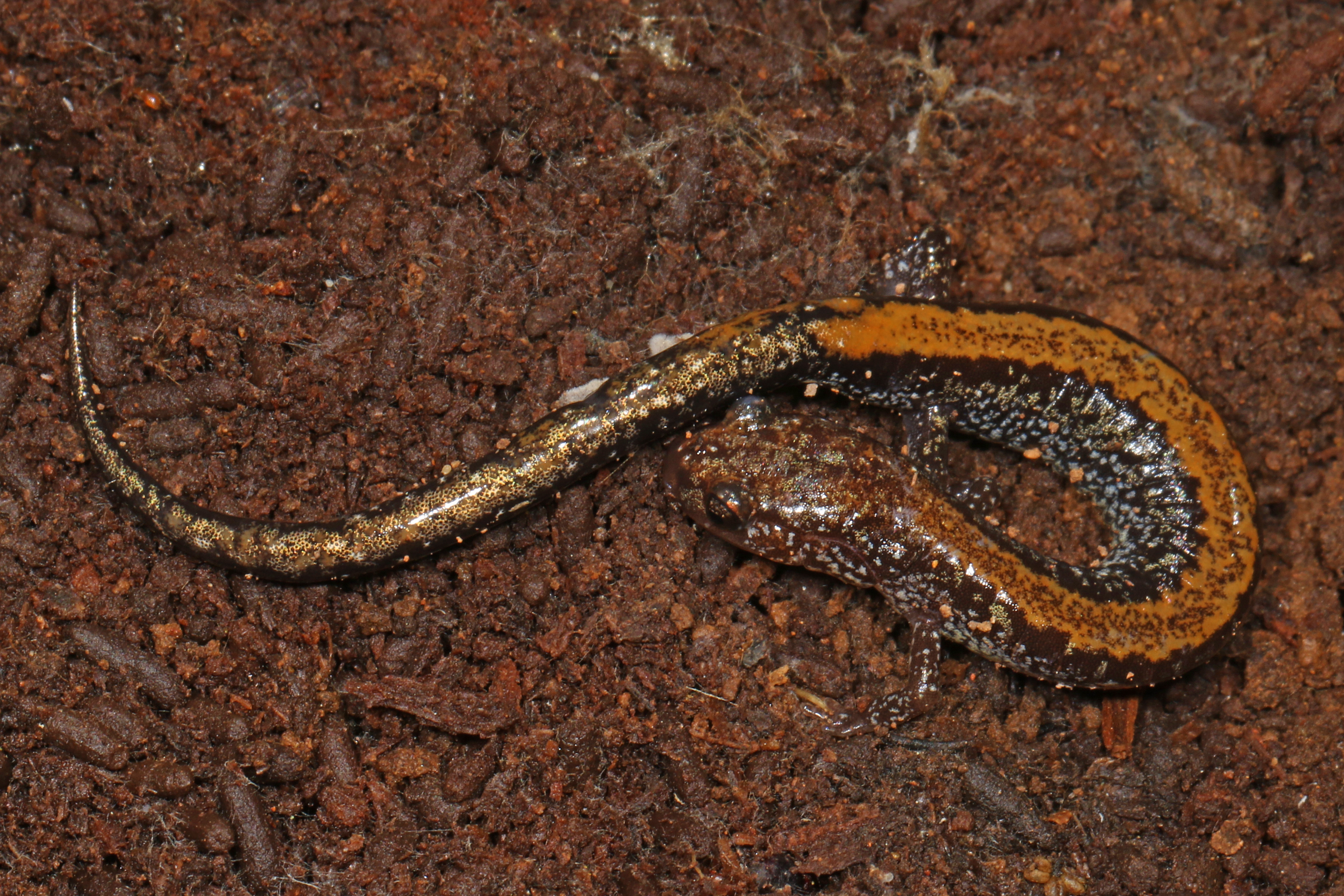
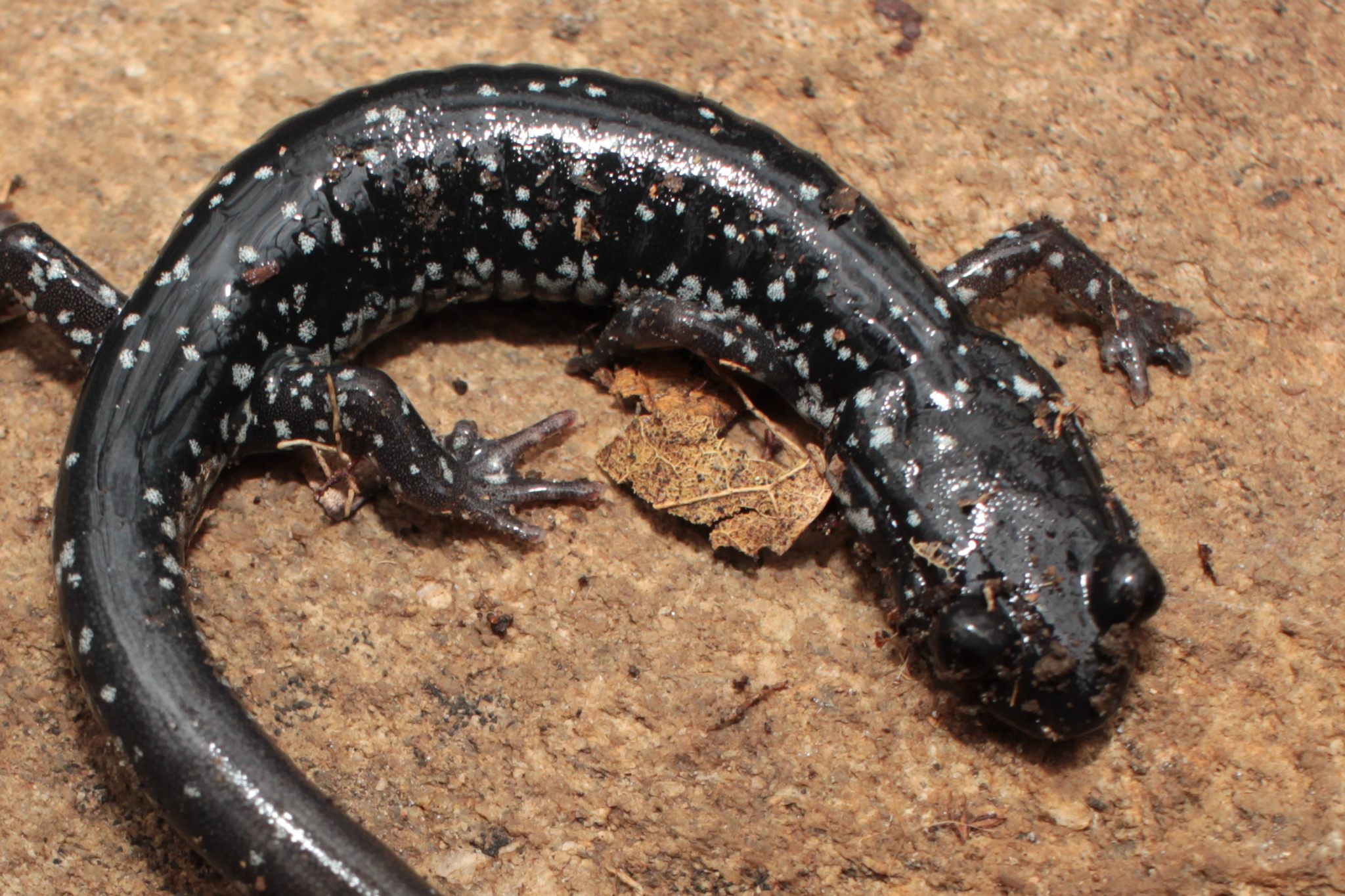
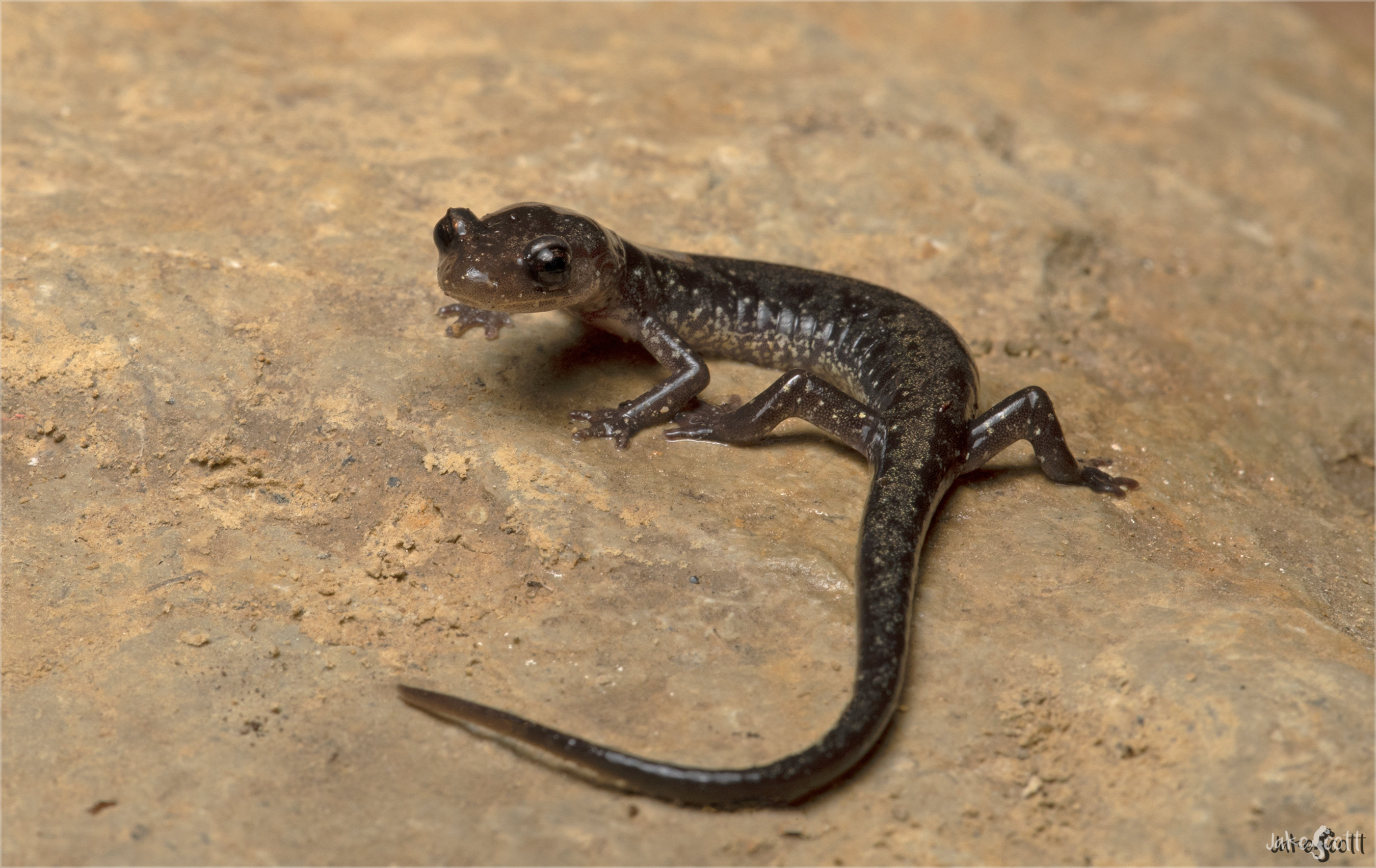
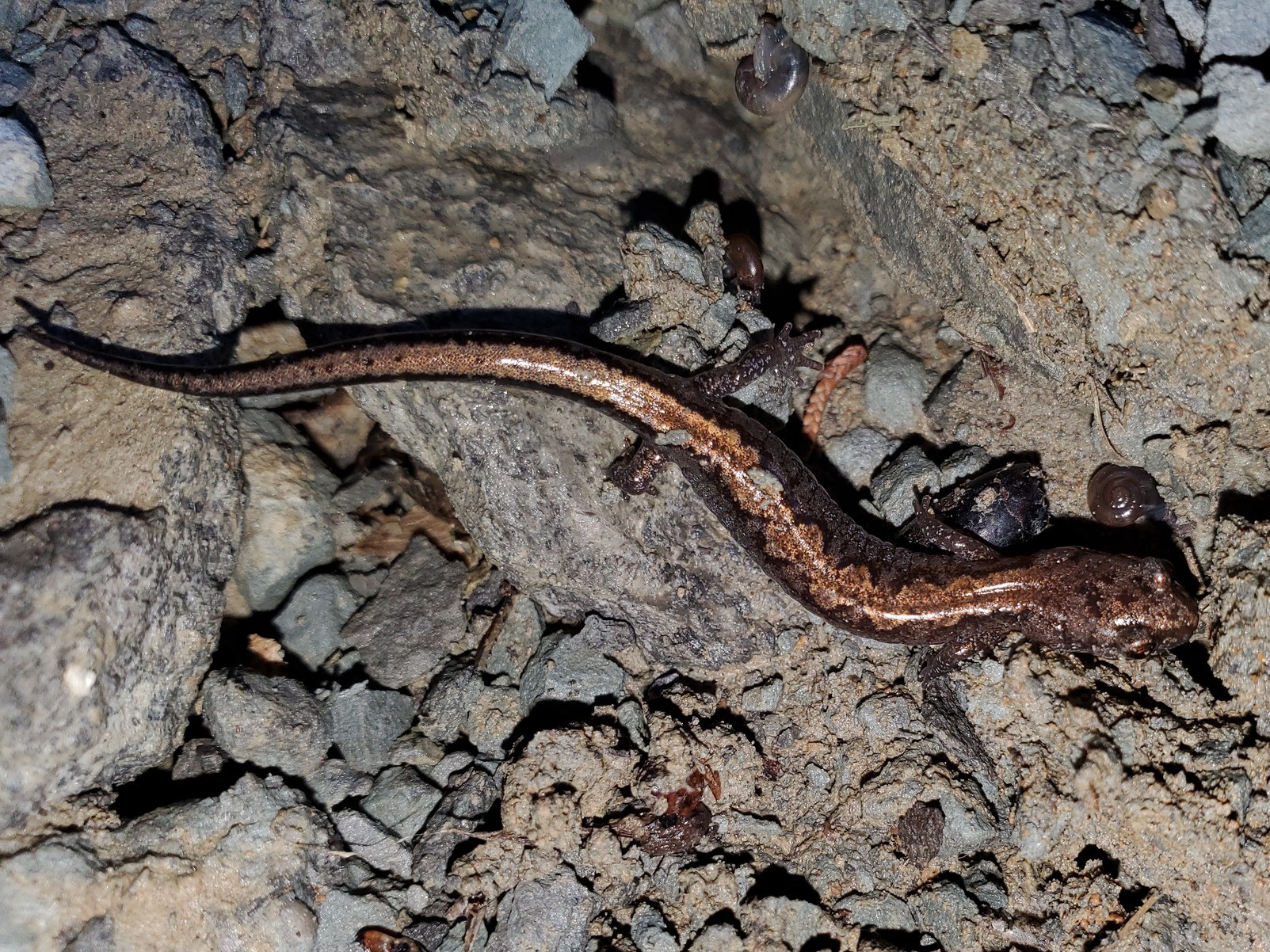
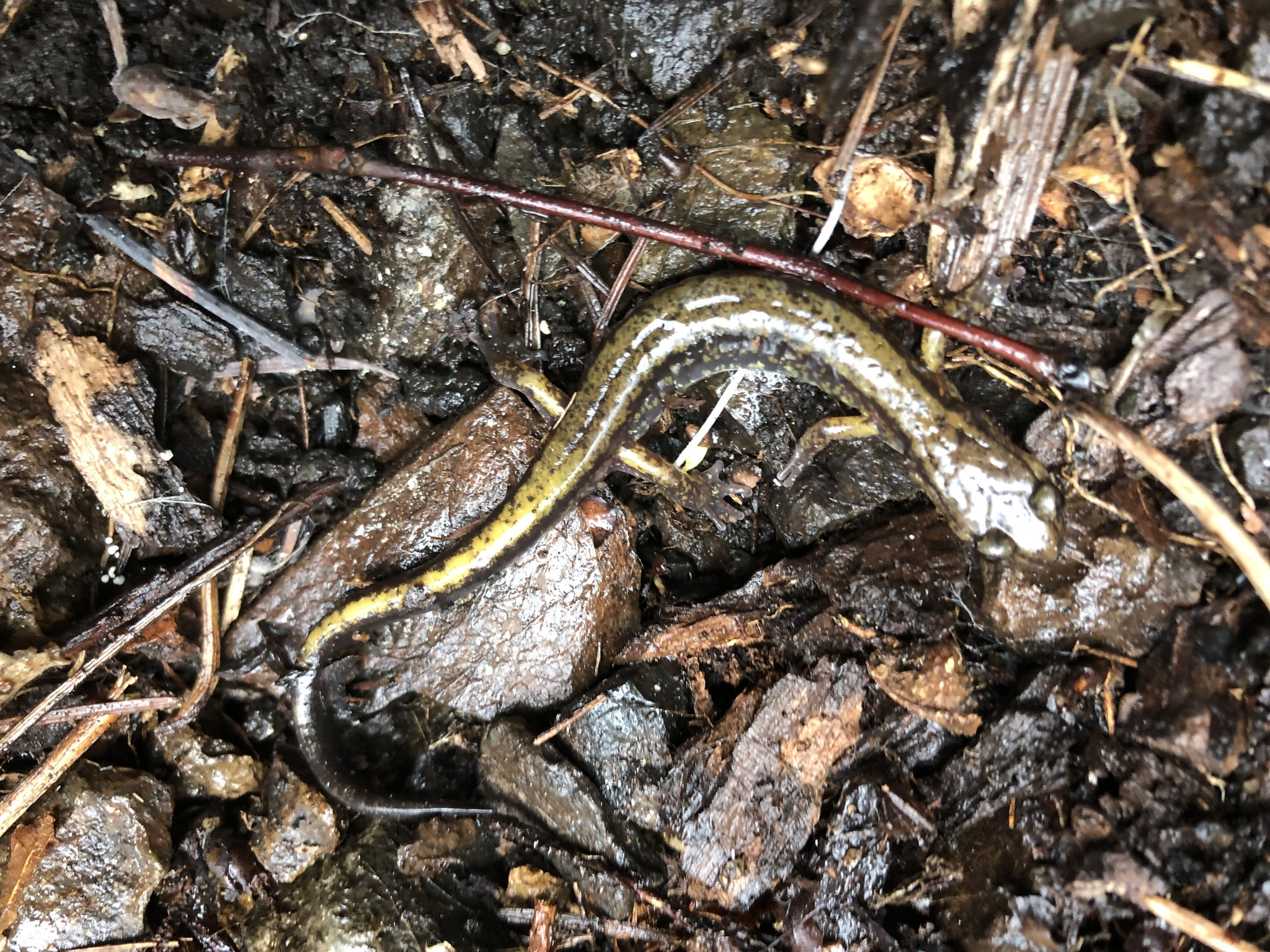
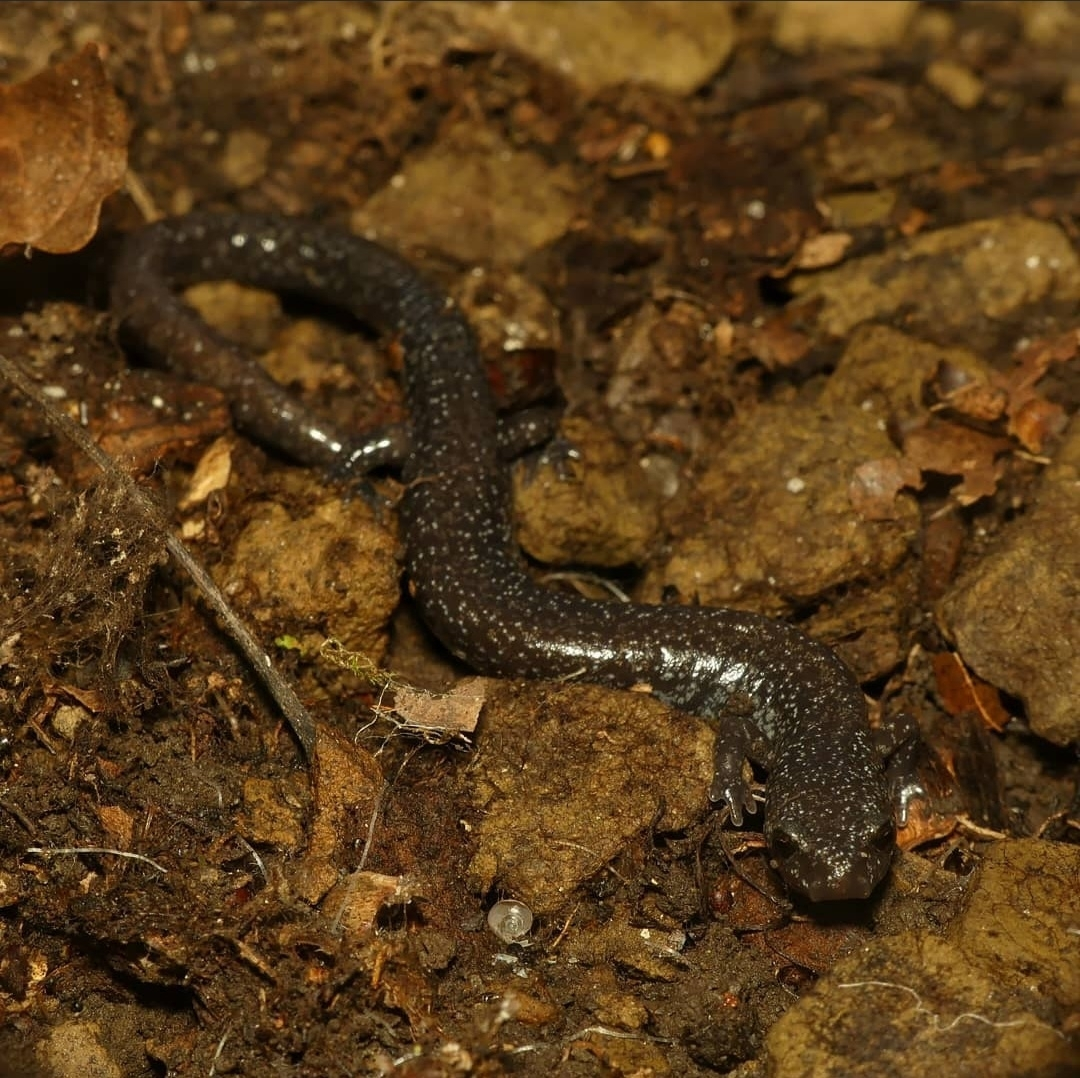
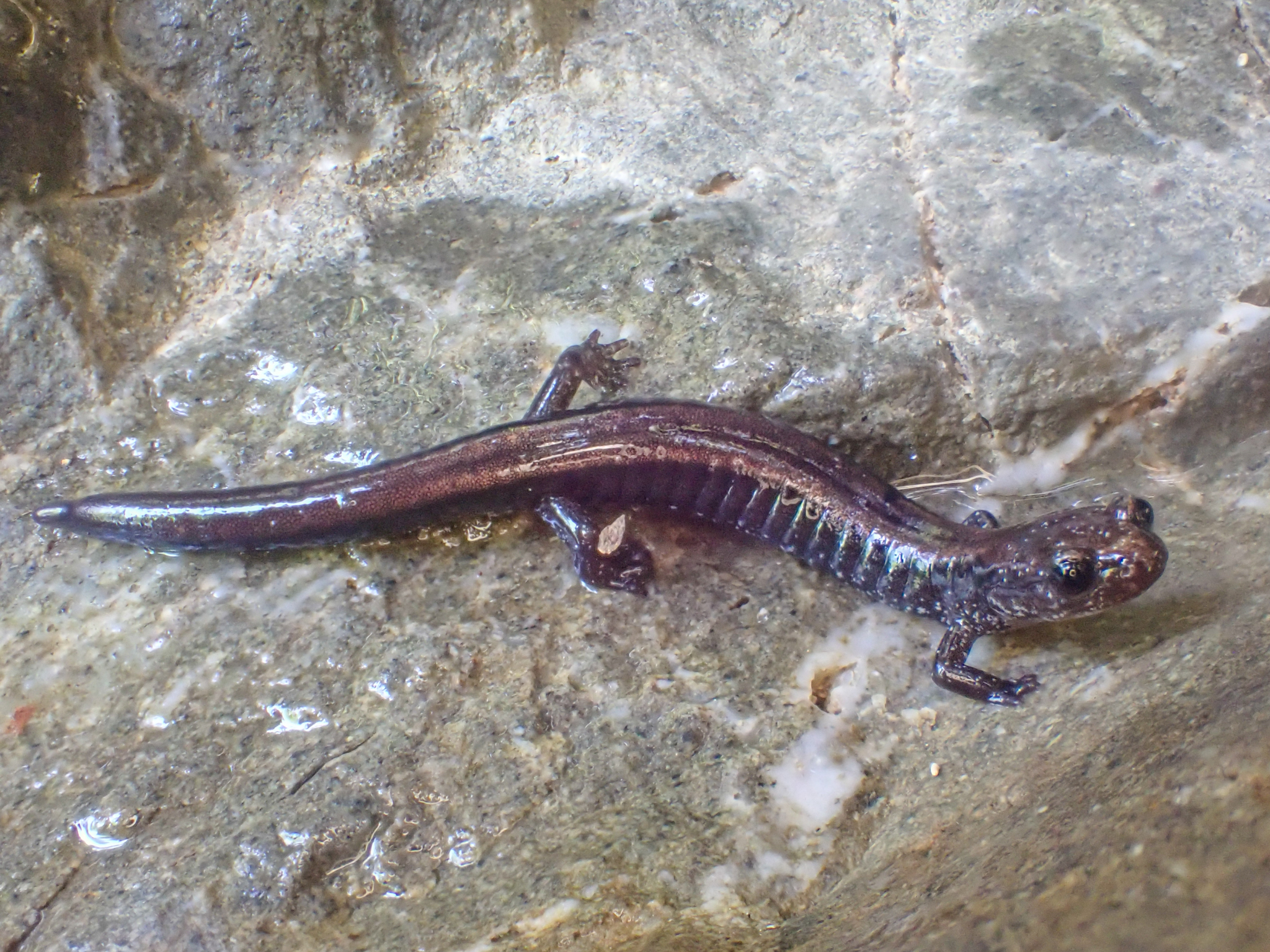
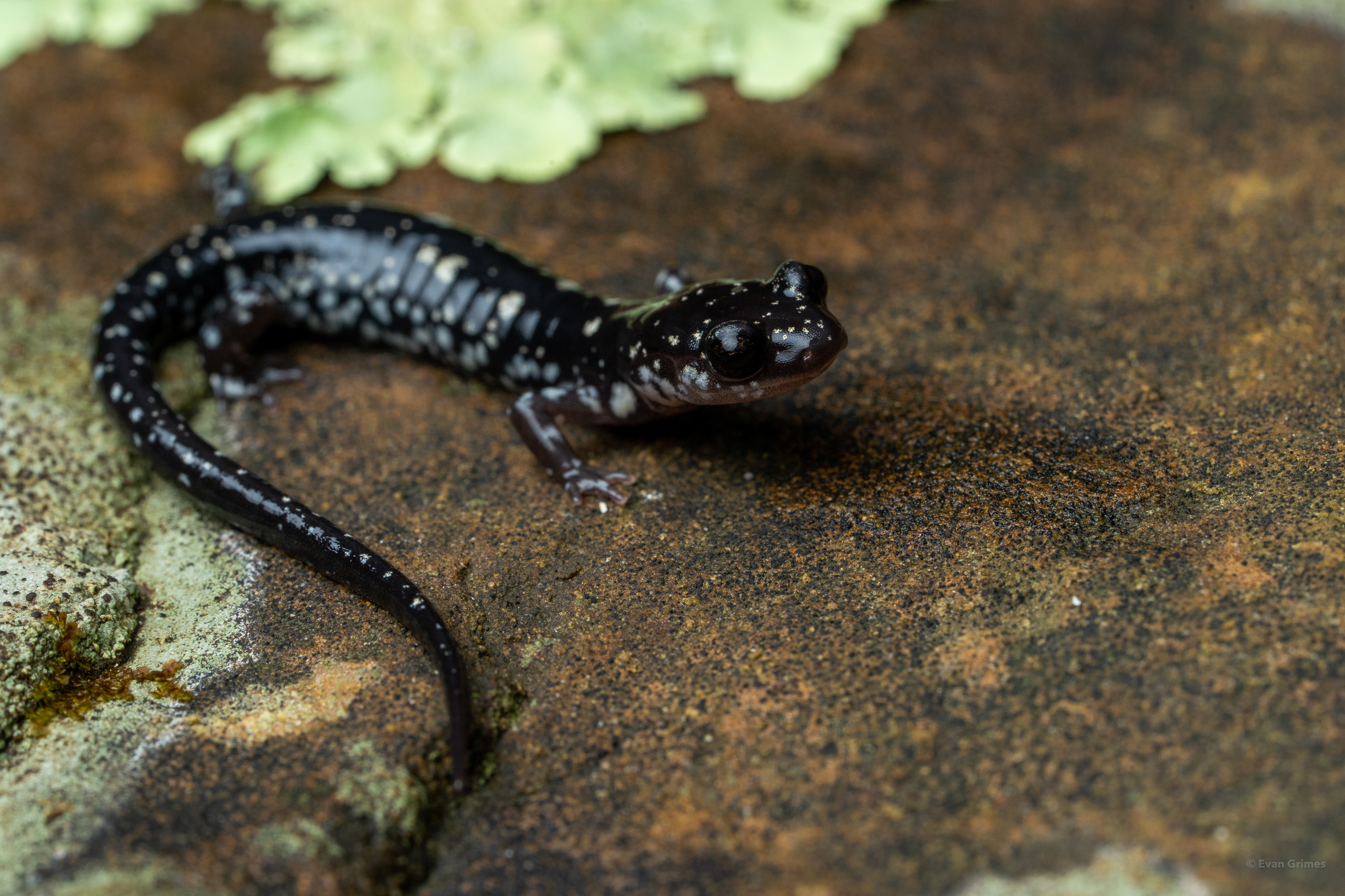
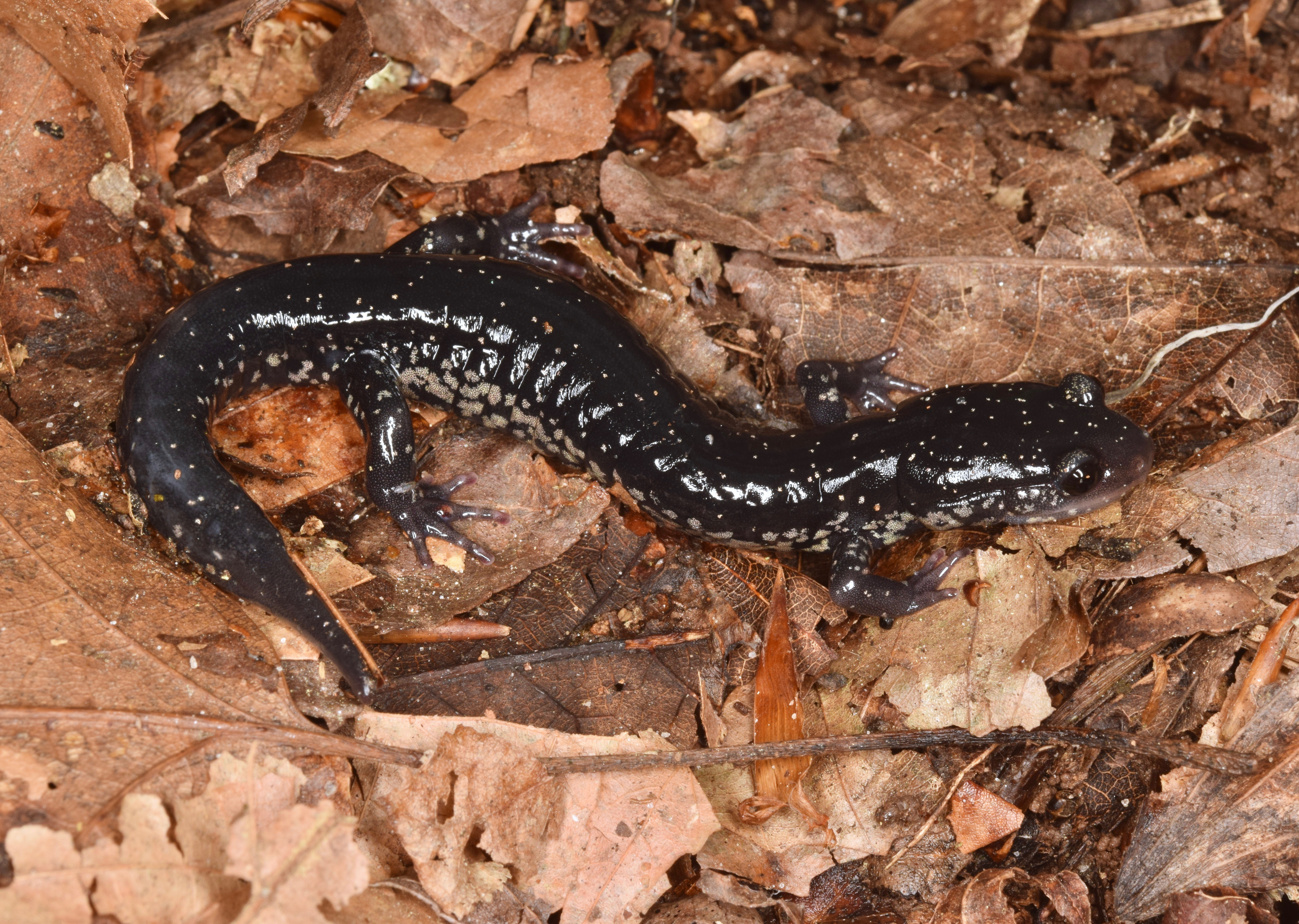
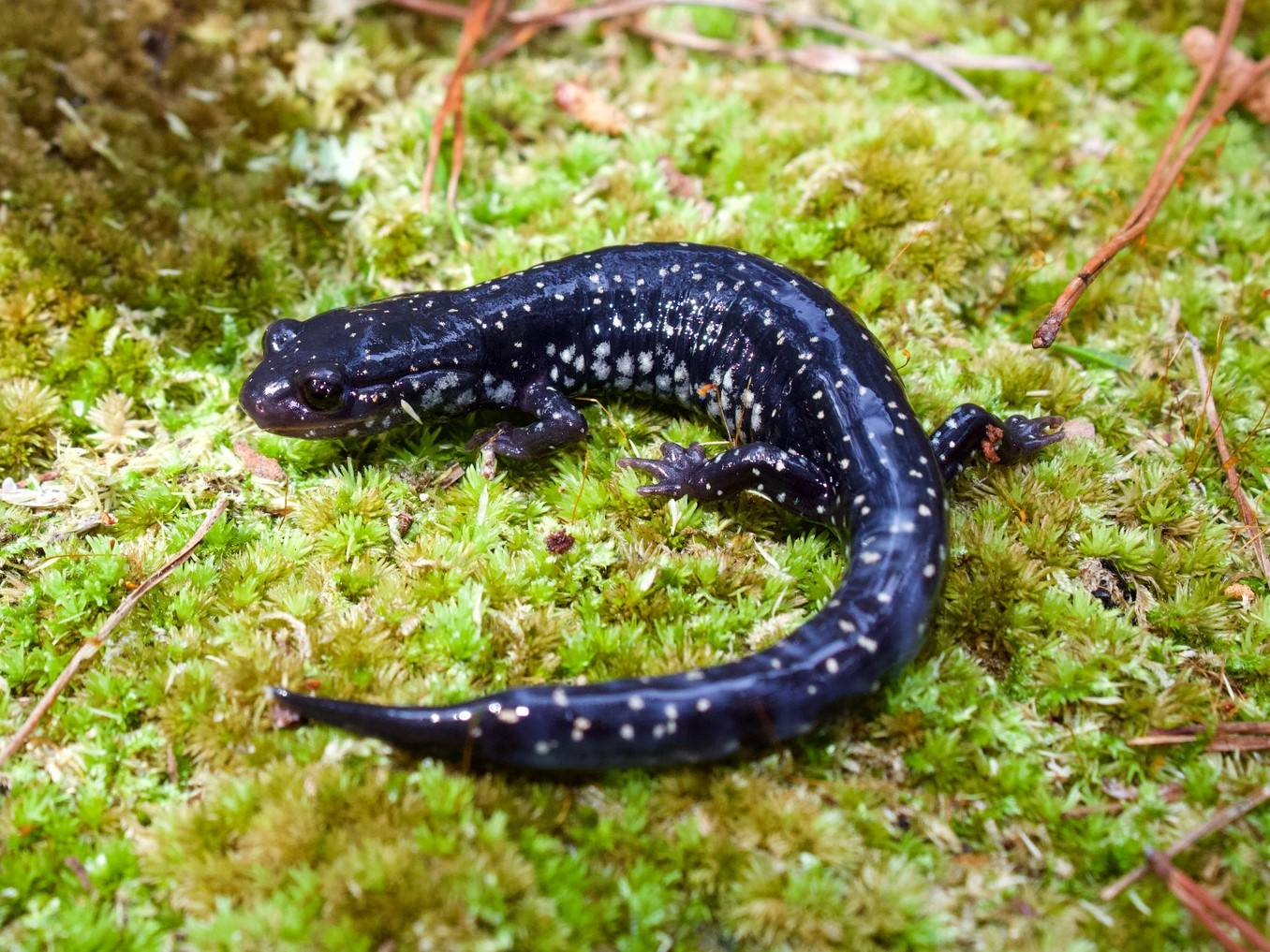
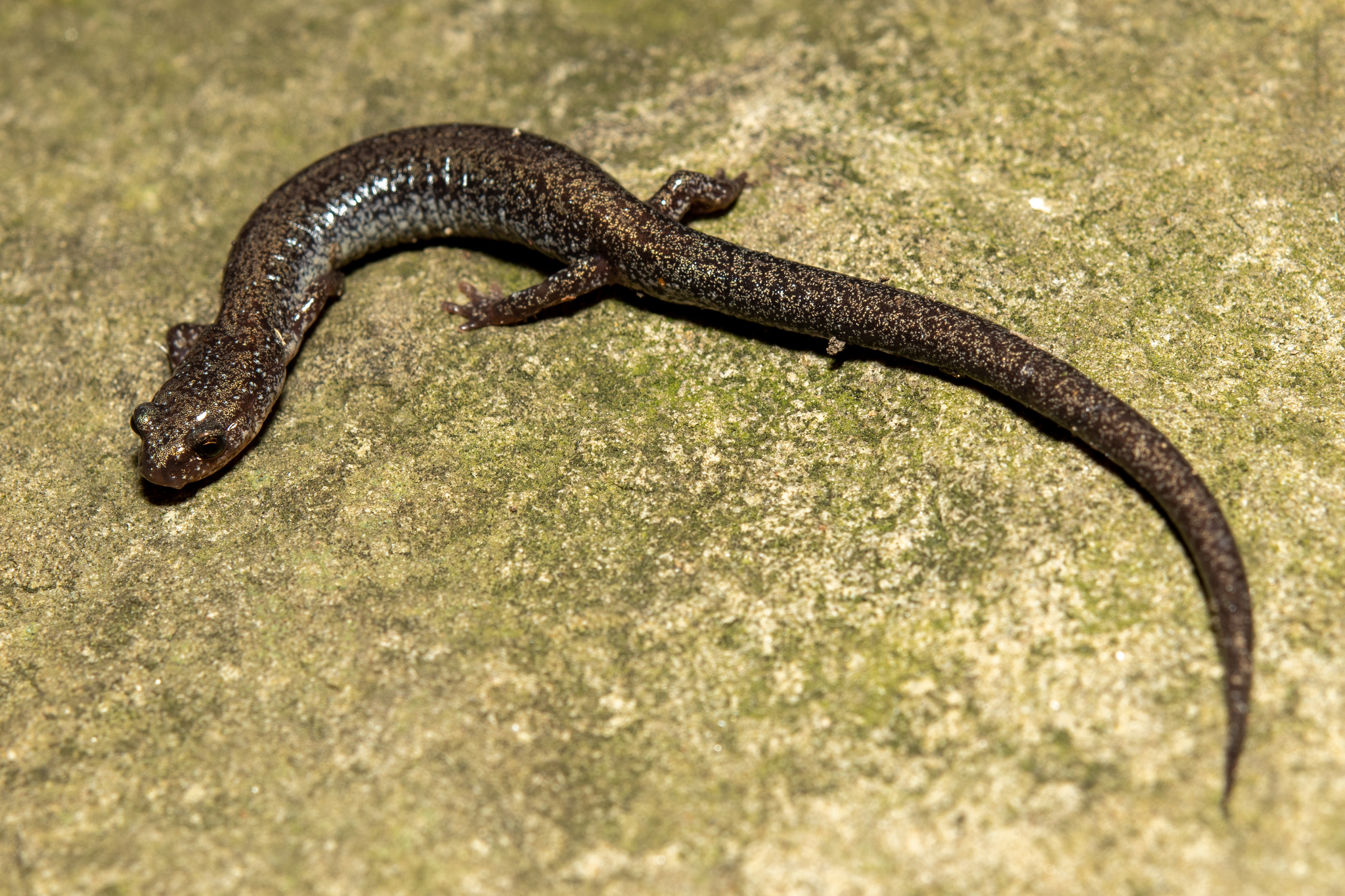
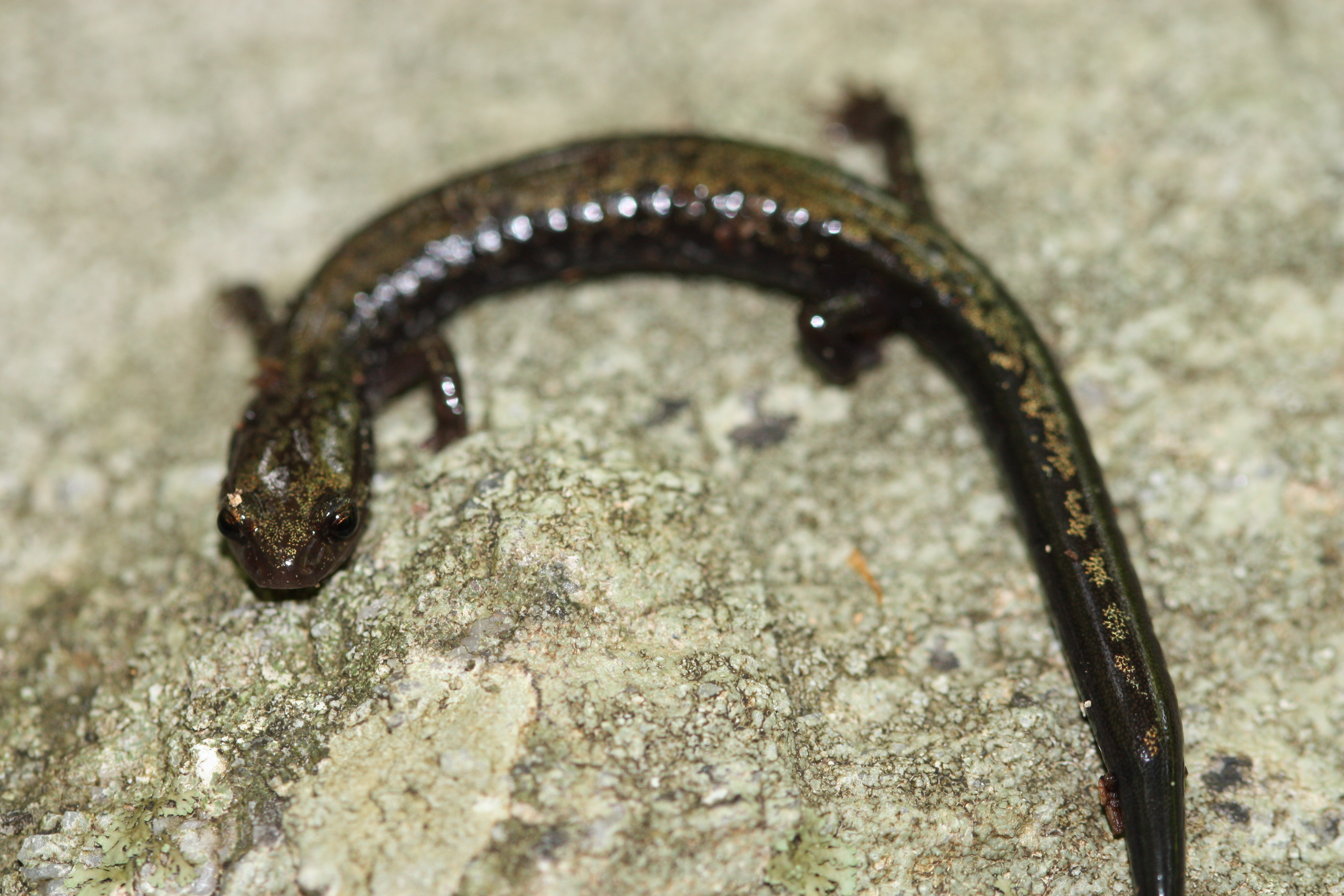
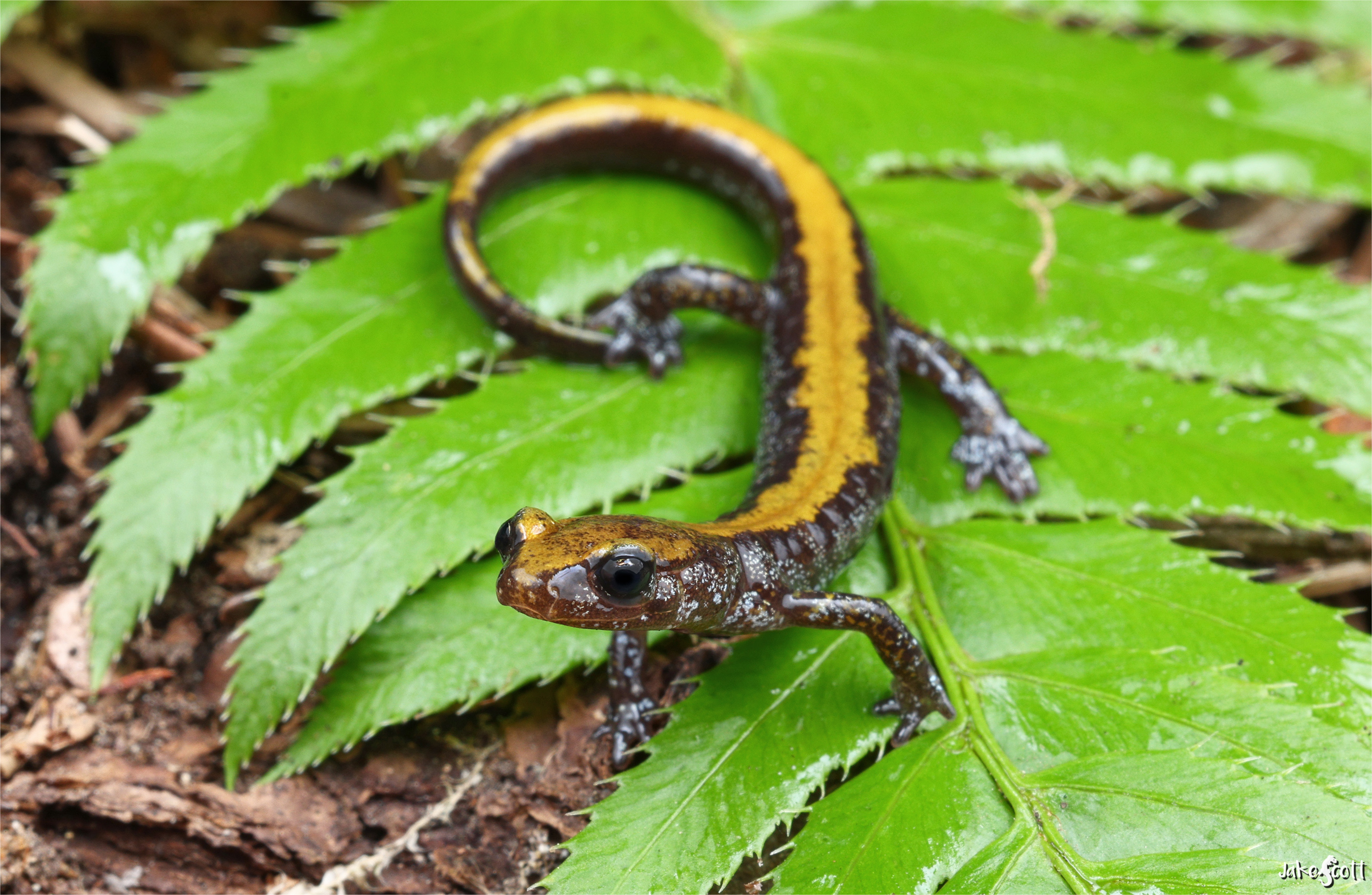
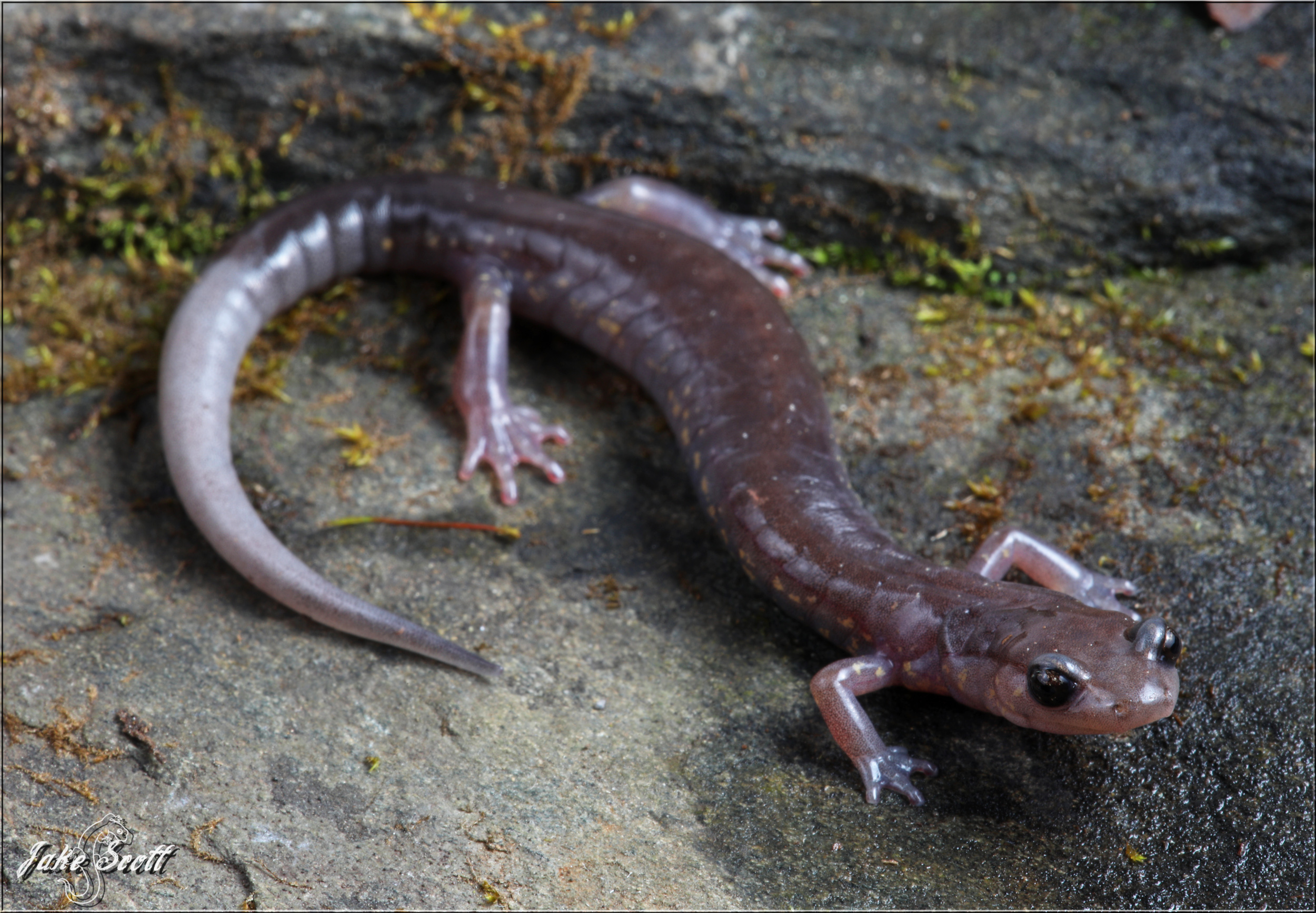
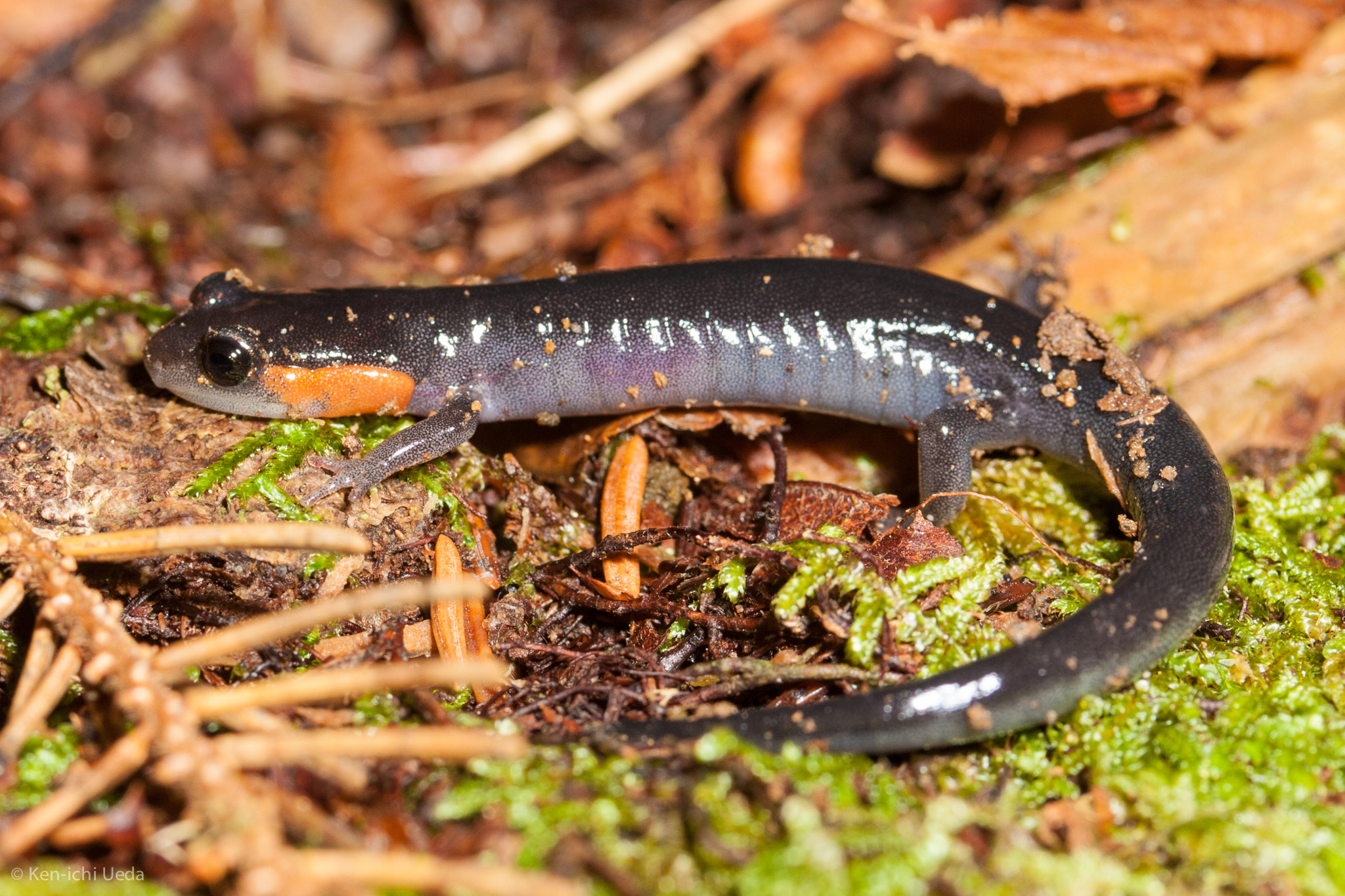
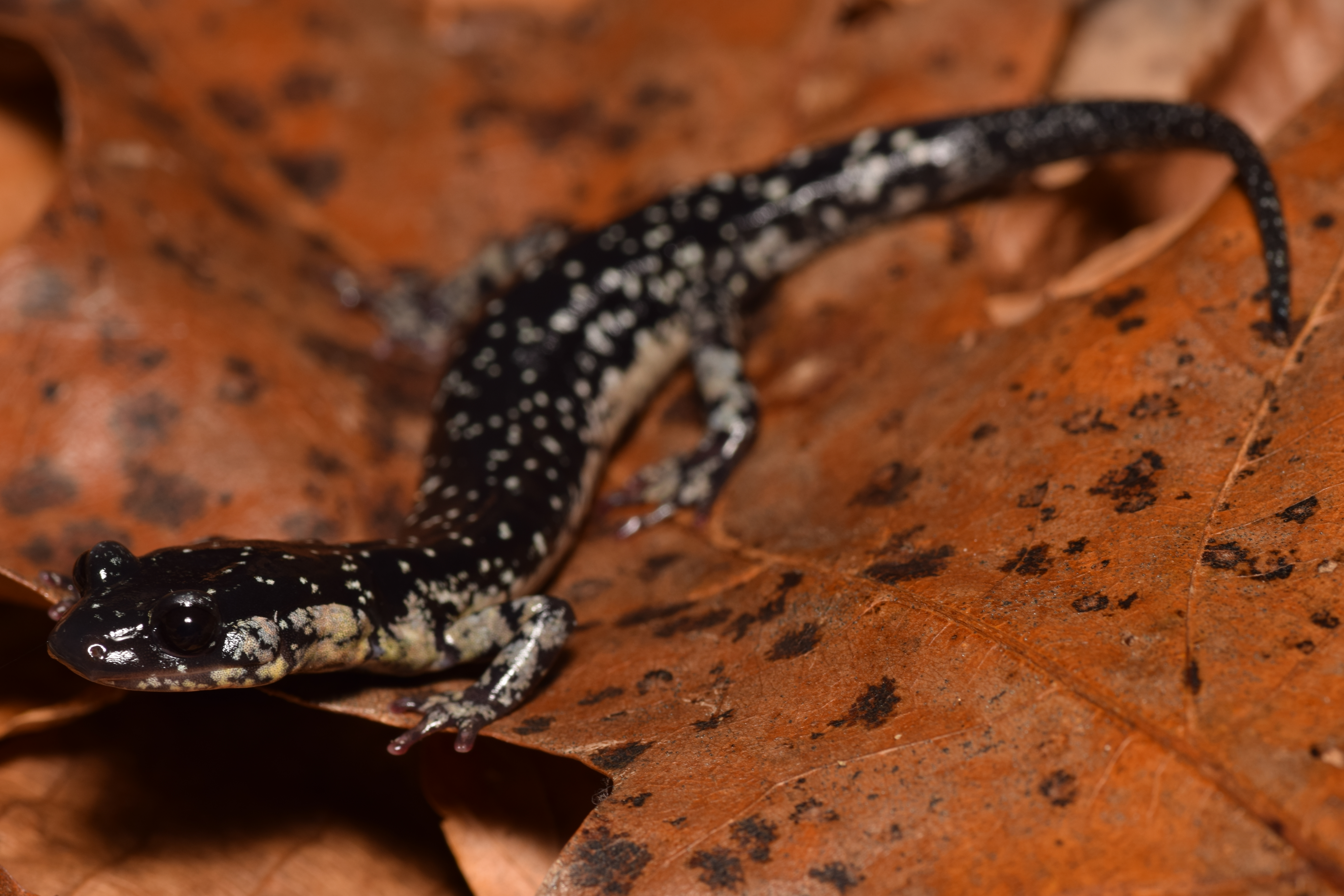
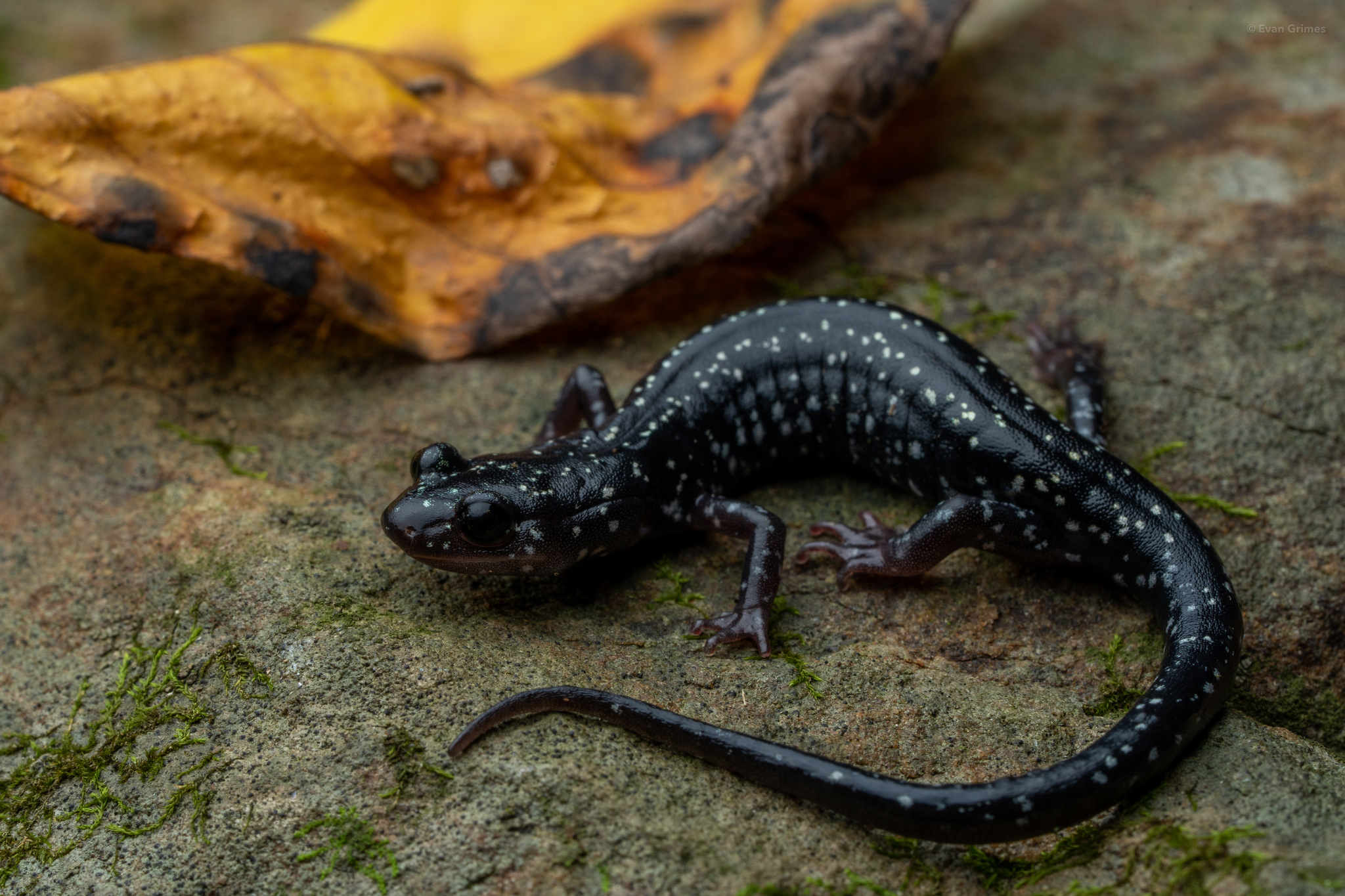
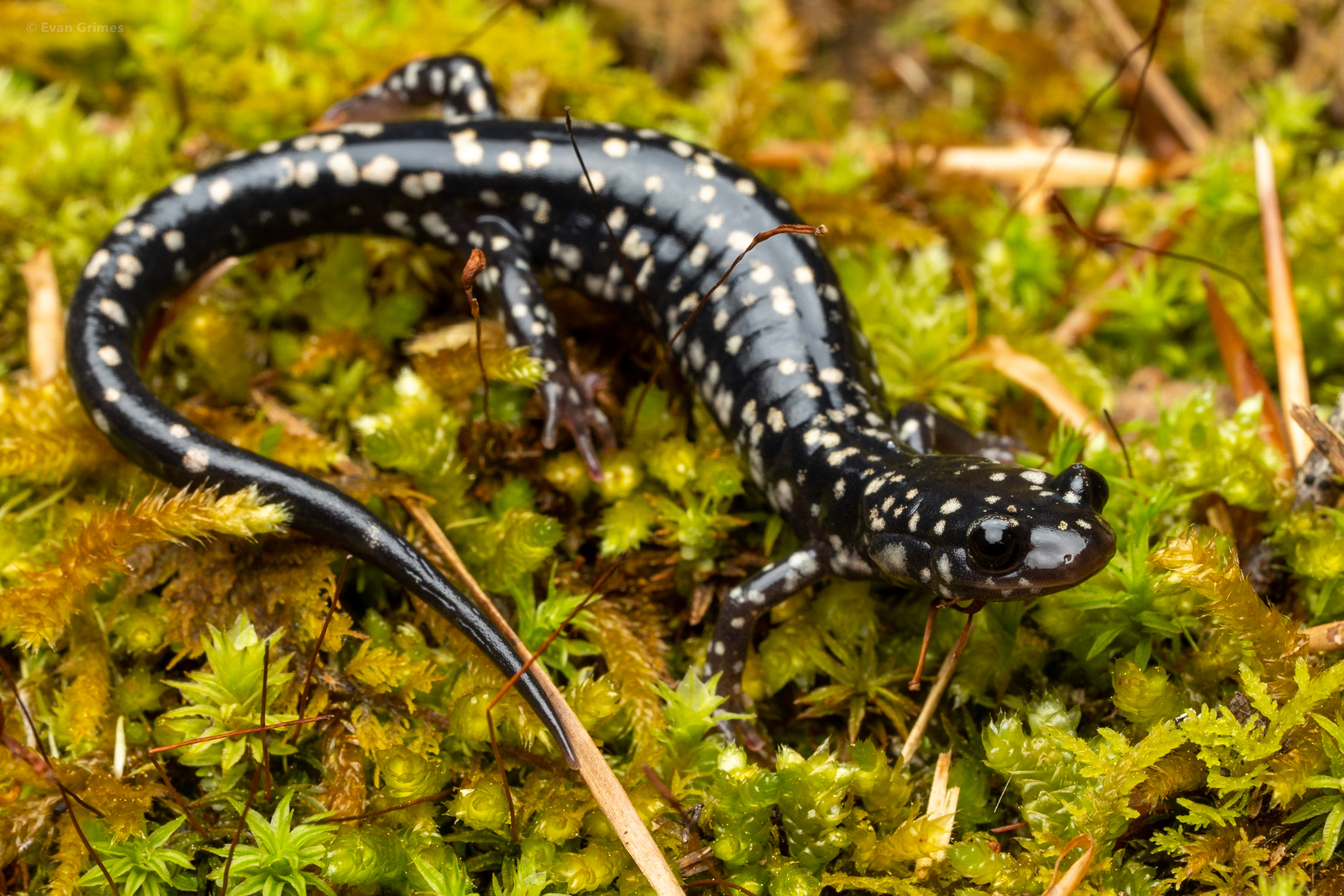
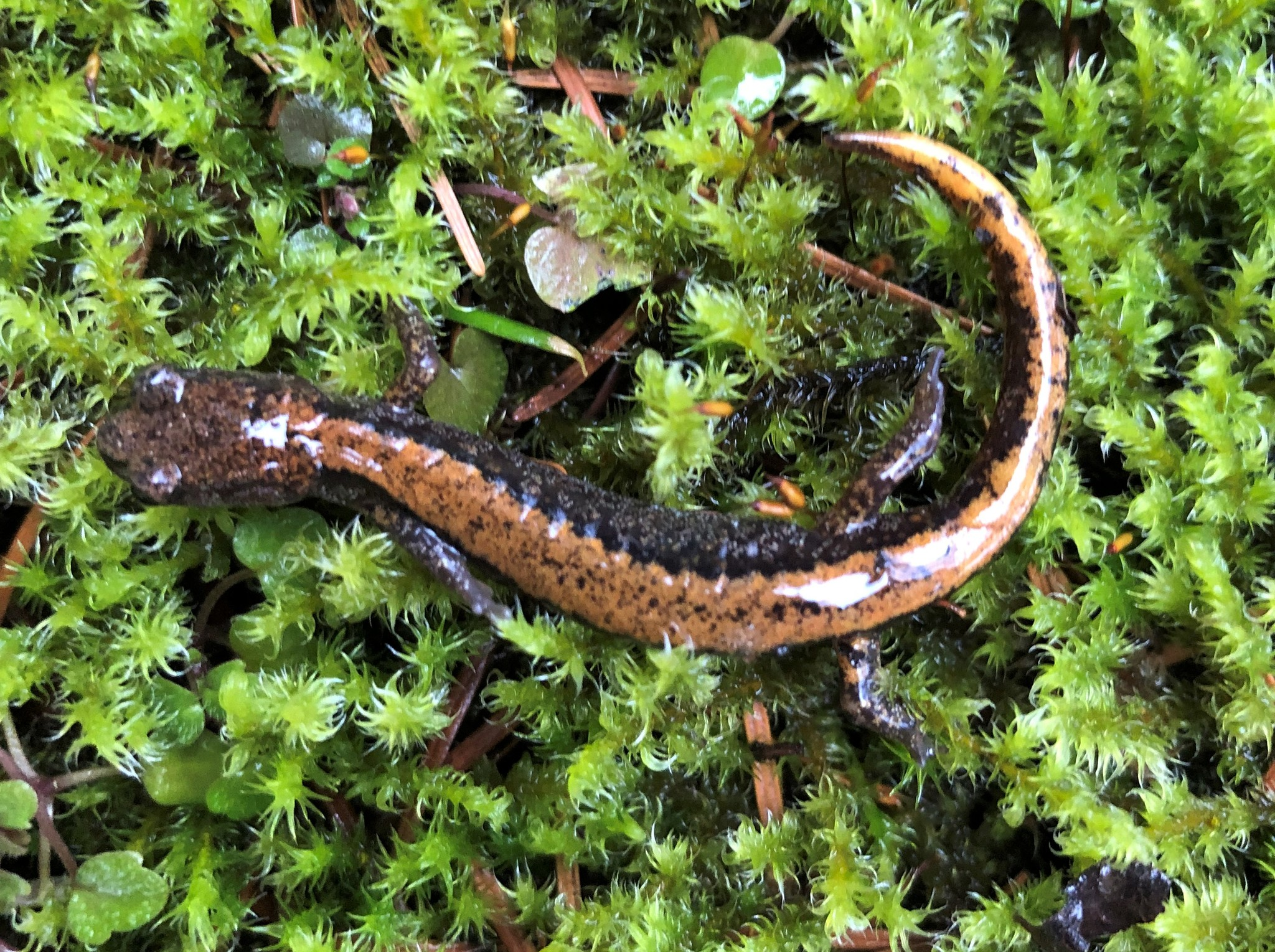
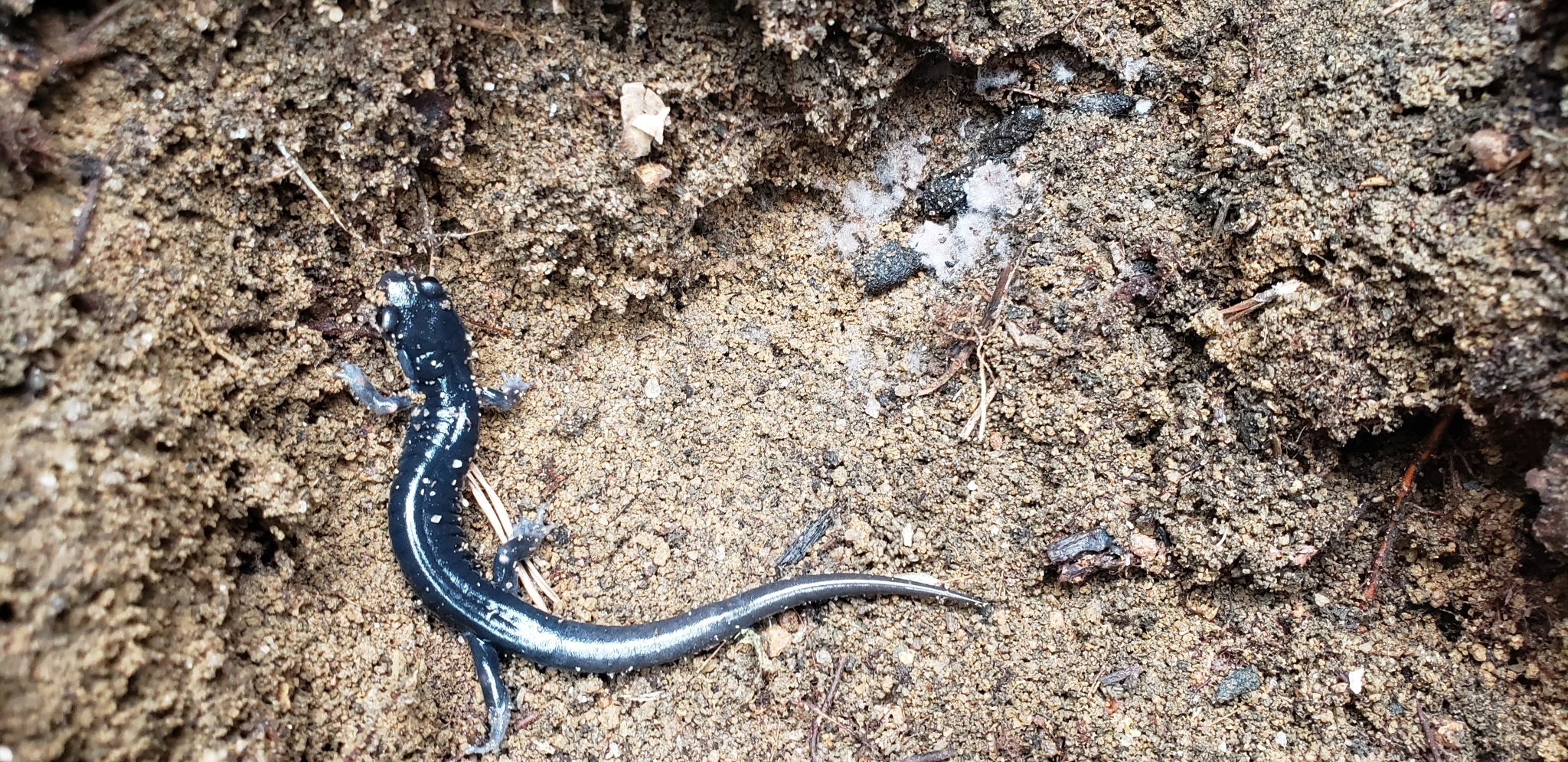
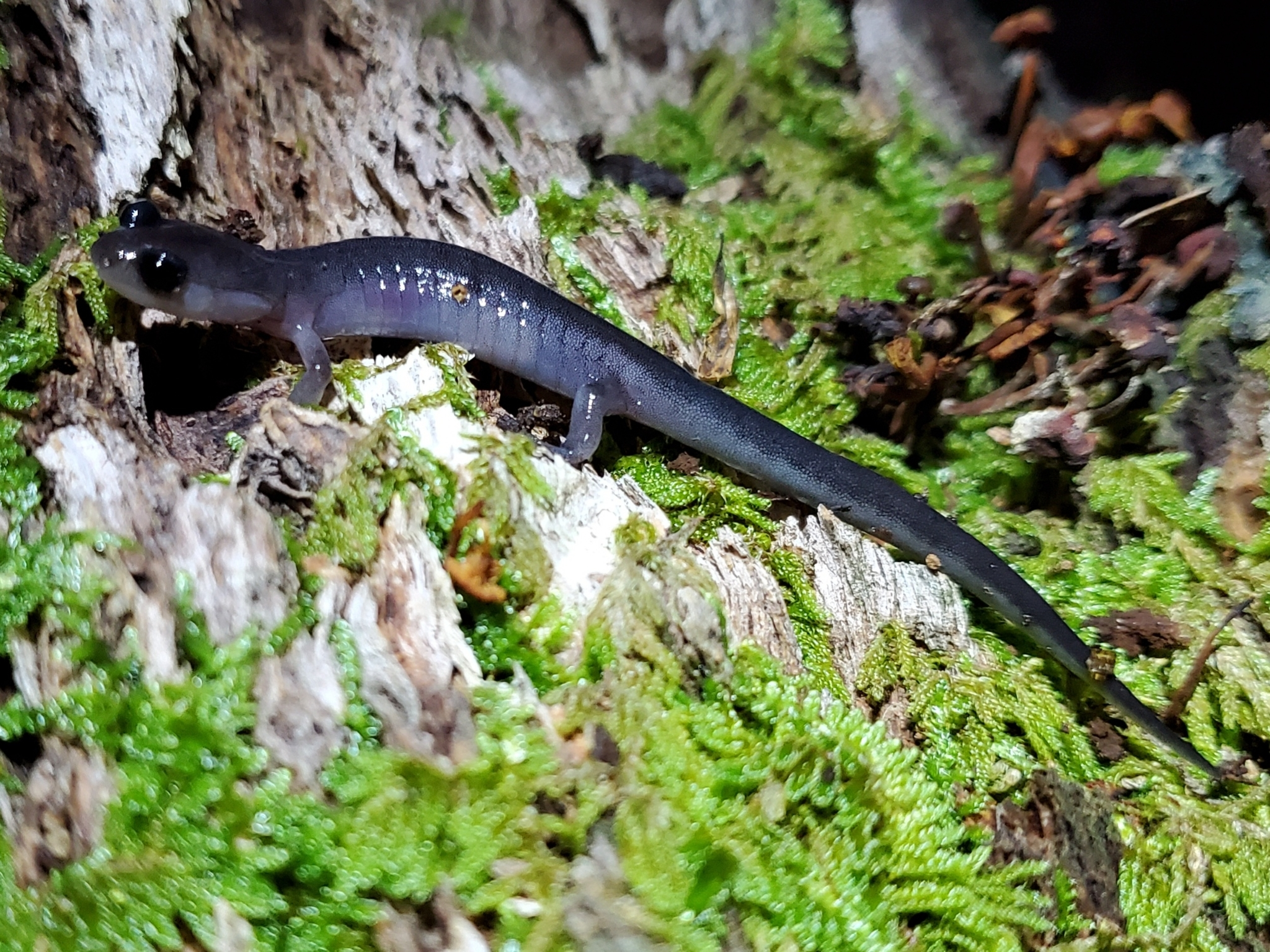
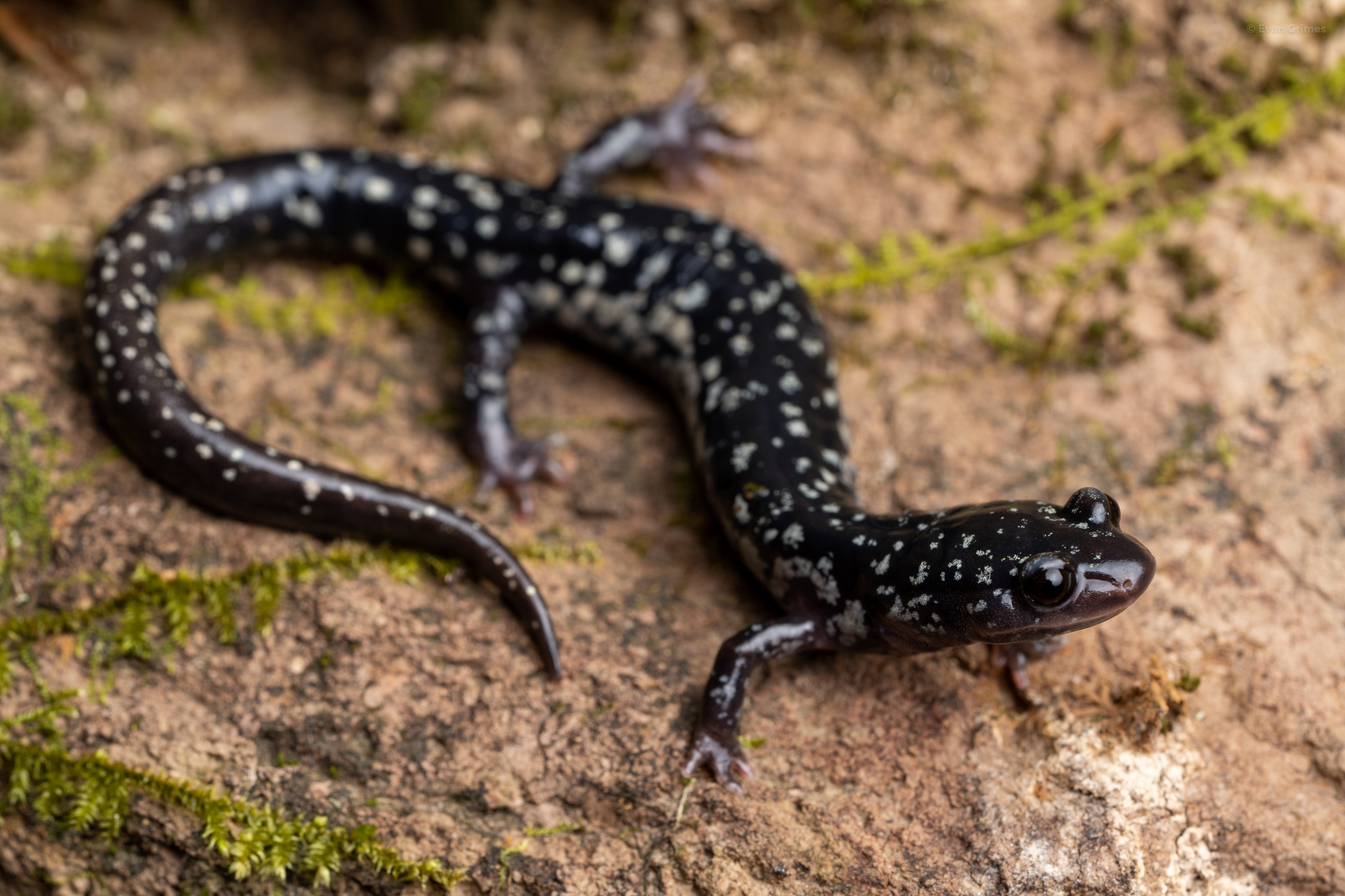
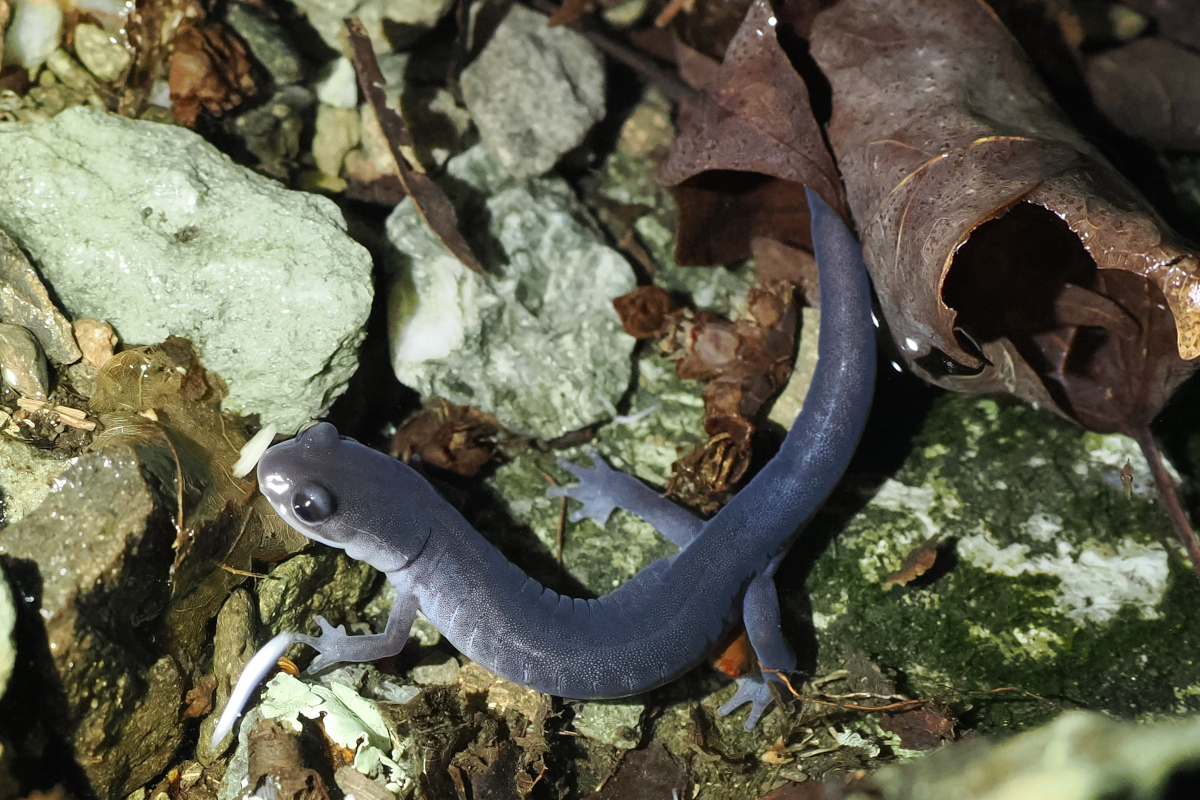
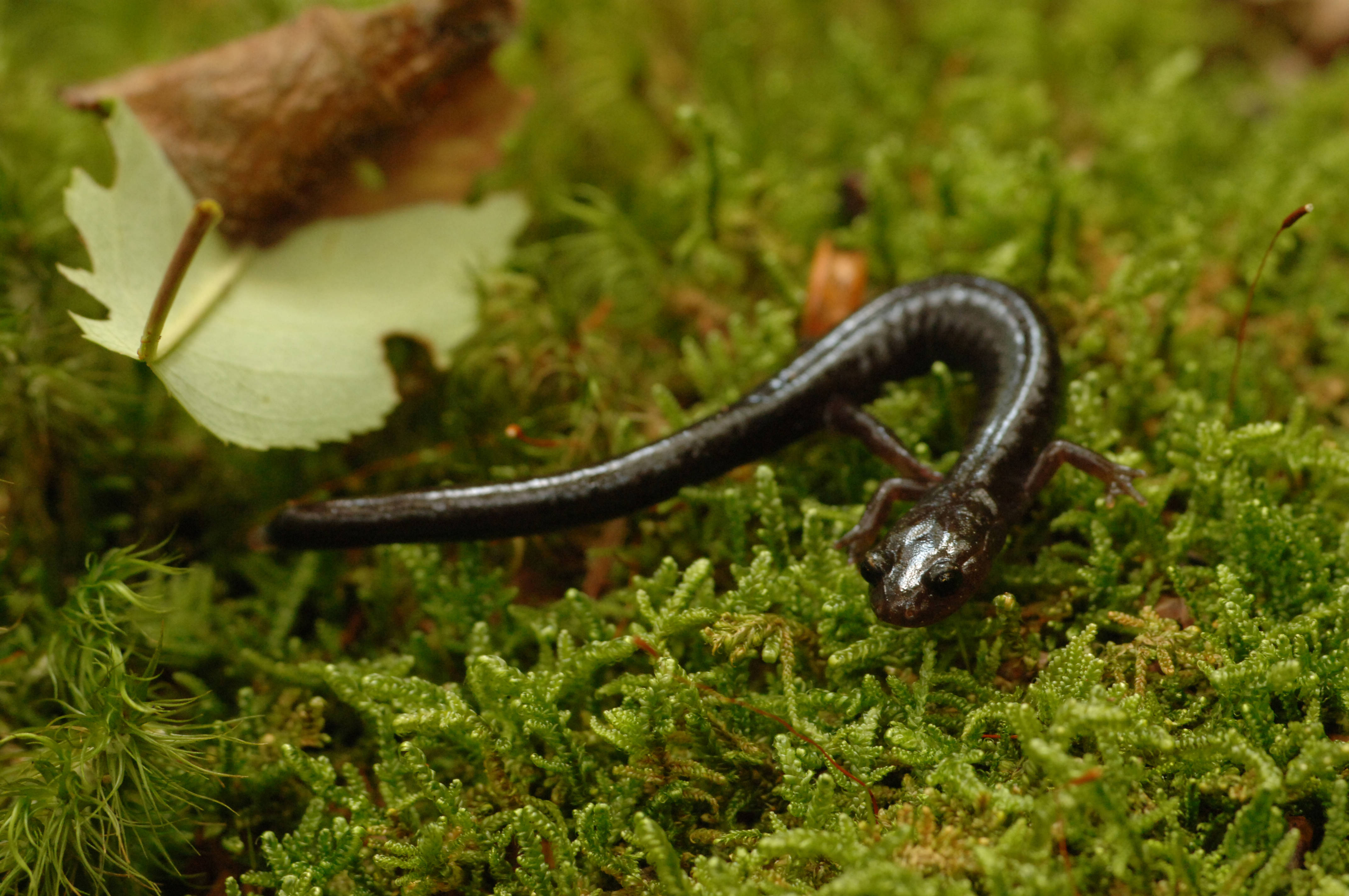
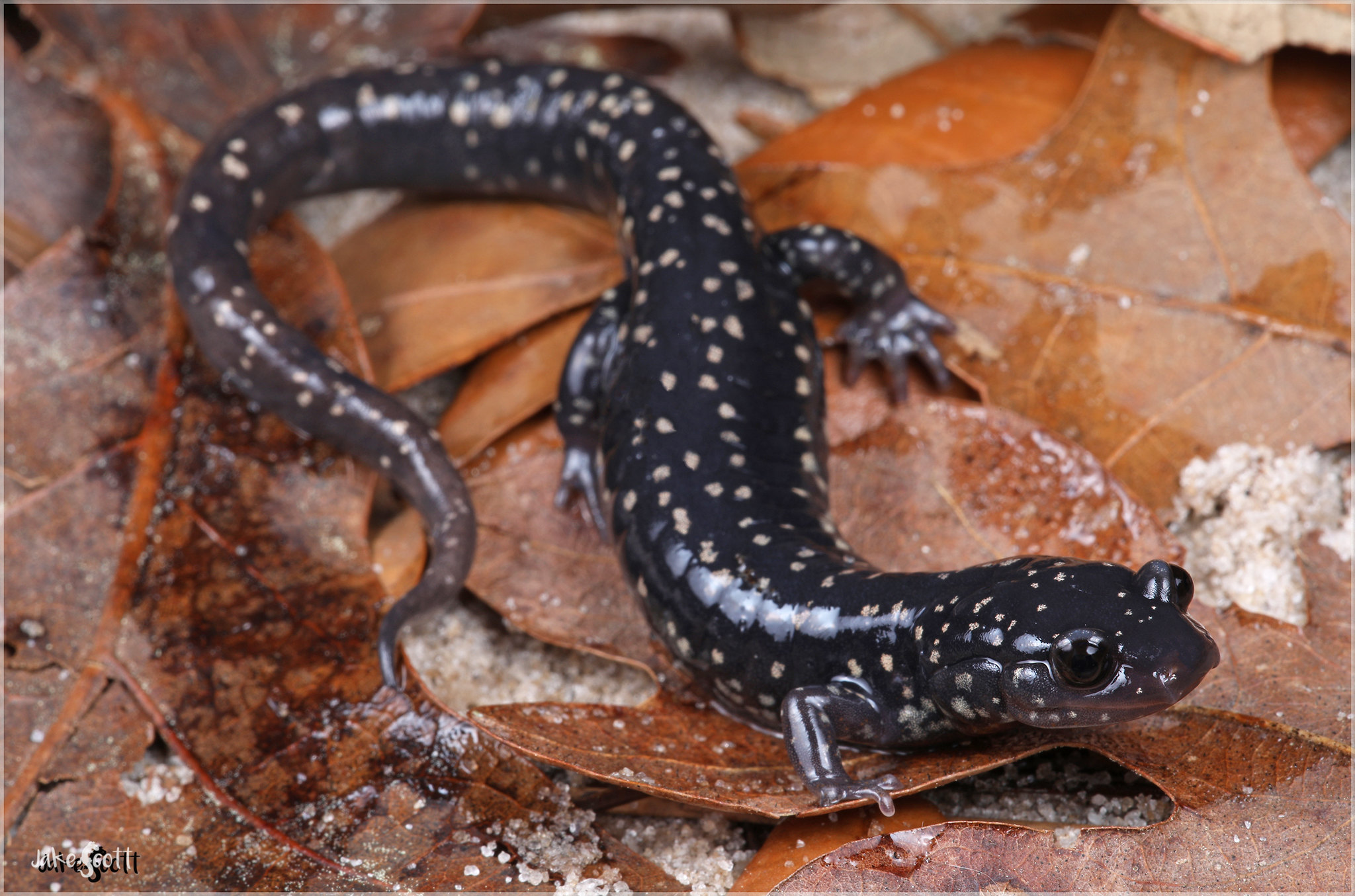
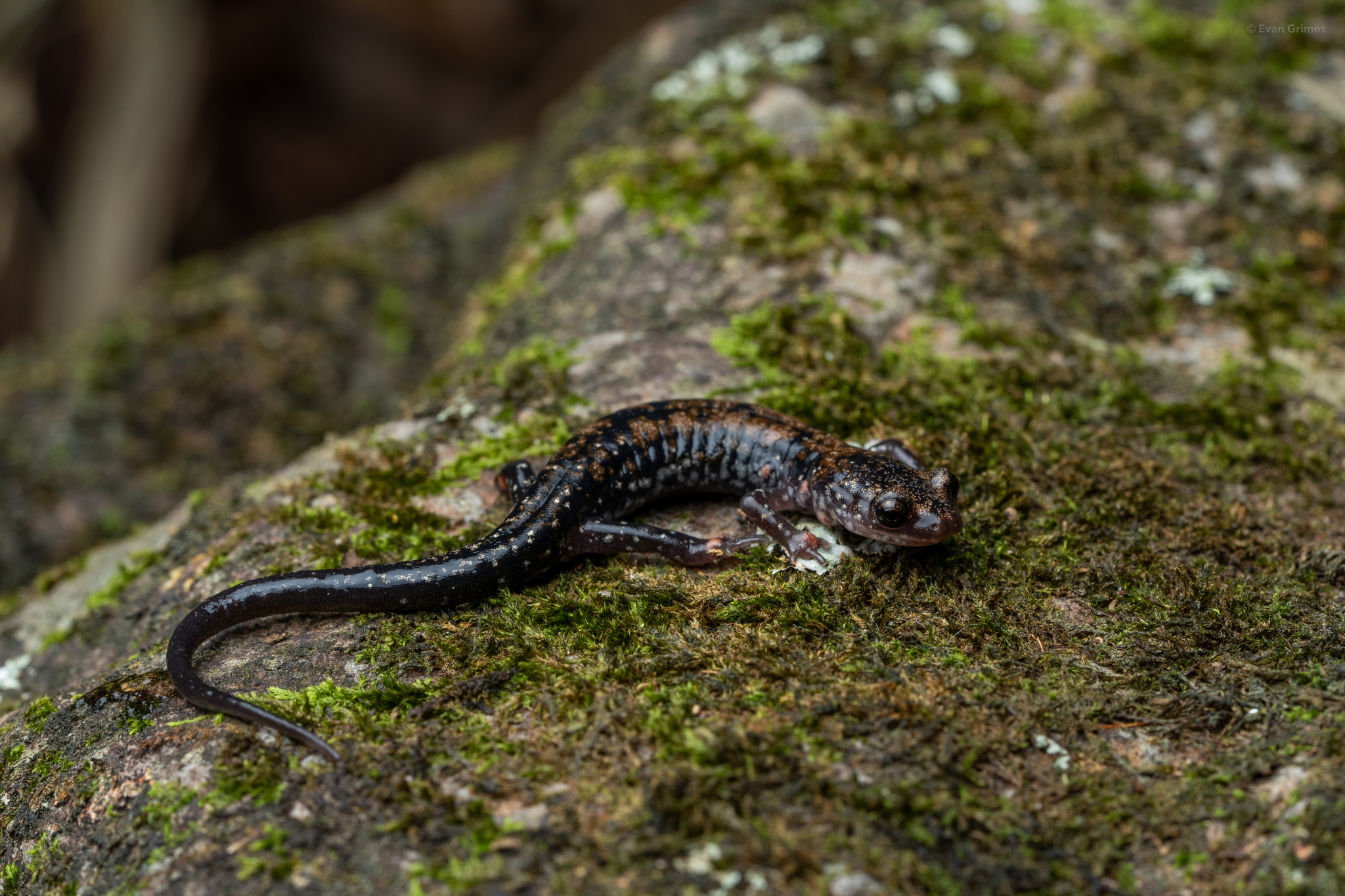
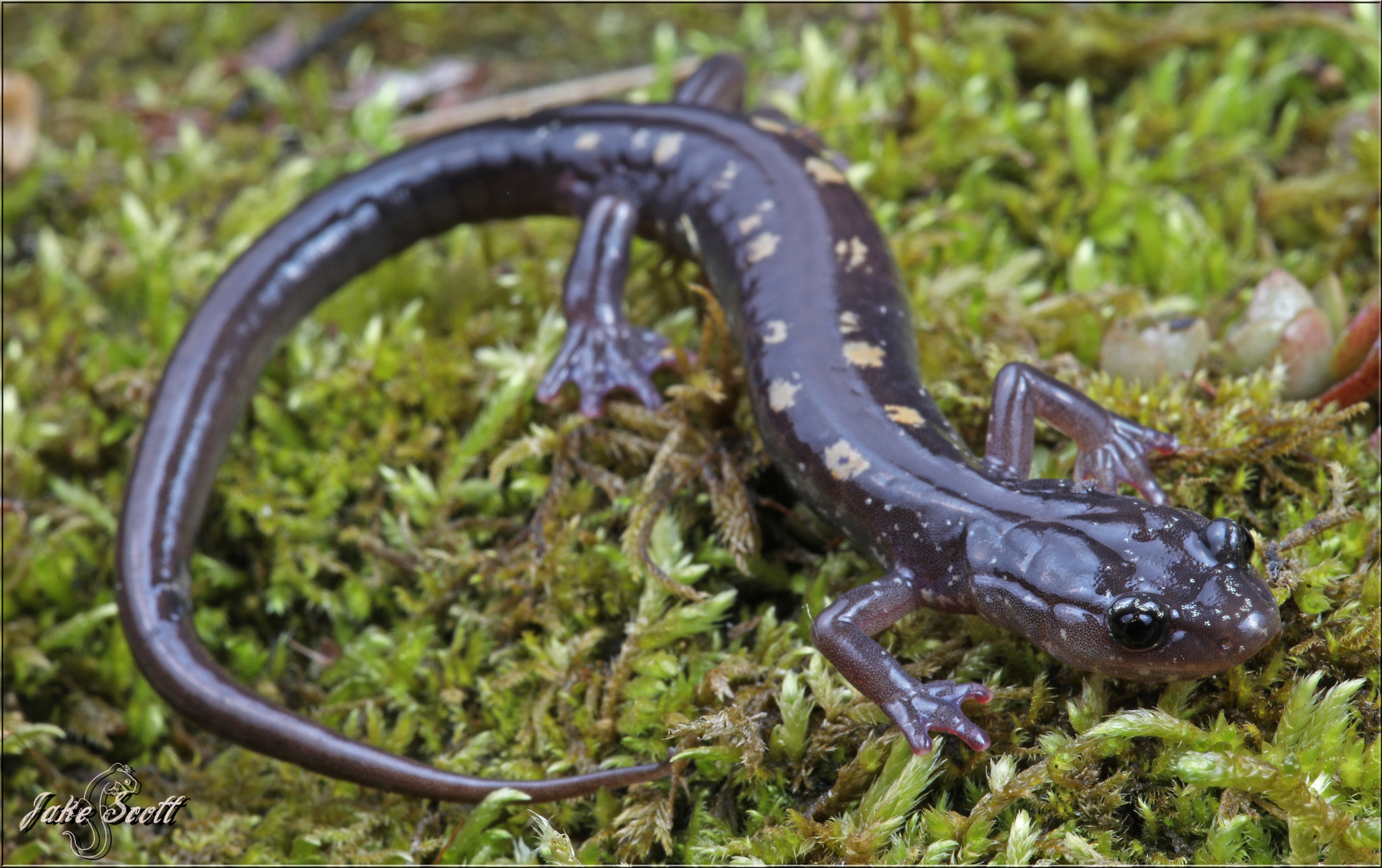
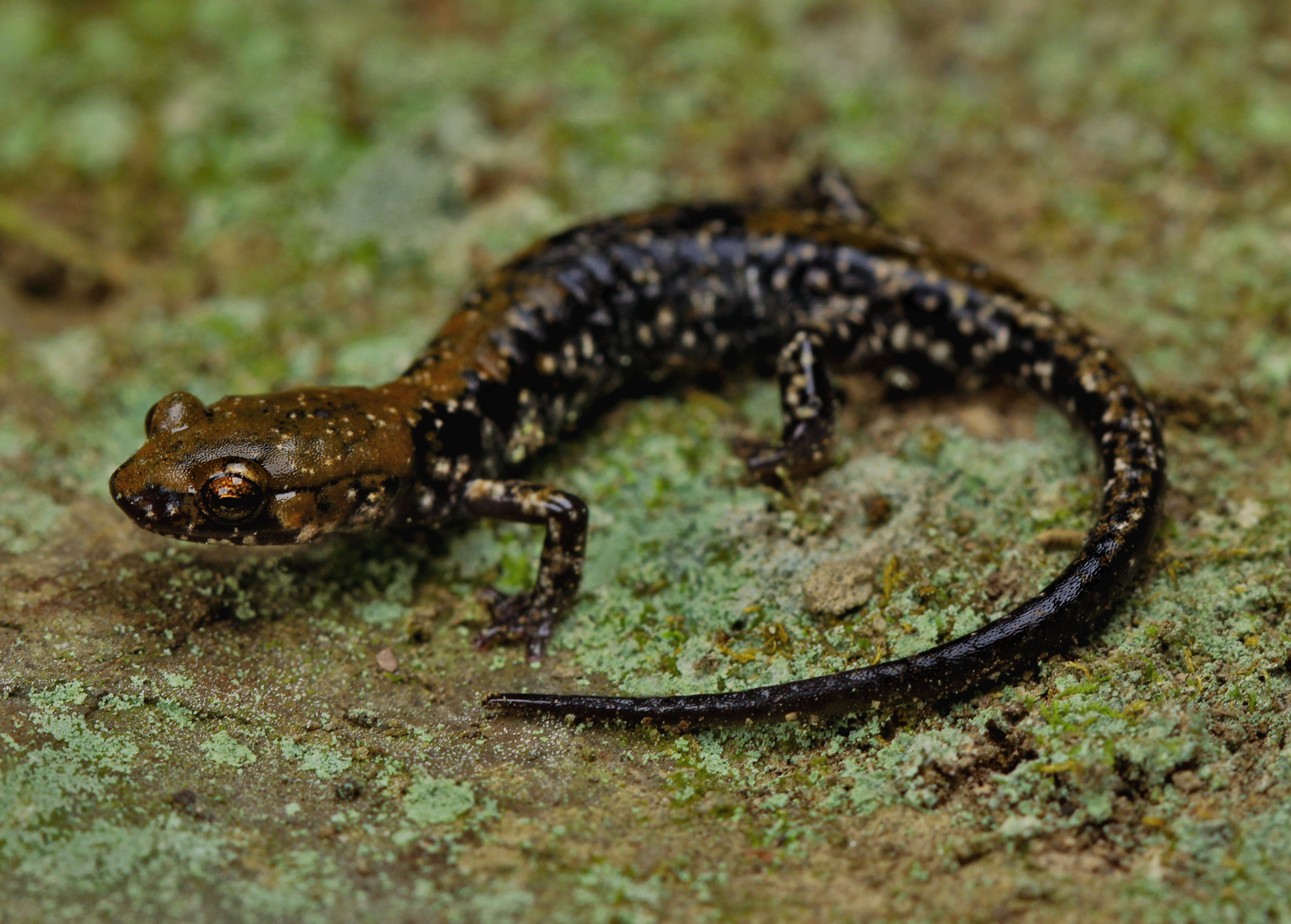
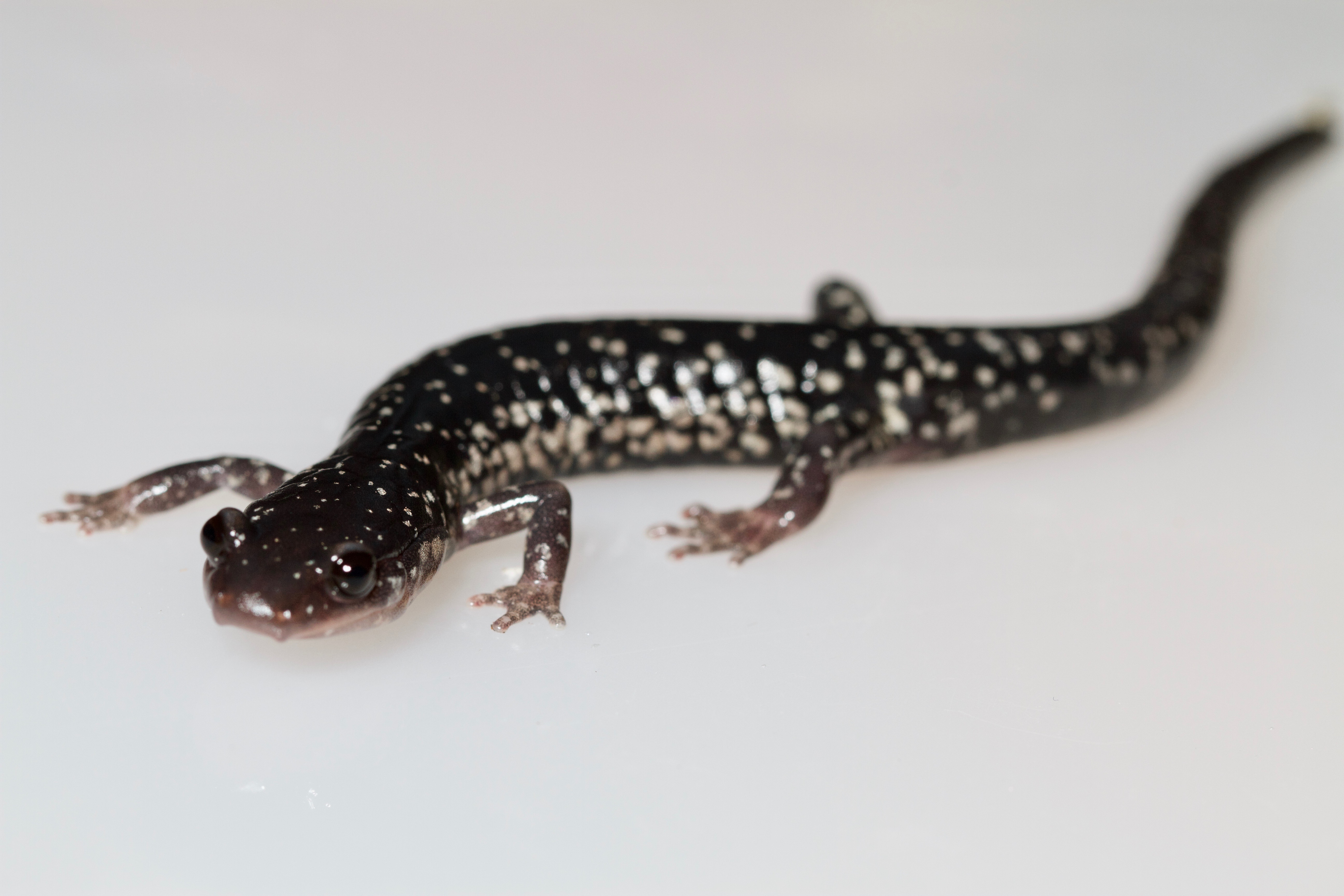
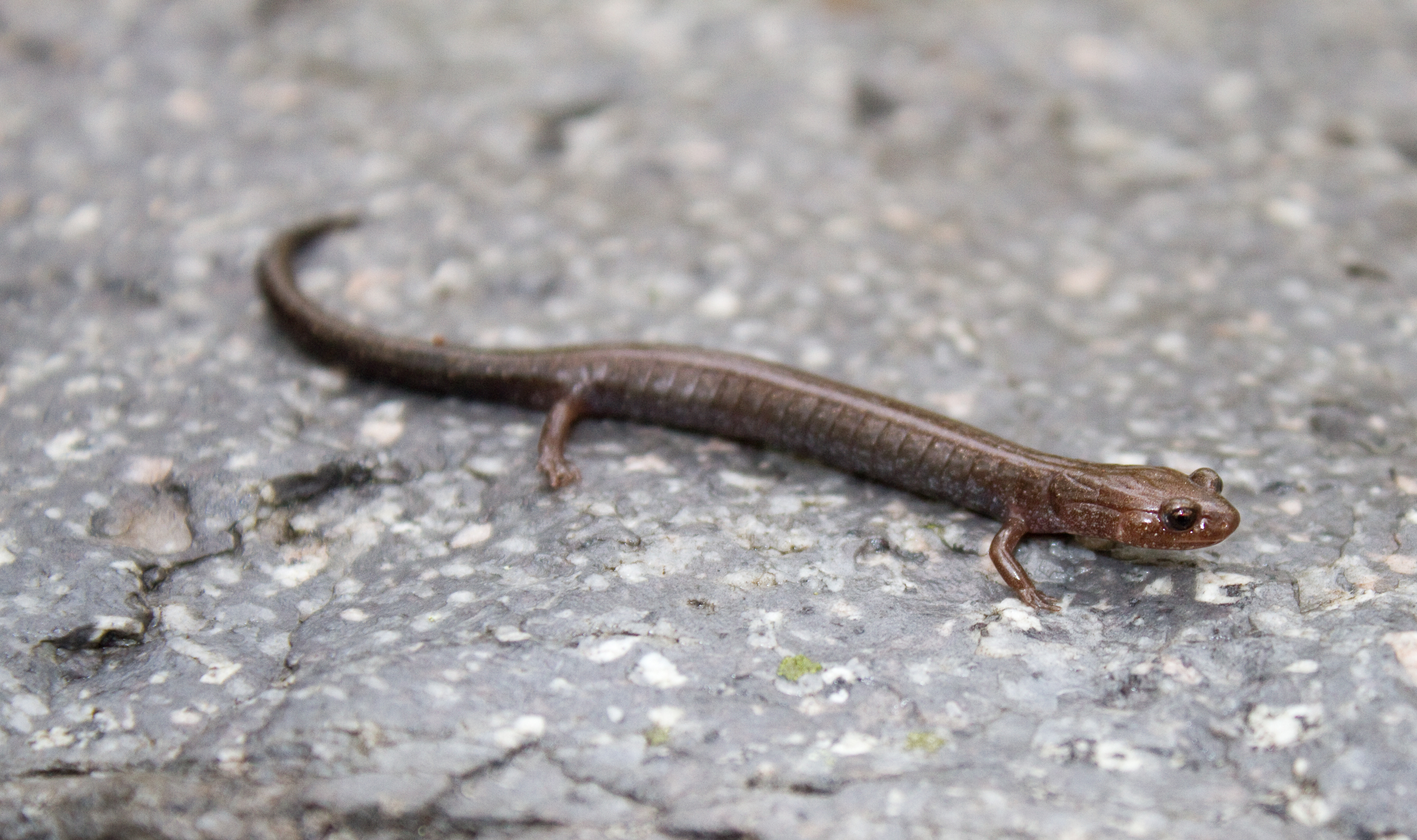
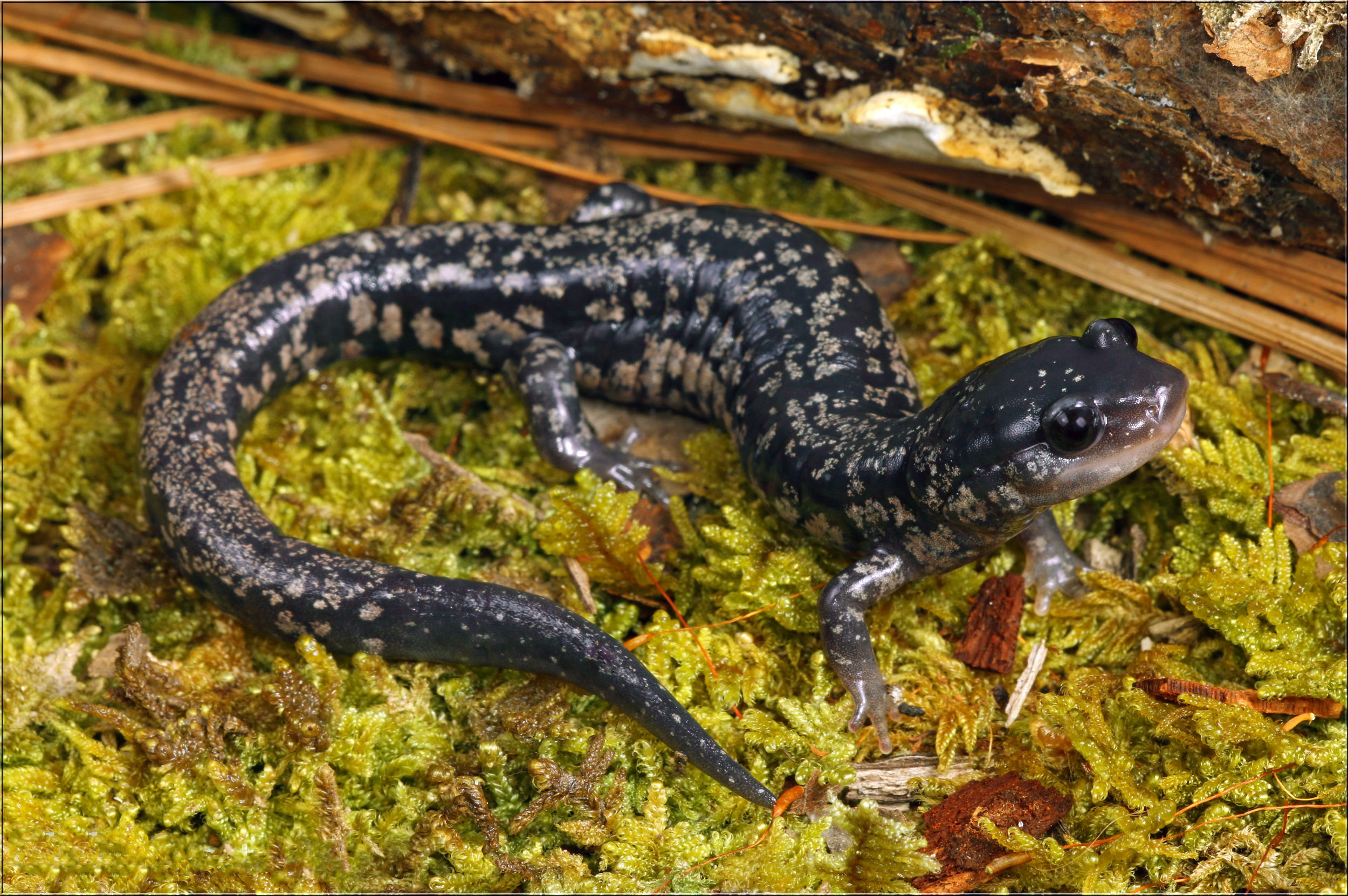
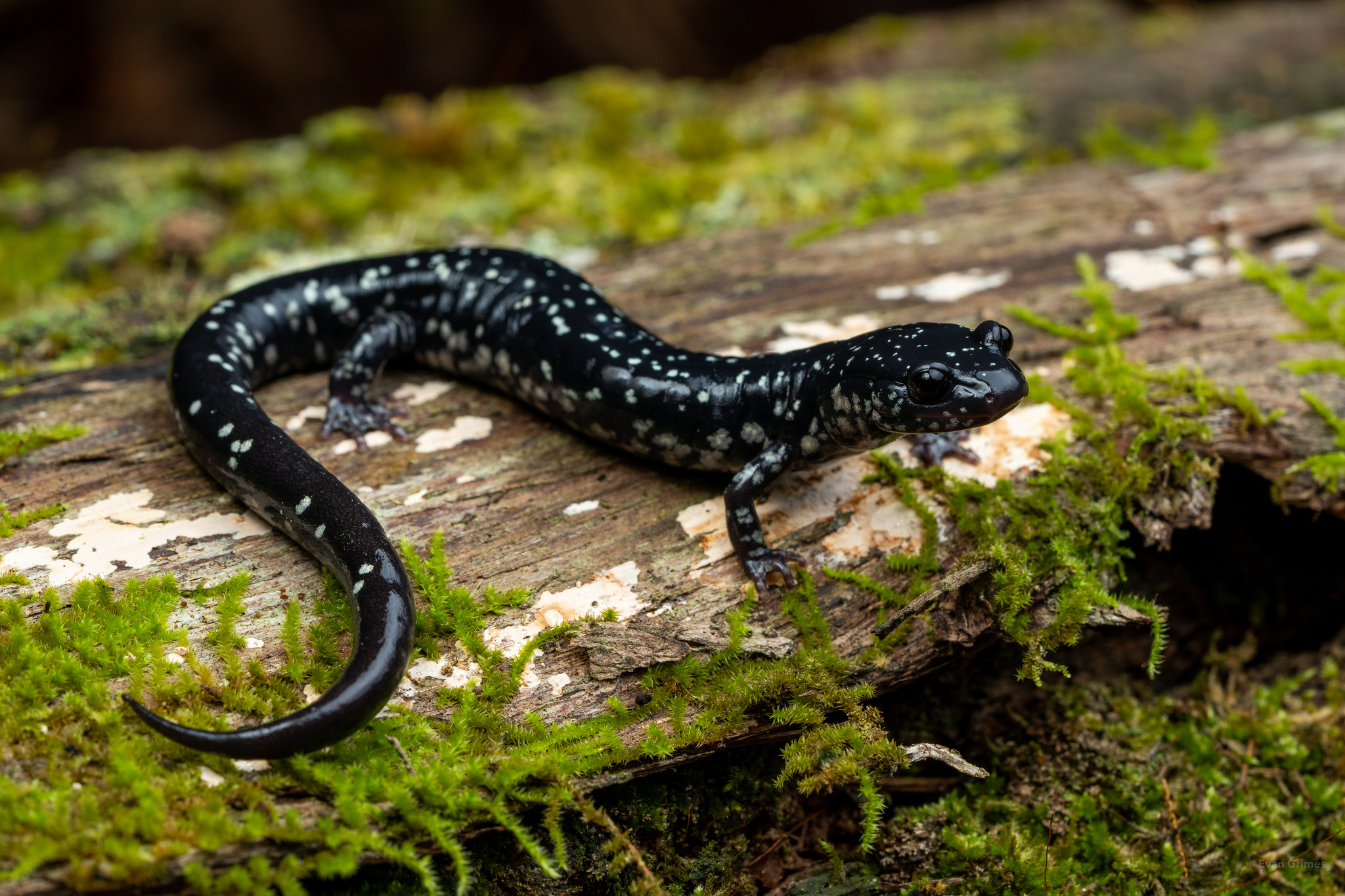
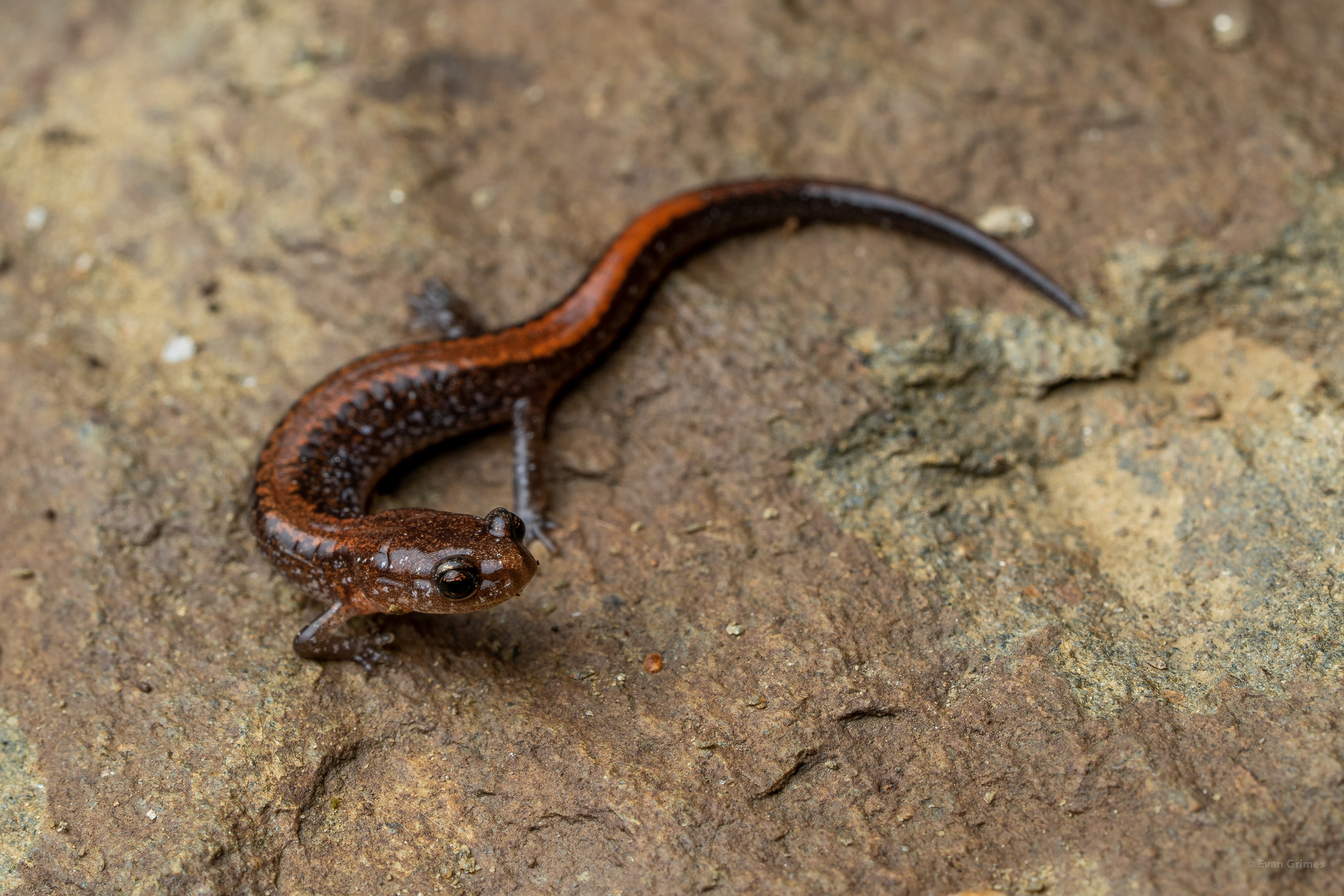
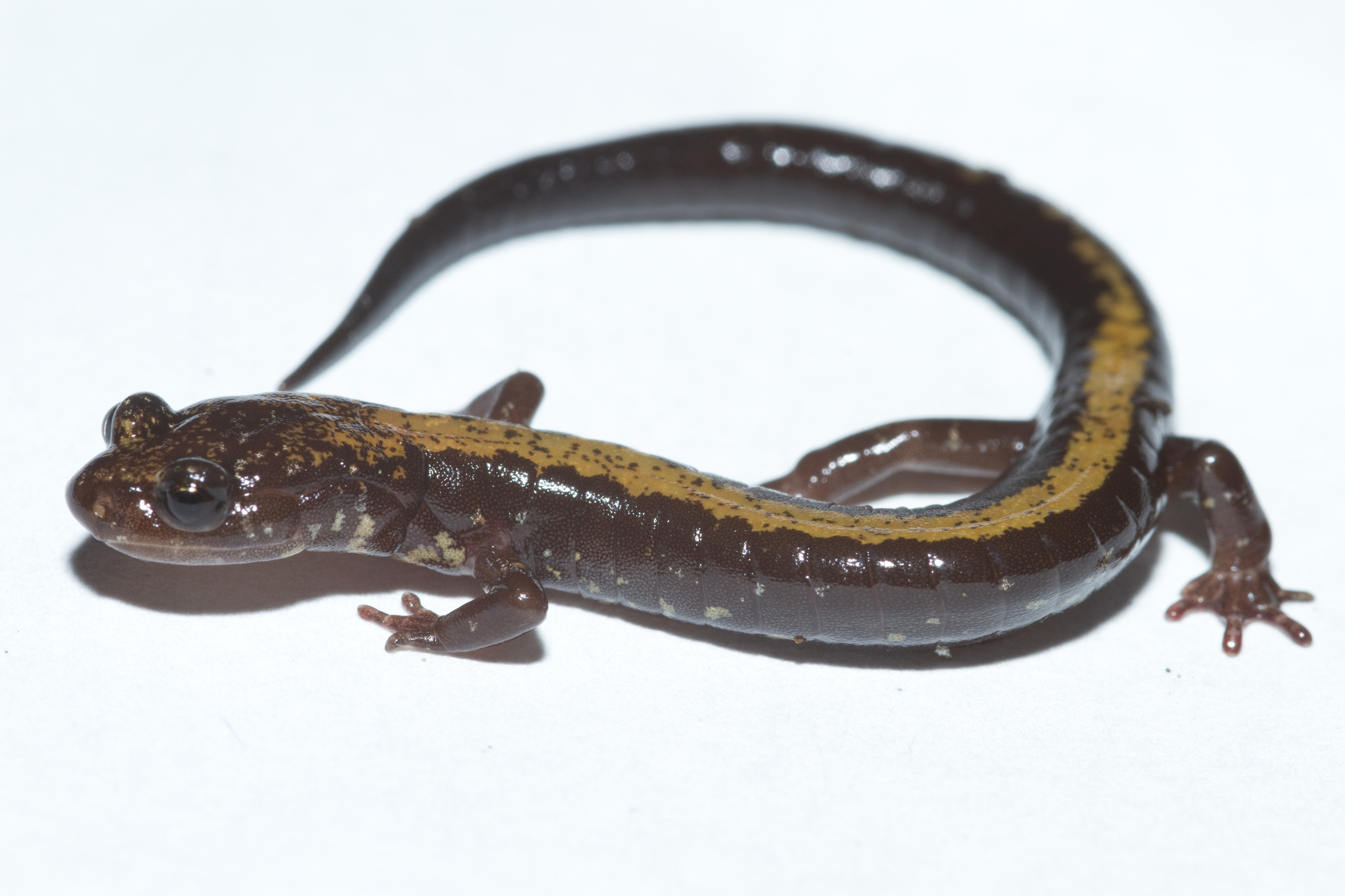
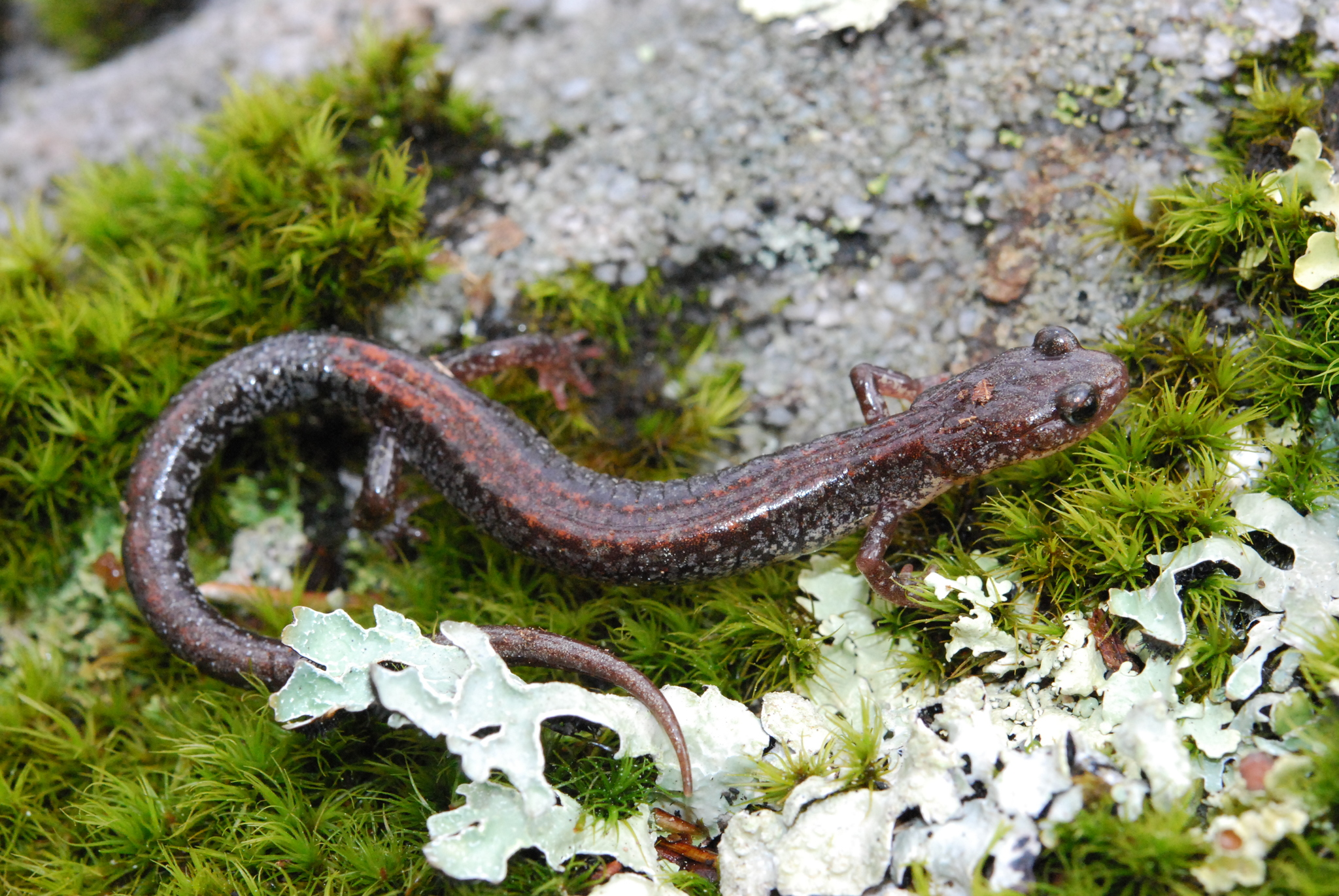
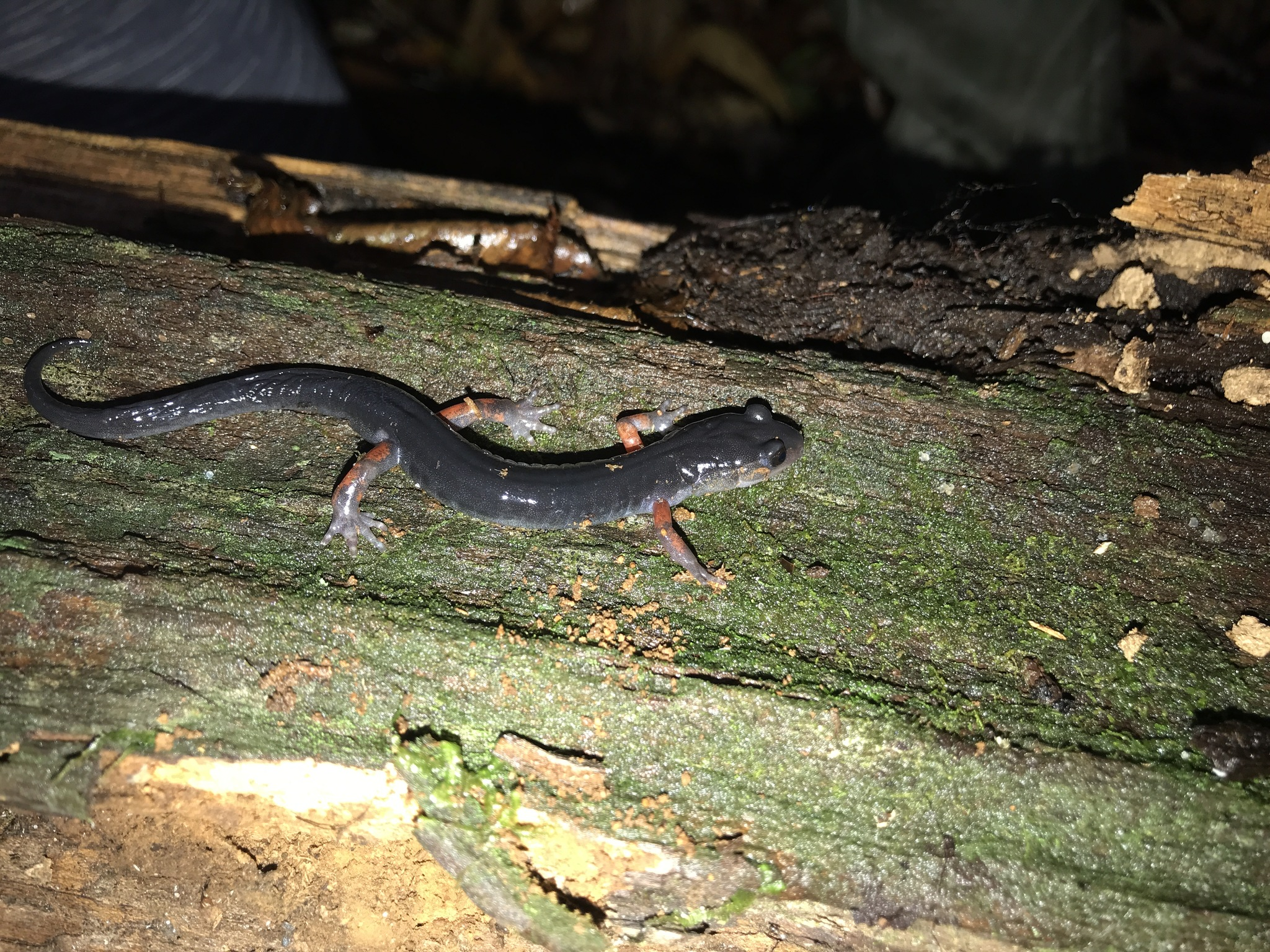
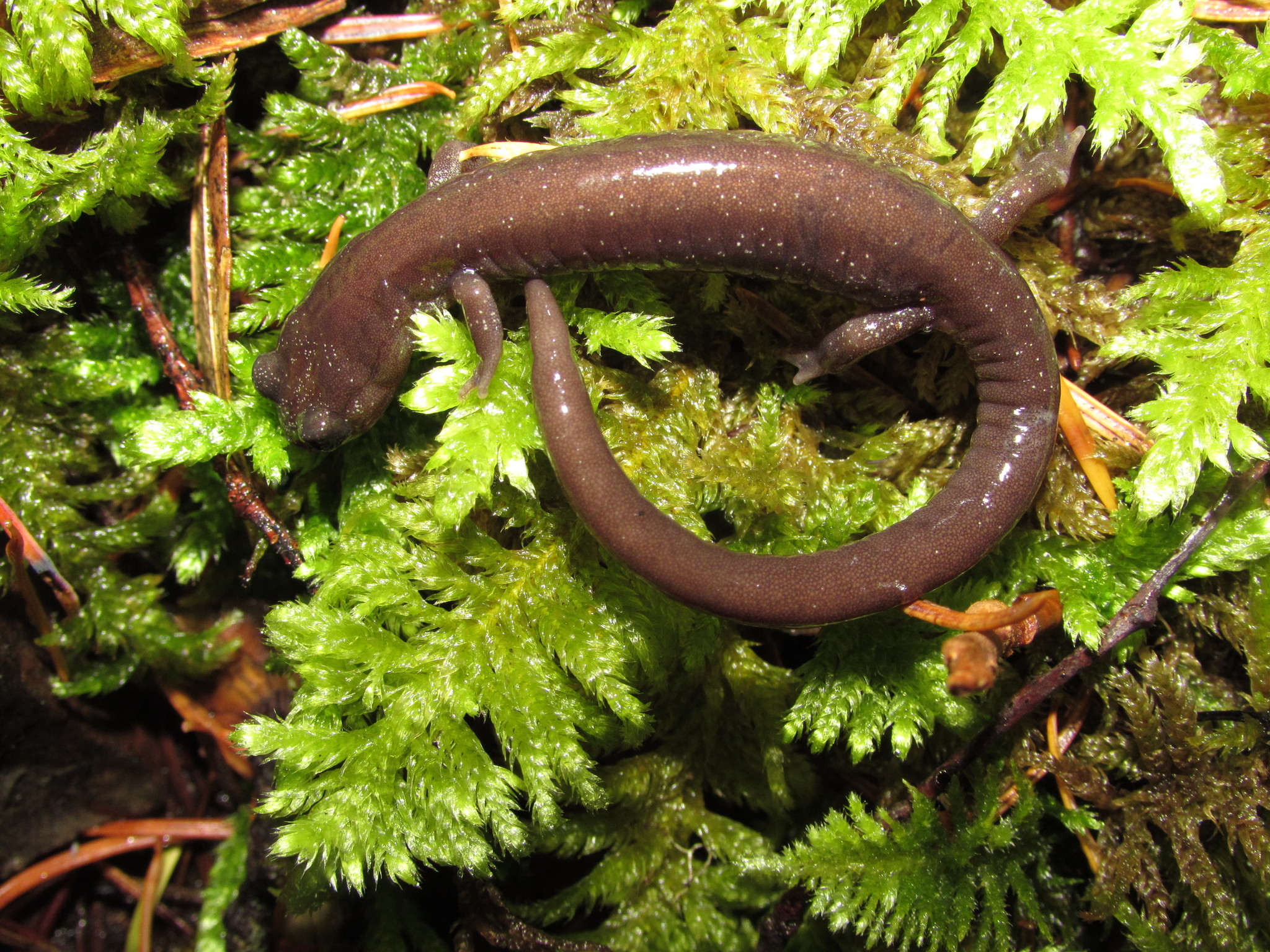
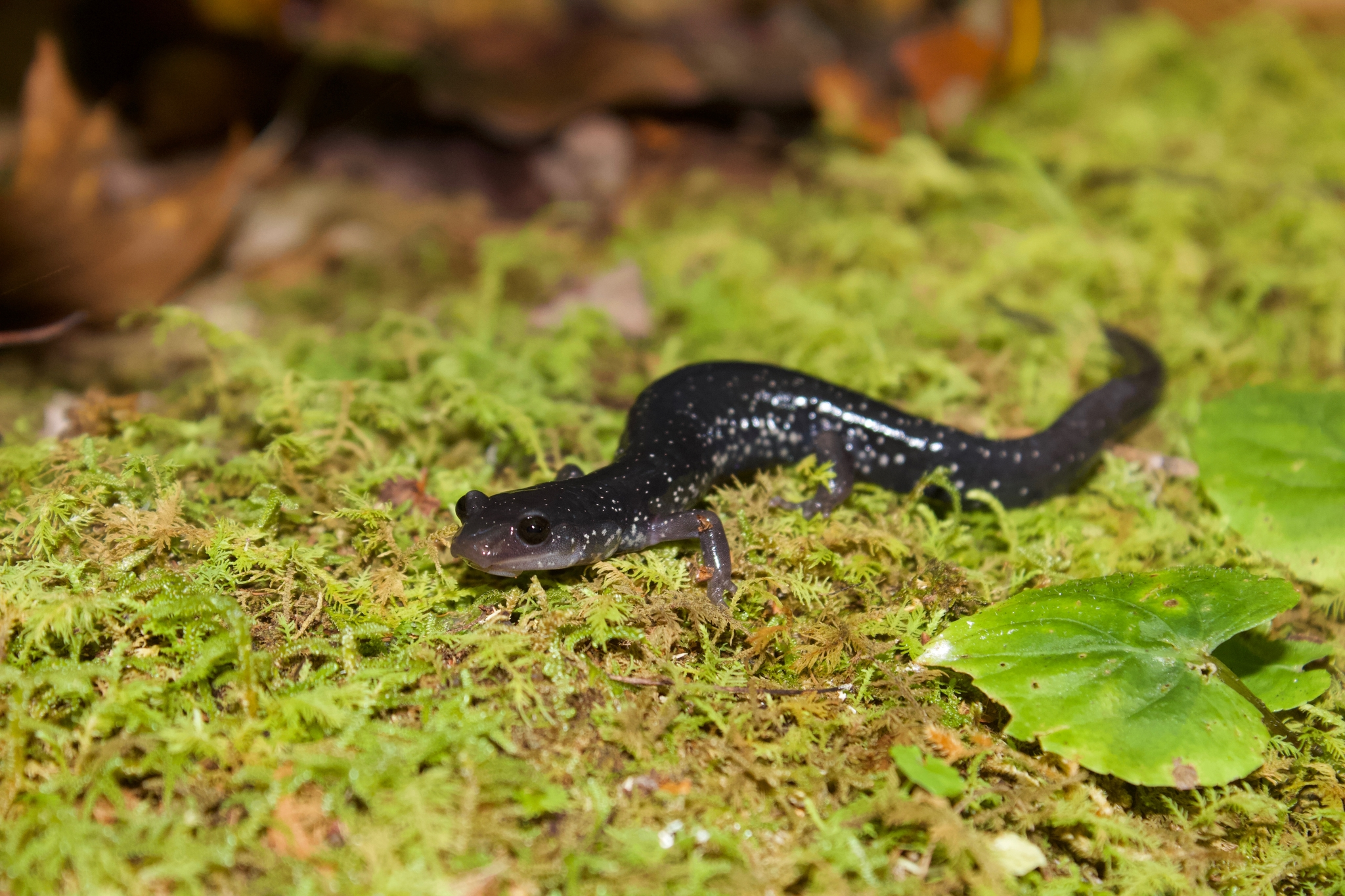
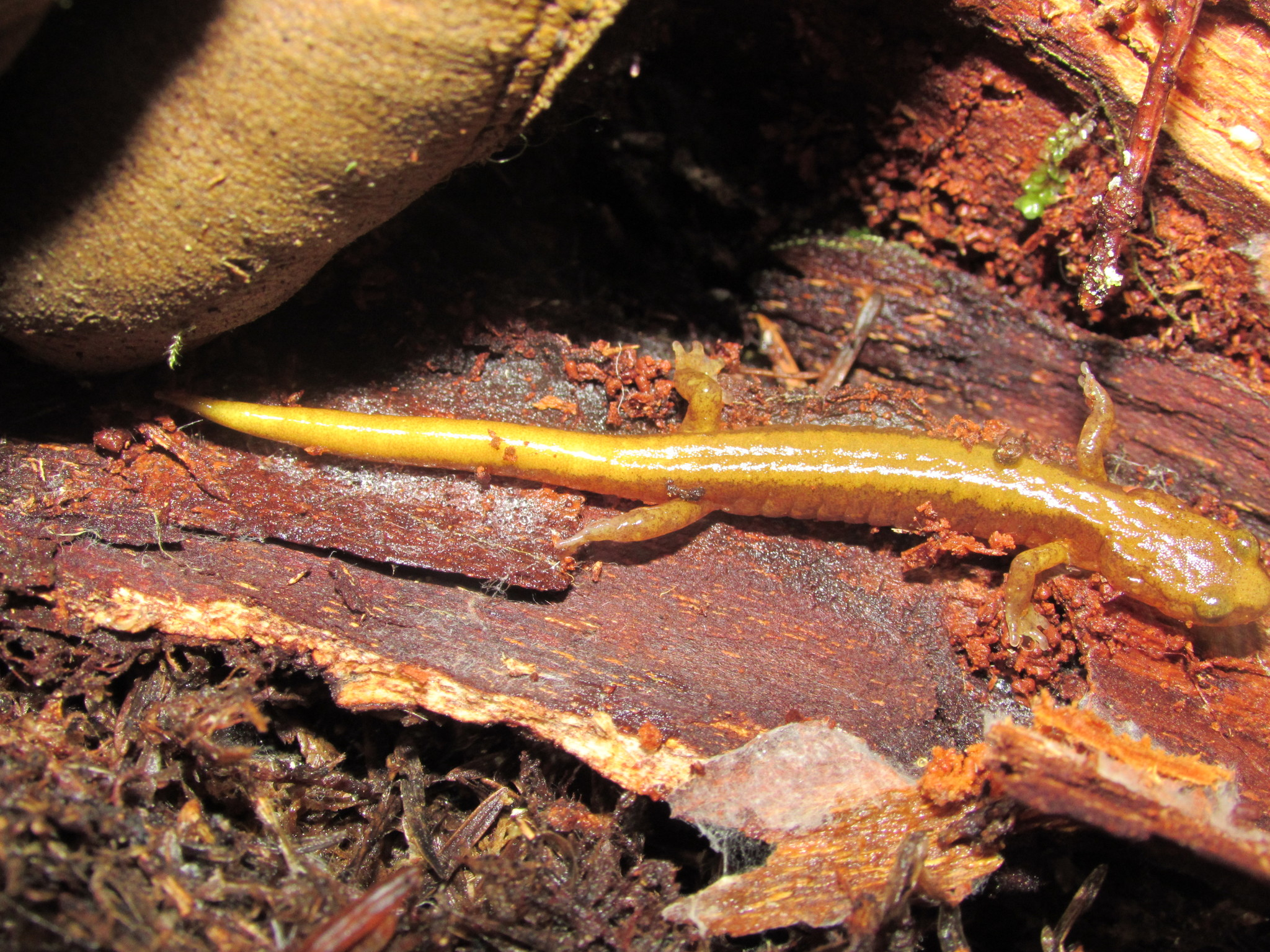
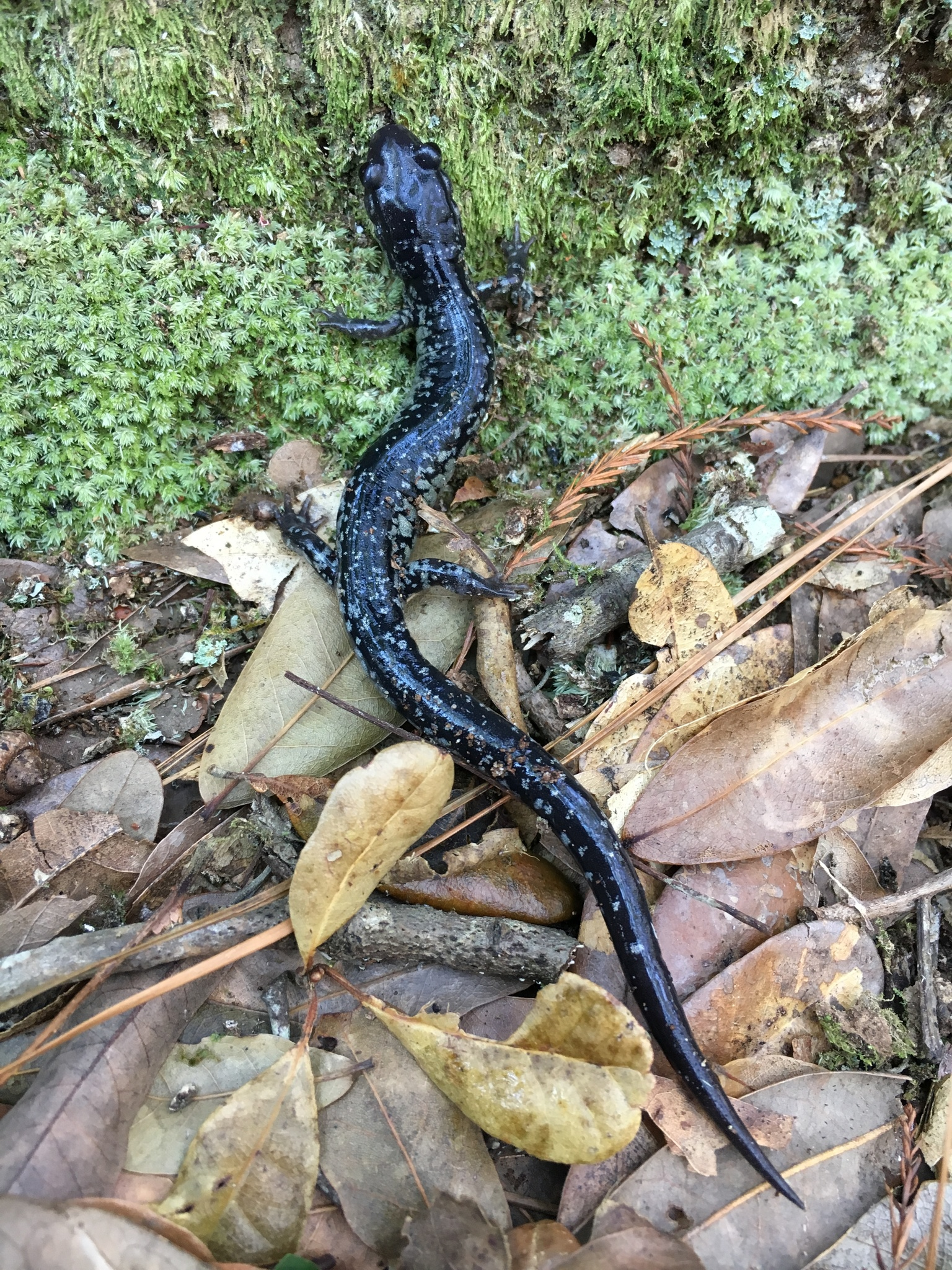
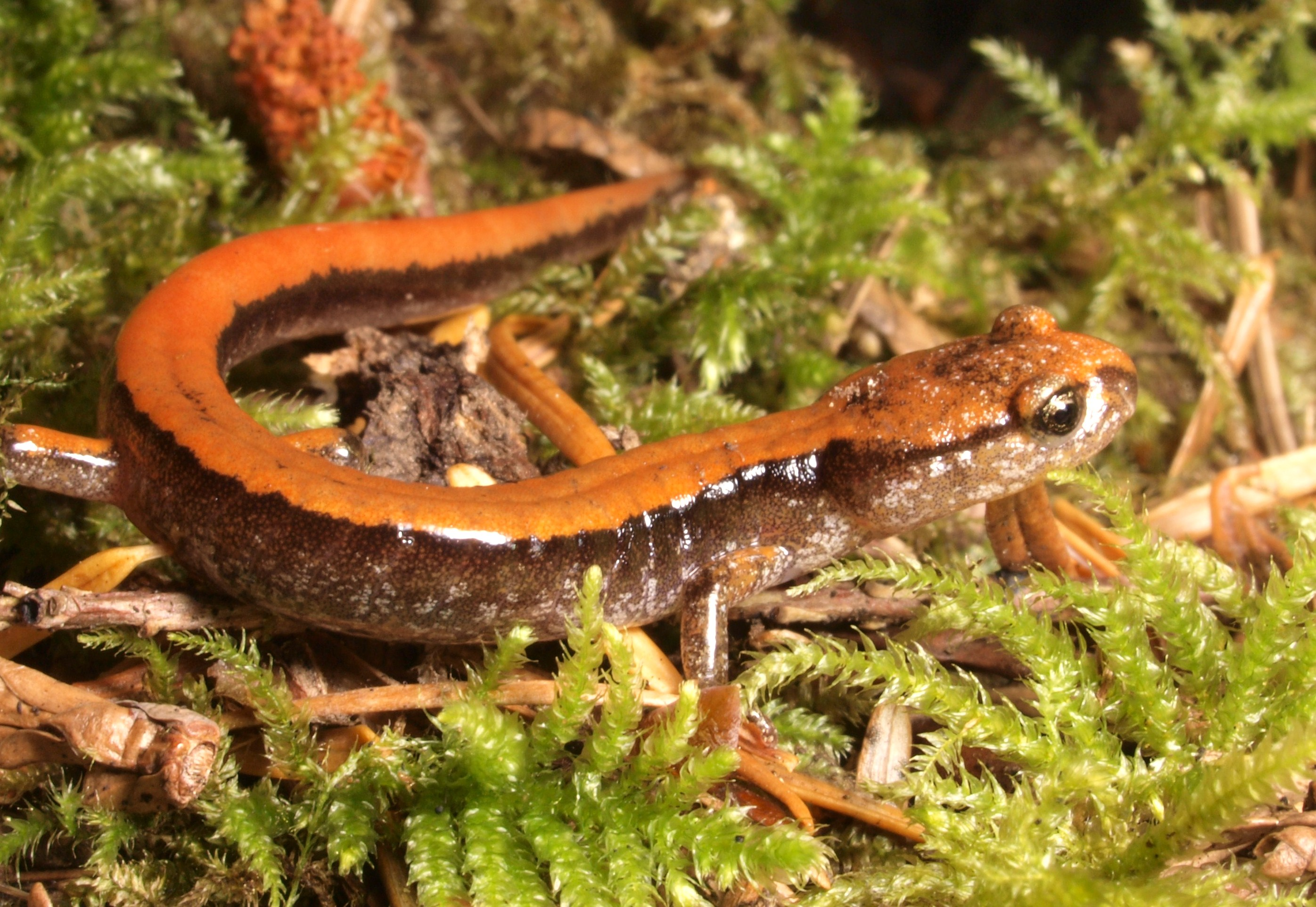
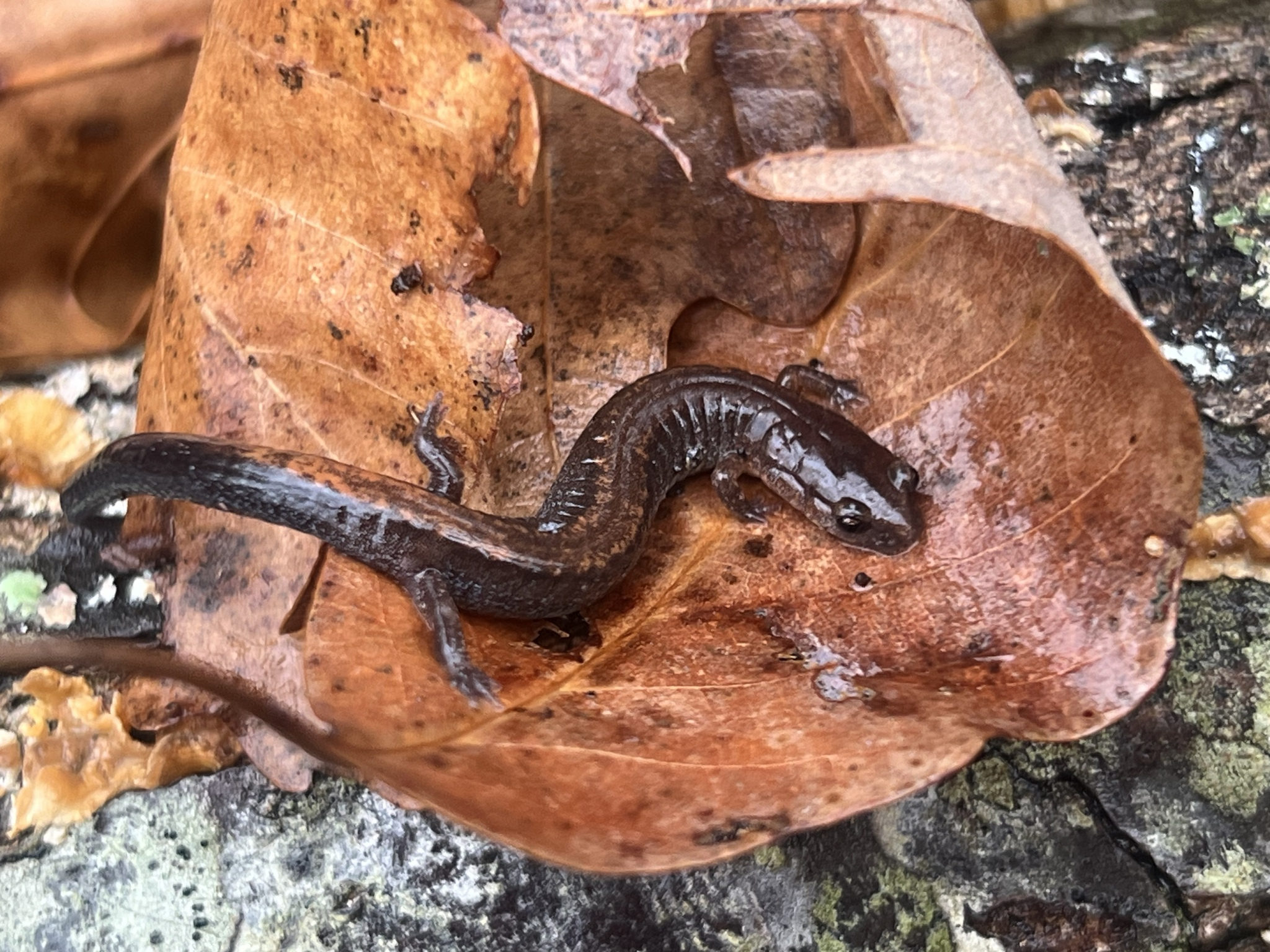
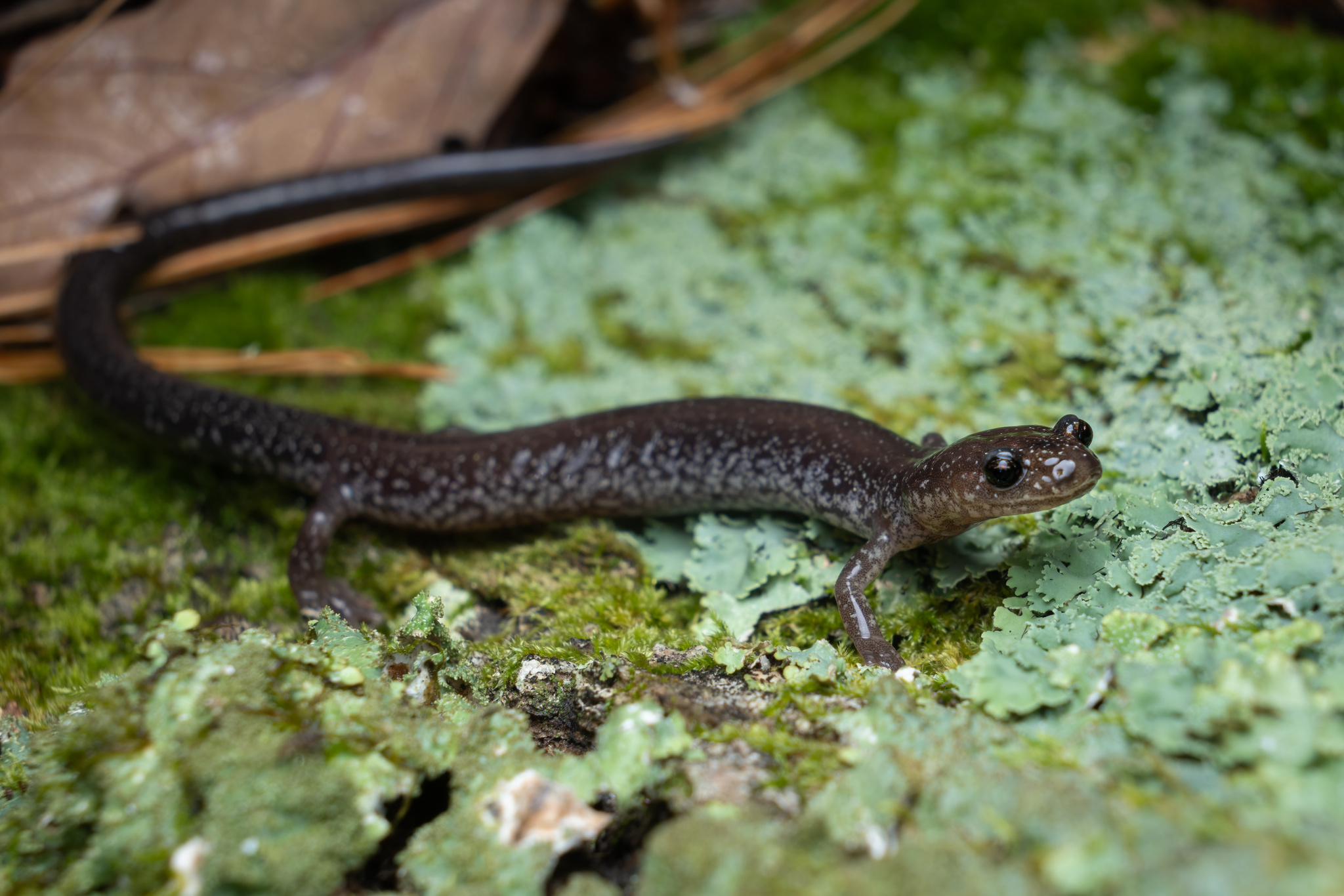
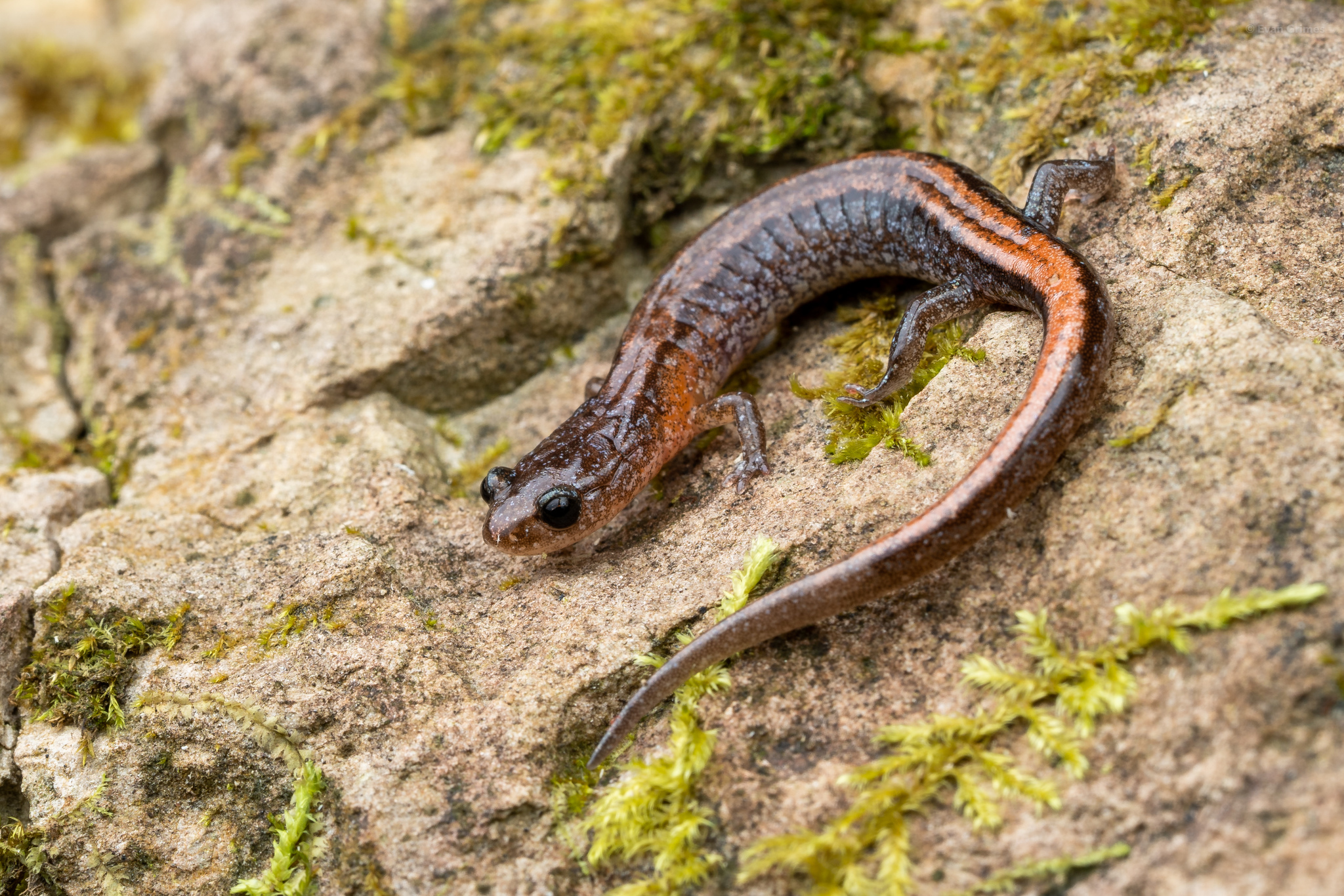
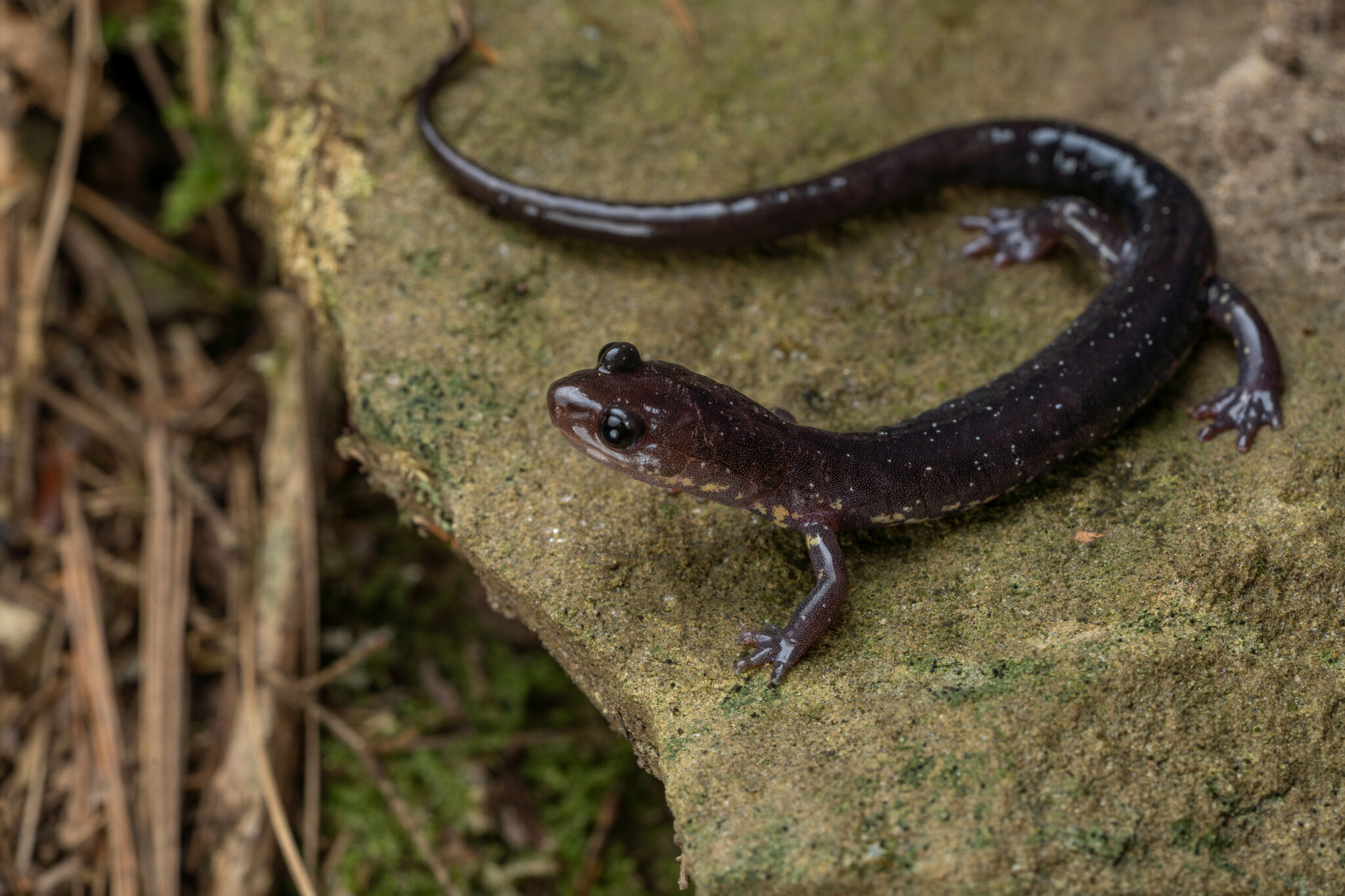
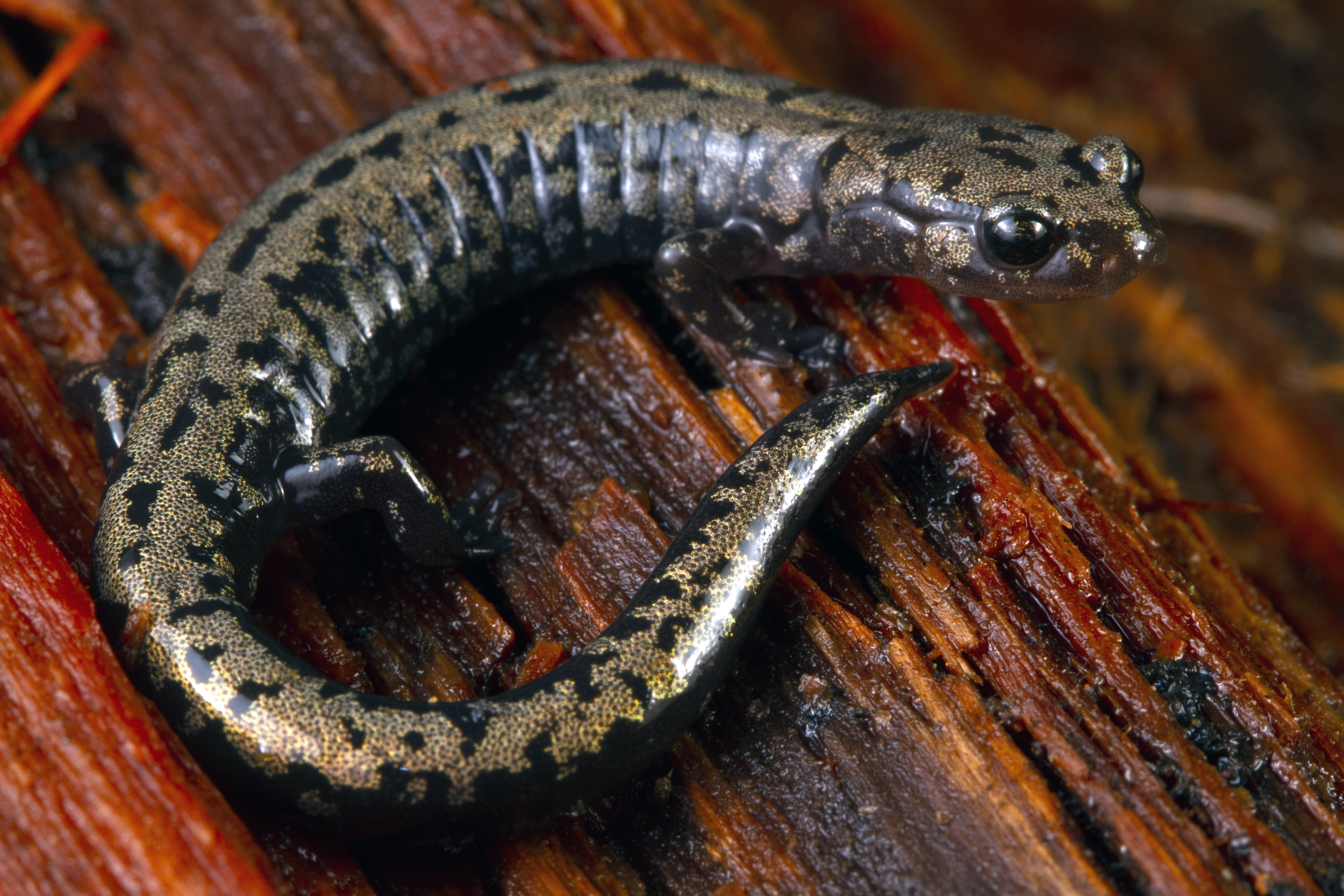
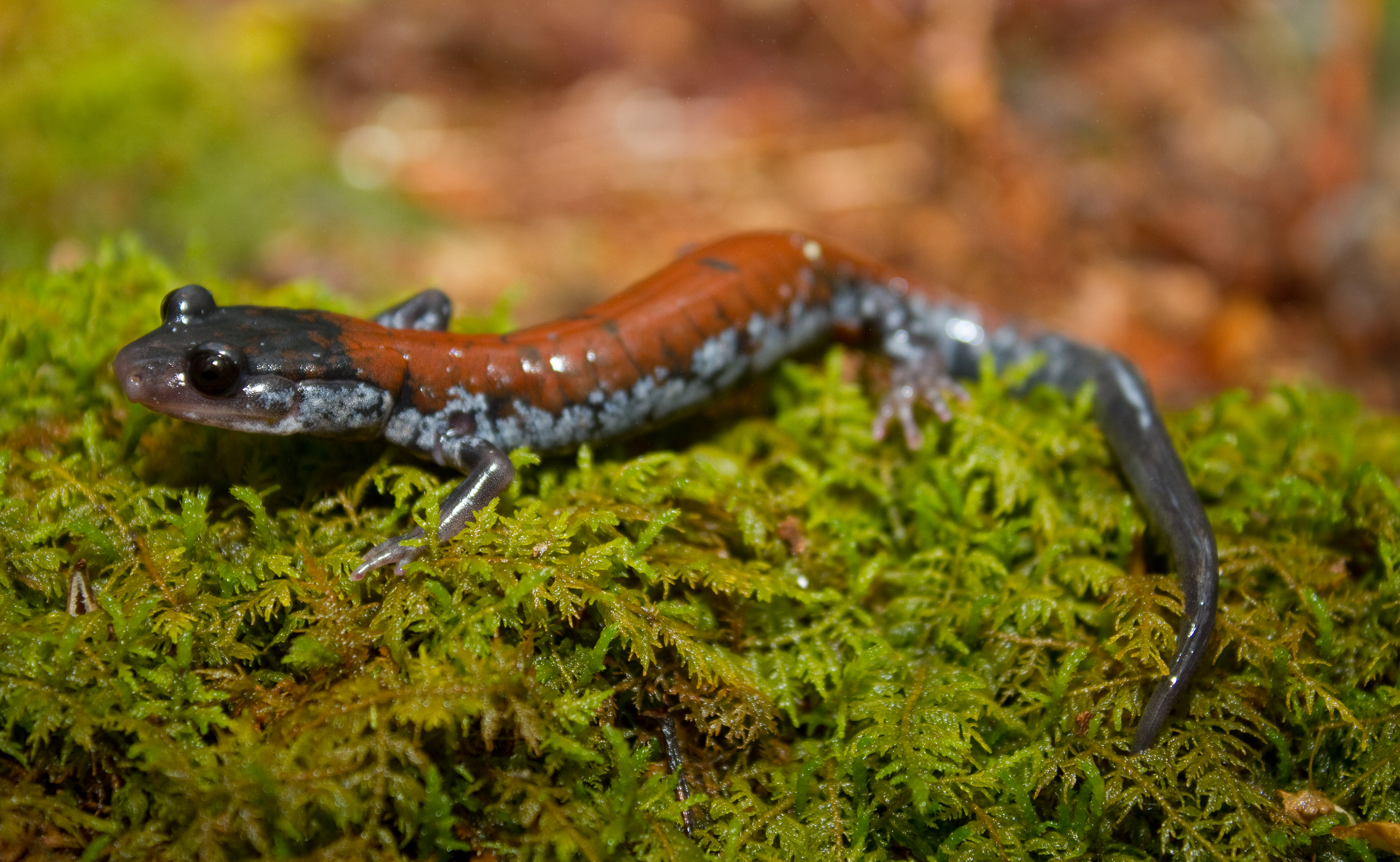
Image	Species and author	Common name	Geographic range	NatureServe status	IUCN status
	P. ainsworthi Lazell, 1998	Ainsworth's salamander	Central Mississippi? (uncertain validity)	Possibly Extinct (GH)
	P. albagula Grobman, 1944	Western slimy salamander	South-central United States (Missouri southwest to central Texas)	Secure (G5)
	P. amplus Highton & Peabody, 2000	Blue Ridge gray-cheeked salamander	Southern Blue Ridge Mountains (southwest North Carolina)	Imperiled (G2)
	P. angusticlavius Grobman, 1944	Ozark zigzag salamander	Ozark Mountains (Missouri, Arkansas, and Oklahoma)	Apparently Secure (G4)
	P. asupak Mead, Clayton, Nauman, Olson & Pfrender, 2005	Scott Bar salamander	Scott Bar Mountains (Siskiyou County, northern California)	Imperiled (G2)
	P. aureolus Highton, 1984	Tellico salamander	Unicoi Mountains (Tennessee-North Carolina border)	Imperiled (G2)
	P. caddoensis C. Pope & S. Pope, 1951	Caddo Mountain salamander	Caddo Mountains (western Arkansas)	Imperiled (G2)
	P. chattahoochee Highton, 1989	Chattahoochee slimy salamander	Chattahoochee National Forest (northern Georgia)	Vulnerable (G3)
	P. cheoah Highton & Peabody, 2000	Cheoah Bald salamander	Cheoah Bald (Graham and Swain counties, southwest North Carolina)	Critically Imperiled (G1)
	P. chlorobryonis Mittleman, 1951	Atlantic Coast slimy salamander	Atlantic Coastal Plain (Virginia south to Georgia)	Secure (G5)
	P. cinereus (J. Green, 1818)	Red-backed salamander	Northeast North America (Nova Scotia west to Minnesota and south to North Carolina)	Secure (G5)
	P. cylindraceus (Harlan, 1825)	White-spotted slimy salamander	Southeastern United States (Virginia west to easternmost Tennessee and south to South Carolina)	Secure (G5)
	P. dixi C. Pope & J. Fowler, 1949	Dixie Cavern salamander	Roanoke County, southwest Virginia	Critically Imperiled (G1)
	P. dorsalis Cope, 1889	Northern zigzag salamander	South-central United States (Indiana south to Alabama)	Secure (G5)
	P. dunni Bishop, 1934	Dunn's salamander	Pacific Coast (northwest California north to southwest Washington)	Apparently Secure (G4)
	P. electromorphus Highton, 1999	Northern ravine salamander	Midwestern United States (western Pennsylvania south to central West Virginia and west to Indiana)	Secure (G5)
	P. elongatus Van Denburgh, 1916	Del Norte salamander	Pacific Coast (northwest California and southwest Oregon)	Apparently Secure (G4)
	P. fourchensis Duncan & Highton, 1959	Fourche Mountain salamander	Fourche Mountain (Scott and Polk counties, western Arkansas)	Imperiled (G2)
	P. glutinosus (J. Green, 1818)	Northern slimy salamander	Eastern United States (Connecticut south to Georgia and west to Illinois and Alabama). Range extends to Florida, Mississippi, and Louisiana according to some conceptions of the species.	Secure (G5)
	P. grobmani Allen & Neill, 1949	Southeastern slimy salamander	Southeastern United States (Georgia, Alabama, northern Florida)	Secure (G5)
	P. hoffmani Highton, 1972	Valley and ridge salamander	Appalachian Mountains (central Pennsylvania south to southwest Virginia)	Secure (G5)
	P. hubrichti Thurow, 1957	Peaks of Otter salamander	Peaks of Otter area (southwest Virginia)	Imperiled (G2)
	P. idahoensis Slater & Slipp, 1940	Coeur d'Alene salamander	Rocky Mountains (northern Idaho and surrounding areas of Montana and British Columbia)	Apparently Secure (G4)
	P. jacksoni Newman, 1954	Blacksburg salamander	Southwest Virginia and surrounding areas of North Carolina	Unranked (GNR)
	P. jordani Blatchley, 1901	Red-cheeked salamander or Jordan's salamander	Great Smoky Mountains (Tennessee-North Carolina border)	Apparently Secure (G4)
	P. kentucki Mittleman, 1951	Cumberland Plateau salamander	Cumberland Plateau area (West Virginia south to northeast Tennessee)	Apparently Secure (G4)
	P. kiamichi Highton, 1989	Kiamichi slimy salamander	Kiamichi Mountains (Oklahoma, Arkansas)	Imperiled (G2)
	P. kisatchie Highton, 1989	Louisiana slimy salamander	Northern Louisiana and southern Arkansas	Vulnerable (G3)
	P. larselli Burns, 1954	Larch Mountain salamander	Cascade Range (northern Oregon and southern Washington)	Imperiled (G2)
	P. meridianus Highton & Peabody, 2000	South Mountain gray-cheeked salamander	South Mountains area (southwest North Carolina)	Imperiled (G2)
	P. metcalfi Brimley, 1912	Southern gray-cheeked salamander	Southern Blue Ridge Mountains (southwest North Carolina and surrounding areas of South Carolina and Georgia)	Apparently Secure (G4)
	P. mississippi Highton, 1989	Mississippi slimy salamander	South-central United States (eastern Kentucky south to Alabama and west to Louisiana)	Secure (G5)
	P. montanus Highton & Peabody, 2000	Northern gray-cheeked salamander	Appalachian and Blue Ridge mountains (southwest Virginia south to the Tennessee-North Carolina border)	Apparently Secure (G4)
	P. neomexicanus Stebbins & Riemer, 1950	Jemez Mountains salamander	Jemez Mountains (north-central New Mexico)	Critically Imperiled (G1)
	P. nettingi N.B. Green, 1938	Cheat Mountain salamander	Allegheny Mountains (northeast West Virginia)	Critically Imperiled (G1)
	P. ocmulgee Highton, 1989	Ocmulgee slimy salamander	Central Georgia	Unranked (GNR)
	P. ouachitae Dunn & Heinze, 1933	Rich Mountain salamander	Ouachita Mountains (western Arkansas and eastern Oklahoma)	Vulnerable (G3)
	P. pauleyi Felix, Wooten, Pierson & Camp, 2019	Yellow-spotted woodland salamander	Cumberland Plateau (southern West Virginia southwest to northeast Tennessee)	Unranked (GNR)
	P. petraeus Wynn, Highton & Jacobs, 1988	Pigeon Mountain salamander	Pigeon Mountain (northwest Georgia)	Imperiled (G2)
	P. punctatus Highton, 1972	Cow Knob salamander	George Washington National Forest (West Virginia-Virginia border)	Vulnerable (G3)
	P. richmondi Netting & Mittleman, 1938	Ravine salamander	East-central United States (southwest Virginia west to Kentucky and Indiana and south to North Carolina)	Secure (G5)
	P. savannah Highton, 1989	Savannah slimy salamander	East-central Georgia	Imperiled (G2)
	P. sequoyah Highton, 1989	Sequoyah slimy salamander	Beavers Bend State Park (eastern Oklahoma)	Critically Imperiled (G1)
	P. serratus Grobman, 1944	Southern red-backed salamander	Southeastern United States (southwest North Carolina west to Missouri and Oklahoma and south to Louisiana)	Secure (G5)
	P. shenandoah Highton & Worthington, 1967	Shenandoah salamander	Shenandoah National Park (Page and Madison counties, northwestern Virginia)	Critically Imperiled (G1)
	P. sherando Highton, 2004	Big Levels salamander	Big Levels (Augusta County, northwestern Virginia)	Imperiled (G2)
	P. shermani Stejneger, 1906	Red-legged salamander	Unicoi and Nantahala mountains (southwest North Carolina and surrounding areas of Tennessee and Georgia)	Vulnerable (G3)
	P. stormi Highton & Brame, 1965	Siskiyou Mountains salamander	Siskiyou Mountains (northern California and surrounding areas of Oregon)	Vulnerable (G3)
	P. teyahalee Hairston, 1950	Southern Appalachian salamander	Southern Blue Ridge Mountains (southwest North Carolina and surrounding areas of Tennessee, South Carolina, and Georgia)	Apparently Secure (G4)
	P. vandykei Van Denburgh, 1906	Van Dyke's salamander	Western Washington	Imperiled (G2)
	P. variolatus (Gilliams, 1818)	South Carolina slimy salamander	Atlantic Coastal Plain (South Carolina and Georgia)	Unranked (GNR)
	P. vehiculum (Cooper, 1860)	Western redback salamander	Pacific Coast (Oregon north to British Columbia)	Secure (G5)
	P. ventralis Highton, 1997	Southern zigzag salamander	Southeastern United States (southwest Virginia southwest to Mississippi)	Apparently Secure (G4)
	P. virginia Highton, 1999	Shenandoah Mountain salamander	George Washington National Forest (West Virginia-Virginia border)	Imperiled (G2)
	P. websteri Highton, 1979	Webster's salamander	Southeastern United States (South Carolina west to Mississippi)	Vulnerable (G3)
	P. wehrlei H. Fowler & Dunn, 1917	Wehrle's salamander	Appalachian Mountains (western New York south to West Virginia and western Virginia)	Apparently Secure (G4)
	P. welleri Walker, 1931	Weller's salamander	Blue Ridge Mountains (southwest Virginia south to the Tennessee-North Carolina border)	Vulnerable (G3)
	P. yonahlossee Dunn, 1917	Yonahlossee salamander	Blue Ridge Mountains (southwest Virginia south to the Tennessee-North Carolina border)	Apparently Secure (G4)

Nota bene: A binomial authority in parentheses indicates that the species was originally described in a genus other than Plethodon.

== Intrinsic Phylogeny ==
- - - - Plethodon larselli
      - - Plethodon vandykei
        - Plethodon idahoensis
    - - Plethodon neomexicanus
      - - - Plethodon vehiculum
          - Plethodon dunni
        - - Plethodon asupak
          - - Plethodon stormi
            - Plethodon elongatus
  - - - Plethodon serratus
      - - - Plethodon virginia
          - - Plethodon shenandoah
            - Plethodon cinereus
        - - Plethodon hoffmani
          - - Plethodon nettingi
            - - Plethodon hubrichti
              - - Plethodon electromorphus
                - Plethodon richmondi
    - - - Plethodon websteri
        - - - Plethodon punctatus
            - Plethodon wehrlei
          - - Plethodon welleri
            - - Plethodon angusticlavius
              - - Plethodon dorsalis
                - Plethodon ventralis
      - - Plethodon petraeus
        - - - - - Plethodon metcalfi
                - Plethodon montanus
              - - Plethodon amplus
                - Plethodon meridianus
            - - - Plethodon chattahoochee
                - - Plethodon chlorobryonis
                  - Plethodon variolatus
              - - Plethodon glutinosus
                - - - Plethodon cylindraceus
                    - Plethodon teyahalee
                  - - Plethodon aureolus
                    - Plethodon cheoah
          - - - Plethodon caddoensis
              - - Plethodon ouachitae
                - Plethodon fourchensis
            - - Plethodon kentucki
              - - Plethodon jordani
                - - Plethodon yonahlossee
                  - - Plethodon shermani
                    - - - Plethodon mississippi
                        - Plethodon kiamichi
                      - - - Plethodon sequoyah
                          - Plethodon albagula
                        - - Plethodon kisatchie
                          - - Plethodon grobmani
                            - - Plethodon ocmulgee
                              - Plethodon savannah

Intrinsic phylogeny tree of genus Plethodon.
