= List of amphibians of Arkansas =

The U.S. state of Arkansas is located in the central part of the country. This list is derived largely from the Herps of Arkansas website. Conservation status is derived from NatureServe and represents the species' status within the state rather than their worldwide status. In Arkansas, there are 26 species of frog and toad, and 33 species of newts and salamanders. Of these species, 18 are ranked as "secure", 6 are "apparently secure", 10 are "vulnerable", 11 are "imperiled", 9 are "critically imperiled", and 1 is "possibly extirpated"; 3 species are not assessed.

== Frogs and toads ==
Order: Anura - frogs and toads

Family: Bufonidae - true toads

Image	Common name	Scientific name	Status	Notes	Distribution
(Note: This image shows the subspecies Anaxyrus americanus americanus; the Arkansas subspecies is not present on Wikimedia Commons)	Dwarf American toad	Anaxyrus americanus charlesmithi (Bragg, 1954)	Secure	Non-nominate subspecies	Statewide
	Fowler's toad	Anaxyrus fowleri (Hinckley, 1882)	Secure	Hybridizes with Woodhouse's toad in the southwestern part of the state, but A. woodhousii is not itself known to occur in Arkansas	Statewide
	Coastal plain toad	Incilius nebulifer (Girard, 1854)	Critically imperiled		South Arkansas

Family: Hylidae - tree frogs

Image	Common name	Scientific name	Status	Notes	Distribution
	Blanchard's cricket frog	Acris blanchardi Harper, 1947	Secure		Statewide
	Western bird-voiced tree frog	Dryophytes avivoca avivoca (Viosca, 1928)	Vulnerable (Note: Ranked at species level rather than subspecies level in Arkansas)	Sometimes put in the genus Hyla	Along various waterways throughout southwestern and central Arkansas
	Cope's gray tree frog	Dryophytes chrysoscelis (Cope, 1880)	Apparently secure	Usually indistinguishable from Dryophytes versicolor without DNA analysis or analysis of mating call Sometimes put in the genus Hyla	Most of Arkansas except the northwest
	Green tree frog	Dryophytes cinereus (Schneider, 1799)	Secure	Sometimes put in the genus Hyla	Most of Arkansas except north-central and northwest
	Squirrel tree frog	Dryophytes squirellus (Daudin, 1800)	Critically imperiled	Sometimes put in the genus Hyla	Southeastern and south-central Arkansas
	Gray tree frog	Dryophytes versicolor (Le Conte, 1825)	Apparently secure	Usually indistinguishable from Dryophytes chrysoscelis without DNA analysis or analysis of mating call Sometimes put in the genus Hyla	Northwestern Arkansas
	Spring peeper	Pseudacris crucifer (Wied-Neuwied, 1838)	Secure		Mostly statewide, more scattered throughout the east
	Cajun chorus frog	Pseudacris fouquettei Lemmon et al., 2008	Secure		Statewide except southeast and north-central
	Illinois chorus frog	Pseudacris illinoensis Smith, 1951	Critically imperiled		Sand prairies of eastern Clay County, although its habitat has recently been converted to agricultural land
	Boreal chorus frog	Pseudacris maculata Agassiz, 1850	Imperiled		Only confirmed from Pea Ridge National Military Park in Benton County
	Strecker's chorus frog	Pseudacris streckeri A. A. Wright & A. H. Wright, 1933	Imperiled		Along the Arkansas River in central and western Arkansas

Family: Microhylidae - narrow-mouthed frogs

Image	Common name	Scientific name	Status	Notes	Distribution
	Eastern narrow-mouthed toad	Gastrophryne carolinensis (Holbrook, 1835)	Secure		Statewide
	Western narrow-mouthed toad	Gastrophryne olivacea Hallowell, 1856	Imperiled		Generally along the Arkansas River in central and western Arkansas, southern and northwestern populations of uncertain validity

Family: Ranidae - typical frogs

Image	Common name	Scientific name	Status	Notes	Distribution
	Crawfish frog	Lithobates areolatus	Imperiled	Subspecies L. a. areolatus across most of range, L. a. circulosus may occur in southwest	Northeast, northwest, southwest, and along Arkansas River until Lake Maumelle, where the range extends northeast to the intersection of the Black River and White River
	Plains leopard frog	Lithobates blairi (Mecham et al., 1973)	Critically imperiled		Northern Mississippi County
	American bullfrog	Lithobates catesbeianus (Shaw, 1802)	Secure		Statewide
	Green frog	Lithobates clamitans (Latreille, 1801)	Apparently secure	Two subspecies: The northern green frog (L. c. melanota) occurs in the northwest and central parts of Arkansas; The bronze frog (L. c. clamitans) occurs in the northeast, east, and south	Statewide
	Pickerel frog	Lithobates palustris (Le Conte, 1825)	Apparently secure		Northern and southwestern Arkansas, scattered records statewide
	Coastal Plains leopard frog	Lithobates sphenocephalus utricularius (Harlan, 1825)	Secure (Note: Ranked at species level rather than subspecies level in Arkansas)	Non-nominate subspecies	Statewide
	Wood frog	Lithobates sylvaticus (Le Conte, 1825)	Vulnerable		Northwestern Arkansas, in Ozark Highlands and Boston Mountains

Family: Scaphiopodidae - American spadefoots

Image	Common name	Scientific name	Status	Notes	Distribution
	Eastern spadefoot	Scaphiopus holbrookii (Harlan, 1835)	Imperiled	Formerly considered the same species as Hurter's spadefoot	Northeastern Arkansas, historical records south of this along the Mississippi River may represent this species or Hurter's spadefoot
	Hurter's spadefoot	Scaphiopus hurterii Strecker, 1910	Imperiled	Formerly considered the same species as the eastern spadefoot	Along various rivers in northern and central Arkansas; widespread in southwest. Populations in southeast may be this species or eastern spadefoot. Northwestern populations are extirpated
	Plains spadefoot	Spea bombifrons (Cope, 1863)	Critically imperiled		Along the Arkansas River in central Arkansas

== Newts and salamanders ==
Order: Caudata

Family: Ambystomatidae - mole salamanders

Image	Common name	Scientific name	Status	Notes	Distribution
	Ringed salamander	Ambystoma annulatum Cope, 1886	Vulnerable		Northwestern and western Arkansas
	Spotted salamander	Ambystoma maculatum (Shaw, 1802)	Secure		Statewide
	Marbled salamander	Ambystoma opacum (Gravenhorst, 1807)	Secure		Statewide except northwest
	Mole salamander	Ambystoma talpoideum Holbrook, 1838	Vulnerable		Southwestern Arkansas, and east of the Black River in the northeast
	Small-mouthed salamander	Ambystoma texanum (Matthes, 1855)	Secure		Most of Arkansas except north-central
	Eastern tiger salamander	Ambystoma tigrinum (Green, 1825)	Vulnerable		Eastern Springfield Plateau in northern Arkansas

Family: Amphiumidae - Amphiumas

Image	Common name	Scientific name	Status	Notes	Distribution
	Three-toed amphiuma	Amphiuma tridactylum Cuvier, 1827	Secure		Southern, eastern, and central Arkansas

Family: Cryptobranchidae - giant salamanders

Image	Common name	Scientific name	Status	Notes	Distribution
	Ozark hellbender	Cryptobranchus alleganiensis bishopi	Critically imperiled	Sometimes raised to species status, but usually considered a subspecies of eastern hellbender	Formerly more widespread through northern Arkansas, now restricted to Eleven Point River in northern Randolph County

Family: Plethodontidae - lungless salamanders

Image	Common name	Scientific name	Status	Notes	Distribution
	Ouachita dusky salamander	Desmognathus brimleyorum Stejneger, 1895	Secure		Western and central Arkansas
	Spotted dusky salamander	Desmognathus conanti Rossman, 1958	Possibly extirpated		Possibly extirpated, formerly found along eastern edge of Crowley's Ridge in eastern Arkansas
	Seal salamander	Desmognathus monticola Dunn, 1916	Introduced		Introduced to Spavinaw Creek in Benton County
	Southern grotto salamander	Eurycea braggi (Smith, 1968)	Not assessed, least concern by IUCN	Endemic or mostly endemic to Arkansas; Forms a species complex with E. spelaea and E. nerea, only distinguished by range or genetic testing	Between Beaver Lake and the Strawberry River on the Ozark Plateau
	Spotted-tail salamander	Eurycea lucifuga Rafinesque, 1822	Apparently secure		Northern Arkansas, west of the Black River
	Dark-sided salamander	Eurycea melanopleura (Cope, 1894)	Not assessed		Northern Arkansas, west of the Black River
	Many-ribbed salamander	Eurycea multiplicata (Cope, 1869)	Secure		Western-central Arkansas
	Northern grotto salamander	Eurycea nerea (Bishop, 1944)	Not assessed, least concern by IUCN	Forms a species complex with E. spelaea and E. braggi, only distinguished by range or genetic testing	Between the Current River and Strawberry River, possibly further locations to the west
	Western dwarf salamander	Eurycea paludicola (Mittleman, 1947)	Vulnerable		Southern Arkansas
	Western grotto salamander	Eurycea spelaea (Stejneger, 1892)	Vulnerable	Forms a species complex with E. nerea and E. braggi, only distinguished by range or genetic testing	West of the White River in Benton County and Washington County
	Ouachita streambed salamander	Eurycea subfluvicola Bonnett, 2014	Critically imperiled	Endemic to Arkansas	Lake Catherine State Park, Hot Spring County
	Oklahoma salamander	Eurycea tynerensis Moore & Hughes, 1939	Vulnerable		Northern and northwestern Arkansas
	Four-toed salamander	Hemidactylium scutatum (Temminck, 1838	Imperiled		Western Arkansas in central Ouachita Mountains, distinct population in Cleburne County
	Western slimy salamander	Plethodon albagula Grobman, 1944	Apparently secure	Forms a species complex with P. kiamichi and P. kisatchie	Northern, central, and eastern Arkansas, with a disjointed population centered around Bradley County
	Ozark zigzag salamander	Plethodon angusticlavius Grobman, 1944	Vulnerable		Northwestern and north-central Arkansas
	Caddo Mountain salamander	Plethodon caddoensis C. H. Pope & S. H. Pope, 1951	Imperiled	Endemic to Arkansas	Western part of the Caddo Mountain range within the Ouachita Mountains
	Fourche Mountain salamander	Plethodon fourchensis Duncan & Highton, 1979	Imperiled	Endemic to Arkansas	Fourche and Iron Forks mountain ranges within the Ouachita Mountains
	Kiamichi slimy salamander	Plethodon kiamichi Highton, 1989	Critically imperiled	Forms a species complex with P. albagula and P. kisatchie	Eastern edge of Kiamichi Mountains in Polk County, Scott County, and Sebastian County
	Louisiana slimy salamander	Plethodon kisatchie Highton, 1989	Imperiled	Forms a species complex with P. albagula and P. kiamichi	Southern shore of Ouachita River in Union County
	Rich Mountain salamander	Plethodon ouachitae Dunn & Heinze, 1933	Imperiled		Ouachita Mountains in northern Sevier County and a small part of bordering Polk County
	Sequoyah slimy salamander	Plethodon sequoyah Highton, 1989	Critically imperiled		Sevier County
	Southern red-backed salamander	Plethodon serratus Grobman, 1944	Vulnerable		Most of the Ouachita Mountains in western Arkansas

Family: Proteidae - mudpuppies

Image	Common name	Scientific name	Status	Notes	Distribution
	Red River mudpuppy	Necturus louisianensis Viosca, 1938	Secure	Phylogeny and distribution of the mudpuppies is poorly understood	Most major rivers, lakes, and streams throughout the state, Red River and Mississippi River populations may represent different species

Family: Salamandridae - newts

Image	Common name	Scientific name	Status	Notes	Distribution	
	Central newt	Notophthalmus viridescens louisianensis (Wolterstorff, 1914)	Secure (Note: Ranked at species level rather than subspecies level in Arkansas)	Non-nominate subspecies		Essentially statewide, more scattered throughout eastern part of Arkansas

Family: Sirenidae - sirens

Image	Common name	Scientific name	Status	Notes	Distribution
	Western lesser siren	Siren nettingi Goin, 1942	Secure	Formerly considered conspecific with Siren intermedia	Southern, central, and eastern Arkansas

== Species potentially in Arkansas ==
Some species are unconfirmed in Arkansas but may occur. Many of these species are separated from Arkansas by the Mississippi River, and may be common in the bordering regions of Mississippi and Tennessee. Other species may be hypothesized to occur in the state but are not confirmed. Some have gene flow and form species hybrids in the state with a more widespread species, but purebred members of one of the hybrid parent species are not confirmed.

- Rocky Mountain toad (Anaxyrus woodhousii woodhousii) - Gene flow between this species and A. fowleri has been recorded in southwest Arkansas, but no purebred members of this species have been found.
- Eastern cricket frog (Acris crepitans) - Widespread east of the Mississippi River, but not recorded west of it.
- Southern cricket frog (Acris gryllus) - Widespread east of the Mississippi River, but not recorded west of it.
- Upland chorus frog (Pseudacris feriarum) - Widespread east of the Mississippi River, but not recorded west of it; may occupy regions in the northeast.
- Catahoula spotted dusky salamander (Desmognathus catahoula) - Recently described species known from eastern Texas and northern Louisiana. Its range may extend into southern Arkansas.
- Southern two-lined salamander (Eurycea cirrigera) - Widespread east of the Mississippi River, but not recorded west of it.
- Three-lined salamander (Eurycea guttolineata) - Widespread east of the Mississippi River, but not recorded west of it.
- Long-tailed salamander (Eurycea longicauda) - Some gene flow with the dark-sided salamander (Eurycea melanopleura) around Randolph County is reportedly from this species, but this species has not been confirmed in Arkansas.
- Mississippi slimy salamander (Plethodon mississippi) - Widespread east of the Mississippi River and especially near Memphis but not recorded west of the Mississippi River.
- Western waterdog (Necturus beyeri) - Red River and Mississippi River populations of Necturus louisianensis may be this species.
