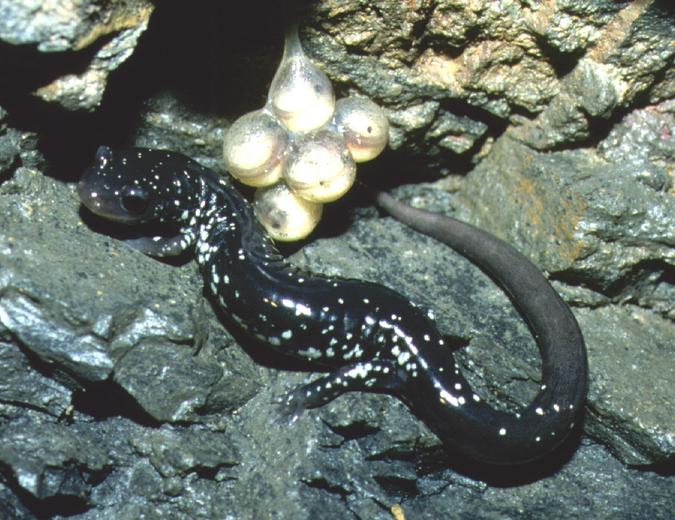

Conservation status
- Least Concern (IUCN 3.1)

Scientific classification
- Kingdom: Animalia
- Phylum: Chordata
- Class: Amphibia
- Order: Urodela
- Family: Plethodontidae
- Genus: Plethodon
- Species: P. albagula

Binomial name
- Plethodon albagula Grobman, 1944

Synonyms
- Plethodon glutinosus albagula Grobman, 1944

= Western slimy salamander =

Species of amphibian

The western slimy salamander (Plethodon albagula), also known as the whitethroat slimy salamander or white-throated slimy salamander, is a species of salamander. It is endemic to the United States of America and found in two disjunct populations, one from Missouri to Oklahoma, and Arkansas, and another in south-central Texas.

== Description ==
The western slimy salamander is typically black in color with white speckling. On some specimens, the white speckling turns into large, white blotches along the sides of their bodies. They have large, bulbous eyes and long tails.

== Behavior ==
Primarily nocturnal, it is commonly found under rocks, or other ground debris in moist, wooded areas. Eggs are laid in damp protected locations. The species has no aquatic larval stage. They are a shy species of salamander and are not normally found in areas where humans frequent. They live in areas of high humidity levels.
