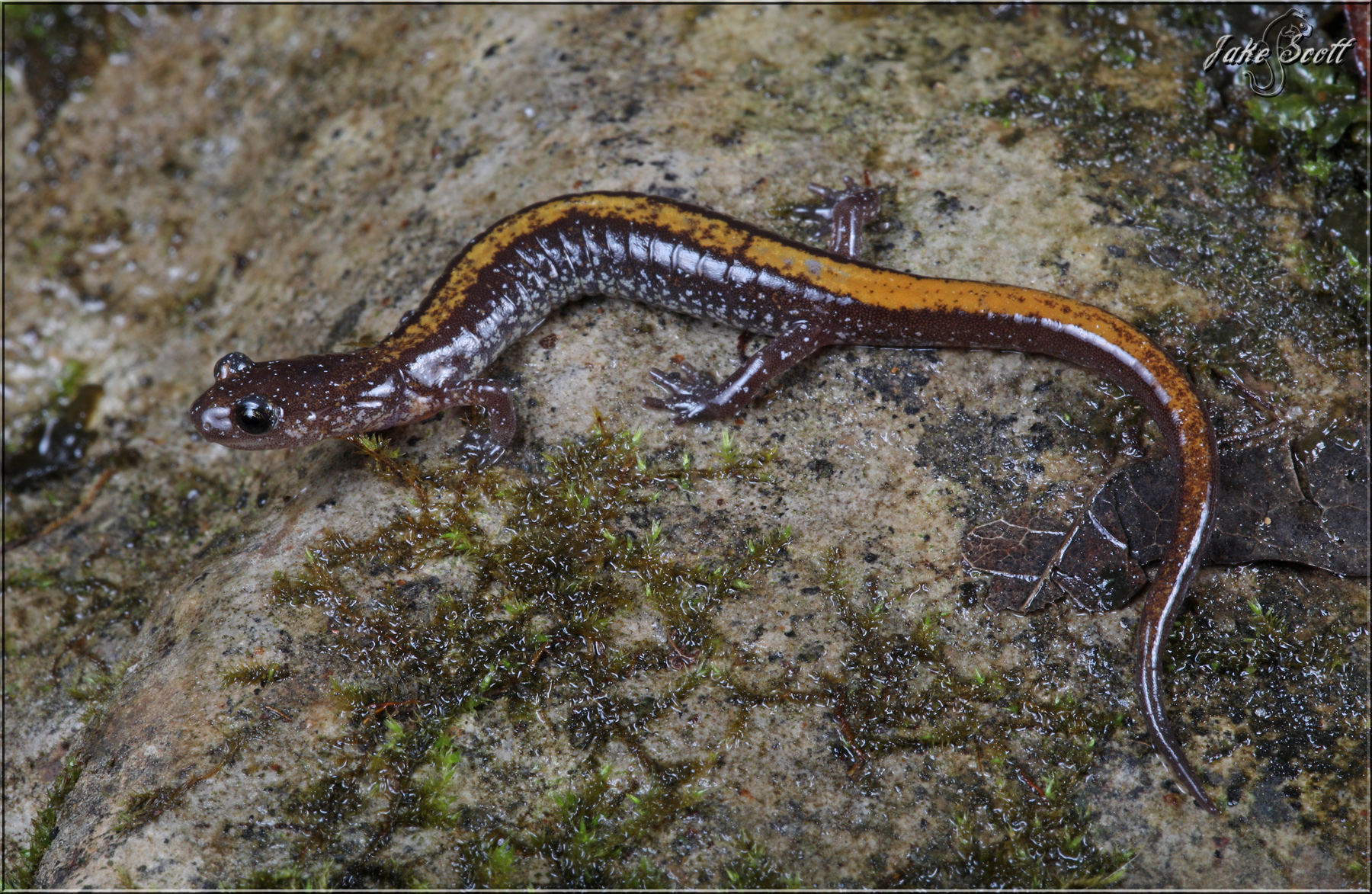

Conservation status
- Least Concern (IUCN 3.1)

Scientific classification
- Kingdom: Animalia
- Phylum: Chordata
- Class: Amphibia
- Order: Urodela
- Family: Plethodontidae
- Genus: Plethodon
- Species: P. angusticlavius

Binomial name
- Plethodon angusticlavius Grobman, 1944

= Ozark zigzag salamander =

Species of amphibian

The Ozark zigzag salamander (Plethodon angusticlavius) is a species of salamander in the family Plethodontidae endemic to the United States. It is one of 57 species in the genus Plethodon. Its natural habitats are temperate forests, freshwater springs, rocky areas, and caves. It is threatened by habitat loss.

They are found in southern Missouri and northern Arkansas.
