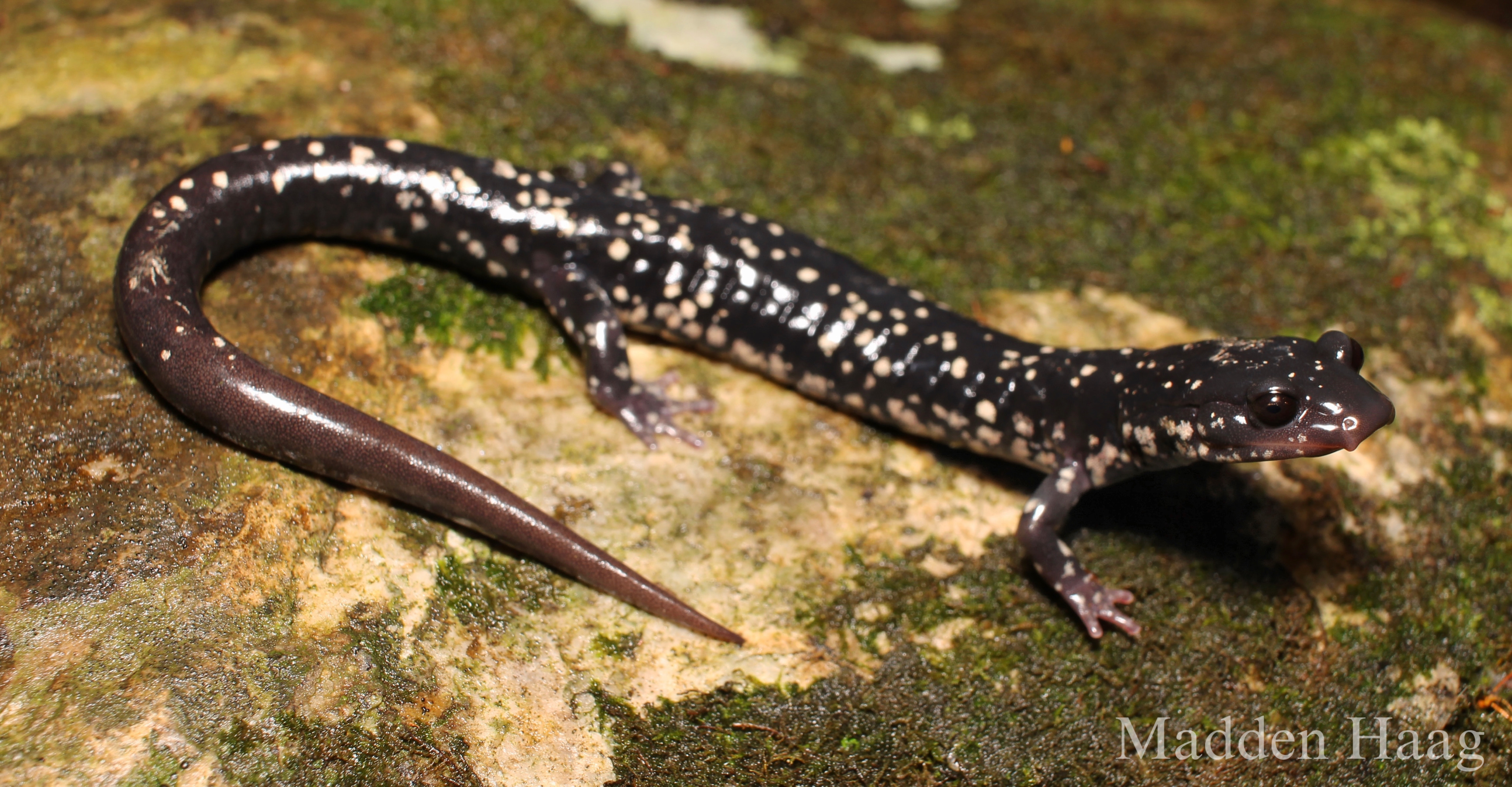

Conservation status
- Data Deficient (IUCN 3.1)

- Imperiled (NatureServe)

Scientific classification
- Kingdom: Animalia
- Phylum: Chordata
- Class: Amphibia
- Order: Urodela
- Family: Plethodontidae
- Genus: Plethodon
- Species: P. sequoyah

Binomial name
- Plethodon sequoyah Highton, 1989

= Sequoyah slimy salamander =

Species of amphibian

The Sequoyah slimy salamander (Plethodon sequoyah) is a species of salamander in the family Plethodontidae.

It is endemic to the Ouachita Mountains in the United States, where it is only known from Beavers Bend State Park in Oklahoma (although specimens possibly from the same species have been taken from outside the park) as well as a small portion of extreme southwestern Arkansas. There is some doubt as to whether it is distinct from the northern slimy salamander (P. glutinosus). Its natural habitat is temperate forests.
