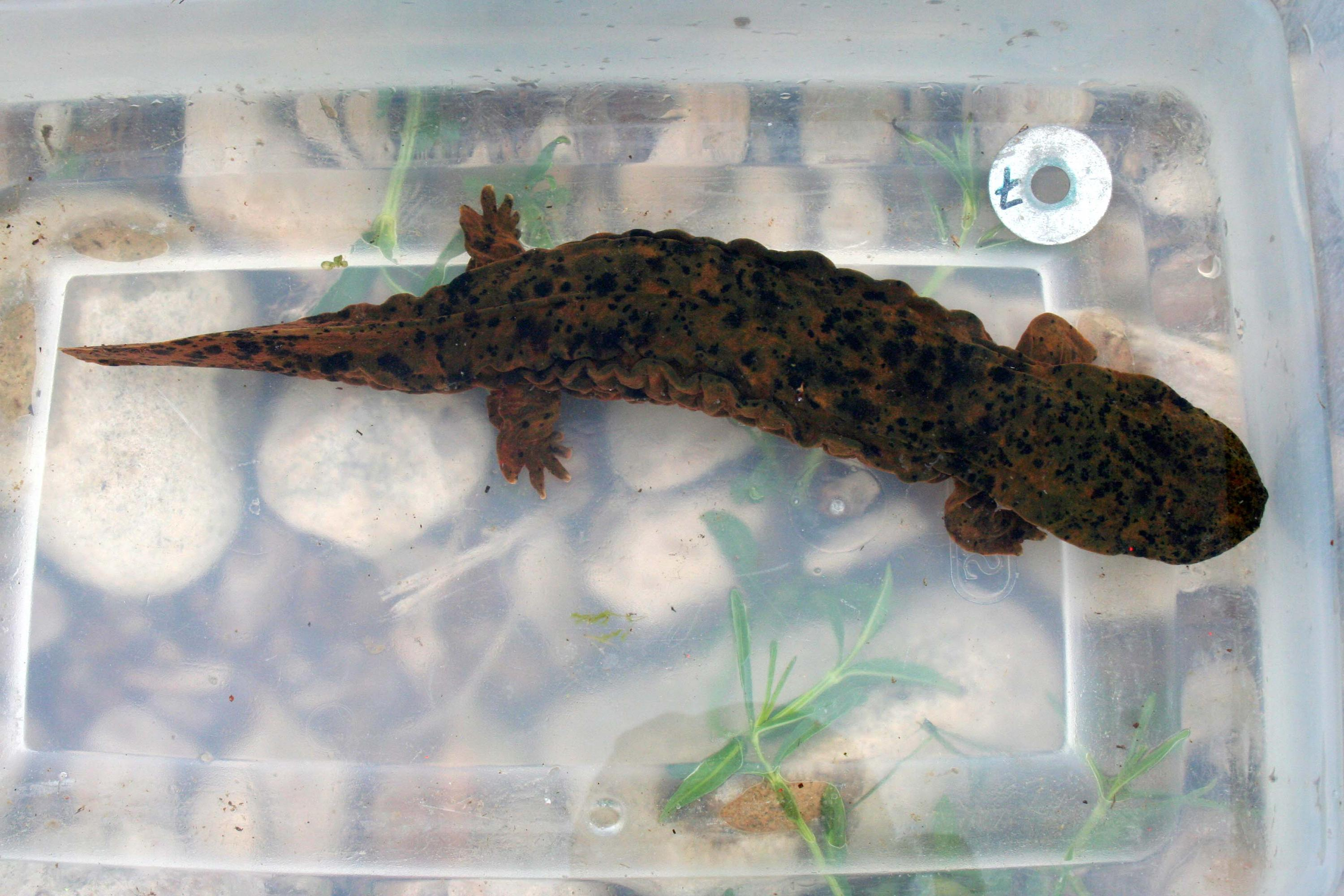

Conservation status
- Critically Imperiled (NatureServe)

- Endangered (ESA)

Scientific classification
- Kingdom: Animalia
- Phylum: Chordata
- Class: Amphibia
- Order: Urodela
- Family: Cryptobranchidae
- Genus: Cryptobranchus
- Species: C. alleganiensis
- Subspecies: C. a. bishopi

Trinomial name
- Cryptobranchus alleganiensis bishopi Grobman, 1943
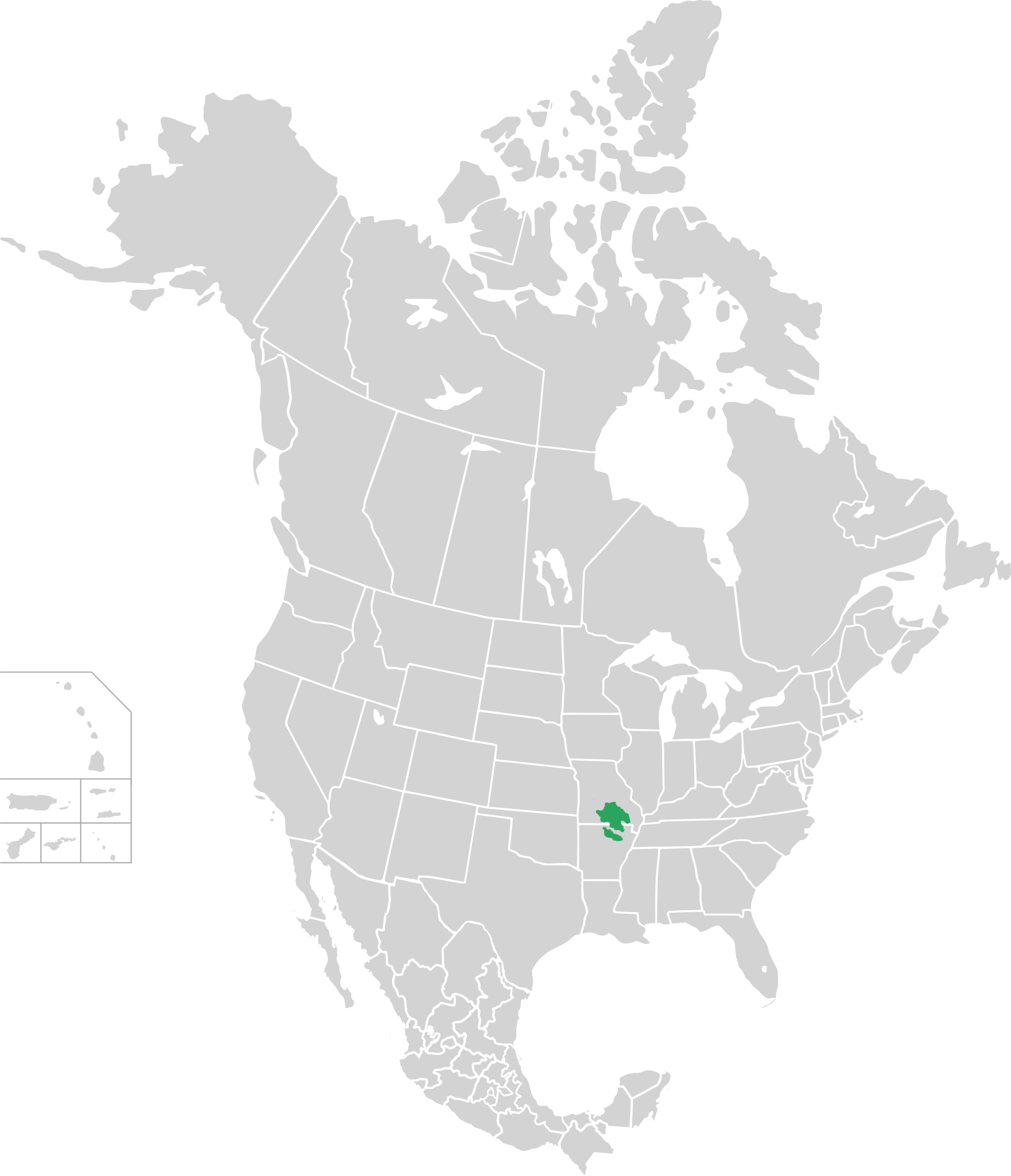
- Distribution map of the Ozark hellbender

= Ozark hellbender =

Subspecies of amphibian

The Ozark hellbender (Cryptobranchus alleganiensis bishopi) is a subspecies of the hellbender (Cryptobranchus alleganiensis). The subspecies is strictly native to the mountain streams of the Ozark Plateau in southern Missouri and northern Arkansas. Its nicknames include lasagna lizard and snot otter. This large salamander grows to a total length (including tail) of 29–57 cm (11–22 in) over a lifespan of 30 years. The Ozark hellbender is a nocturnal predator that hides under large flat rocks and primarily consumes crayfish and small fish. As of 2011, the U.S. Fish and Wildlife Service (USFWS) has listed the subspecies as endangered under the Endangered Species Act of 1973. The population decline of the subspecies is caused by habitat destruction and modification, overutilization, disease and predation, and low reproductive rates. Conservation programs have been put in place to help protect the subspecies.

== Taxonomy ==
Two distinct members of the family Cryptobranchidae, also known as "giant salamanders," are found in the United States, the eastern hellbender (Cryptobranchus a. alleganiensis), and the Ozark hellbender (Cryptobranchus a. bishopi).

== Description ==
The Ozark hellbender is known for its primitive body design and its large size. It has small eyes, a keeled tail, and a flat body to assist in movement in rivers and streams. It has folds along its sides that assist in respiration, as oxygen is able to diffuse across the skin. It is a strictly aquatic subspecies, even though it technically lacks gills. It grows to a total length (including tail) of about 29–57 cm (11–22 in).

== Distribution and habitat ==
The Ozark hellbender is endemic to the White River drainage in northern Arkansas and southern Missouri. Historically it has been found in portions of the Spring, White, Black, Eleven Point, and Current rivers and their tributaries. The Ozark hellbender is now considered extirpated in the mainstem White, Black, and Spring rivers and Jacks Fork, and with its range being considerably reduced in the remaining rivers and tributaries.

The Ozark hellbender is declining throughout its range with no population appearing to be stable throughout its range. It is unknown whether a viable population exists in the mainstem of the White River, where few individuals have been found. Much of the potential habitat along this river has been destroyed by a series of dams constructed on the upper portion of the river in the 1940s and 1950s. The North Fork White River has historically contained a high population of the Ozark hellbender and was considered the strong point for the subspecies, with a mark and recapture study in 1973 marking 1,150 individuals within a 1.7-mile (2.7-kilometer) reach of the river. In recent years, this population is now beginning to experience a decline similar to those populations in other rivers. The overall population of the Ozark hellbender is known to be in decline, with an estimated population of 600 in Missouri and 200 in Arkansas as of 2014.

There is currently no critical habitat designated for the Ozark hellbender.

The Ozark hellbender is frequently found underneath large flat rocks in rocky, fast flowing streams in the Ozark Plateau at depths from less than 1 m (3.3 ft) to 3 m (9.8 ft). It is primarily nocturnal, remaining undercover until nightfall. Hellbenders are habitat specialists that are dependent on consistent levels of dissolved oxygen, temperature, and water flow. Warmer stagnant waters with a low dissolved oxygen content do not meet the Ozark hellbender's respiratory needs. It has been observed that Ozark hellbenders in warm stagnant waters sway or rock in order to increase oxygen exposure.

== Ecology and behavior ==
Ozark hellbenders are nocturnal predators, remaining beneath rock cover during the day and emerging to forage at night, primarily on crayfish. They become diurnal during the breeding season, searching for mates. They are highly sedentary, moving very little throughout their entire lifespan. Ozark hellbenders are territorial and will defend their cover from other hellbenders.

They have been recorded living 25 to 30 years in the wild and grow slowly over time. Wild Ozark hellbender populations are dominated by these older and larger individuals. Female Ozark hellbenders have been found to mature at 6 to 8 years old, while males tend to mature at around 5 years of age. Some of the issues that Ozark hellbenders have in reproduction come from their late sexual maturity.

Typically, Ozark hellbenders breed in mid-October, although certain populations that live in the Spring River area tend to procreate in the winter. Paternal care is present in this subspecies, even though it is rare to see this in tetrapods. The males are responsible for preparing the nests and ultimately guarding the eggs. They build nests under submerged logs, flat rocks, or within bedrocks. Hellbenders mate via external fertilization. Usually, around 138 to 450 eggs are present per nest, and they hatch after approximately 80 days. Once the eggs hatch, the larvae and juveniles hide under small and large rocks in gravel beds. Ozark hellbenders are highly sedentary creatures, meaning that neither males nor females have long distance dispersal rates.

== Conservation status ==
=== The Endangered Species Act of 1973 ===
The Ozark hellbender became a candidate for listing under the Endangered Species Act in 2001. It was assigned a priority level of 6 for threats due to habitat loss and fragmentation because of human activity and pollution. In 2005 the Fish and Wildlife Service increased its listing priority number to a 3 because of increased pressures on the species from recreation activity in their habitat including gigging and boat traffic, and increases in the contamination of their waters. The USFWS put forth the proposed rule to list the Ozark hellbender as endangered under the ESA in September 2010, and the listing of the species as endangered became effective November 7, 2011. In April 2017, a five-year review of the subspecies’ status was initiated.

=== IUCN ===
The subspecies of C. a. bishopi does not currently have its own IUCN listing, but the species C. alleganiensis was listed as near threatened in April 2004.

== Threats ==
=== Human impact ===
The construction of reservoirs in the White River has destroyed Ozark hellbender habitats and separated their populations. These reservoirs also increase predation and the deposition of silt upstream from the reservoir, both of which threaten hellbenders. Siltation endangers the larval salamanders because it fills in the gravel stream beds where they live, reducing their ability to find food and hide from predators. Silt can also destroy their eggs. Agricultural and construction runoff, waste disposal, and mining activity within the hellbender’s range pollute and degrade their habitat and threaten hellbender survival. Mining is especially detrimental as it increases zinc and leads hellbender habitats to dangerously high levels for aquatic life. Human and livestock waste from the areas surrounding hellbender habitats have further decreased water quality. Pollution is readily taken up by hellbenders due to the absorptive properties of their skin and decreases in water quality can make rivers and streams unlivable for this subspecies.

Recreation in Ozark hellbender habitats also harms populations. Boat traffic, including canoes, kayaks, and motor boats may injure or kill hellbenders and further degrade their habitat.

Additionally, direct removal from the environment has contributed to the decline of the Ozark hellbender. While Missouri and Arkansas have decreased or stopped issuing permits for scientific collection since the 1990s, illegal harvesting for the pet trade has continued. The Ozark hellbender also experiences predation from non-native rainbow and brown trout stocked in river for sport fishing.

=== Other threats ===
Like most amphibians globally, the Ozark hellbender is at risk of chytridiomycosis, a very infectious amphibian fungal disease. Individuals carrying the causal pathogen Batrachochytrium dendrobatidis have been detected in all surveyed C. a. bishopi populations. Additionally, unusual physical abnormalities have been observed in Ozark hellbenders in recent years, such as missing limbs or eyes and epidermal lesions, with increasing frequency, although the cause of these deformities is currently unknown.

The small size of Ozark hellbender populations combined with their isolation from each other puts them at greater risk of extinction, as does the documented loss of genetic diversity within those populations. They also suffer from very low reproductive rates as a result of their late sexual maturity and long lifespans. Their late sexual maturity makes them more likely to die before reproducing and the time between generations is extended when reproduction does occur. Very low numbers of juvenile Ozark hellbenders in most populations confirm these problems. These threats are further worsened when combined with the other threats to this subspecies.

Fish stocking for recreational purposes increases the abundance of these potential predators of Ozark hellbenders. Prey-seeking behavior of walleye and brown trout increases when these fish are exposed to Ozark hellbender alarm secretions, but it is unclear if the secretions may function to deter predation in a natural environment.

== Conservation efforts ==
The decline of the Ozark hellbender was first recognized in the 1990s. Since then, the Arkansas Game and Fish Commission (AGFC) and Missouri Department of Conservation (MDC) have begun to track the health and wellbeing of the creatures. They also study trends in their size and overall presence in their natural habitat. From this information, they are able to predict population trends. Since this species is now considered endangered, there is more effort to protect the habitat and populations of the Ozark hellbender. Both USFWS and State agencies have enacted laws and policies to aid in hellbender protection.

The most popular conservation strategy for the Ozark hellbender is captive breeding and reintroduction back into their natural habitats. There is currently only one successful example of captive breeding, which is taking place in the Saint Louis Zoo. In regards to hellbender release after captive breeding, planning should include data on genetic information and the presence of chytrid fungus and other pathogens. Since there is little gene flow or genetic variation in the subspecies, it is hard to continue to build their numbers due to negative consequences from inbreeding. Some scientists suggest research into their genetic delineations for answers. Not much is known about their genetic history. Many scientists also suggest that translocation should not be a part of Ozark hellbender conservation plans, since they are habitat specialists and haven’t had translocation success in the past. Other current conservation plans include population monitoring, protecting populations and habitat, and disease assessment and treatment

Due to the impact of disease on the Ozark hellbender populations, there is more effort to study the physical deformities of the hellbenders affected by disease, as well as understanding how diseases cause the deformities. Research is also exploring the effects of the amphibian chytrid fungus. Heat treatment has seen some success as a method of treating chytrid cases.

Other than captive release programs, the recommended way to meet the recovery needs of Ozark hellbenders is to protect and clean their habitat. It is necessary to decrease sedimentation and to protect areas where Ozark hellbenders reproduce.
