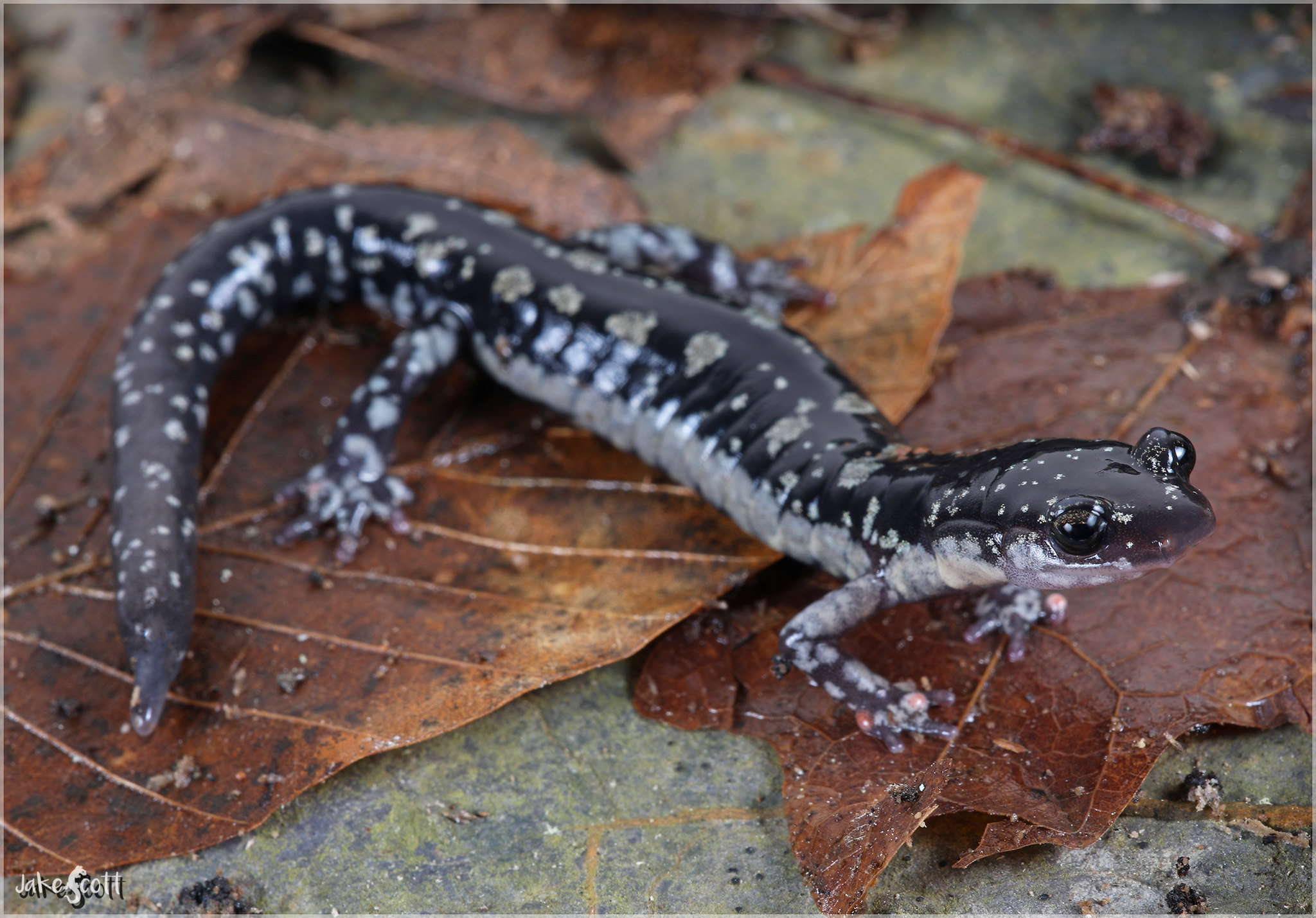

Conservation status
- Near Threatened (IUCN 3.1)

Scientific classification
- Kingdom: Animalia
- Phylum: Chordata
- Class: Amphibia
- Order: Urodela
- Family: Plethodontidae
- Genus: Plethodon
- Species: P. fourchensis

Binomial name
- Plethodon fourchensis Duncan & Highton, 1979

= Fourche Mountain salamander =

Species of amphibian

The Fourche Mountain salamander (Plethodon fourchensis) is a species of salamander in the family Plethodontidae endemic to the Ouachita Mountains in the central United States. Its natural habitat is temperate forests and it is threatened by habitat loss.

== Description ==
The Fourche Mountain salamander is medium-sized species with a black background color and varying amounts of small brassy or cream colored spots and two rows of larger, irregular blotches along the dorsum (back). The underside is dark with small lighter spots and a pale chin.

== Distribution and habitat ==
The Fourche Mountain salamander only occurs in the Fourche Mountains, the Shut-In Mountains, and the eastern side of Irons Fork Mountain in the Ouachita Mountain range in Arkansas and eastern Oklahoma. It is found in deciduous woodland high in the mountains especially in ravines and on north-facing slopes. It sometimes hybridizes with the Rich Mountain salamander (P. ouachitae) where their ranges overlap on the western side of Fourche Mountain.

== Biology ==
The Fourche Mountain salamander hides in undergrowth and under rocks and logs. It mainly feeds at night on small invertebrates such as insects, spiders, and worms. Between May and September when the weather is hot and dry, it may aestivate underground, emerging to forage during any wet periods that may occur. It probably hibernates between November and March. Little is known of its breeding habits, but they are likely to be similar to the Rich Mountain salamander. The eggs are laid in underground chambers and brooded by the female, no aqueous larval stage exists and direct development takes place into juvenile salamanders. Females may breed in the fall or winter in alternate years. Once considered part of P. ouachitae, Plethodon fourchensis was described in 1979 based on genetic differences and geographical distinction.

== Status ==
The Fourche Mountain salamander is listed as near threatened in the IUCN Red List of Threatened Species. Within its range, it is often locally abundant, but its restricted distribution make it susceptible to disturbance and habitat degradation. Some protection is provided because its entire range occurs within the Ouachita National Forest.
