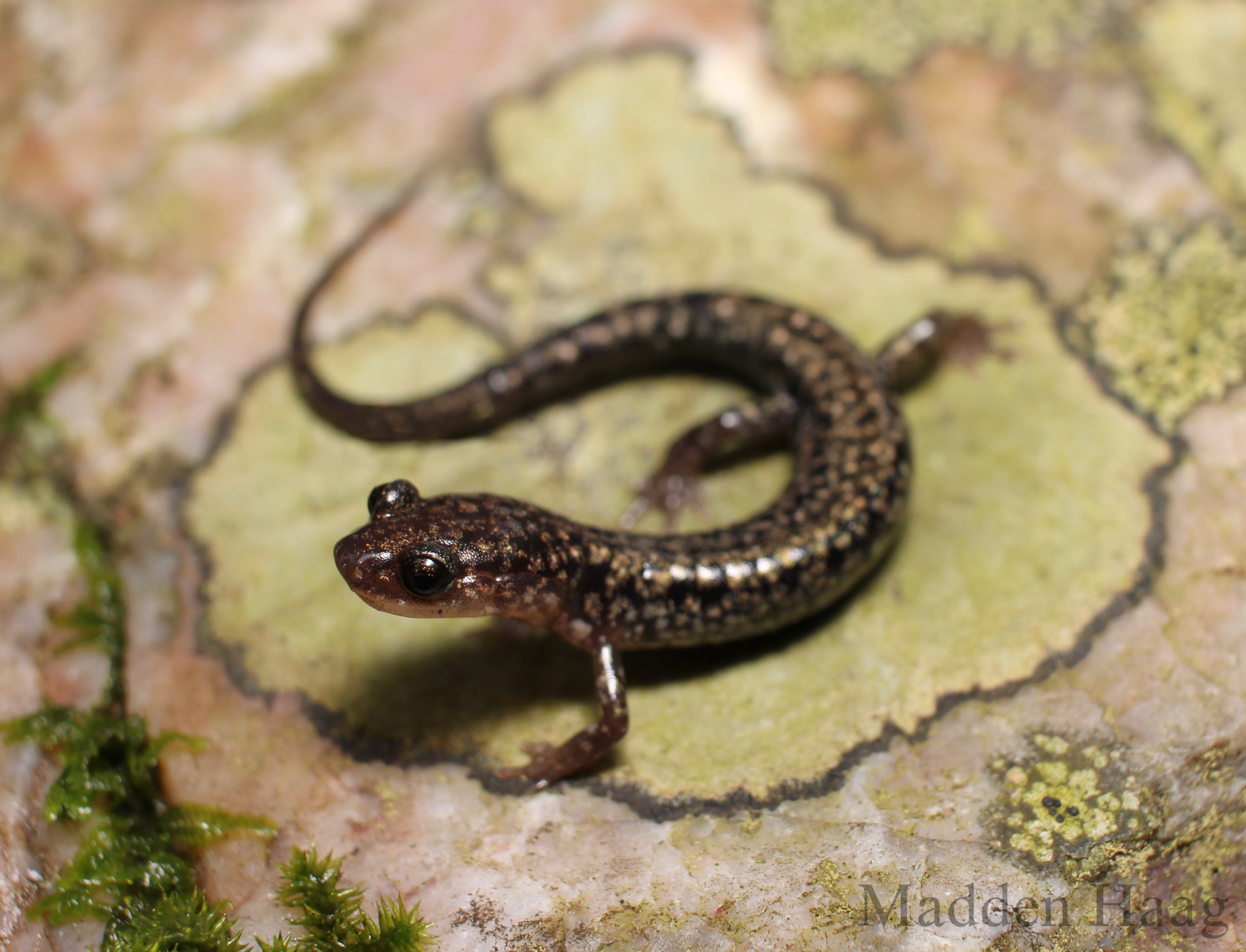
- This salamander was underneath a rock.

Conservation status
- Near Threatened (IUCN 3.1)

Scientific classification
- Kingdom: Animalia
- Phylum: Chordata
- Class: Amphibia
- Order: Urodela
- Family: Plethodontidae
- Genus: Plethodon
- Species: P. caddoensis

Binomial name
- Plethodon caddoensis Pope and Pope, 1951

= Caddo Mountain salamander =

Species of amphibian

The Caddo Mountain salamander (Plethodon caddoensis) is a species of salamander in the family Plethodontidae endemic to Arkansas in the south-central United States, and only known from the Caddo Mountains, a part of the Ouachita Mountains.

The Caddo Mountain salamander has been found to be abundant in or near talus slopes and other rocky habitats, particularly on north-facing slopes covered by mature, mesic forests. It can also be found in secondary growth, mixed deciduous forests. During dry, hot conditions, these salamanders withdraw into underground retreats under shaded talus or in abandoned mines.

The Caddo Mountain salamander is abundant within its limited range. It can be locally threatened by habitat loss and degradation. However, most of the populations is within the Ouachita National Forest, which offers them some protection.
