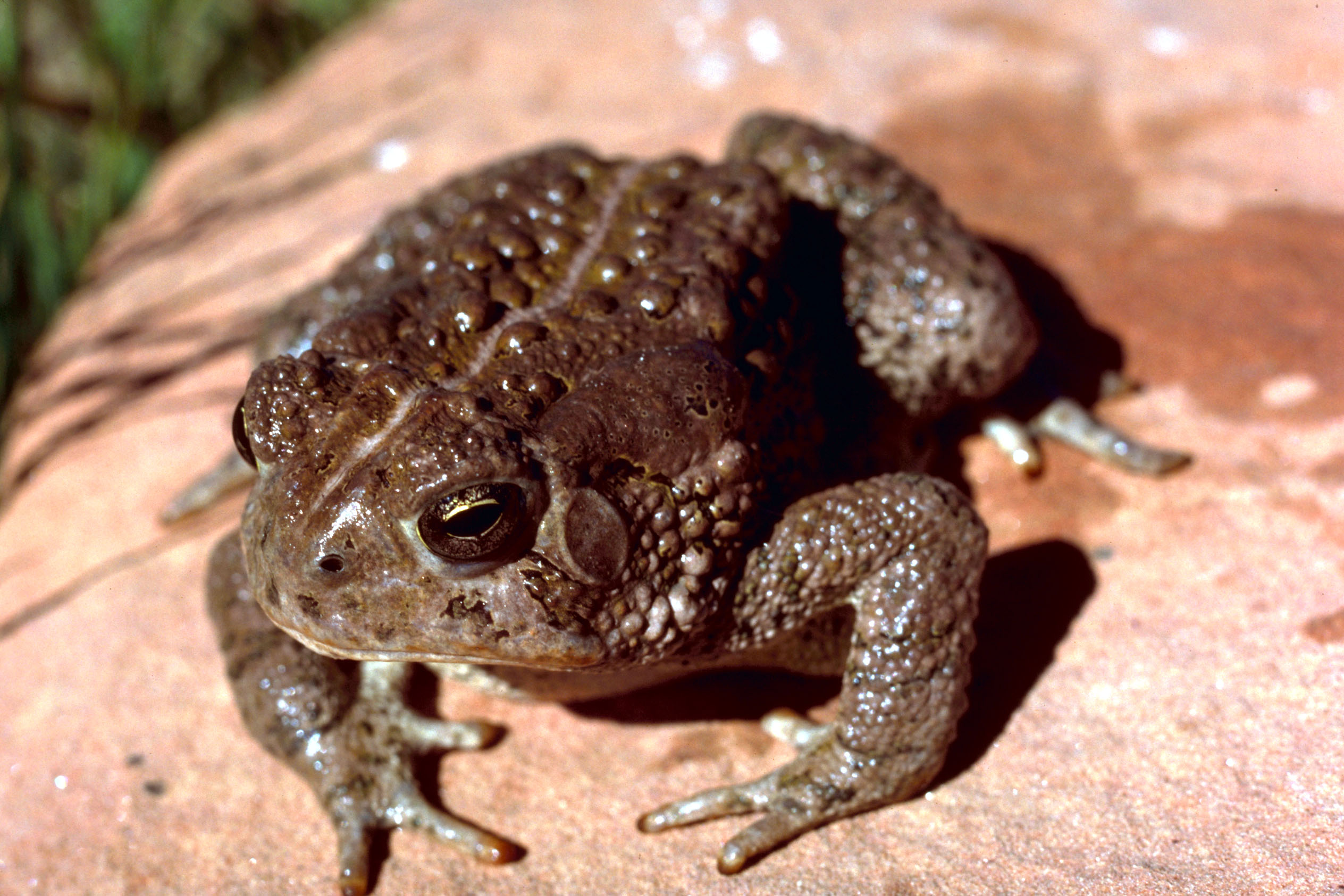

Scientific classification
- Kingdom: Animalia
- Phylum: Chordata
- Class: Amphibia
- Order: Anura
- Family: Bufonidae
- Genus: Anaxyrus
- Species: A. woodhousii
- Subspecies: A. w. woodhousii

Trinomial name
- Anaxyrus woodhousii woodhousii (Girard, 1854)

Synonyms
- Bufo woodhousii woodhousii Girard, 1854

= Rocky Mountain toad =

Subspecies of amphibian

The Rocky Mountain toad or western Woodhouse's toad (Anaxyrus woodhousii woodhousii) is a subspecies in the Woodhouse's toad subgroup. It can be identified by its light middorsal stripe, prominent cranial crests, and elongate parotoid glands. The belly is usually white or yellowish with dark flecks between the forelegs

== Range and habitat ==
This abundant amphibian ranges from the Dakotas and Montana to central Texas, then west of the Rocky Mts. from northern Utah to Central Arizona. Disjunct colonies can be found in several states. It inhabits marshes, swales, river bottoms, canyons, desert streams, irrigated areas, and suburban backyards. Nocturnal, it usually approaches lit areas where insects can easily be found.

== See also ==
- Anaxyrus woodhousii
