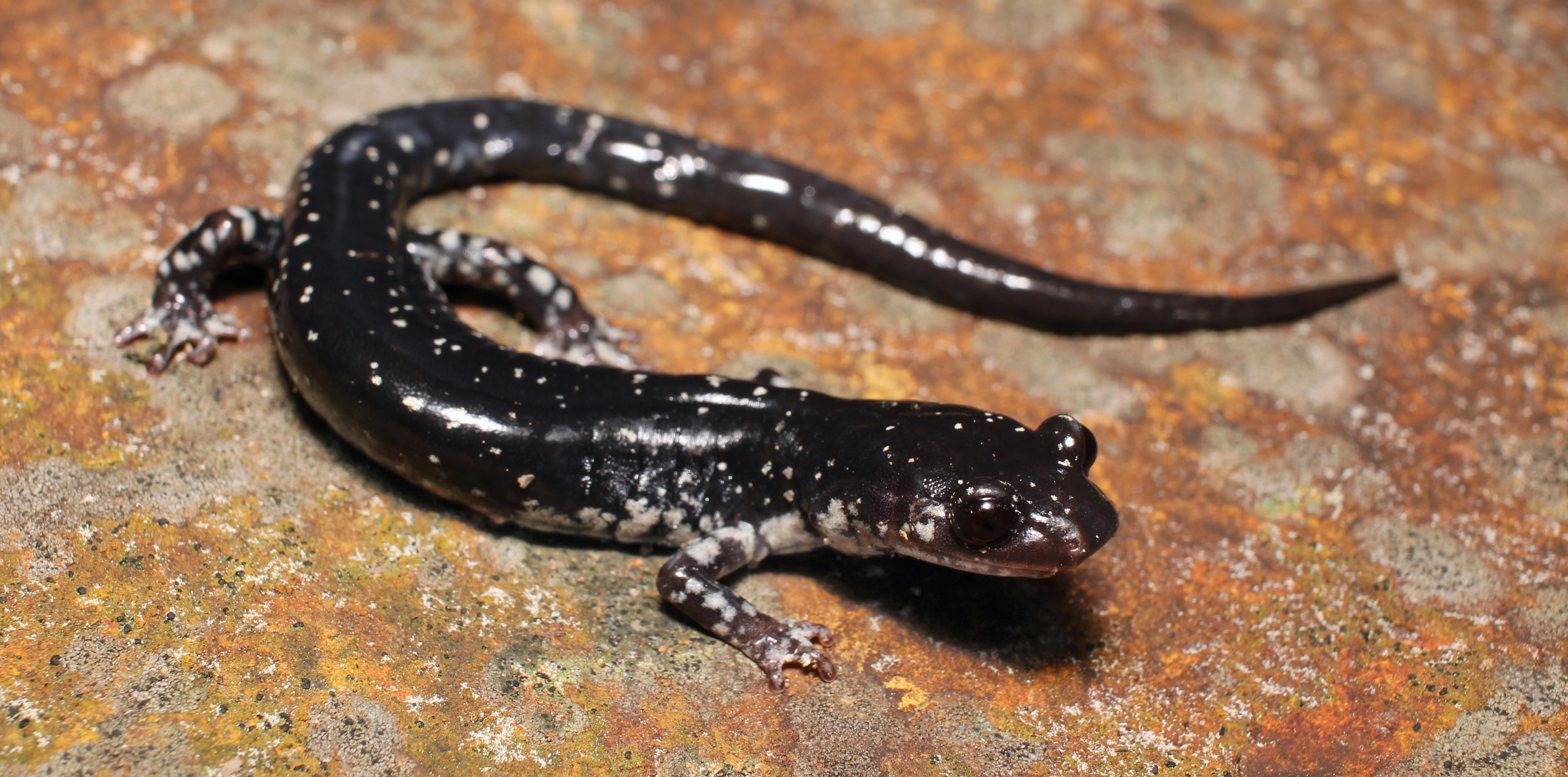
- This salamander was found walking along the edge of a rock.

Conservation status
- Vulnerable (IUCN 3.1)

Scientific classification
- Kingdom: Animalia
- Phylum: Chordata
- Class: Amphibia
- Order: Urodela
- Family: Plethodontidae
- Genus: Plethodon
- Species: P. kiamichi

Binomial name
- Plethodon kiamichi Highton, 1989

= Kiamichi slimy salamander =

Species of amphibian

The Kiamichi slimy salamander (Plethodon kiamichi) is a species of salamander in the family Plethodontidae endemic to the United States, has a natural habitat of temperate forests, and is found over a small range. This nocturnal species is mainly threatened by habitat loss and was first described by Highton in 1989. It is rated as a vulnerable species by the International Union for Conservation of Nature.

== Description ==
Adult specimens have been observed with lengths between 48 and 75 mm (1.9 and 3.0 in) and it feeds on spiders, worms, insects, and other small invertebrate animal species. It is a nocturnal species which assists it keeping from predators, and is thought to hibernate between the middle of November and towards the end of March. To prevent desiccation, the Kiamichi slimy salamander goes into burrows or under objects. It has terrestrial methods of reproduction and is mainly found near logs and rocks. Its skin creates secretions that are noxious, and it forms adhesive skin secretions when touched.

== Distribution ==
The Kiamichi slimy salamander is found in the Kiamichi Mountains and Round Mountains of Le Flore County, eastern Oklahoma and Polk County, western Arkansas, respectively. It is threatened by habitat loss (deforestation) and details regarding its population are unknown. The IUCN has rated its conservation status as data deficient due to the lack of information regarding the range and occurrence of the species. It occurs in ravines and moist forests mainly near logs and rocks and it might be common in a small area.

== Taxonomy ==
Plethodon kiamichi was described by Highton in 1989.
