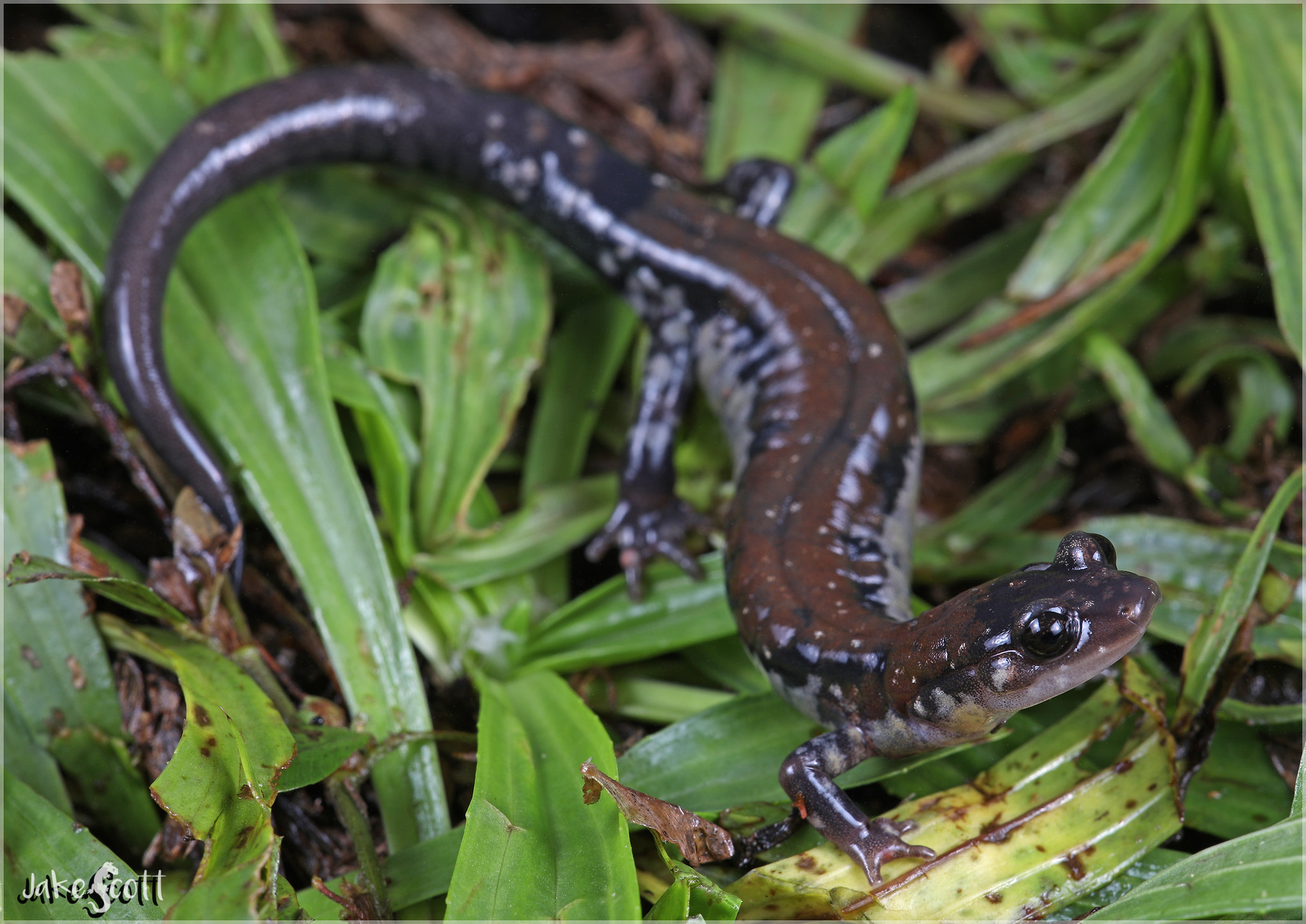

Conservation status
- Near Threatened (IUCN 3.1)

Scientific classification
- Kingdom: Animalia
- Phylum: Chordata
- Class: Amphibia
- Order: Urodela
- Family: Plethodontidae
- Genus: Plethodon
- Species: P. ouachitae

Binomial name
- Plethodon ouachitae Dunn & Heinze, 1933

= Rich Mountain salamander =

Species of amphibian

The Rich Mountain salamander (Plethodon ouachitae) is a species of salamander in the family Plethodontidae. It is endemic to the Ouachita Mountains in western Arkansas and eastern Oklahoma. Its natural habitat is temperate forests. It is threatened by habitat loss.

== Description ==
Rich Mountain salamanders grow to a length of about 5 centimetres (2.0 in), snout to vent. They are mottled and slatey-grey in colour which makes them inconspicuous. There are glands on their backs which secrete a noxious substance to deter predators. The distinct lineages present characteristic color variations, corresponding with the mountain range where found.

== Distribution and habitat ==
The Rich Mountain salamander was first collected at Rich Mountain east of Page, Oklahoma in the Ouachita Mountains. They only occur on six distinct mountains; Buffalo, Winding Stair, Black Fork, Kiamichi, Round, and Rich Mountain. It has been described as a sky island species due to the strict high elevation of the range. Where their range overlaps that of the Fourche Mountain salamander (Plethodon fourchensis), some hybridization occurs. Their habitat is mixed deciduous woodland particularly on north facing slopes near wet seeps. They are also found in the characteristic talus rock glaciers of the Ouachitas, under logs, rocks and debris and in cave entrances.

== Biology ==
The males defend territories and drive off other male salamanders. Breeding takes place in the late autumn, winter and early spring in burrows in scree and caves. About sixteen eggs are brooded by the female and hatch directly into juvenile salamanders without any intervening larval stage. The juveniles occupy the same habitat as the adults and both feed among the leaf litter on small invertebrates such as insects and their larvae, worms and spiders. They are largely nocturnal but sometimes move about by day in wet weather. The adults may aestivate from May till September though the juveniles remain active for at least part of this time. In the winter they probably hibernate and the females probably only breed every alternate year.

Due to the sky island nature of the species, isolation has caused several distinct lineages. The range include seven lineages, each corresponding to the mountain which the lineage is found, except the Kiamichi mountain lineage in which the west and east sides of the mountain make up two lineages. These lineages have distinct morphological differences as well. Some scholars believe that the genetic distinction of the lineages warrant subspecies or even species designation. This is not unprecedented, as P. fourchensis was considered as part of P. ouachitae until genetic differences found in 1979 warranted the distinction of P. fourchensis.

== Status ==
In the IUCN Red List of Threatened Species, the Rich Mountain salamander is considered to be "Near threatened". This is because, although it is abundant in parts of its range, there are a number of separate populations which could be impacted by local events. It is vulnerable to habitat destruction and clear felling but some of its range is in protected areas.

The range is mostly encompassed in Ouachita National Forest, however the majority of Buffalo Mountain is on private property, meaning the Buffalo Mountain lineage is at a higher risk.
