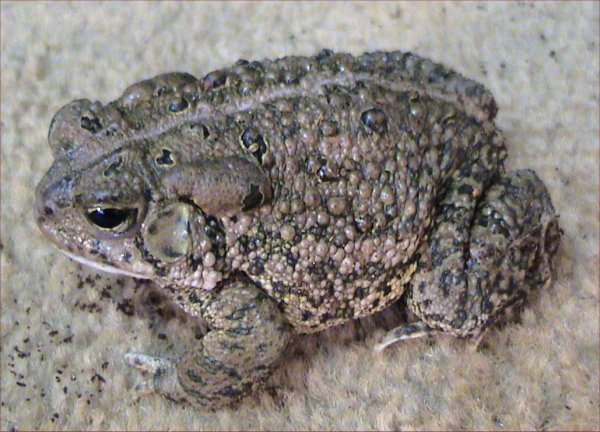

Conservation status
- Least Concern (IUCN 3.1)

Scientific classification
- Kingdom: Animalia
- Phylum: Chordata
- Class: Amphibia
- Order: Anura
- Family: Bufonidae
- Genus: Anaxyrus
- Species: A. woodhousii

Binomial name
- Anaxyrus woodhousii (Girard, 1854)
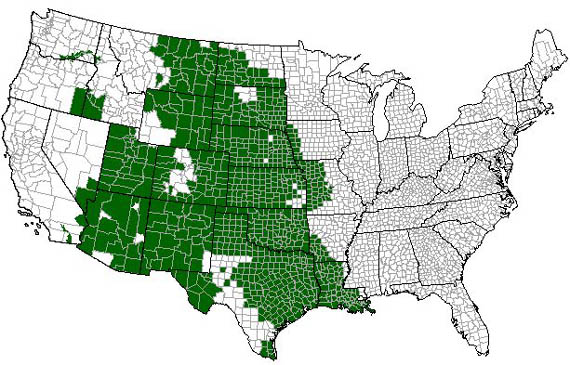
- United States range of A. woodhousii

Synonyms
- Bufo woodhousii Girard, 1854

= Woodhouse's toad =

Species of amphibian

Woodhouse's toad (Anaxyrus woodhousii) is a medium-sized (4 inches or 10 centimetres) true toad native to the United States and Mexico. There are three recognized subspecies. A. woodhousii tends to hybridize with Anaxyrus americanus where their ranges overlap.

== Taxonomy ==
Woodhouse's toad was first described in 1854 by the French herpetologist Charles Frédéric Girard. He gave it the name Bufo woodhousii in honor of the American physician and naturalist Samuel Washington Woodhouse. The large genus Bufo was split by Frost et al. in 2006, with the North American species being included in the genus Anaxyrus and this toad becoming A. woodhousii. There are three recognised subspecies:

- Rocky Mountain toad – Anaxyrus woodhousii woodhousii (Girard, 1854)
- East Texas toad – Anaxyrus woodhousii velatus (Bragg and Sanders, 1951)
- Southwestern Woodhouse's toad – Anaxyrus woodhousii australis (Shannon & Lowe, 1955)

At one time, Fowler's toad (Anaxyrus fowleri) was considered to be a subspecies.

== Description ==
Woodhouse's toad is a robust amphibian and can grow to a maximum snout-vent length of 127 mm (5 in). The head has prominent cranial crests in front of and in between the eyes. The parotoid glands are long and large. The dorsal surface of this toad is grayish-brown or yellowish-brown and it is speckled with small dark spots. There is a narrow pale line running along the spine. The belly is rather paler and is usually unspotted. The male has a single vocal sac on his throat. His call resembles the bleat of a sheep and lasts from one to three seconds.

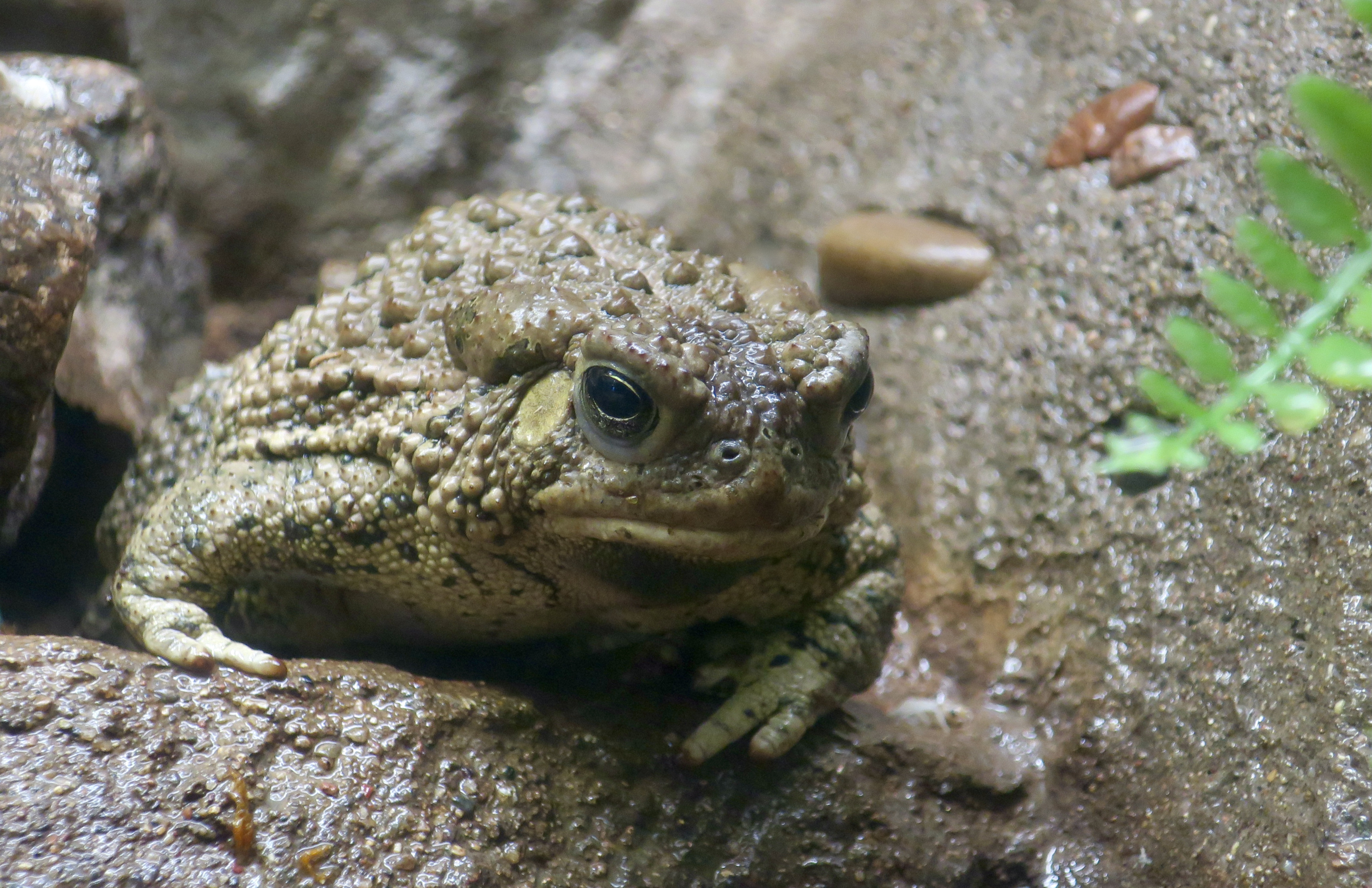
At Wildlife World Zoo.

== Distribution and habitat ==
Woodhouse's toad is found in North America at altitudes of up to 2,500 metres (8,200 ft). Its range extends from Mexico in the south to Washington in the north. In the United States it is found in Arizona, Arkansas, California, Colorado, Idaho, Kansas, Montana, Nebraska, Nevada, New Mexico, North Dakota, Oklahoma, Oregon, South Dakota, Texas, Utah, Washington, and Wyoming. In the western part of its range it is typically found in lowland riparian corridors, wooded land besides streams and rivers. At higher altitudes it inhabits wet meadows, ponds, reservoirs and lakes. It is also found in urban environments, canals, ponds and irrigated agricultural land.

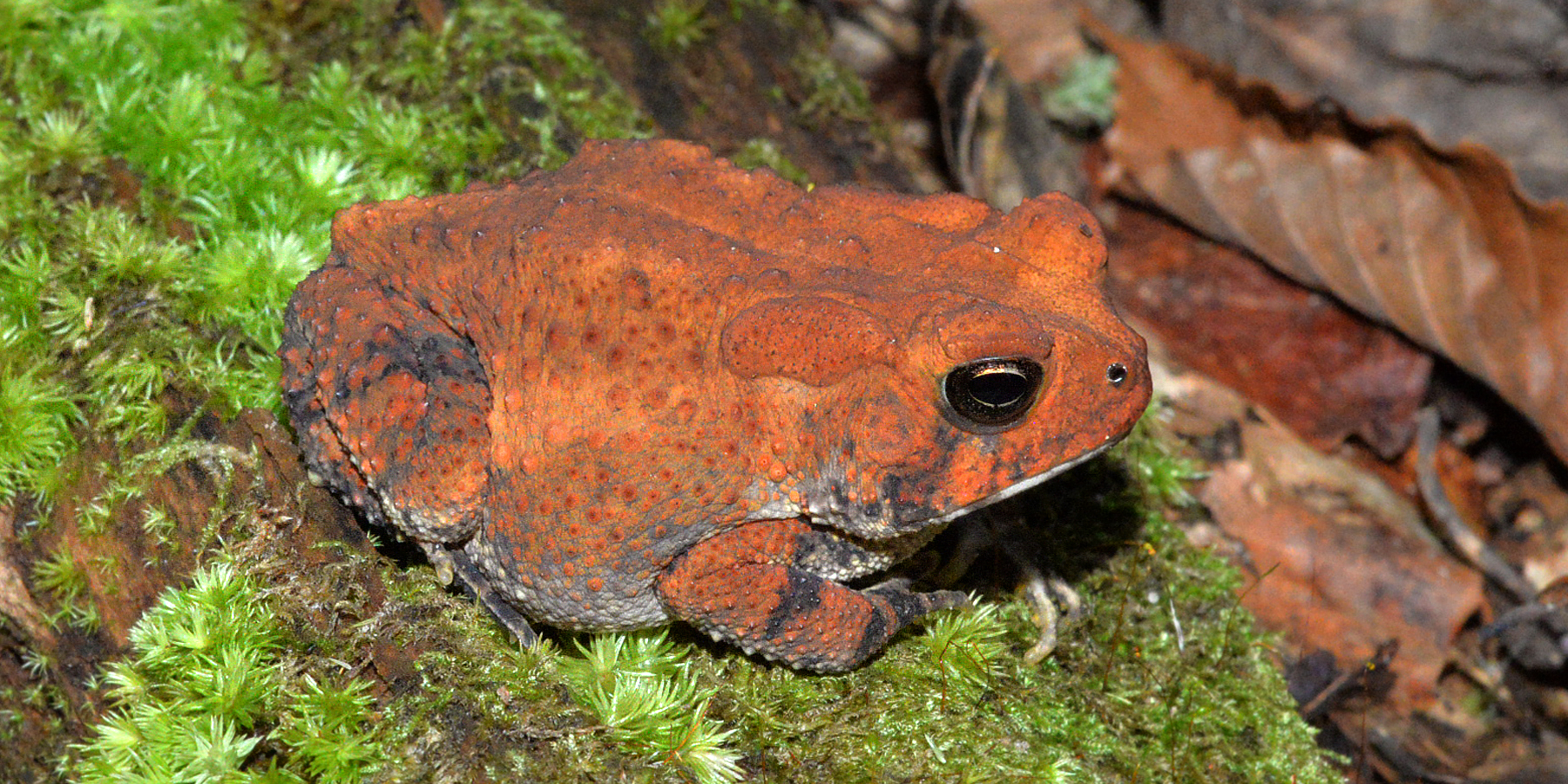
The East Texas toad was described as a subspecies, elevated to full species, and dismissed as a hybrid between A. woodhousei x A. fowleri without taxonomic status by others. Photographed in the Big Thicket National Preserve, Hardin Co. TX. USA, 2019.

== Behavior ==
Woodhouse's toad is nocturnal and feeds on insects and other small invertebrates. Near human habitations these toads may congregate underneath outside lights to feed on the insects they attract. Breeding takes place at different times of year in different parts of the range. The males call from in, or close to, standing water and the eggs are laid in gelatinous strings in still-water habitats such as ditches, ponds, pools, cattle tanks and lakes. The tadpoles typically take from five to eight weeks to reach metamorphosis.

== Status ==
Woodhouse's toad has a very wide range and presumed large total population. It is able to live in a number of types of habitat and can tolerate some modification to its habitat. The population seems steady and no particular threats have been identified so the International Union for Conservation of Nature has assessed it as being of "least concern". In central Arizona it seems to be displacing or hybridizing with the Arizona toad (Anaxyrus microscaphus).
