= Arnold B. Grobman =

American zoologist

- Born: April 28, 1918; Newark, New Jersey, United States
- Died: July 8, 2012 (aged 94)
- Education: University of Michigan; University of Rochester
- Scientific career
- Fields: Zoology
- Workplaces: Florida State Museum; University of Colorado; American Association of Museums; University of Illinois Chicago; University of Missouri–St. Louis

Arnold B. Grobman (April 28, 1918 – July 8, 2012) was an American zoologist.

== Biography ==
Grobman was born on April 28, 1918, in Newark, New Jersey as Morton Arnold Grobman, later changing his name to Arnold Brams Grobman, taking his mother's maiden name as his middle name. He received his education in the public school system in Newark, New Jersey and began his post-secondary education at the University of Michigan, earning his bachelor's degree in 1939. In 1943, he received a PhD from University of Rochester, then became an instructor in the Department of Zoology, a position that he kept through 1944. From 1944 to 1946, he was a Research Associate on the Manhattan Project, later publishing "Our Atomic Heritage" about his experiences.

He moved to Florida in 1946 to teach at the University of Florida in Gainesville, where he stayed until 1959, working as an assistant professor, then becoming associate professor of biology, a position he held from 1950 to 1952. From 1952 to 1959, he was the director of the Florida State Museum. In 1959, he moved to Boulder, Colorado, where he became the director or the Biological Sciences Curriculum Study (BSCS) at the University of Colorado. In 1965, he moved to New Brunswick, New Jersey, taking the position of dean of the College of Arts and Sciences at Rutgers University. From 1967 to 1972, he worked as the dean of Rutgers College, within the university. In 1972, he became Vice-Chancellor of Academic Affairs at the University of Illinois Chicago Circle, then was appointed special assistant to the President from 1974 to 1976. In 1976, he moved to Missouri, where he had been selected as the Chancellor and a Professor of Biology at the University of Missouri–St. Louis. In 1986, he retired from the chancellorship and was named Chancellor Emeritus and Research Professor. In 1988, he left St. Louis and moved to Virgin Gorda in the British Virgin Islands, publishing "Lizards of Virgin Gorda." He later moved to Vero Beach, Florida, then to Oak Hammock in Gainesville, Florida.

His published works focused on herpetology, but he also published on science and education. He held offices in many organizations, including the American Association of Museums, the American Institute of Biological Sciences, and the American Society of Ichthyologists and Herpetologists, of which he was a secretary from 1952 to 1957, and later as a president in 1964.

He was married to Hulda Gross Grobman and had two children, Marc Ross Grobman and Beth Alison Grobman.

On July 8, 2012, he died in Gainesville, Florida at the age of 94.
