= A. flavescens =

A. flavescens may refer to:

- Acacia flavescens, a tree native to eastern Australia
- Acanthoscelides flavescens, a bean weevil
- Acromyrmex flavescens, a leaf-cutter ant
- Adelotopus flavescens, a ground beetle
- Adelpherupa flavescens, a grass moth
- Aedes flavescens, a mosquito that carries heartworm
- Agathis flavescens, a conifer endemic to Peninsular Malaysia
- Agave flavescens, a Mexican plant
- Aglaia flavescens, an Oceanian plant
- Alternanthera flavescens, a flowering plant
- Alyxia flavescens, an Australasian dogbane
- Amaranthus flavescens, an annual plant
- Anoectochilus flavescens, a jewel orchid
- Anoteropsis flavescens, a wolf spider
- Antennaria flavescens, a daisy native to western North America
- Anthenea flavescens, a sea star
- Anthericum flavescens, a flowering plant
- Anthurium flavescens, a flamingo flower
- Antigonon flavescens, an American buckwheat
- Aphnaeus flavescens, an African butterfly
- Apoctena flavescens, a tortrix moth
- Apotomus flavescens, a ground beetle
- Apriona flavescens, a longhorn beetle
- Aquilegia flavescens, a North American wildflower
- Arcyria flavescens, an amoeboid protozoan
- Argostemma flavescens, a flowering plant
- Argulus flavescens, a carp louse
- Argyrodes flavescens, an Asian spider
- Ariteus flavescens, a bat endemic to Jamaica
- Aspergillus flavescens, a saprotrophic mold
- Astragalus flavescens, a plant native to the Northern Hemisphere
- Asura flavescens, an Asian moth
- Atelopus flavescens, a toad endemic to French Guiana
- Austrostipa flavescens, a true grass
