= Aureolus (disambiguation) =

Aureolus (died 268) was a Roman military commander and would-be usurper.

Aureolus may also refer to:

== People and fictional characters ==
=== People ===
- Aureolus of Aragon (died 809), traditionally known as chief of the Franks in the region of Aragón.
- Petrus Aureolus (c. 1280–1322), scholastic philosopher and theologian, known for his activities in Bologna, Toulouse, and Paris, and his Archbishopric of Aix-en-Provence.
- Paracelsus (c. 1493–1541), born Philippus Aureolus Theophrastus Bombastus von Hohenheim, Swiss physician, alchemist, lay theologian, and philosopher of the German Renaissance.

=== Fictional characters ===
- Aureolus Izzard, descendant of the alchemist Paracelsus, character from A Certain Magical Index.

== Bestiary ==
- Acanthoscelides aureolus, a species of leaf beetle in the family Chrysomelidae.
- Golden mojarra (Deckertichthys aureolus), a species of mojarra.
- Icaricia saepiolus aureolus, subspecies of Icaricia saepiolus, a butterfly of the family Lycaenidae.
- Philodromus aureolus (wandering crab spider), a mainly European running crab spider of the family Philodromidae.
- Tellico salamander (Plethodon aureolus), a small woodland salamander.

== Botany ==
- Rubus aureolus, a species of flowering plant belonging to the family Rosaceae.

== See also ==
- Aureola
- Aureola (disambiguation)
- Aureole
