= Acanthoscelides obvelatus =

Scientific classification
- Kingdom: Animalia
- Phylum: Arthropoda
- Class: Insecta
- Order: Coleoptera
- Suborder: Polyphaga
- Infraorder: Cucujiformia
- Family: Chrysomelidae
- Genus: Acanthoscelides
- Species: A. obvelatus

Binomial name
- Acanthoscelides obvelatus (Bridwell)

Species of beetle

Acanthoscelides obvelatus is a species of bean bruchid occurring in Mexico, Central America, and northern South America. It and the bean weevil, Acanthoscelides obtectus, are sibling species and occur sympatrically throughout A. obvelatus' range. Both species are morphologically very similar and as a result, A. obvelatus has been confused with A. obtectus by several authors. The most notable difference between the two species is that A. obtectus is multivoltine and apparently does not diapause, while A. obvelatus is univoltine and has an obligatory imaginal diapause. Due to this fact, unlike A. obtectus, A. obvelatus is not a pest of stored beans. However, both species can be pests of beans in fields. The main morphological differences between the two species are: the color of the pygidium, femur, and apical antennal segment, which are orange in A. obtectus but brown-black in A. obvelatus; as well as the shape of the antennae, which have longer and thinner segments in A. obvelatus. The most reliable character is only found in males and concerns the shape of lateral lobes of the aedeagus, which are smooth and thin in A. obtectus but sclerified and thick in A. obvelatus.

Although both A. obtectus and A. obvelatus can be found on any bean species in the Phaseolus vulgaris group and at various altitudes throughout their range, it appears that A. obvelatus is predominantly found on Phaseolus coccineus at higher elevation while A. obtectus is predominantly found on Phaseolus vulgaris at lower elevations.
