= Acanthoscelides tenuis =

Scientific classification
- Kingdom: Animalia
- Phylum: Arthropoda
- Class: Insecta
- Order: Coleoptera
- Suborder: Polyphaga
- Infraorder: Cucujiformia
- Family: Chrysomelidae
- Genus: Acanthoscelides
- Species: A. tenuis

Binomial name
- Acanthoscelides tenuis Bottimer, 1935

Species of beetle

Acanthoscelides tenuis is a species in the family Chrysomelidae ("leaf beetles"), in the order Coleoptera ("beetles"). It is found in North America.
