= Acanthoscelides floridae =

Scientific classification
- Kingdom: Animalia
- Phylum: Arthropoda
- Clade: Pancrustacea
- Class: Insecta
- Order: Coleoptera
- Suborder: Polyphaga
- Infraorder: Cucujiformia
- Family: Chrysomelidae
- Genus: Acanthoscelides
- Species: A. floridae

Binomial name
- Acanthoscelides floridae (Horn, 1873)

Species of beetle

Acanthoscelides floridae is a species of leaf beetle in the family Chrysomelidae. It is found in the Caribbean region, Central America, and North America.
