= Acanthoscelides margaretae =

Scientific classification
- Kingdom: Animalia
- Phylum: Arthropoda
- Class: Insecta
- Order: Coleoptera
- Suborder: Polyphaga
- Infraorder: Cucujiformia
- Family: Chrysomelidae
- Genus: Acanthoscelides
- Species: A. margaretae

Binomial name
- Acanthoscelides margaretae Johnson, 1970

Species of beetle

Acanthoscelides margaretae, the a. margaretae or near, is a species of leaf beetle in the family Chrysomelidae. It is found in North America.
