= Acanthoscelides pauperculus =

Scientific classification
- Kingdom: Animalia
- Phylum: Arthropoda
- Clade: Pancrustacea
- Class: Insecta
- Order: Coleoptera
- Suborder: Polyphaga
- Infraorder: Cucujiformia
- Family: Chrysomelidae
- Genus: Acanthoscelides
- Species: A. pauperculus

Binomial name
- Acanthoscelides pauperculus (J. L. LeConte, 1857)

Species of beetle

Acanthoscelides pauperculus is a species of leaf beetle in the family Chrysomelidae. It is found in North America.
