= Acanthoscelides alboscutellatus =

Scientific classification
- Kingdom: Animalia
- Phylum: Arthropoda
- Clade: Pancrustacea
- Class: Insecta
- Order: Coleoptera
- Suborder: Polyphaga
- Infraorder: Cucujiformia
- Family: Chrysomelidae
- Subfamily: Bruchinae
- Tribe: Bruchini
- Genus: Acanthoscelides
- Species: A. alboscutellatus

Binomial name
- Acanthoscelides alboscutellatus (Horn, 1873)

Species of beetle

Acanthoscelides alboscutellatus is a species of leaf beetle in the family Chrysomelidae. It is found in Central America and North America.

Acanthoscelides alboscutellatus hide in fruit over the winter. Adult beetles tend to have a lower survival rate during the end of hibernation if the fruit they are taking cover in does not open due to them not being able to leave it.
