= Myringomycosis =

Fungal infection of the eardrum

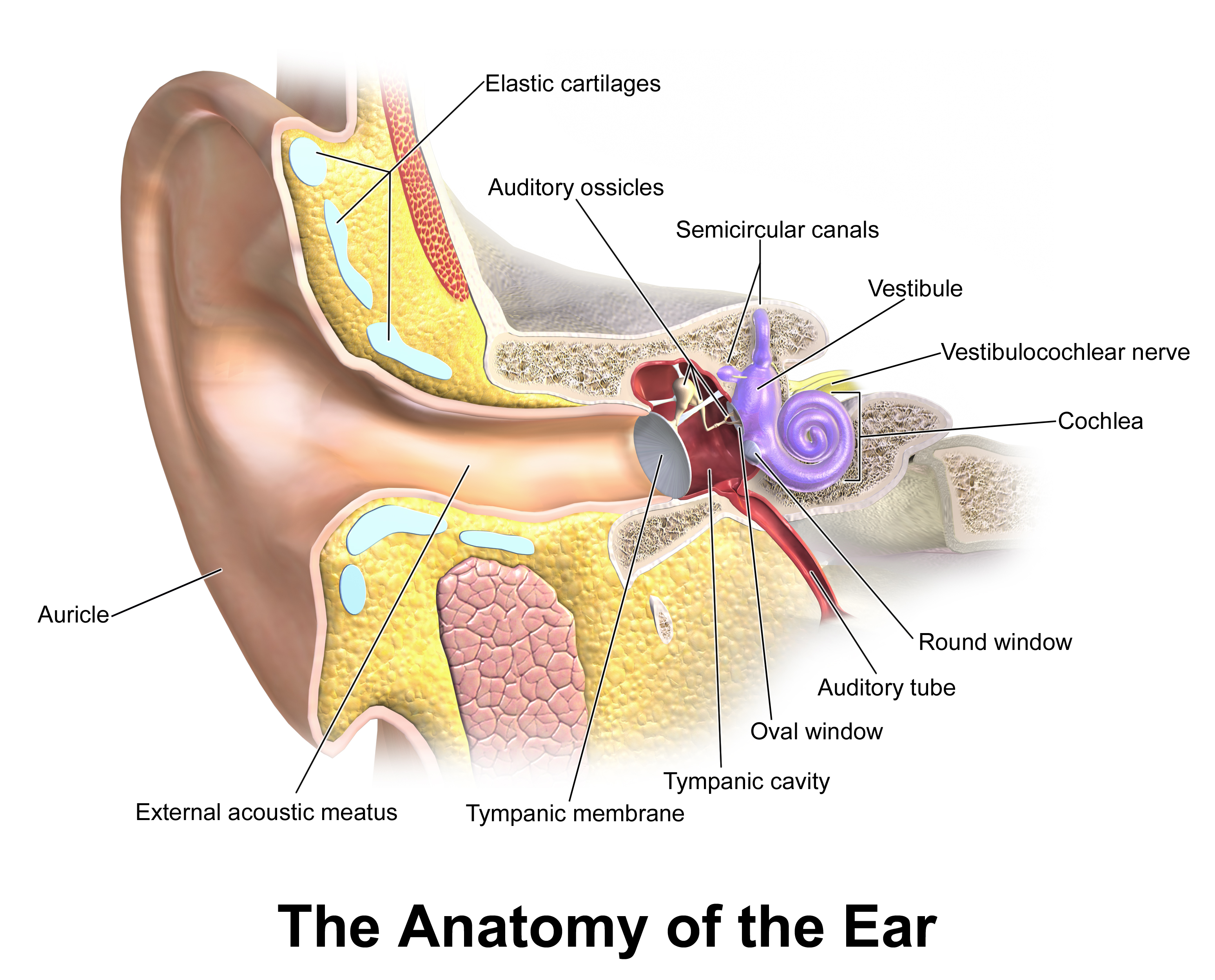

Myringomycosis is a fungal infection of the tympanic membrane. It is caused by the presence of the fungus Aspergillus nigricans or flavescens.
