= Acanthoscelides macrophthalmus =

Scientific classification
- Kingdom: Animalia
- Phylum: Arthropoda
- Clade: Pancrustacea
- Class: Insecta
- Order: Coleoptera
- Suborder: Polyphaga
- Infraorder: Cucujiformia
- Family: Chrysomelidae
- Genus: Acanthoscelides
- Species: A. macrophthalmus

Binomial name
- Acanthoscelides macrophthalmus (Schaeffer, 1907)

Species of beetle

Acanthoscelides macrophthalmus is a species of leaf beetle in the family Chrysomelidae. It is found in Central America, North America, and Oceania.
