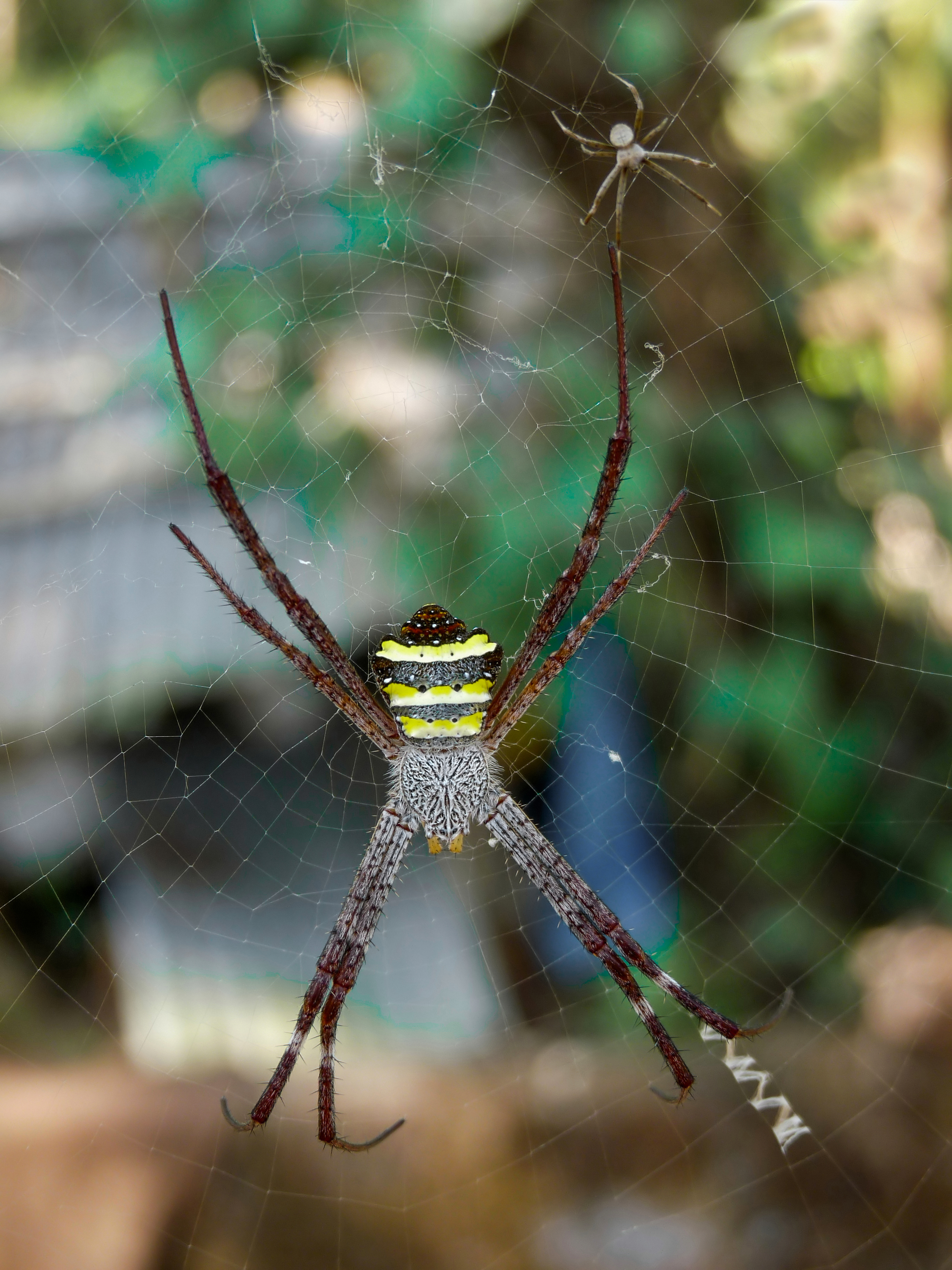
- Female, male at top right

Scientific classification
- Kingdom: Animalia
- Phylum: Arthropoda
- Subphylum: Chelicerata
- Class: Arachnida
- Order: Araneae
- Infraorder: Araneomorphae
- Family: Araneidae
- Genus: Argiope
- Species: A. pulchella

Binomial name
- Argiope pulchella Thorell, 1881

= Argiope pulchella =

Species of arachnid

Argiope pulchella is a species of the orb-weaver spider family, Araneidae. Its range extends from India to China, Indochina, and Sumatra. It is a synanthropic species, often living in habitats associated with humans.

== Description ==
The female is larger than the male, being 8 to 10 mm (0.3 to 0.4 in) while the male is 4 to 6 mm (0.16 to 0.24 in). The female cephalothorax is slightly longer than it is wide and is clad in a white, silky pubescence. The two central eyes are surrounded by black rings and are situated on a prominent tubercle. The chelicerae are brown and rather small. The legs are long and robust, clad with spines and hairs and banded in brown and yellow. The abdomen is pentagonal, overlaps the cephalothorax a little and is slightly longer than it is wide. The dorsal surface is pubescent and is bright yellow in color with three horizontal black bands. The ventral surface is brown with two longitudinal white patches. The male has a more drab appearance, having a dark brown cephalothorax and lacking the stripes found in the female.

== Ecology ==
The female spins an orb-shaped web out of silk. The male does not spin a web, instead it occupies the periphery of the female's web. This species is found naturally in forests, woodland glades and gardens. Other than these natural habitats, it is found abundantly in disturbed habitats like rubbish dumps, drains and sewage works. Juveniles tend to stay in a wider variety of habitats, where sub-adults and adults live primarily in garden areas and roadside drains and domestic sewage. It is an entomophagous predator that preys on a wide range of insects. The female builds a web with a zig-zag stabilimentum and positions itself head-down in the centre. If disturbed, it drops to the ground, returning to its original position when the disturbance passes. A male wishing to mate with the female employs certain courtship behaviours including vibrating its web. It has been shown that the female is more receptive to a male that "shudders" the web at high frequencies for long periods; such activities may also make it less likely that the male will be cannibalised after mating.

== Gallery ==
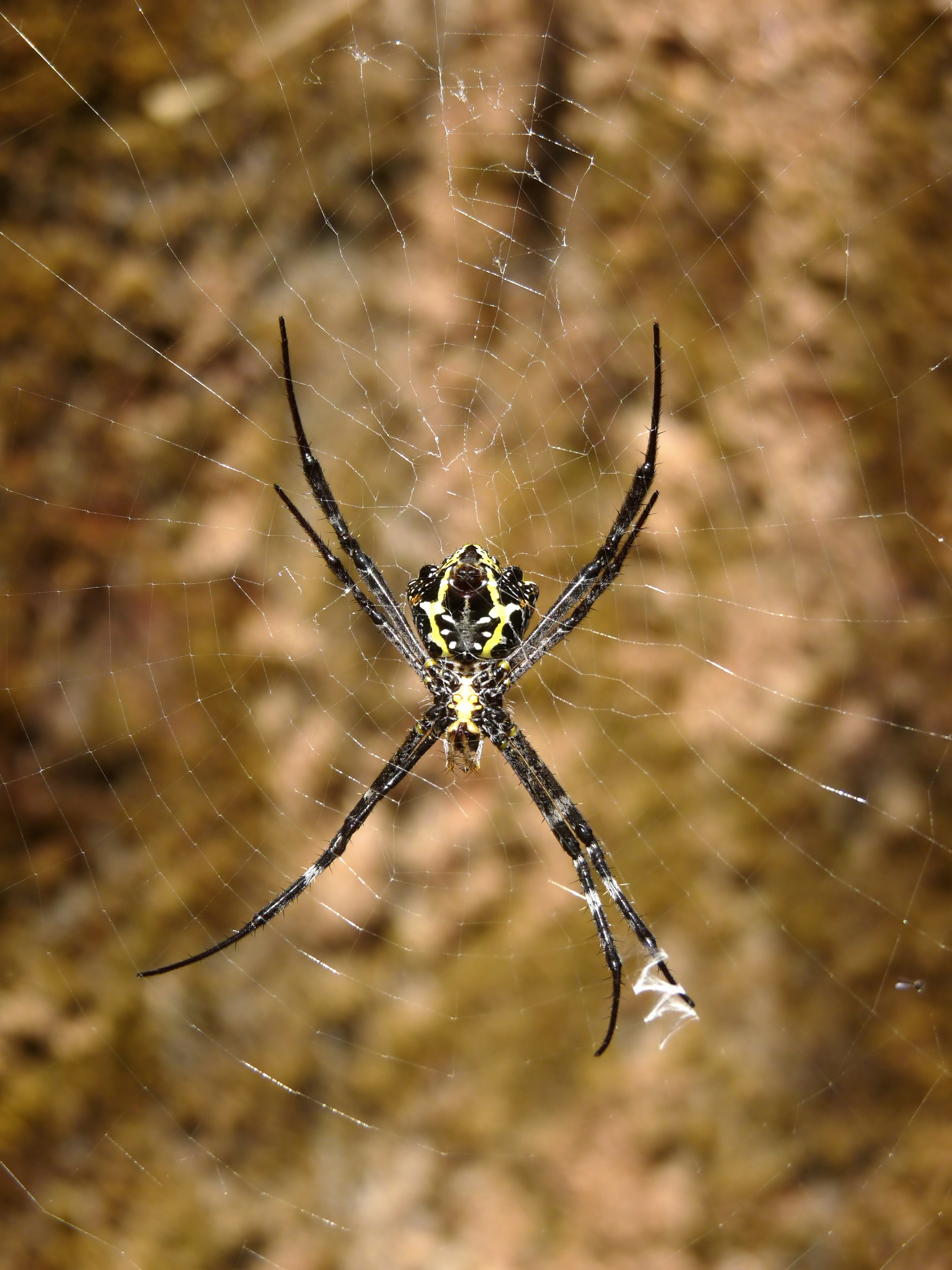
Female; ventral view

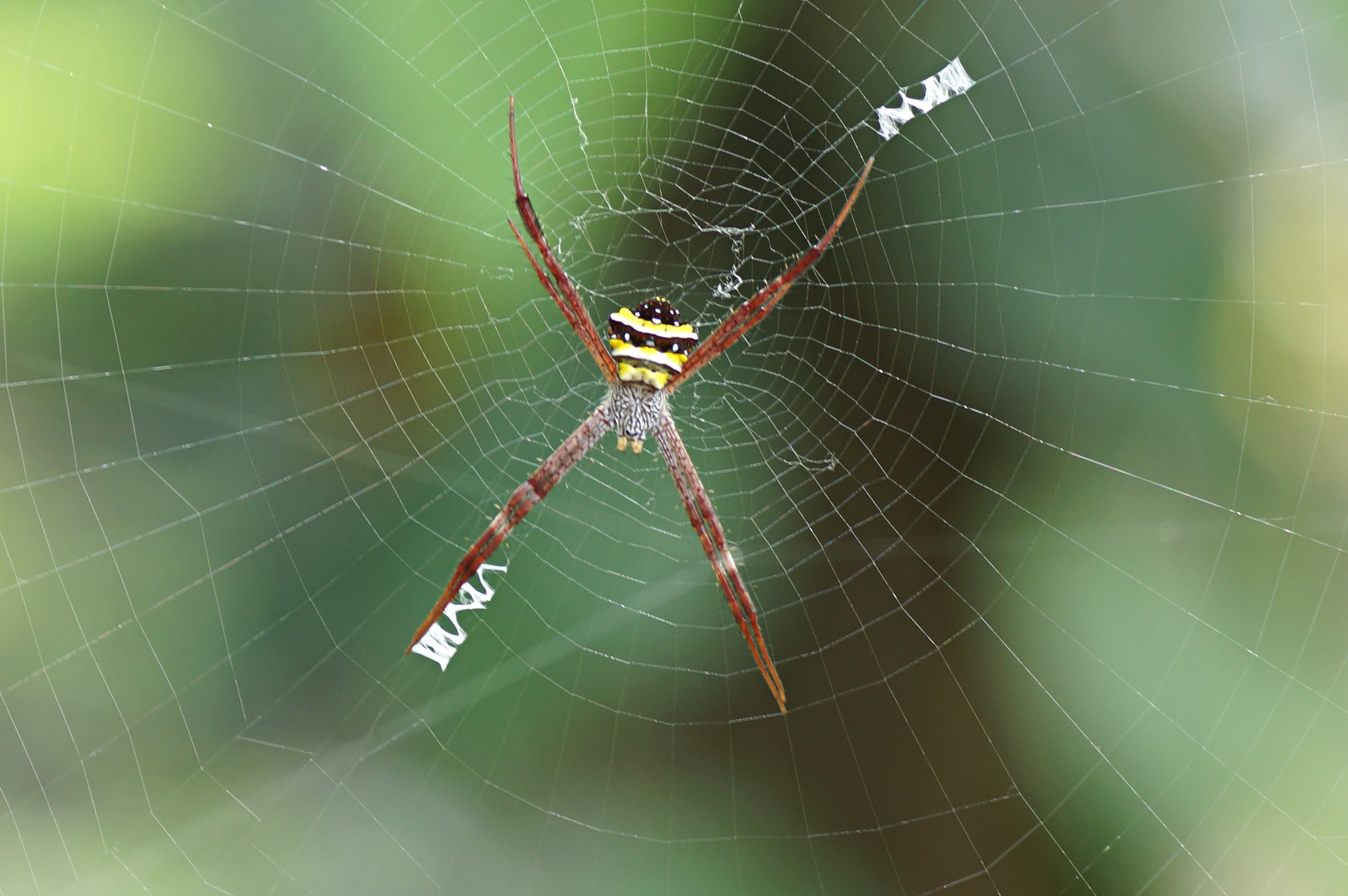
Female; dorsal view with zig-zag stabilimentum

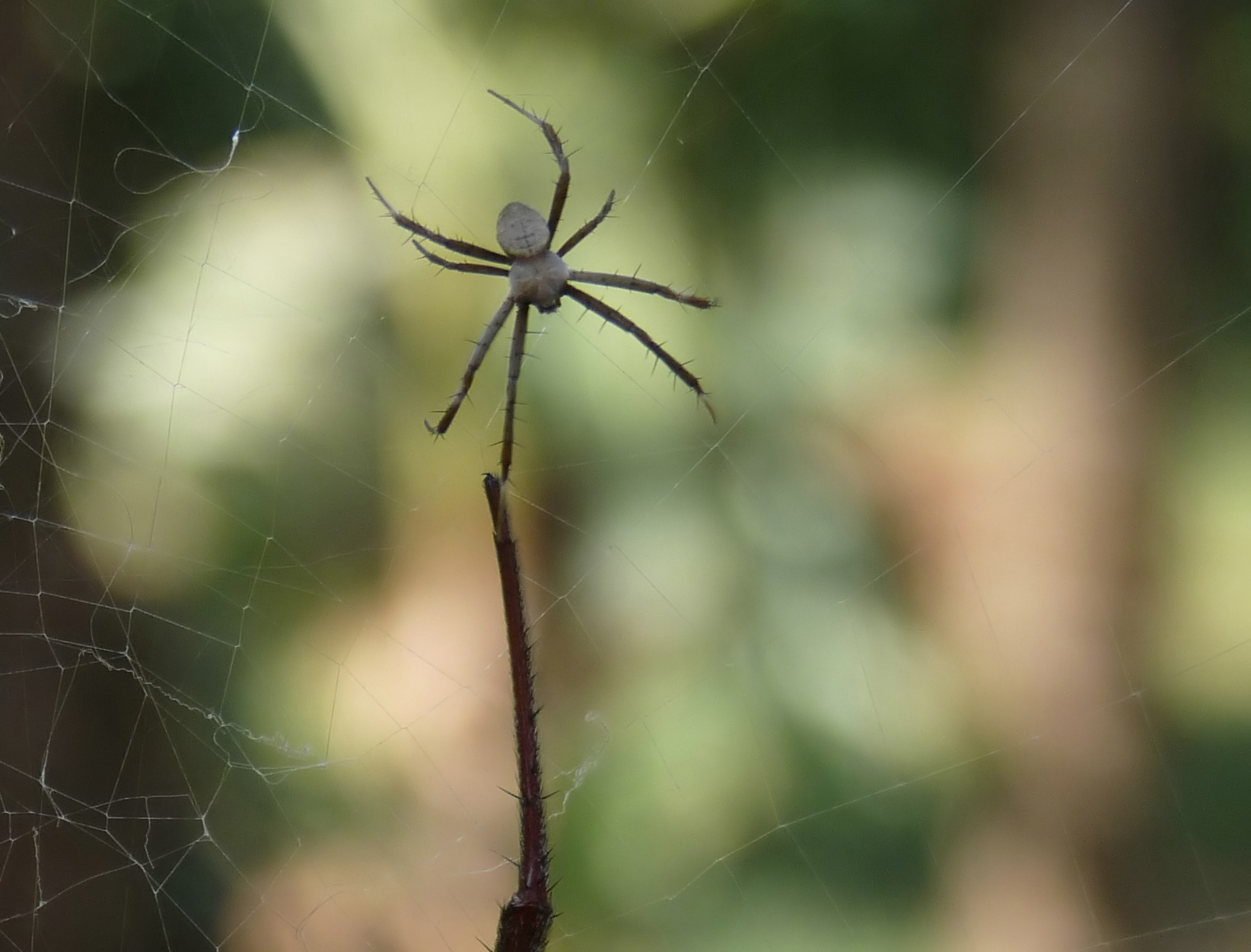
Male, "shuddering" on the leg of female

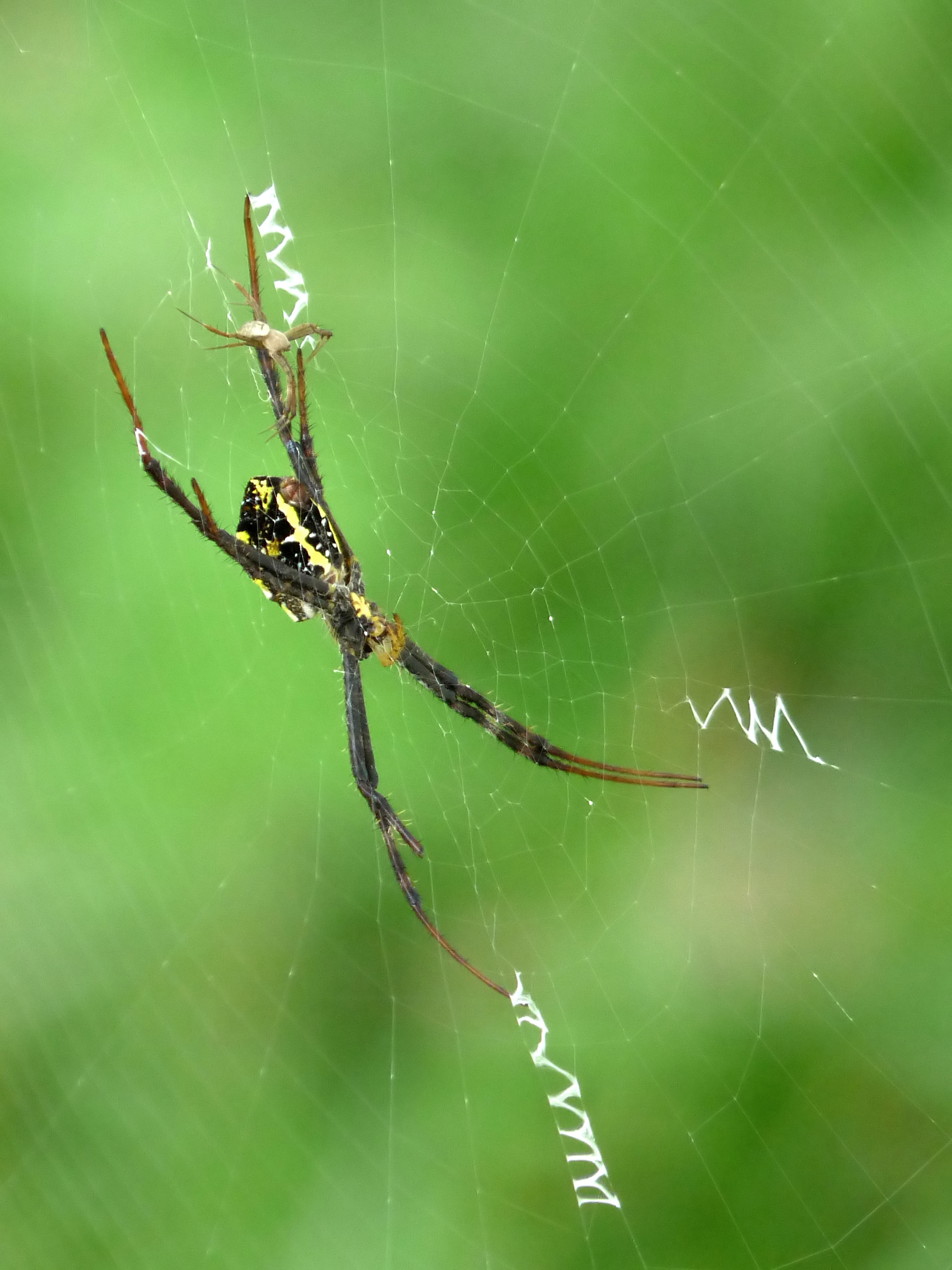
"mating thread dance"

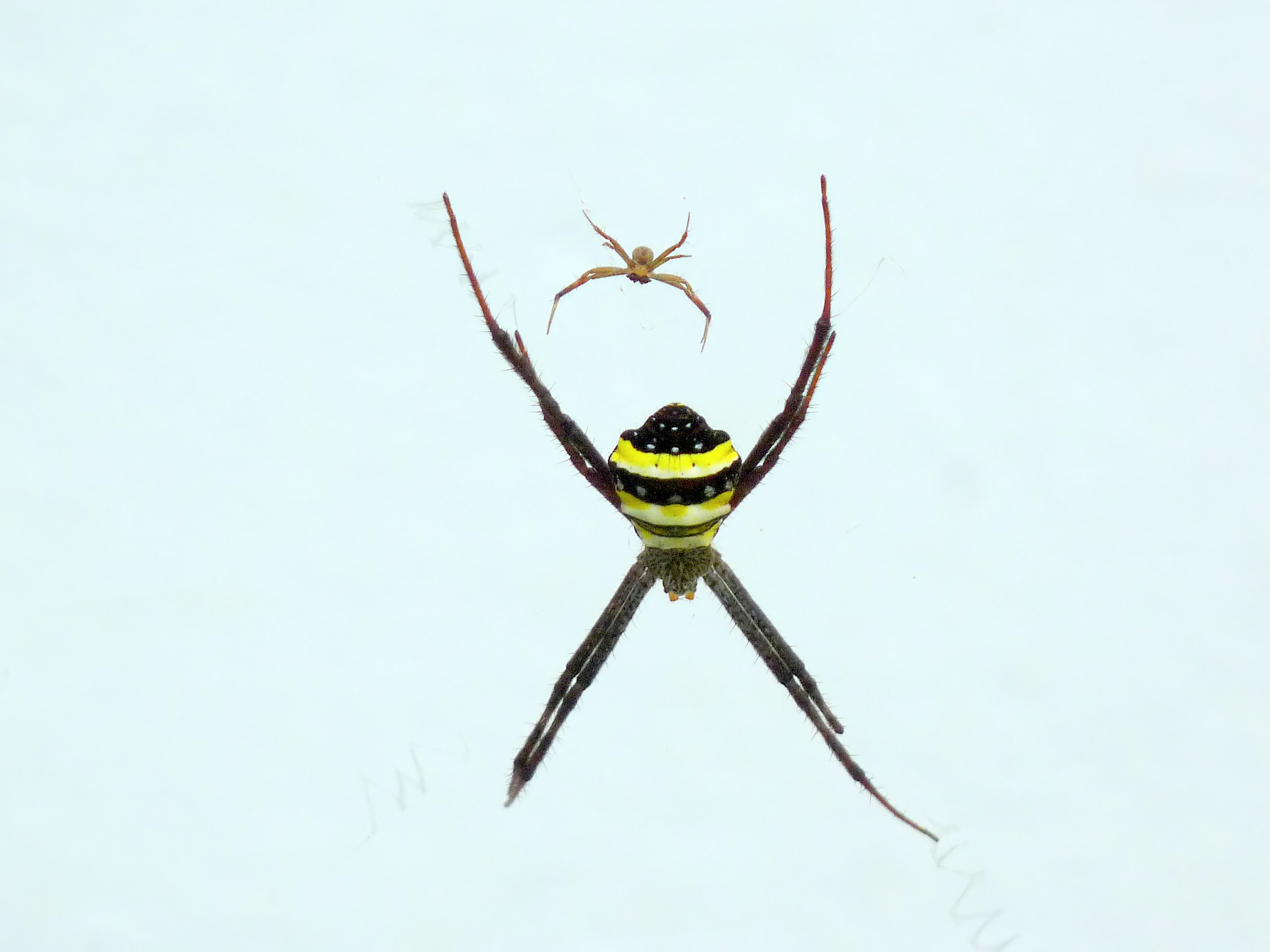
"ready to mate"

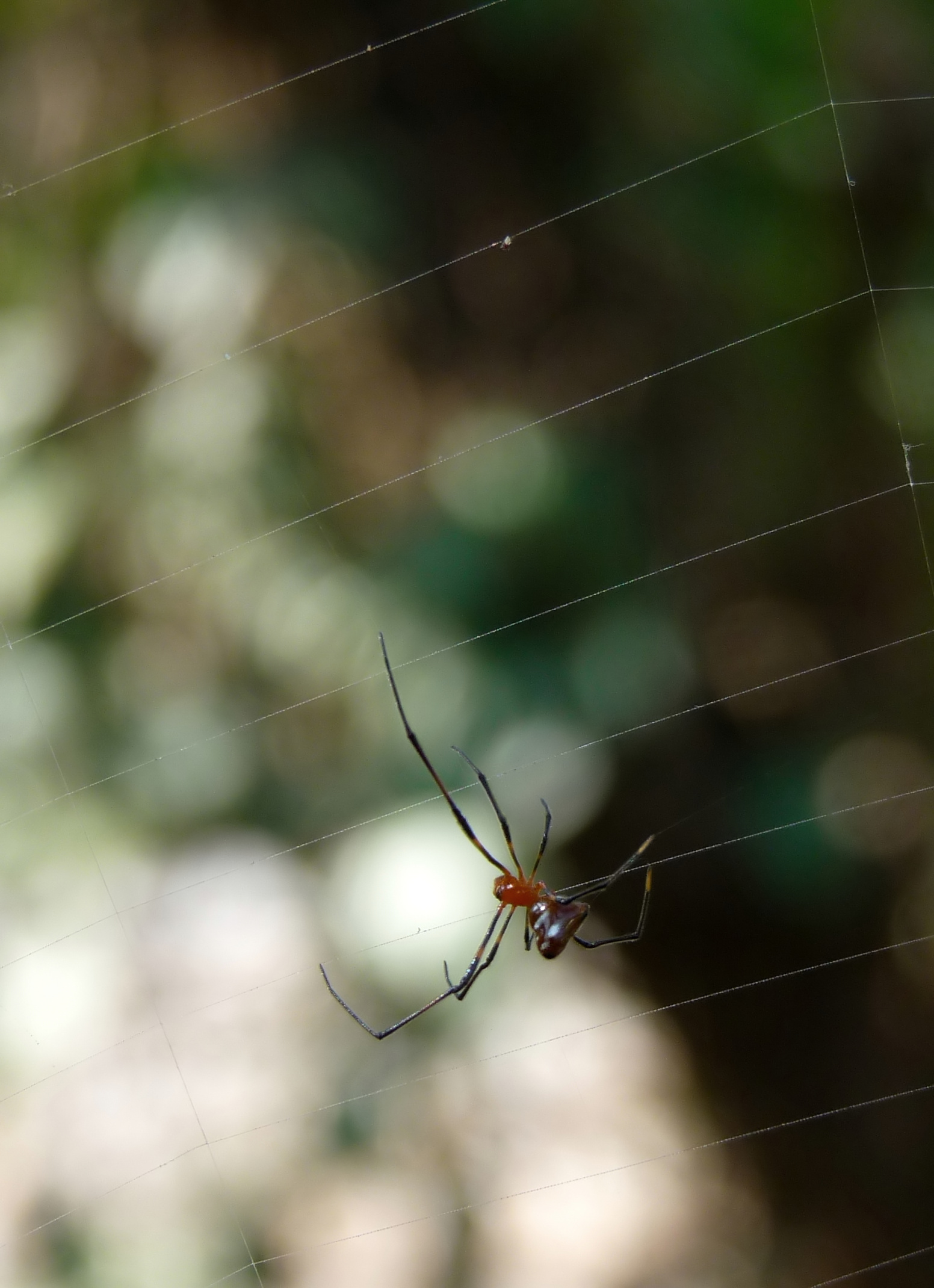
Argyrodes flavescens, a kleptoparasite found on the web of A. pulchella

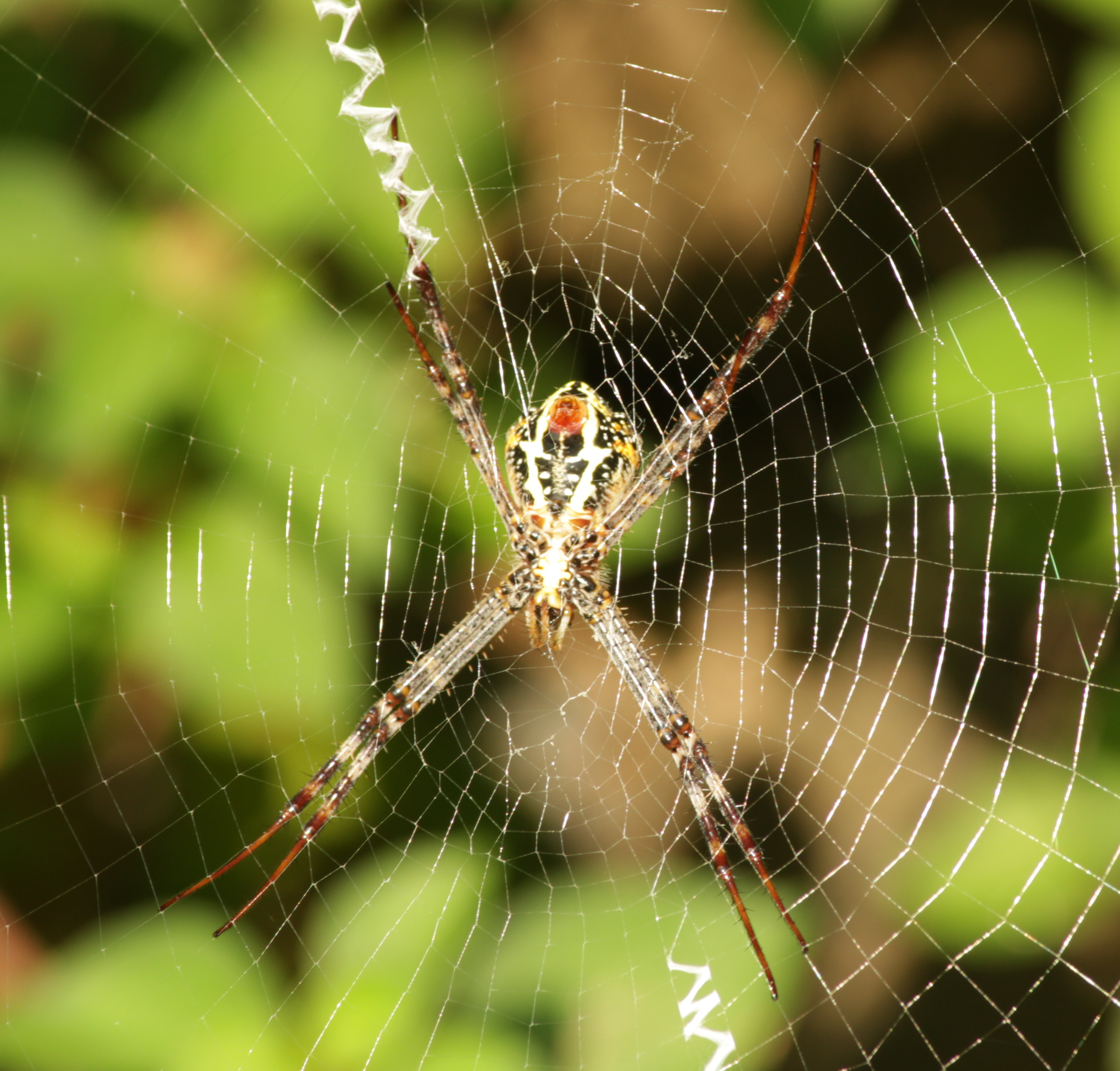
In Kanjirappally, Kerala.

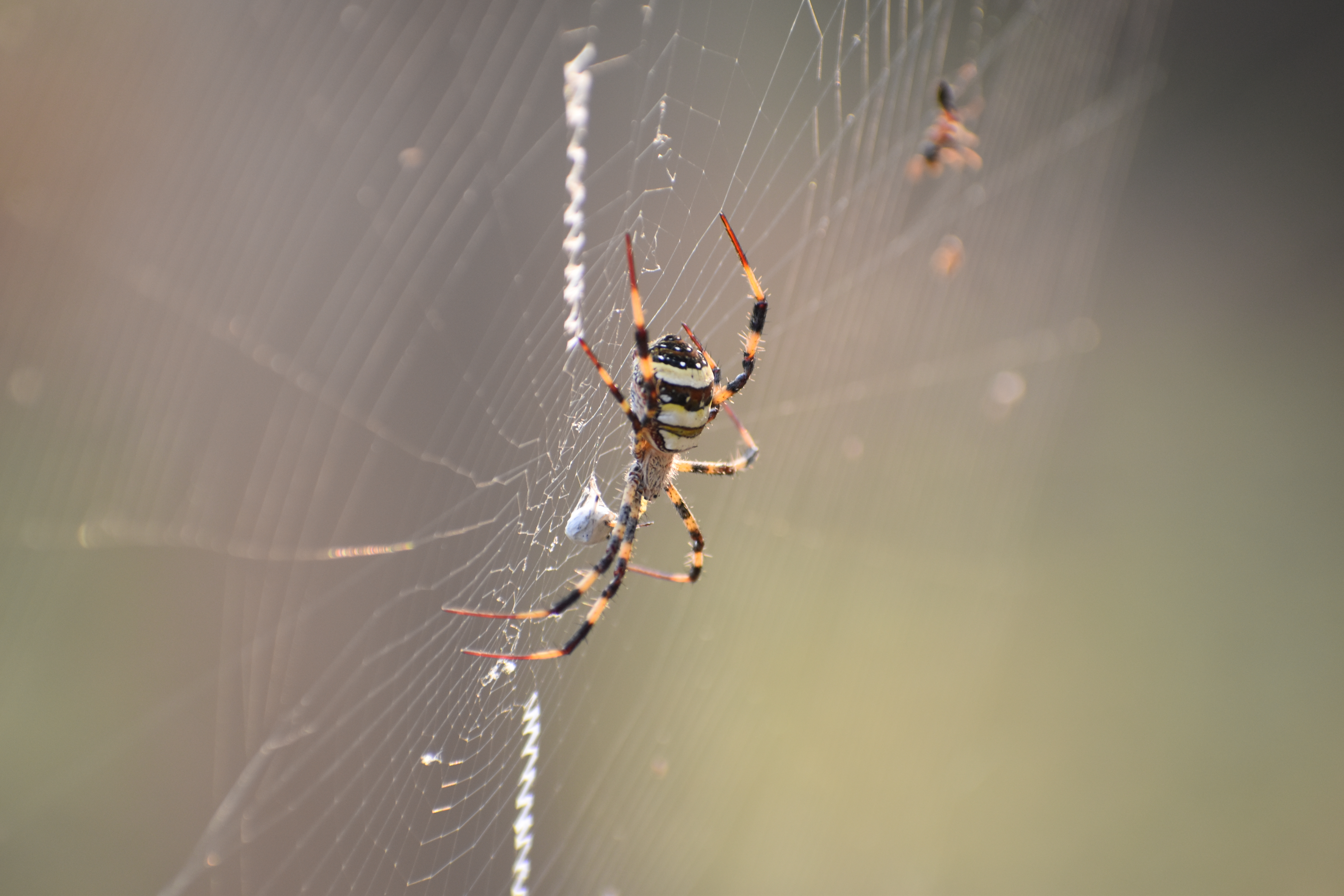
Argiope pulchella spinning silk on a captured ant
