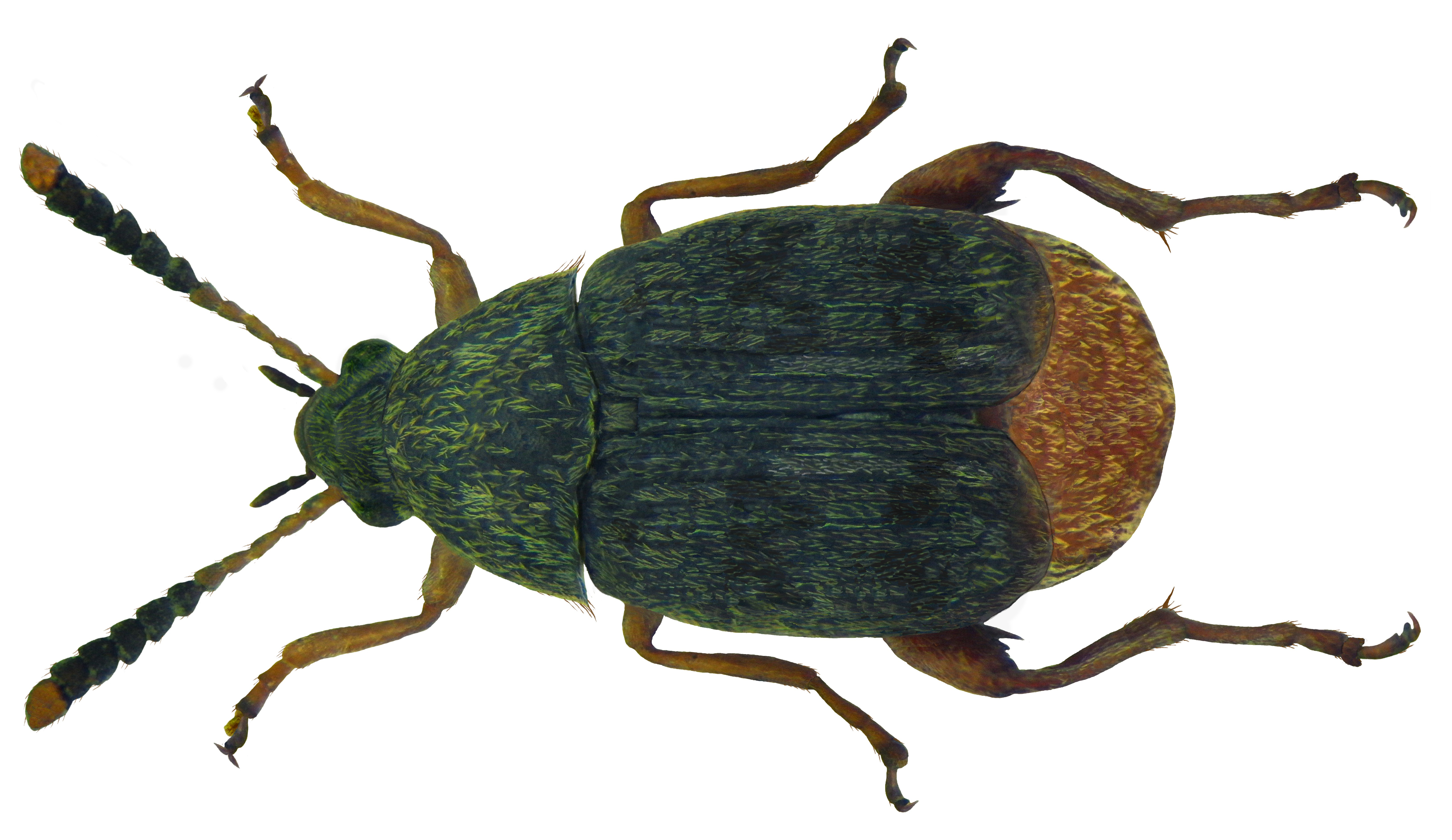
- Acanthoscelides obtectus

Scientific classification
- Kingdom: Animalia
- Phylum: Arthropoda
- Class: Insecta
- Order: Coleoptera
- Suborder: Polyphaga
- Infraorder: Cucujiformia
- Family: Chrysomelidae
- Subfamily: Bruchinae
- Tribe: Bruchini
- Genus: Acanthoscelides; Schilsky, 1905

Species
- 300+, see text

= Acanthoscelides =

Genus of beetles

Acanthoscelides is a genus of bean weevils of the subfamily Bruchinae. They are native to the New World. About one third of them can be found in Mexico.

In 1946 this genus was populated with at least 322 species transferred from other genera, mainly Bruchus. Some of these were later placed into other genera. Estimates of the current number of named species range from about 300 to 340, and there are over 200 undescribed species.

These beetles are generally 1.1 to 3.5 millimeters long. They have large, protruding eyes, and males often have larger eyes than females. They sometimes also have longer antennae. The elytra are about twice as long as they are wide. The beetles of this genus are diverse and the characters used to classify them are not well defined; historically, Acanthoscelides is a wastebasket taxon, "used as a genus into which species are placed that do not fit within the limits of other genera".

Most of these beetles feed on legumes. The majority specialize on Faboideae, many on Mimosoideae, and fewer on Caesalpinioideae. Some are known from non-legume host plants, such as mallows.

Familiar species include Acanthoscelides obtectus, a worldwide pest of beans, and Acanthoscelides macrophthalmus, which is employed as an agent of biological pest control against the invasive tree Leucaena leucocephala.

== Species ==
Species include:

- Acanthoscelides aequalis
- Acanthoscelides alboscutellatus (Horn, 1873)
- Acanthoscelides atomus
- Acanthoscelides aureolus (Horn, 1873)
- Acanthoscelides baboquivari
- Acanthoscelides bisignatus
- Acanthoscelides biustulus (Fall, 1910)
- Acanthoscelides calvus (Horn, 1873)
- Acanthoscelides chiricahuae (Fall, 1910)
- Acanthoscelides compressicornis (Schaeffer, 1907)
- Acanthoscelides comstocki
- Acanthoscelides daleae
- Acanthoscelides desmanthi
- Acanthoscelides distinguendus
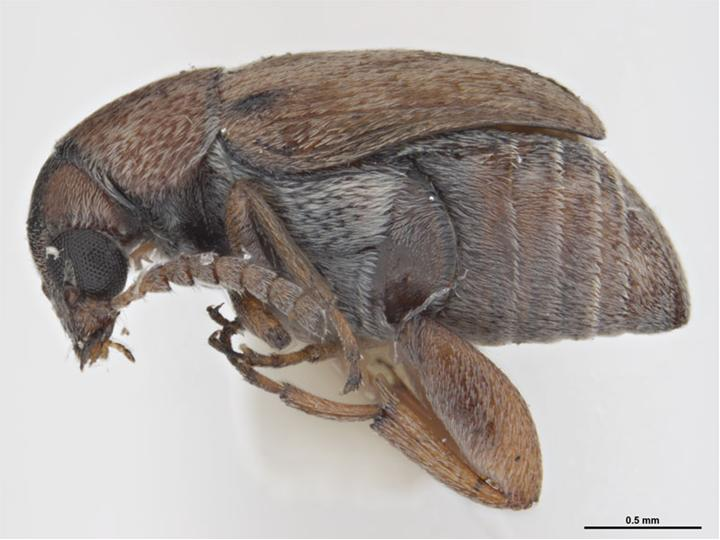
  Acanthoscelides longescutus
- Acanthoscelides flavescens
- Acanthoscelides floridae
- Acanthoscelides fraterculus
- Acanthoscelides fumatus
- Acanthoscelides griseolus
- Acanthoscelides helianthemum
- Acanthoscelides herissantitus
- Acanthoscelides inquisitus
- Acanthoscelides kingsolveri
- Acanthoscelides lobatus
- Acanthoscelides longistilus
- Acanthoscelides macrophthalmus
- Acanthoscelides margaretae
- Acanthoscelides mixtus
- Acanthoscelides modestus
- Acanthoscelides mundulus
- Acanthoscelides napensis
- Acanthoscelides oblongoguttatus
- Acanthoscelides obrienorum
- Acanthoscelides obsoletus
- Acanthoscelides obtectus
- Acanthoscelides obvelatus
- Acanthoscelides oregonensis
- Acanthoscelides pallidipennis
- Acanthoscelides pauperculus
- Acanthoscelides pectoralis
- Acanthoscelides pedicularius
- Acanthoscelides perforatus
- Acanthoscelides prosopoides
- Acanthoscelides pullus
- Acanthoscelides pusillimus
- Acanthoscelides quadridentatus
- Acanthoscelides rufovittatus
- Acanthoscelides sauli
- Acanthoscelides schaefferi
- Acanthoscelides schrankiae
- Acanthoscelides seminulum
- Acanthoscelides sousai
- Acanthoscelides speciosus
- Acanthoscelides stylifer
- Acanthoscelides subaequalis
- Acanthoscelides submuticus
- Acanthoscelides tenuis
- Acanthoscelides tridenticulatus
