= Acanthoscelides pallidipennis =

Scientific classification
- Kingdom: Animalia
- Phylum: Arthropoda
- Class: Insecta
- Order: Coleoptera
- Suborder: Polyphaga
- Infraorder: Cucujiformia
- Family: Chrysomelidae
- Genus: Acanthoscelides
- Species: A. pallidipennis

Binomial name
- Acanthoscelides pallidipennis (Motschulsky, 1874)

Species of beetle

Acanthoscelides pallidipennis is a species of leaf beetle in the family Chrysomelidae.
