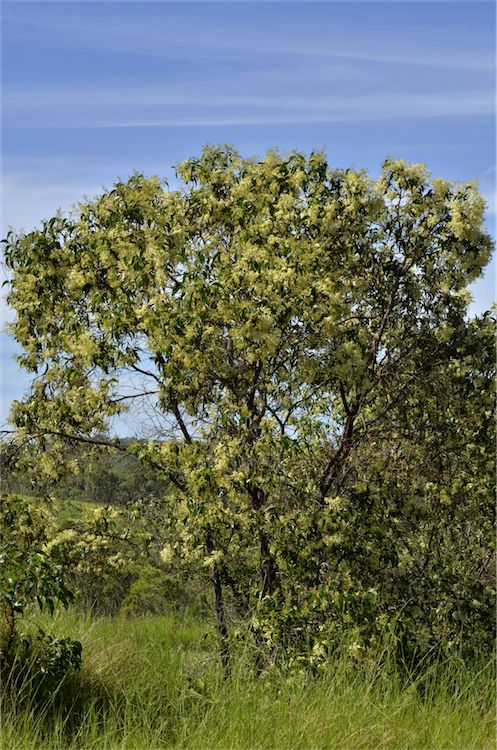

Scientific classification
- Kingdom: Plantae
- Clade: Tracheophytes
- Clade: Angiosperms
- Clade: Eudicots
- Clade: Rosids
- Order: Fabales
- Family: Fabaceae
- Subfamily: Caesalpinioideae
- Clade: Mimosoid clade
- Genus: Acacia
- Species: A. flavescens

Binomial name
- Acacia flavescens A.Cunn. ex Benth.
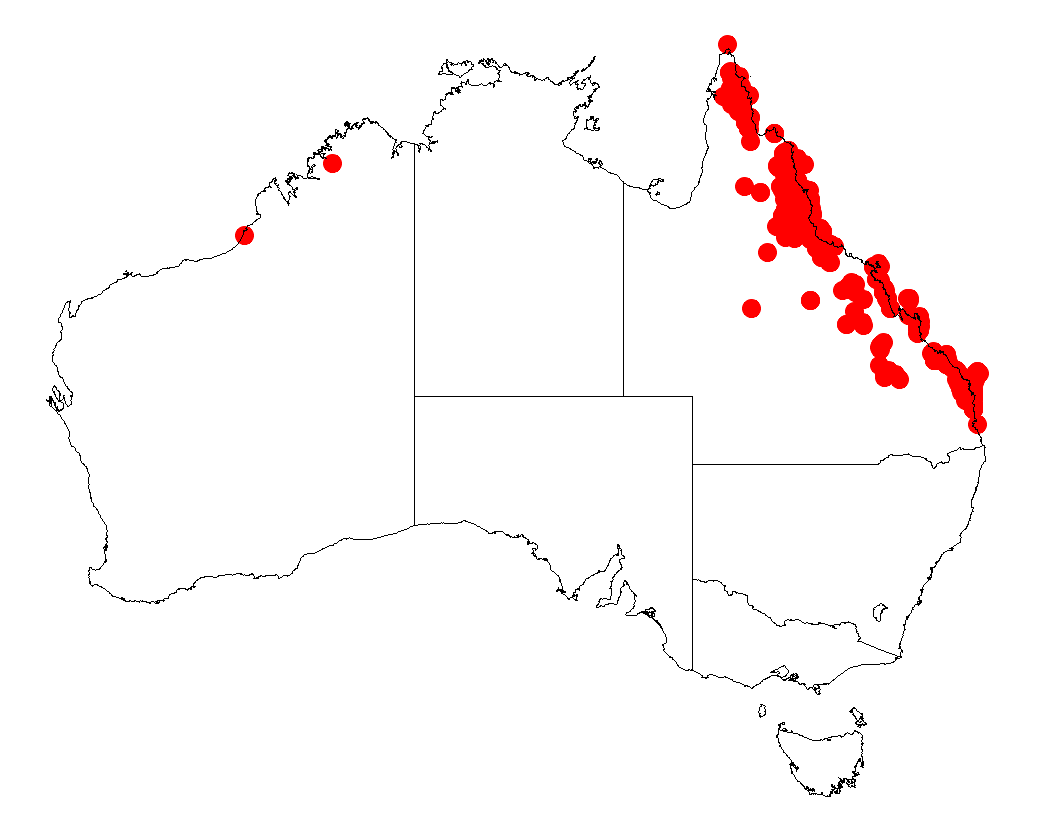
- Occurrence data from AVH

Synonyms
- Acacia flavescens A.Cunn. ex Benth. var. flavescens; Acacia flavescens var. nobilis Domin; Acacia flavescens var. typica Domin nom. inval.; Racosperma flavescens (A.Cunn. ex Benth.) Pedley

= Acacia flavescens =

Yellow wattle, red wattle

Species of legume

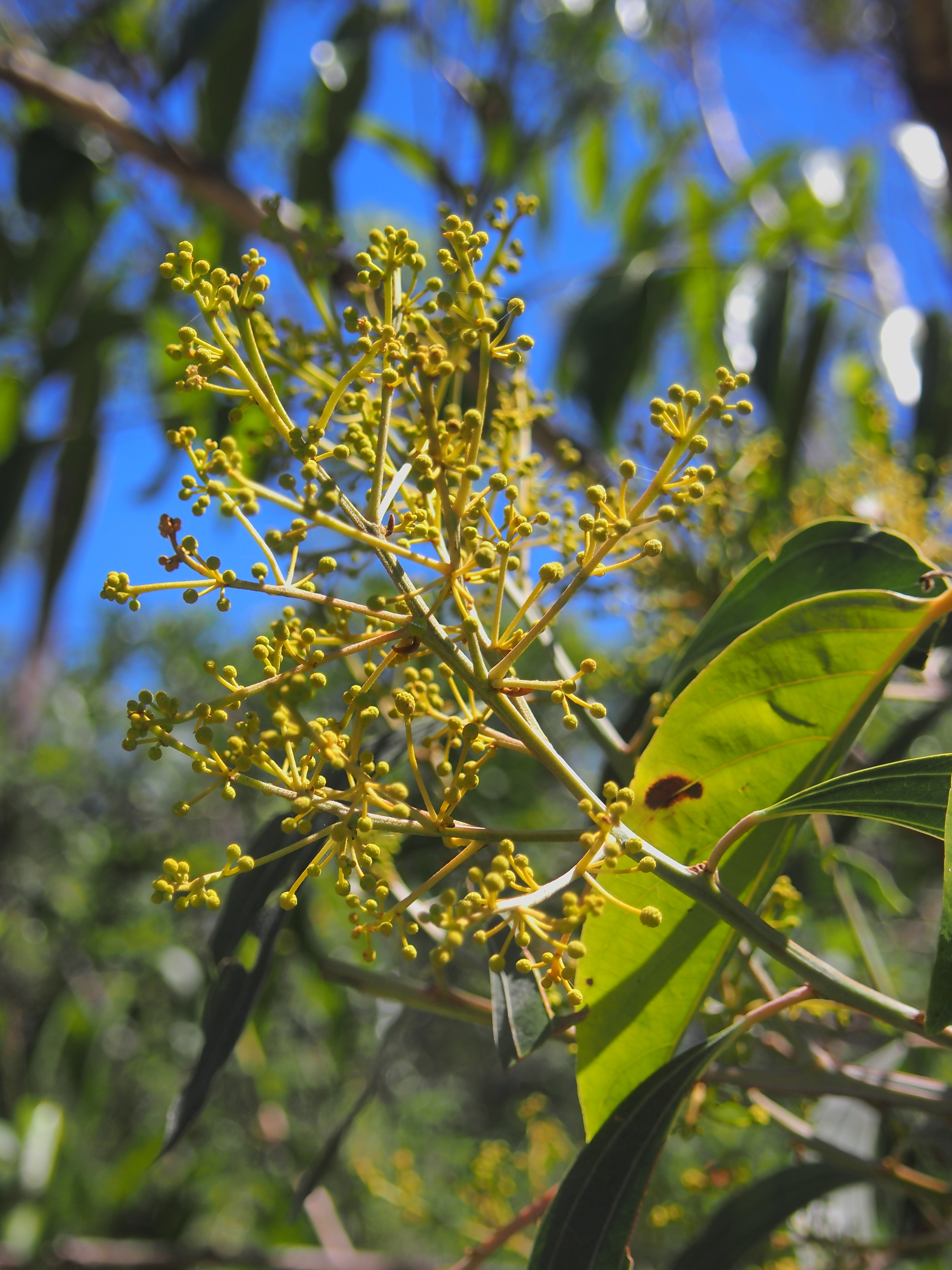
Flower buds

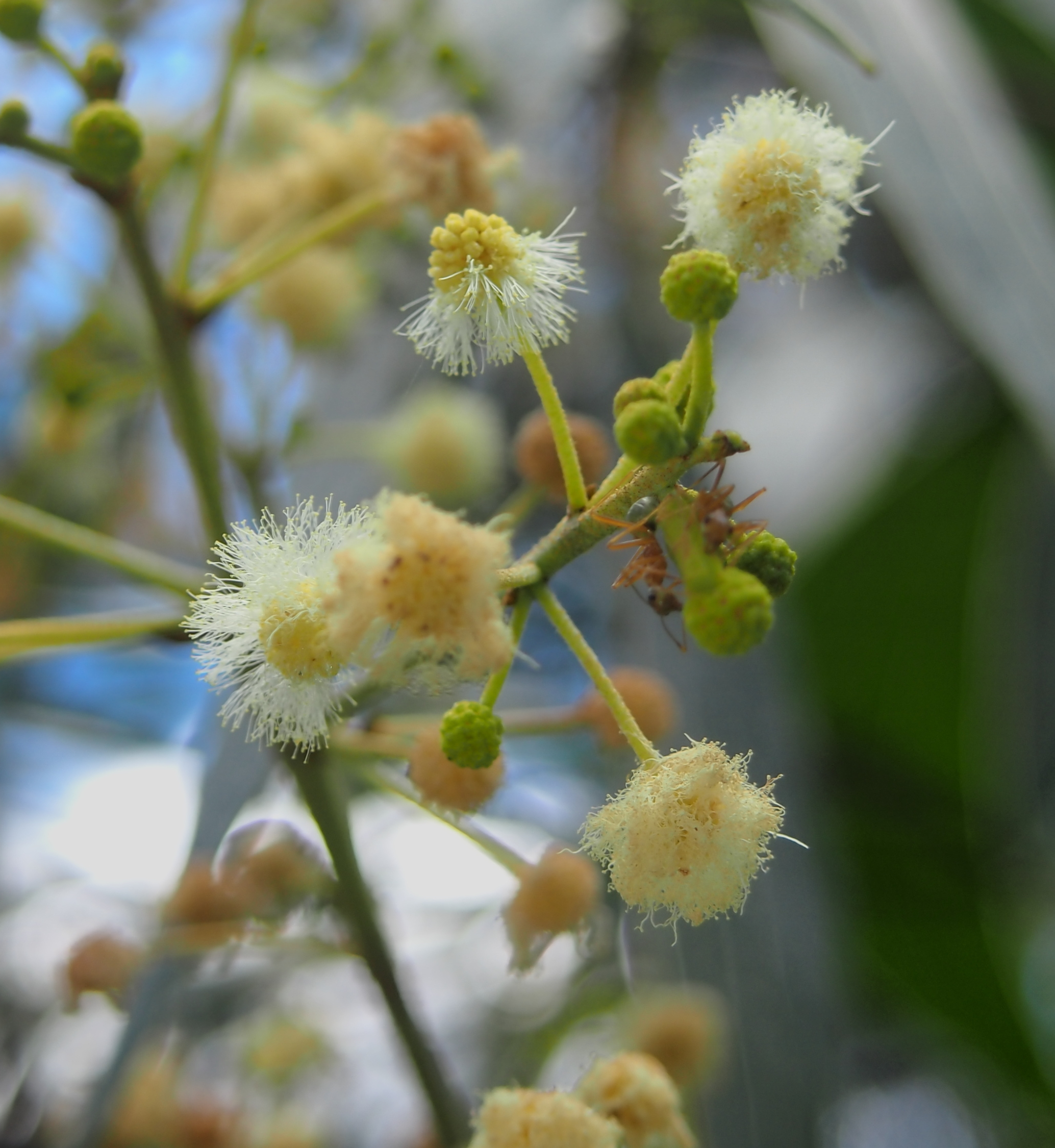
Flowers

Acacia flavescens, also known as red wattle or yellow wattle, is a species of flowering plant in the family Fabaceae and is endemic to Queensland, Australia. It is a tree with rough, furrowed bark, branchlets covered with star-shaped hairs, narrowly elliptic to lance-shaped phyllodes, spherical heads of cream-coloured flowers and flat, thinly leathery pods.

== Description ==
Acacia flavescens is a tree that typically grows to a height of 4–20 m (13–66 ft) and has rough, furrowed, somewhat shaggy bark. Its branchlets are covered with star-shaped hairs, and new shoots have golden hairs. The phyllodes are narrowly elliptic to lance-shaped, 90–300 mm (3.5–11.8 in) long and 20–70 mm (0.79–2.76 in) wide and more or less glabrous with three prominent main veins. The flowers are borne in spherical heads in racemes 20–100 mm (0.79–3.94 in) long in axils or in panicles on the ends of branchlets on peduncles 6–28 mm (0.24–1.10 in) long. Each head is 4.5–6 mm (0.18–0.24 in) in diameter with 30 to 60 cream-coloured flowers. The pods are flat, up to 120 mm (4.7 in) long, 15–25 mm (0.59–0.98 in) wide, thinly leathery and glabrous. The seeds are elliptic, 6–7 mm (0.24–0.28 in) long and dull black with an aril.

== Taxonomy ==
Acacia flavescens was first formally described by George Bentham in Hooker's London Journal of Botany from an unpublished description by Allan Cunningham of specimens he collected on the Percy Islands in north-east Queensland in 1819. The specific epithet (flavescens) means 'pale yellow' or 'yellowish'.

A. flavescens resembles and is closely related to Acacia leptoloba.

== Distribution and habitat ==
This species of wattle is widespread, mainly in near-coastal areas of eastern Queensland from Cape York Peninsula and south to near Brisbane, where it grows in sand in eucalypt forest and woodland, sometimes along the margins of monsoon forest and rainforest, at altitudes ranging from sea level to 1,000 metres (3,281 ft).

== Cultivation and uses ==
The species is sold commercially in seed form. Seeds need to be pre-treated by scarifying or soaking in hot water prior to planting. The tree grows well in a sunny location in a wide range of soils including poor soils. It is fast growing and can shoot from root suckers making it a possible weed problem. It has a symbiotic relationship with nitrogen fixing bacteria found on the root nodules. The wood can be used as a fuel and the plant grown for soil stabilization or erosion control. The bark contains 10 to 26% tannin. The bark is an astringent and can be used externally to treat wounds or internally to treat diarrhoea and dysentery.
