= Acanthoscelides longistilus =

Scientific classification
- Kingdom: Animalia
- Phylum: Arthropoda
- Class: Insecta
- Order: Coleoptera
- Suborder: Polyphaga
- Infraorder: Cucujiformia
- Family: Chrysomelidae
- Genus: Acanthoscelides
- Species: A. longistilus

Binomial name
- Acanthoscelides longistilus (Horn, 1873)

Species of beetle

Acanthoscelides longistilus is a species of leaf beetle in the family Chrysomelidae. It is found in North America.
