= Aspergillus flavescens =

Scientific classification
- Kingdom: Fungi
- Division: Ascomycota
- Class: Eurotiomycetes
- Order: Eurotiales
- Family: Aspergillaceae
- Genus: Aspergillus
- Species: A. flavescens

Binomial name
- Aspergillus flavescens Wreden, R. 1867

Species of fungus

Aspergillus flavescens is a rare species of fungus in the genus Aspergillus. Aspergillus flavescens can cause Myringomycosis.
