= Asura uniformeola =

Scientific classification
- Kingdom: Animalia
- Phylum: Arthropoda
- Class: Insecta
- Order: Lepidoptera
- Superfamily: Noctuoidea
- Family: Erebidae
- Subfamily: Arctiinae
- Genus: Asura
- Species: A. uniformeola

Binomial name
- Asura uniformeola Hampson, 1900

Synonyms
- Tigrioides flavescens Rothschild, 1912

Species of moth

Asura uniformeola is a moth of the family Erebidae. It was described by George Hampson in 1910. It is found on Borneo and Taiwan.
