= Acanthoscelides flavescens =

Scientific classification
- Kingdom: Animalia
- Phylum: Arthropoda
- Clade: Pancrustacea
- Class: Insecta
- Order: Coleoptera
- Suborder: Polyphaga
- Infraorder: Cucujiformia
- Family: Chrysomelidae
- Genus: Acanthoscelides
- Species: A. flavescens

Binomial name
- Acanthoscelides flavescens (Fahraeus, 1839)

Species of beetle

Acanthoscelides flavescens is a species of leaf beetle in the family Chrysomelidae. It is found in the Caribbean region, Central America, North America, and South America.
