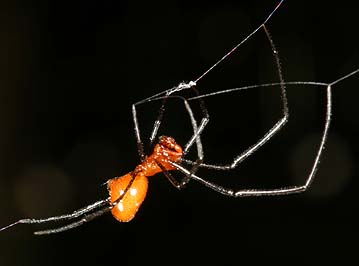
- Male

Scientific classification
- Domain: Eukaryota
- Kingdom: Animalia
- Phylum: Arthropoda
- Subphylum: Chelicerata
- Class: Arachnida
- Order: Araneae
- Infraorder: Araneomorphae
- Family: Theridiidae
- Genus: Argyrodes
- Species: A. flavescens

Binomial name
- Argyrodes flavescens O. P.-Cambridge, 1880

= Argyrodes flavescens =

Species of spider

Argyrodes flavescens, commonly called the red and silver dewdrop spider is a species of spider belonging to the family Theridiidae. It is widely distributed in Southeast Asia and is also found in Sri Lanka. Like other members of this genus, this species is a kleptoparasite, living on the web of a larger spider and feeding off its prey. A. flavescens most commonly inhabits the webs of araneids.

This is a very small spider with a length (excluding legs) of around 3 mm. The legs are black and the markedly domed and very shiny abdomen is red-brown with white spots.

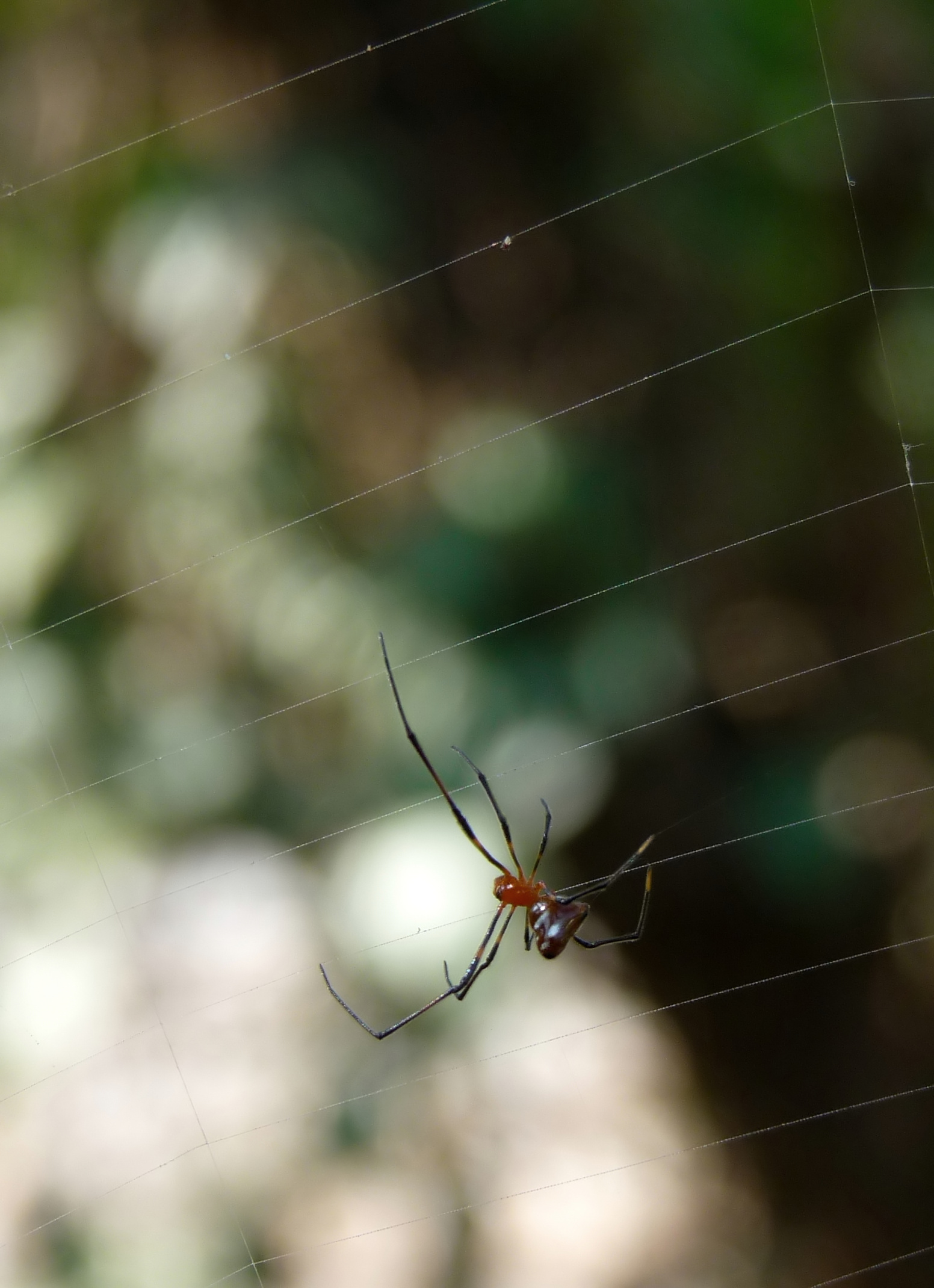
Argyrodes flavescens on the web of an Argiope pulchella
