= Rubus aureolus =

Scientific classification
- Kingdom: Plantae
- Clade: Tracheophytes
- Clade: Angiosperms
- Clade: Eudicots
- Clade: Rosids
- Order: Rosales
- Family: Rosaceae
- Genus: Rubus
- Species: R. aureolus

Binomial name
- Rubus aureolus Allander

Species of flowering plant

Rubus aureolus is a species of flowering plant belonging to the family Rosaceae.

It is native to Sweden and Finland.
