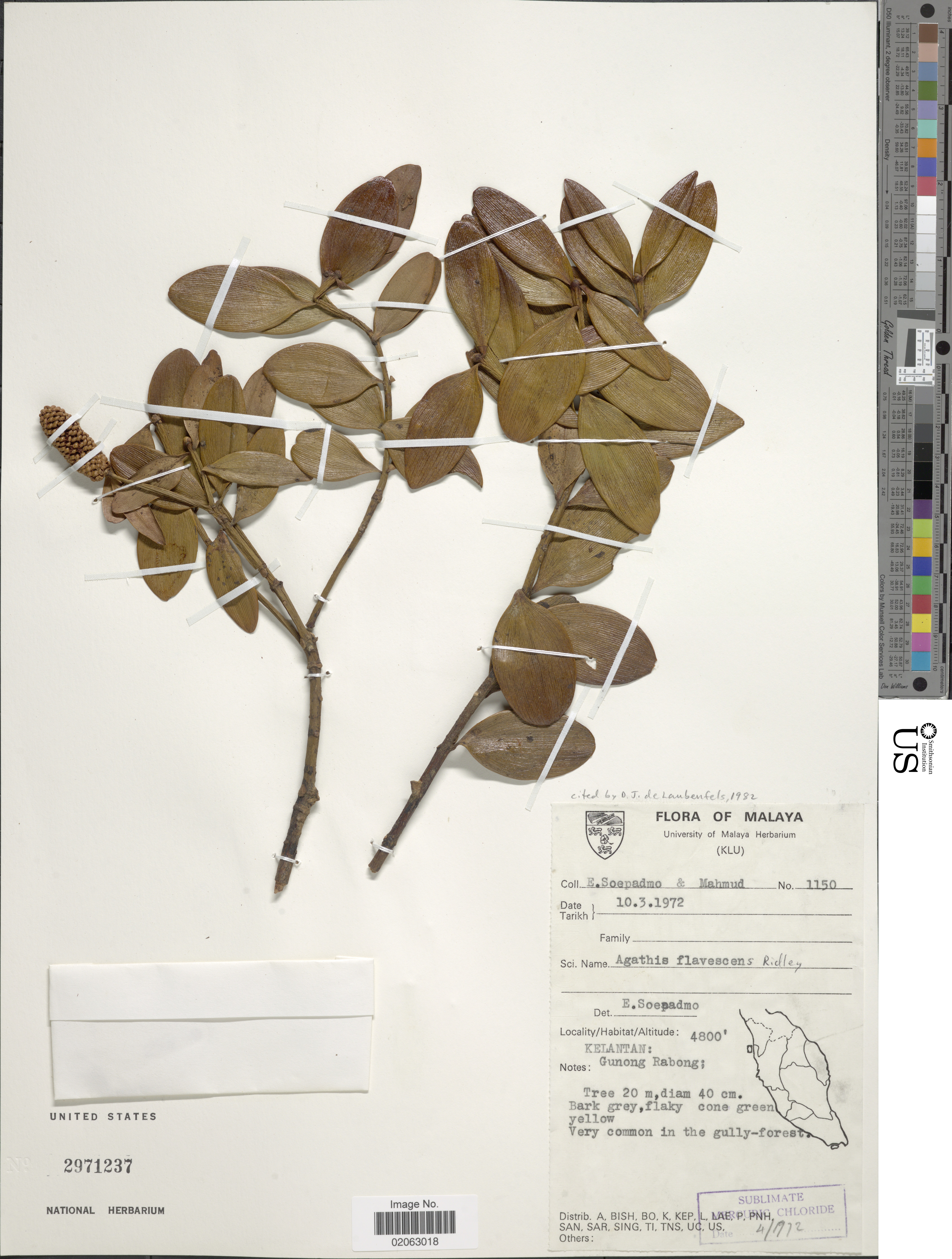

Conservation status
- Vulnerable (IUCN 3.1)

Scientific classification
- Kingdom: Plantae
- Clade: Embryophytes
- Clade: Tracheophytes
- Clade: Gymnosperms
- Division: Pinophyta
- Class: Pinopsida
- Order: Araucariales
- Family: Araucariaceae
- Genus: Agathis
- Species: A. flavescens

Binomial name
- Agathis flavescens Ridl.

Synonyms
- Agathis celebica subsp. flavescens (Ridl.) Veldkamp & Whitmore; Agathis dammara subsp. flavescens (Ridl.) Whitmore

= Agathis flavescens =

Species of conifer

Agathis flavescens is a species of conifer in the family Araucariaceae. It is sometimes considered a variety of Agathis dammara.

Agathis flavescens is found only in remote parts of the Peninsular Malaysia. Less than 1,000 mature individuals are likely to exist in three separate populations. An area where specimens frequently display yellowing leaves is suggestive of poor nutrient conditions.

The species was described by Henry Nicholas Ridley in 1914.
