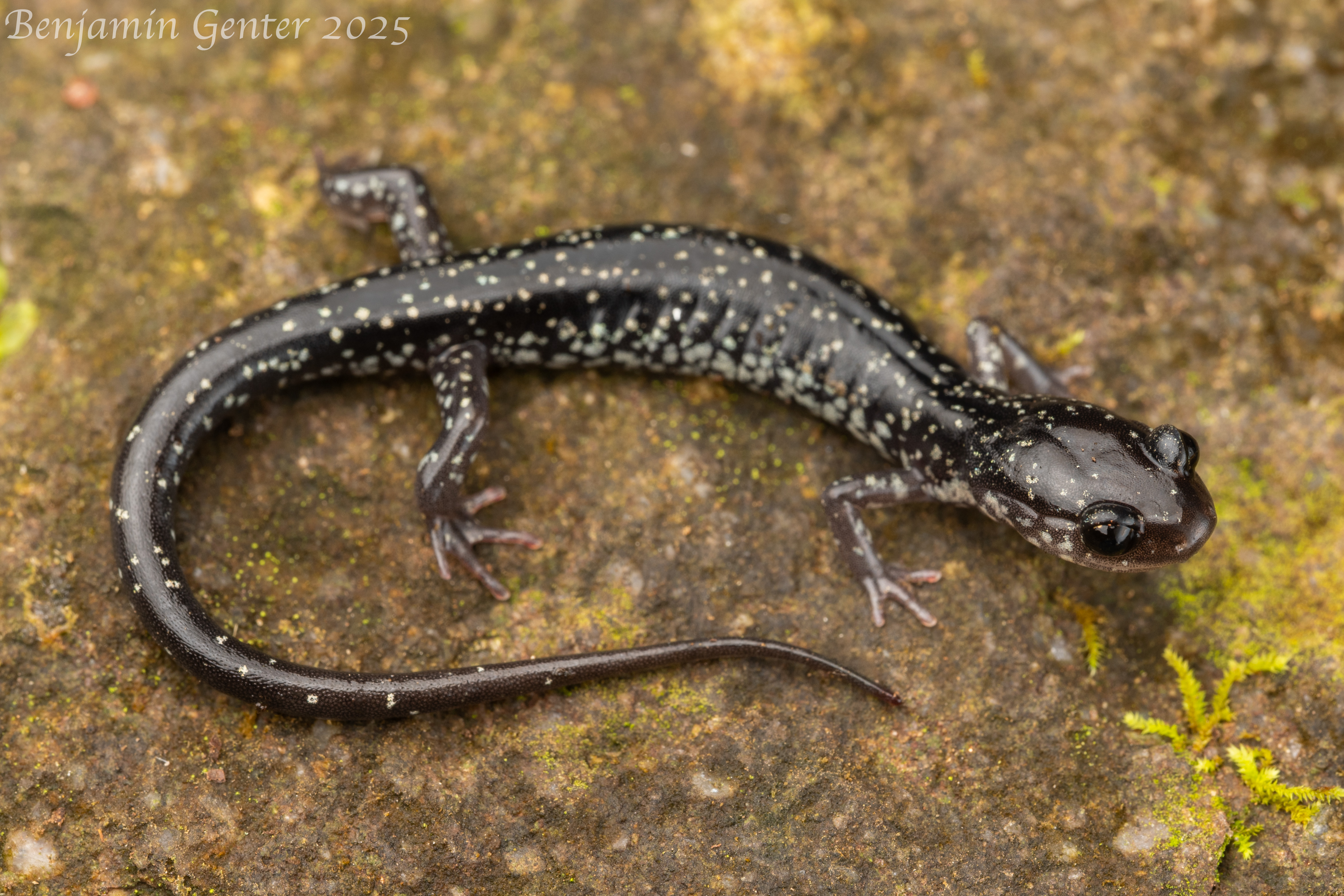

Conservation status
- Data Deficient (IUCN 3.1)

- Imperiled (NatureServe)

Scientific classification
- Kingdom: Animalia
- Phylum: Chordata
- Class: Amphibia
- Order: Urodela
- Family: Plethodontidae
- Genus: Plethodon
- Species: P. aureolus

Binomial name
- Plethodon aureolus Highton, 1983

= Tellico salamander =

Species of amphibian

The Tellico salamander (Plethodon aureolus) is a small woodland salamander resembling Plethodon glutinosus found in mountainous and lowland regions of southeastern Tennessee and extreme southwestern North Carolina. Little has been published on the species.

== Appearance ==
It has a grayish-black or black dorsum with brassy spotting. The chin is light-coloured and the sides have more concentrated yellow or white spotting. This brassy coloration is the source of the specific name aureolus, Latin for "gilded" or "ornamented". Rounded in cross section, the maximum size for adults is 151 mm (5.9 in) from tip of the snout to tip of the tail.

== Reproduction ==
Sexually active males have circular mental glands just behind the chin. The courtship ritual performed is indistinguishable from P. glutinosus. It ends with the deposition of a spermatophore by the male which is picked up by the female's cloacal lips. Chemical cues are important in species recognition and prevention of interbreeding with P. oconaluftee. Males seem to prefer the odor of female conspecifics, while females tend to prefer the odor of male heterospecifics.
