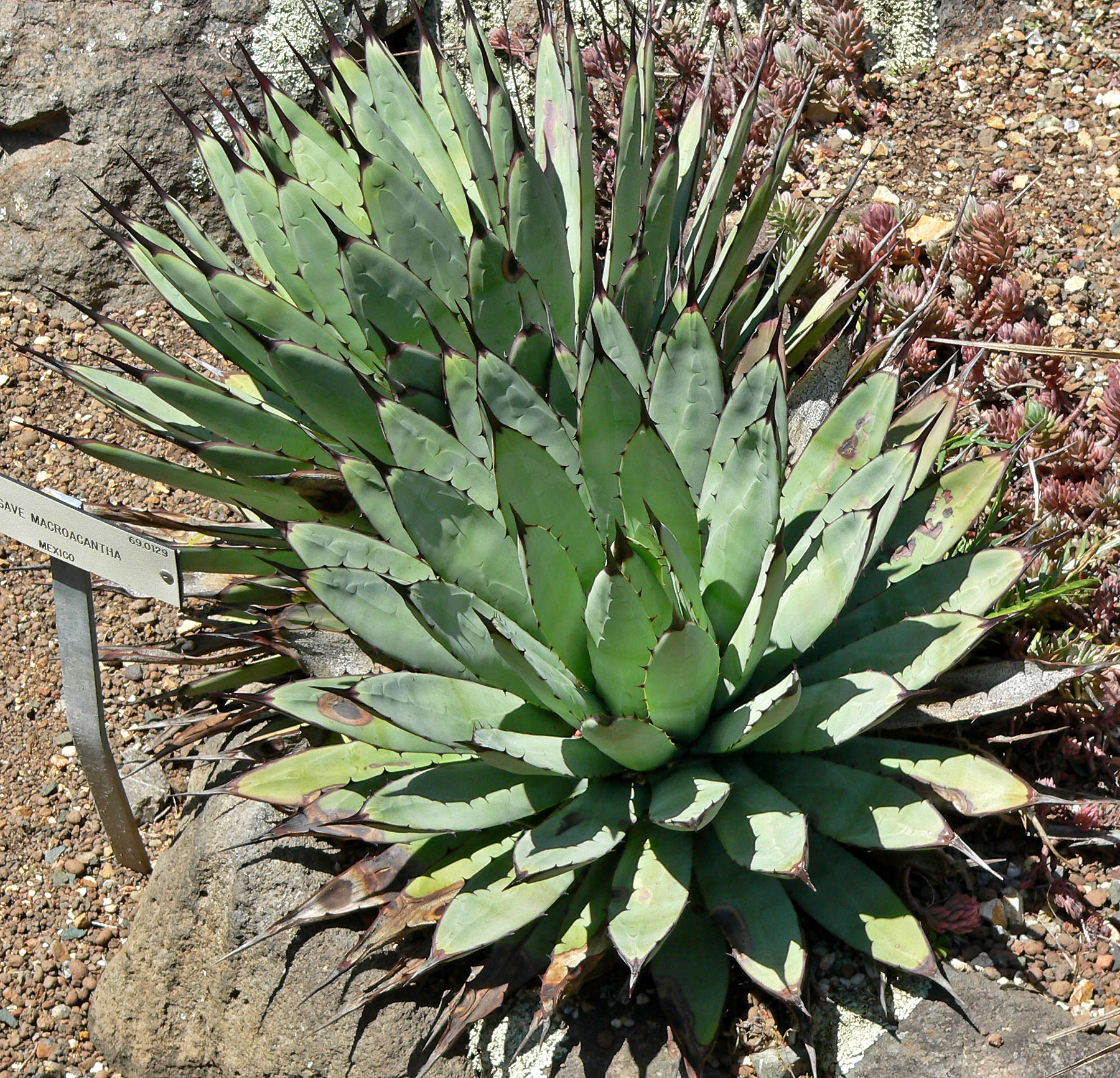

Conservation status
- Endangered (IUCN 3.1)

Scientific classification
- Kingdom: Plantae
- Clade: Tracheophytes
- Clade: Angiosperms
- Clade: Monocots
- Order: Asparagales
- Family: Asparagaceae
- Subfamily: Agavoideae
- Genus: Agave
- Species: A. macroacantha

Binomial name
- Agave macroacantha Zucc.

Synonyms
- List of synonyms: Agave flavescens var. macroacantha (Zuccarini) Jacobi 1864; Agave flavescens var. macroacantha (Herbert) Jacobi 1865; Agave pugioniformis Zucc. 1832; Agave flavescens Salm-Dyck 1834; Agave macracantha Herbert 1837 (nom. inval.); Agave besseriana Van Houtte 1868; Agave subfalcata Jacobi 1869; Agave macrantha Jacobi 1869 (nom. inval); Agave besseriana candida Jacobi 1870 (nom. inval); Agave besseriana longifolia glauca Jacobi 1870 (nom. inval); Agave besseriana longifolia viridis Jacobi 1870 (nom. inval); Agave besseriana hystix hort ex Hooker 1871; Agave linearis Jacobi 1871; Agave oligophylla Backer 1877; Agave sudburyensis Backer 1877; Agave paucifolia Backer 1878 (Nom. illeg.); Agave integrifolia Backer 1888; Agave macracantha var. integrifolia Trelease 1907; Agave macracantha var. planifolia A. Berger 1915; Agave pugioniformis Zucc. 1833

= Agave macroacantha =

Species of flowering plant

Agave macroacantha, the black-spined agave or large-thorned agave, is a species of succulent flowering plant in the family Asparagaceae naturally occurring in Oaxaca and also near the town of Tehuacan in the State of Puebla, Mexico.

== Description ==
Agave macroacantha produces a medium-sized leaf rosette that can be basal or can grow on a very short stem. Leaves are succulent, greyish green and up to 1.8 feet long at a maximum, ending in sharp black spines that are up to 1.2 inches long at the tips. Flowers are small, grey and red, growing in bunches on sturdy stems of up to 3 m (10 feet) in height.

== Cultivation ==
The plant prefers a dry, sunny and hot location for summer and from early autumn onwards a cooler, well-lit space. It likes regular watering in summer and only minimum watering in winter, and will fare well in a large pot with sparse, gravelly soil.

In the UK this plant has gained the Royal Horticultural Society's Award of Garden Merit.
