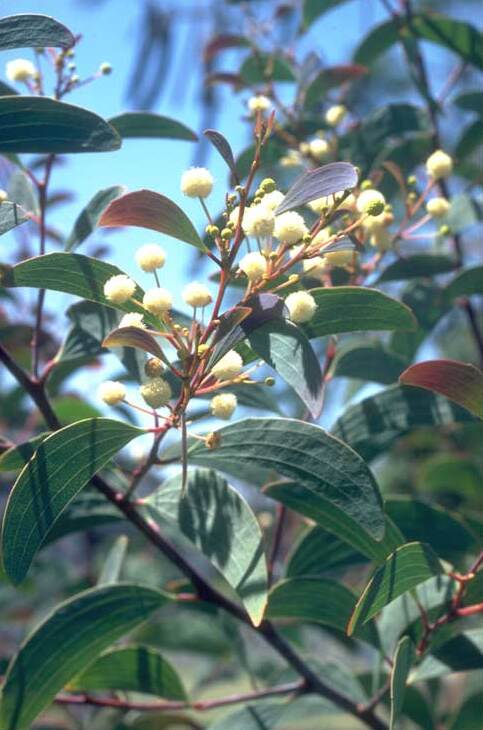
- In Townsville

Scientific classification
- Kingdom: Plantae
- Clade: Embryophytes
- Clade: Tracheophytes
- Clade: Spermatophytes
- Clade: Angiosperms
- Clade: Eudicots
- Clade: Rosids
- Order: Fabales
- Family: Fabaceae
- Subfamily: Caesalpinioideae
- Clade: Mimosoid clade
- Genus: Acacia
- Species: A. leptoloba

Binomial name
- Acacia leptoloba Pedley
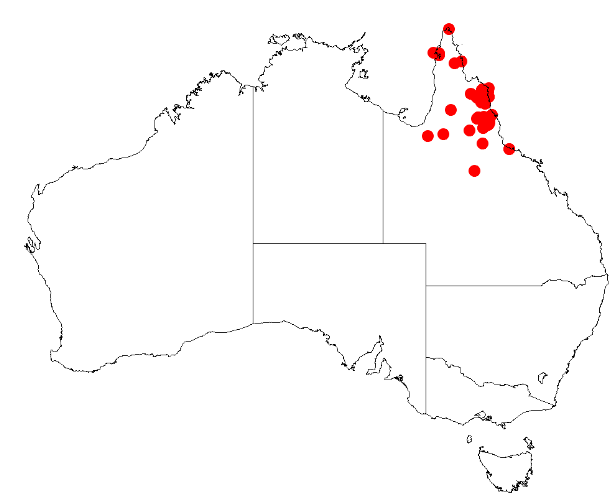
- Occurrence data from AVH

Synonyms
- Racosperma leptolobum (Pedley) Pedley

= Acacia leptoloba =

Irvinebank wattle

Species of legume

Acacia leptoloba, also known as Irvinebank wattle, is a species of flowering plant in the family Fabaceae and is endemic to northern Queensland, Australia. It is a spreading shrub or tree with glabrous branchlets, narrowly elliptic, slightly curved, leathery phyllodes, spherical heads of white flowers, and thin, flat pods.

== Description ==
Acacia leptoloba is a spreading shrub or tree that typically grows to a height of 3–5 m (9.8–16.4 ft) and has a glabrous branchlets, sometimes covered in a fine white powdery coating. Its phyllodes are narrowly elliptic, slightly curved, 70–120 mm (2.8–4.7 in) long and 18–33 mm (0.71–1.30 in) wide with three main longitudinal veins. The flowers are borne in spherical heads in racemes 10–40 mm (0.39–1.57 in) long on glabrous peduncles 7–15 mm (0.28–0.59 in) long, each head about 8 mm (0.31 in) in diameter with 40 to 75 white flowers. Flowering occurs between December and April, and the pods are thin, flat, up to 80 mm (3.1 in) long and about 20 mm (0.79 in) wide and glabrous. The seeds are 5.5–6.0 mm (0.22–0.24 in) long with a cup-shaped aril.

== Taxonomy ==
Acacia leptoloba was first formally described in 1978 by Leslie Pedley in the journal Austrobaileya from a specimen collected 5 km (3.1 mi) south of Laura River, 68 km (42 mi) south-west of Cooktown in 1975.

== Distribution and habitat ==
This species of wattle has a scattered distribution from Cape York Peninsula to Herberton in north Queensland, where it grows on hills and along streams in sandy soils. The plant is quite common around the Irvinebank area.

== See also ==
- List of Acacia species
