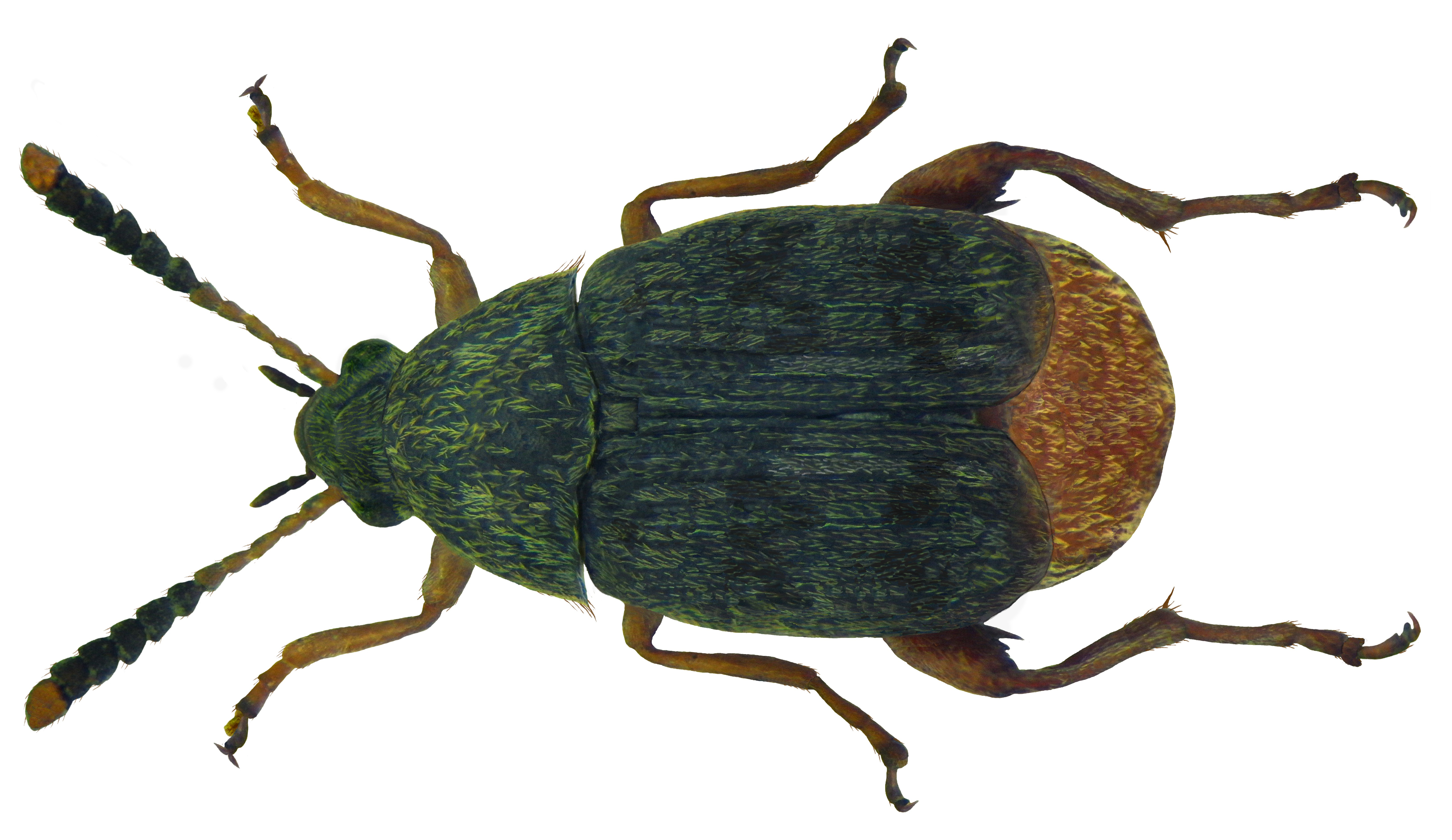

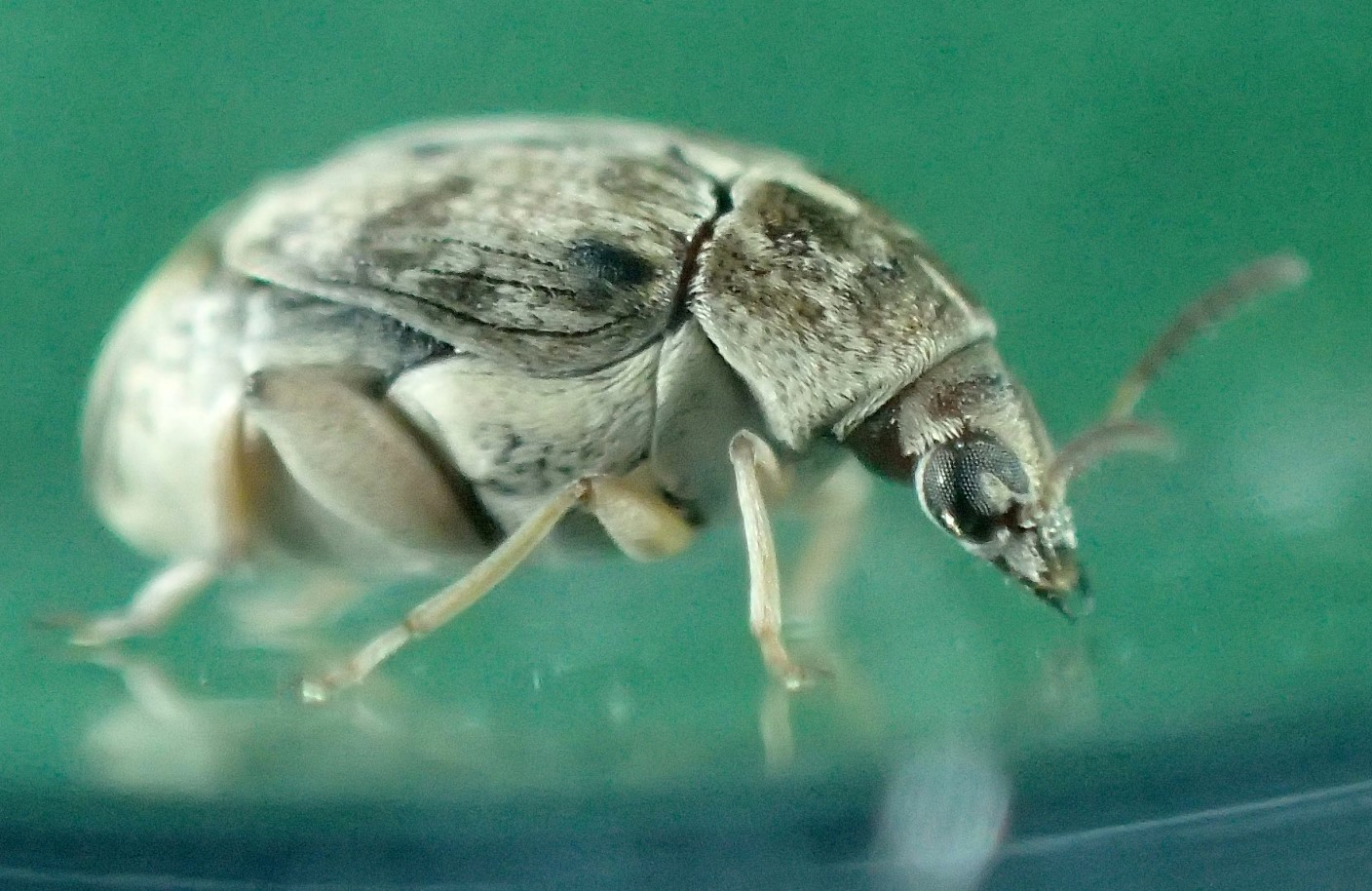

Scientific classification
- Kingdom: Animalia
- Phylum: Arthropoda
- Clade: Pancrustacea
- Class: Insecta
- Order: Coleoptera
- Suborder: Polyphaga
- Infraorder: Cucujiformia
- Family: Chrysomelidae
- Genus: Acanthoscelides
- Species: A. obtectus

Binomial name
- Acanthoscelides obtectus (Say, 1831)

Synonyms
- Bruchus obtectus Say, 1831; Mylabris mimosae (Oliver, 1811); Mylabris obtectus (Say, 1831)

= Acanthoscelides obtectus =

Bean weevil

Species of beetle

Acanthoscelides obtectus, the bean weevil, is a species of bruchid beetle. The species was described in 1831 by Thomas Say.

Bean weevils feed primarily on the seeds of common beans but also feed on the seeds of peas, vetches, and many other leguminous plants. They have also been reported to develop on the seeds of a few non-legumes, such as maize and buckwheat. Bean weevils are pests of legume seeds both in field and in storage. Only the larvae feed on seeds: the adults feed on pollen.

Originating in mountainous regions of northern South America, it has been inadvertently introduced to Central America, then around the world in grain shipments.

== Taxonomy ==
American naturalist Thomas Say described the bean weevil species as Bruchus obtectus in 1831, and was later moved to the genus Acanthoscelides. In a 1870 publication John Lawrence LeConte mistakenly called it Bruchus obsoletus, which led several later author to call it under this name which in fact belonged to another species, and as a result references to A. obtectus in publications from the late 1800 and early 1900 often used the incorrect name Bruchus obsoletus.

== Description ==
Bean weevils are small beetles, ranging in size from 2 to 5 mm. They range in colour from light to dark brown, with longitudinal spots on their elytra, which has a red posterior border. Eleytra does not cover the abdominal end. Legs are yellow red and antenna red brown. The head is bent forward and lacks the long snout that is characteristic of true weevils.

Eggs are milky white. Larvae are white with a yellow head during their first instar and white with a brownish head from the second instar. Larvae have bristles and three pairs of legs.

== Life cycle ==
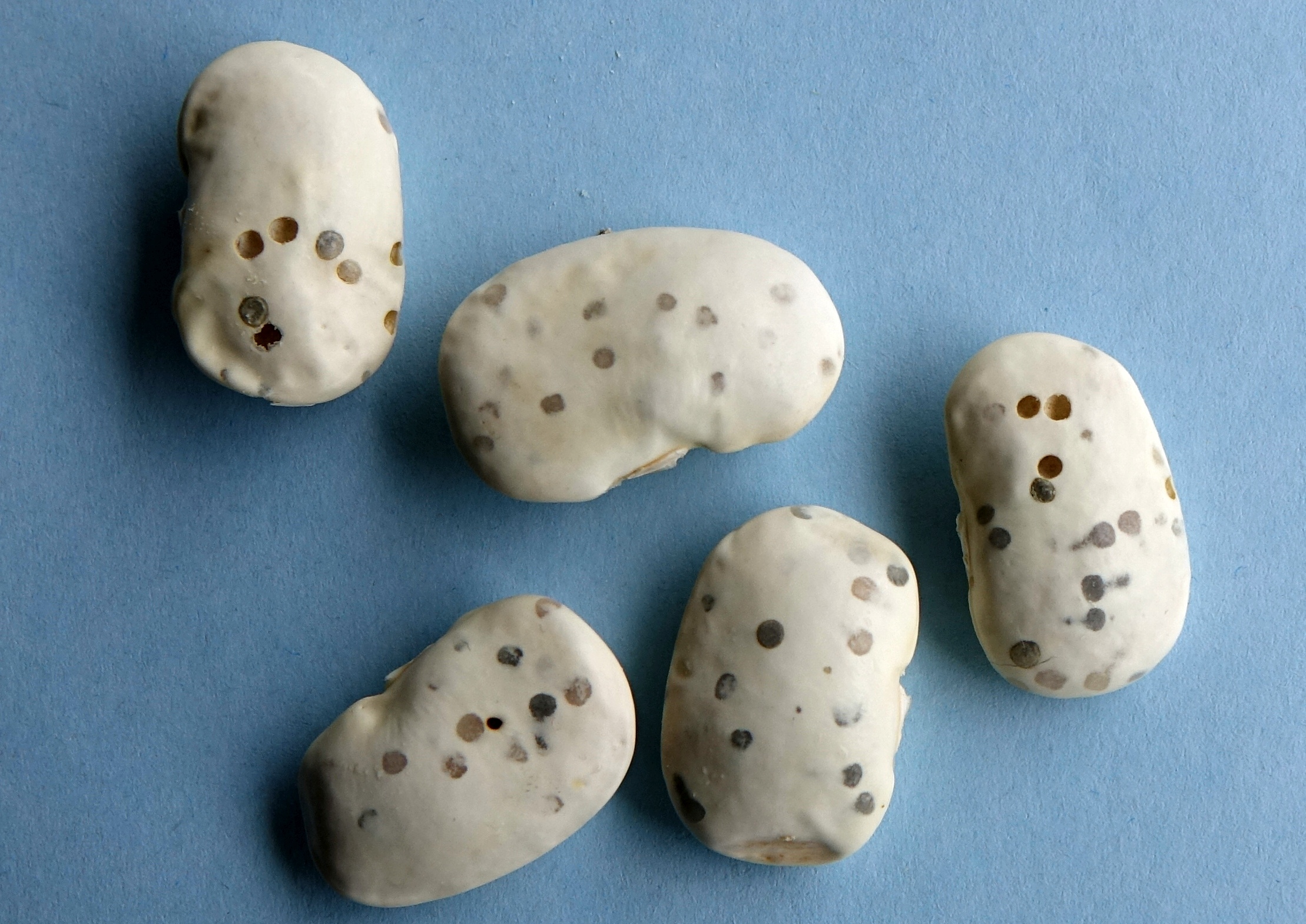
Infected beans

Bean weevils develop and feed upon leguminous plants. Adult bean weevils hibernate inside the seeds or seed pods of these plants. Adults emerge from hibernation in April to mate. Female bean weevils lay eggs onto seed pods, or into them by chewing holes, in groups of 2 to 20 eggs. A single female can lay up to 200 eggs. but 40 is average fecundity. Egg development can take 30 to 45 days before a 1st instar larvae merges. After approximately 3 days the larvae then moults and becomes a second instar larvae which then begin to consume the seed, with the larval stage lasting 3 to 3 1/2 weeks in total. The larvae then pupates inside the seed, taking 9 to 29 days. The life cycle of a single generation takes from 100 to 110 days. If the seeds are stored in a warm place multiple generations can be produced one after another.

== Distribution and habitat ==
Bean weevils are originally native to northern South America, however grain shipments at the end of the 19th century introduced the species to Europe where it subsequently spread around the globe. It is now found in Europe, Asia, North and South America, Africa, Australia and elsewhere.

The species favours warmer climates, with the most favourable temperatures being 27–29 °C for adults, 24–27 °C for larvae, and 22–26 °C for pupa. Temperatures higher or lower than this can cause a decrease in the number of eggs laid and they are very vulnerable to temperatures below 0 °C. This limits the species to how far north it can spread, and is found only as far north as northern Lithuania, with some being found in south-west Siberia.

== As parasite host ==
A number of parasitoid wasps are associated with the bean weevil larvae.

== As a pest species ==
The bean weevil is a significant pest in some parts of the world, especially in areas such as Australia where it is non-native. It damages crops both in situ and when stored in warehouses, and can potentially reduce crop yields by 60% as the larvae develop at the expense of the seeds.
