= Fremont National Forest =

Region of south central Oregon

The Fremont-Winema National Forest of south central Oregon is a mountainous region with a rich geological, ecological, archaeological, and historical heritage. Founded in 1908, the Fremont National Forest was originally protected as the Goose Lake Forest Reserve in 1906. The name was soon changed to Fremont National Forest, named after John C. Frémont, who explored the area for the United States Army Corps of Engineers in 1843. It absorbed part of Paulina National Forest on July 19, 1915. In 2002, it was administratively combined with the Winema National Forest as the Fremont–Winema National Forests.

== Geography ==
The Fremont National Forest is the eastern portion of the Fremont-Winema National Forest, which combined comprises a significant portion of south-central Oregon. Yamsay Mountain is located in the extreme north-northwest of the forest region. The Winema portion includes Crater Lake and the eastern slopes of the Cascade Mountains. The Fremont portion includes an area that begins on the shores of Klamath Marsh in the west, Hagger Mountain in the north, Winter Rim on the east, and down to the California border between near Lakeview, Oregon. This area of Oregon region is nicknamed the ‘pumice plains’, referring to the area having borne the brunt of tephra deposition during the eruption of Mount Mazama (Crater Lake) in 7,620 BP.

The climate is significantly drier on the east side of the Cascades, resulting in a rainshadow effect. This difference in precipitation between the lower and higher elevations of forested areas spans two Köppen climate classifications. The majority of the Fremont is Csb: warm summer Mediterranean, whereas elevations of 7,000 feet and higher are designated as Dsc: dry summer subarctic, (Climate Data.org 2016). Precipitation primarily in the form of winter rains and snow pack feed watersheds that include perennial and annual creeks, fen marshes, and small lakes. Perennial rivers include the Chewaucan, Sprague, Williamson, and Sycan. Generally the landscape is relatively flat and rolling, although there are some high peaks that include Yamsay Mountain at 8,196 feet above sea level, and 8,370 foot Gearhart Mountain. Both are volcanic in origin but formed during events separate from what formed the nearby Cascade Range.

== Geology ==
The volcanoes of the Fremont Forest are typically older than the Cascades and were a result of tectonic shearing stretching the crust thin which allowed mantle magma to emerge at the surface. Crustal stretching continued through the late Miocene resulting in uplifted fault blocking of what was flat basalt landscapes, creating into towering scarp- mountains that are gently sloped on one side and terminate into a sharp scarp face on the other. The east portion of the Fremont Forest region is like this, sloping to the west and terminating in a sheer scarp face along the Summer Lake sub-basin.

== Archaeological & ethnographic history ==
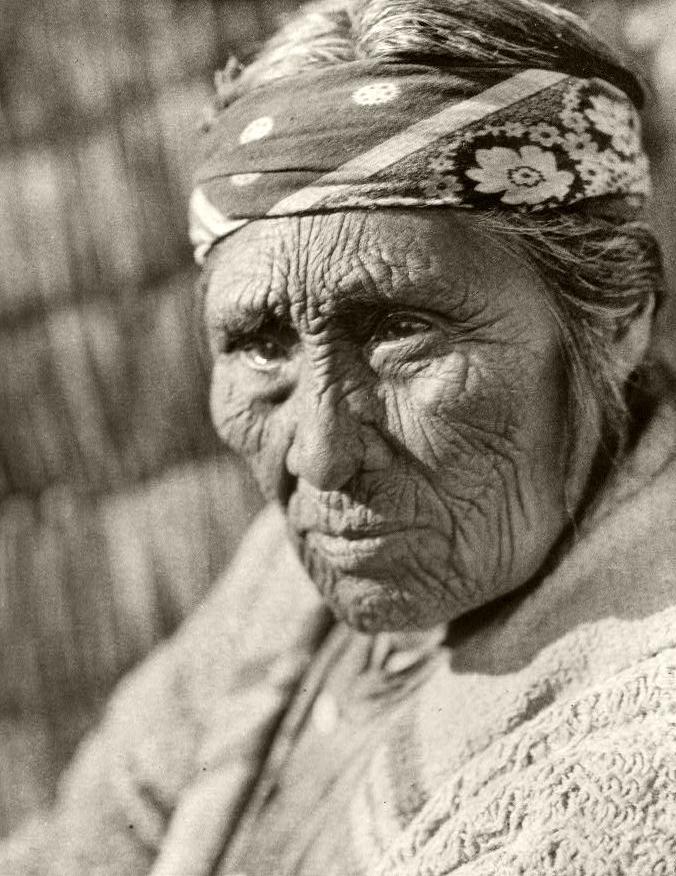
Elder Klamath woman, 1924

Human presence in the Fremont region extends back thousands of years. Physical evidence of this comes from the Paisley Caves (location of the discovery of a 14,500 year old human coprolite) Fort Rock Cave (the location of the now famous ‘oldest shoes in the world’ sagebrush sandals), and more recently, Connley Caves (where bison remains and delicate Ice Age bone needles have been found and dated to well over 10k years old). These sites are within 10 to 20 miles from the Fremont Forest boundary. Further archaeological evidence of later human activity can be found at Carlon Village and Picture Rock Pass, and many more smaller house rings and artifact scatters throughout the area. Through clear cultural relationships seen in the artifact record, as well as legends and oral knowledge tying them to this place, the decedents of these early people are the Klamath. The Paiute and Modoc also have a long and rich cultural connection to the Fremont Forest.

Native people were quickly moved out of their traditional territories through the late 1800s into the mid-1900s as a response to Euro-American settlers in the region that were attracted to rich forest resources and ranching possibilities. The exception was Yamsay Mountain which remained part of the 1901 Klamath Reservation until 1911 when it became listed as part of the Paulina National Forest and was later ceded to the Fremont National Forest in 1913. The Klamath tried to recover their previous lands, but in 1954 the Klamath Termination Act meant that the tribe's remaining 525,700 acres of former Indian reservation lands, almost all within the Fremont Forest region, were placed under National Forest administration under the 1953 House Concurrent Resolution 108 (HCR-108). Klamath tribal designation was restored in 1986.

== Euro-American arrival ==
Euro-American traders began entering the Klamath area at some point between 1825 and 1827, where they worked as trappers for the Hudson's Bay Company. The Fremont National Forest was established in 1908 and was named for Captain John C. Fremont, who passed through the area in 1843. After trade routes inland and to the Pacific were opened up in 1846, Fort Klamath was built in 1863 and the Klamath reservation was established. In the beginning the Klamath were able to keep Yamsay Mountain in their territory, but vast economic opportunities present was too much for the federal government to resist. Trappers may have begun the early movements of Euro-Americans into the area, but it was the harvesting of old growth ponderosa pine timber that was the real draw later in the 19th century. Ecological damage done by excessive logging was exacerbated by the introduction of sheep and cattle ranching, complete fire suppression, and other activities which remain visible on the landscape to this day.

== Ecology ==
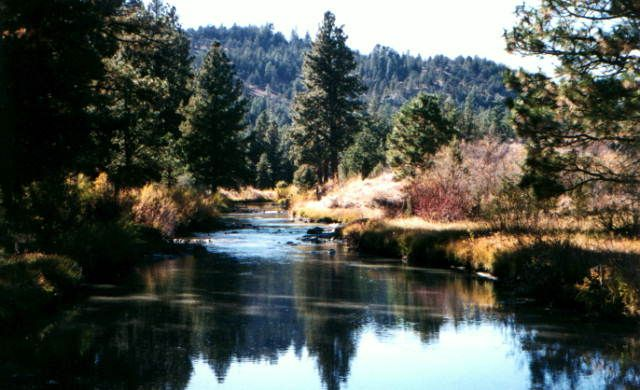
Drews Creek, Fremont National Forest

The Fremont Forest region is listed as part of the Mazama ecoregion due to high amounts of Mazama tephra covering the landscape as a result of its catastrophic eruption 7,620 years ago that resulted in the formation of Crater Lake. Fremont ecology is at once fragile and robust, with dominant trees including ponderosa and lodgepole pines, juniper, willow in wetter areas, and occasional firs in some higher elevations as well as over 925 vascular plant species. Examples of herbaceous plants and shrubs include Nootka rose, biscuit root, bitterroot, ipos (wild carrot), gooseberries, service berries, wild strawberries, lily bulbs, and, in wetter areas, camas, wokus (yellow pond lily), and cattails. The Fremont area differs from the Winema area in that it has slightly less tree diversity. This is due to two primary factors: the Cinema encompasses a greater elevation range, and receives more precipitation, due to its location on the east slopes of the Cascades, which provides alpine and subalpine environments.

Fauna includes deer, elk, black bears, coyotes, badgers, many types of rodents, jackrabbits and rabbits, cougars, bobcats, porcupines, Reptiles and amphibians. Endangered endemic fauna includes the Larch Mountain salamander (Plethodon larselli), a rare, lungless amphibian that lives on steep talus slopes. Golden and bald eagles are permanent fixtures, as well as hawks, herons, sandhill cranes, and many migratory birds that move along the Pacific flyway.

=== Fire ecology ===
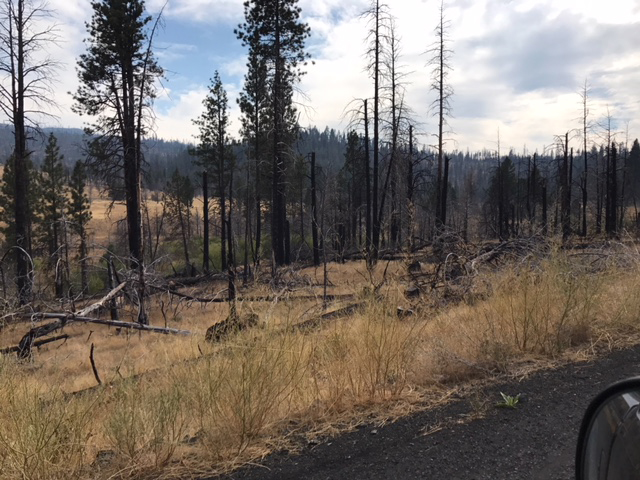
Burned ponderosa pine from 2012 Barry Point Fire. Photo taken on road to Dog Lake.

Fire is a necessary component to the health and structure of a meso-xeric landscape forest structure. State, federal, and tribal land managers recognize this and are moving research and implementation of fire regimes along quickly in order to minimize possible future threats to forest, water resources, human health and properties.

An assessment of prehistoric forest composition will be of benefit to understanding how climate change might affect future forest structure and thus, better informed management. The genera described below are primary forest structure trees as listed by which trees make up the primary composition of the Fremont forest. This list comes from a combination of primary literature that includes academic studies as well as forestry reports and genera surveys.

Forest zones east of the Cascades are generally defined as being Rocky Mountain forest types. The Fremont is on the boundary of the floristic Great Basin and reflects this with the presence of typical Great Basin flora, including sagebrush (Artemisia sp.) and bitterbrush (Purshia sp.). The dominant conifer species is ponderosa pine (Pinus ponderosa). Current ecological structures are the result of 100 years of fire suppression.

Shrub-steppe flora of the Basin and Range mix with ponderosa pine communities. Fire is a natural and regular occurrence in this region, which is reflected in the flora and fauna evolved to make use of cyclical fire regimes and species distributions are rapidly affected depending on the presence or lack of fire cycles.

== Tree species of Fremont National Forest ==
| Species | Autecology |
|---|---|
| Ponderosa pine (Pinus ponderosa) | The dominant conifer species of the east of the Cascade Range. Ponderosas range in height of mature trees range up to 232 feet in height, diameter trunks range from 30 to 50 inches and can live from 300 to 600 years. Fire is a critical component to the ponderosa lifecycle. Ponderosas have thick bark that allows for low intensity fires to burn without damaging the inner cambium, have relatively light lichen cover to also reduce fire fuels on their trunks, drop their lower branches as they mature, reducing possibility of fuel for fire to reach the open canopy, and have high moisture content within their leaves. Ponderosa also have deep roots that can escape most fire damage. Seedlings thrive and grow quickly in mineral-rich soils left behind by fires. Ponderosa do not thrive in shaded areas, and therefore can be out-competed by fast growing, shade-tolerant tree species. Their cones are not considered serotinous fire dependent for opening to drop seeds. Fire shapes the composition of ponderosa forests. Early Euro-Americans reported open parklands in the 1800s with relatively little fuel (smaller trees, shrubs) in the understory. However, since fire suppression efforts began in the 1800s, potential fire fuels increased greatly and rapidly, resulting in an increased risk of high intensity, stand-replacing fires. Fire kills ponderosa saplings that have not matured enough to develop their fire defenses, which is what traditionally led to well-spaced mature trees, which have a higher survival rate due to these fire adaptations. The primary threat of fire to a mature ponderosa is crown scorch. |
| Lodgepole pine (Pinus contorta) | This species exists in various areas throughout the Fremont forest region, particularly at higher elevations and in areas with thick deposits of Mazama tephra. P. contorta is a successional conifer, meaning that it rapidly colonizes disturbed areas, but is also highly shade and fire intolerant. They grow 40–150 feet in height, with a trunk diameter not exceeding 30 inches and can live 150–200 years. Evolutionarily they seem to have traded speed in growth and regeneration over longevity and fire hardiness. Lodgepole pines can rapidly move into disturbed areas which may be due to a variable rooting system that can take advantage of deep or shallow soils. There is evidence that they may fix nitrogen with their root systems. Although lodgepole is fire sensitive, lodgepole cones are often serotinous, releasing seed after fire. They are also highly susceptible to insect infestations and disease, particularly lodgepole pine dwarf-mistletoe (Arceuthobium americanum), all of which can alter and increase the amount and spatial distribution of fuels in lodgepole pine stands which can result in stand-replacing fires. |
| Jeffrey pine (Pinus jeffreyi) | This species is present in much of the area dividing the Fremont section from the Winema section. In these areas, it is often a dominant species. However, in sites with more nutrient rich soils and in mixed-conifer forests, Jeffrey pine's dominance is dependent on recurrent fire. Without fire or other disturbances that create gaps in the canopy, Jeffrey pine is often replaced by more shade-tolerant conifers such as white fir (Abies concolor). Its possible that many of the white fir in lower elevations of the eastern Cascades have replaced Jeffrey pine stands as a result of fire suppression. |
| Juniper (Juniperus occidentalis) | Juniper is endemic to this region but highly fire intolerant. Because of fire suppression juniper is beginning to outcompete and dominate many areas within the Fremont Forest and other areas in the Great Basin. Burning kills western juniper and temporarily produces herbaceous or shrubland communities, but these are typically reinvaded by junipers. Juniper is also a sparely spaced tree that outcompetes other plants, including other junipers, by dropping needles that make it near impossible for new plants to be able to grow. Aggressively invasive cheatgrass (Bromus tectorum) is typically able to deal with the hostile environment created by junipers, and so out also outcompetes native forbs and grasses and increases risk of fire spread. |

=== Balance between fire suppression and prescribed burning ===
The suppression of fire for the last 100 years within the Fremont has resulted in an increase in fuel loads that lead to too hot forest fires that kill the plants evolved to depend on recurrent fire or create stands of shade-tolerant trees replacing shade-intolerant species, thus altering the structure of the ecosystem. This stand structures can lead to more intense fires, given the right fuel moisture and wind conditions, due to an increase in understory and smaller trees growing closer together. This may also increase susceptibility to disease and insect outbreaks. These results have led to loss of natural diversity, and an increased risk of severe fires threatening homes and lives. Prescribed fires reducing fuel loads beneath existing stands of ponderosa pine have proven useful in reducing the potential threat of wildfires, while also favoring natural regeneration of seral species in many places. However, prescribed fires can lead to the loss of volatile nutrients from burn site, particularly nitrogen.
