= Modoc =

Modoc may refer to:

== Ethnic groups ==
- Modoc people, a Native American/First Nations people
  - Modoc language
  - Modoc Nation, a federally recognized tribe of Modoc
- Modoc War, the last armed resistance of the Modoc people in 1873
- The "Modocs", rival gang to the Molly Maguires

== Places in the US ==
- Modoc, Arkansas
- Modoc, Georgia
- Modoc, Illinois
- Modoc, Indiana
- Modoc, Kansas
- Modoc, South Carolina
- Modoc County, California
- Modoc Crater, a volcanic feature in Lava Beds National Monument
- Modoc National Forest, in northeastern California
- Modoc National Wildlife Refuge, in California
- Modoc Plateau, in California, Oregon, and Nevada
- Modoc Point, a cliff in Klamath County, Oregon
- Modoc Point, Oregon, a community named after the cliff

== Vessels ==
- USCGC Modoc (WPG-46), a Tampa-class Coast Guard cutter
- USS Modoc (1865), a Casco-class light draft monitor
- Modoc (YT-16), a 1890 US Navy yard tug

== Other uses ==
- MODOC, the original alias of MODOK in the works of Marvel Comics
- Modoc cypress (Cupressus bakeri), a tree species native to the homeland of the Modoc people
- Modoc sucker, an endangered California fish
- Modoc (novel), a 1998 novel by Ralph Helfer (1897–1975)
- MODOC, an acronym for the Missouri Department of Corrections
- "Modoc", a 1989 song from High Tension Wires by Steve Morse
