= Fremont National Recreation Trail =

Multi-use trail in Oregon, United States

- Length: Approx. 135 miles (217 km)
- Location: Oregon
- Designation: National Recreation Trail
- Use: Hiking
- Difficulty: Moderate to strenuous
- Season: Spring to fall
- Sights: Fremont-Winema National Forest
- Hazards: Severe weather American black bear Tick-borne disease Limited water Venomous snakes

The Fremont National Recreation Trail is a long-distance multi-use trail in Southern Oregon's Fremont-Winema National Forest. It is also known as the Southern Oregon Intertie Trail and trail #160. The trail and the national forest are named for John C. Frémont.

The route goes southeast from Yamsay Mountain to Vee Lake. It consists of two main sections separated by approximately 13 miles of rural road and highway.

== Modern use ==
In 2026, a segment of the trail near Fremont Point served as part of Love is King's Freedom to Roam expedition, in which military veterans bikepacked from Lakeview to Chemult as the subject of the documentary "Unseen", which honors the 555th Parachute Infantry Battalion's WWII firefighting service in the surrounding Fremont-Winema National Forest.
