= Lower Williamson Gorge =

Coordinates: 42.69°N 121.821°W

The Lower Williamson Gorge is located in the Winema National Forest north of Chiloquin in Klamath County, Oregon. It is formed where the Williamson River eroded its way from the Beaver Marsh area down through the escarpment north of Collier Memorial State Park into the Klamath Basin

The 1990 Land and Management Plan of the Winema National Forest stated about this section of the river:

- "The length of the river, height of the sheer rock face above the water, and visual diversity are superior to any other area on the Forest, including the (federally designated Wild and Scenic) Sycan River. In visual diversity, it is comparable to the Klamath River Canyon and the Deschutes River. The Lower Williamson Gorge was inventoried as being distinctive in rock form, vegetation, and water from. In comparison with other rivers in south or central Oregon, Segment Two of the Lower Williamson River is considered to have outstandingly remarkable scenic value and is eligible for designation under the Wild and Scenic Rivers Act."

No action has yet been taken to place the gorge under the provisions of the Wild and Scenic Rivers Act, however.

The gorge is just a short distance east of U.S. Highway 97. It is not commonly visited as it is accessed only by primitive roads. Railroad tracks run just to the east, giving AMmtrak passengers occasional views of the gorge.

Wildlife includes beaver, otters, kingfishers, yellow warblers; sometimes prairie falcons may nest on the cliffs. Flora includes willows, ponderosa pines, aspen, firs, chokecherry and elderberries. During the winter the river may run brown with tannins from the upstream Klamath Marsh; later in the summer the stream is mainly fed by springs along the canyon walls and the water becomes clear.
