= Fremont–Winema National Forest =

Protected area in the U.S. state of Oregon

Coordinates: 42°36′N 121°12′W

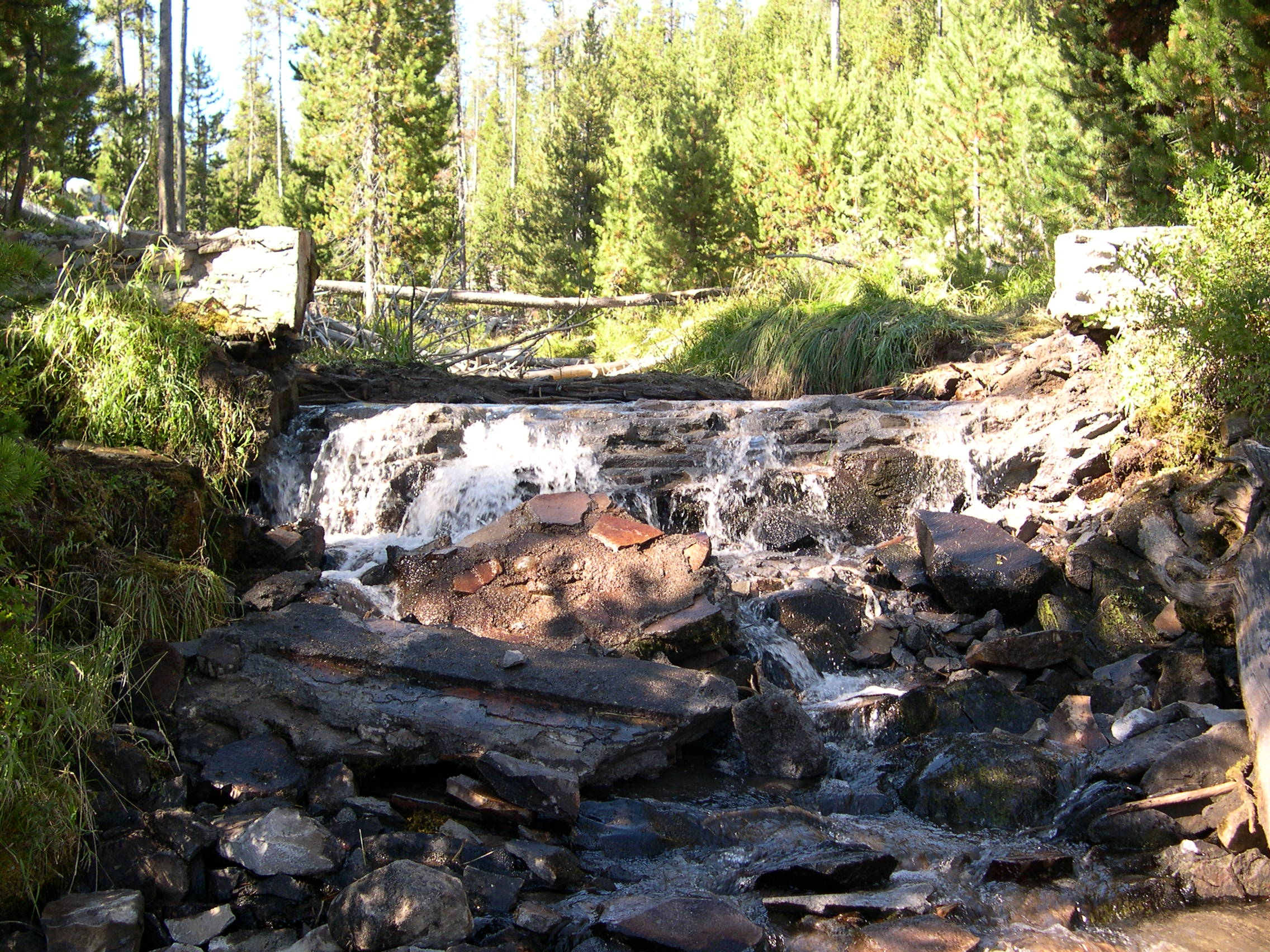
- A creek in the Winema National Forest
- Interactive map of Fremont–Winema National Forest
- Location: Lake / Klamath counties, Oregon, United States
- Nearest city: Klamath Falls, Oregon
- Area: 2,252,587 acres (9,116 km^{2})
- Established: 2002
- Governing body: U.S. Forest Service
- Website: Fremont–Winema National Forest

The Fremont–Winema National Forest is a United States National Forest formed from the 2002 merger of the Fremont and Winema National Forests. They cover territory in southern Oregon from the crest of the Cascade Range on the west past the city of Lakeview to the east. The northern end of the forests is bounded by U.S. Route 97 on the west and Oregon Route 31 on the northeast. To the south, the state border with California forms the boundary of the forests. Klamath Falls is the only city of significant size in the vicinity. The forests are managed by the United States Forest Service, and the national forest headquarters are located in Lakeview.

== Fremont National Forest ==
Fremont National Forest
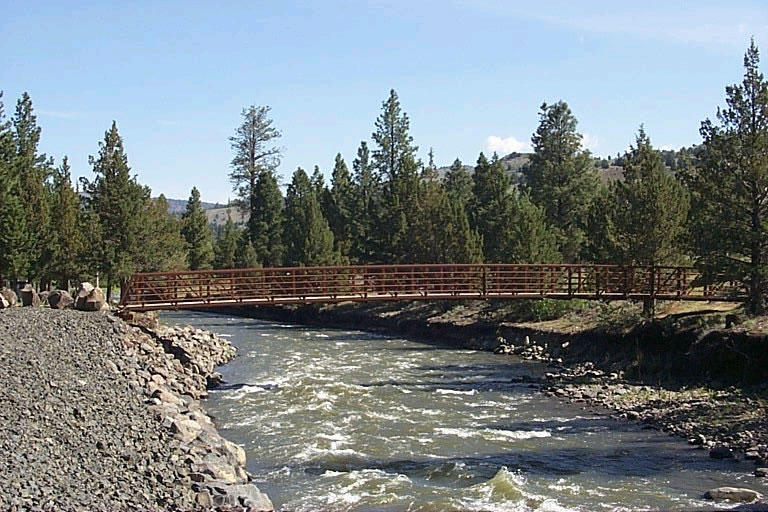
- Pedestrian bridge over the Chewaucan River in the Fremont NF
- Interactive map of Fremont National Forest
- Location: Lake / Klamath counties, Oregon, United States
- Nearest city: Klamath Falls, Oregon
- Area: 1,207,039 acres (4,885 km^{2})
- Established: September 17, 1906
- Visitors: 428,000 (in 2006)
- Governing body: U.S. Forest Service

The Fremont National Forest was named after John C. Frémont, who explored the area for the United States Army Corps of Engineers in 1843. It is located in western Lake and eastern Klamath counties in Oregon and has a land area of 1,207,039 acres (4,885 km^{2}). There are local ranger district offices located in Bly, Lakeview, Paisley, and Silver Lake. The Warner Canyon Ski Area was part of Fremont until a land swap transferred ownership to Lake County.

=== History ===
Founded in 1908, the Fremont National Forest was originally protected as the Goose Lake Forest Reserve in 1906. The name was soon changed to Fremont National Forest. It absorbed part of Paulina National Forest on July 19, 1915. In 2002, it was administratively combined with the Winema National Forest as the Fremont–Winema National Forests.

=== Ecology ===
A 1993 Forest Service study estimated that the extent of old growth (economic definition) in the forest was 549,800 acres (222,500 ha), 113,800 acres (46,100 ha) of which were lodgepole pine forests.

The sites of two former uranium mines, the White King and Lucky Lass mines, are within the Fremont National Forest. They are now remediated Superfund sites, and related Lakeview Mining Company uranium mill has also been remediated.

=== Recreation ===
Common recreational activities in the Fremont National Forest include hiking, camping, boating, backpacking, horseback riding, mountain biking, skiing, hunting, and fishing. The 50-mile (80 km) Fremont National Recreation Trail runs northwest–southeast between Government Harvey Pass and Cox Pass in the forest.

== Winema National Forest ==
Winema National Forest
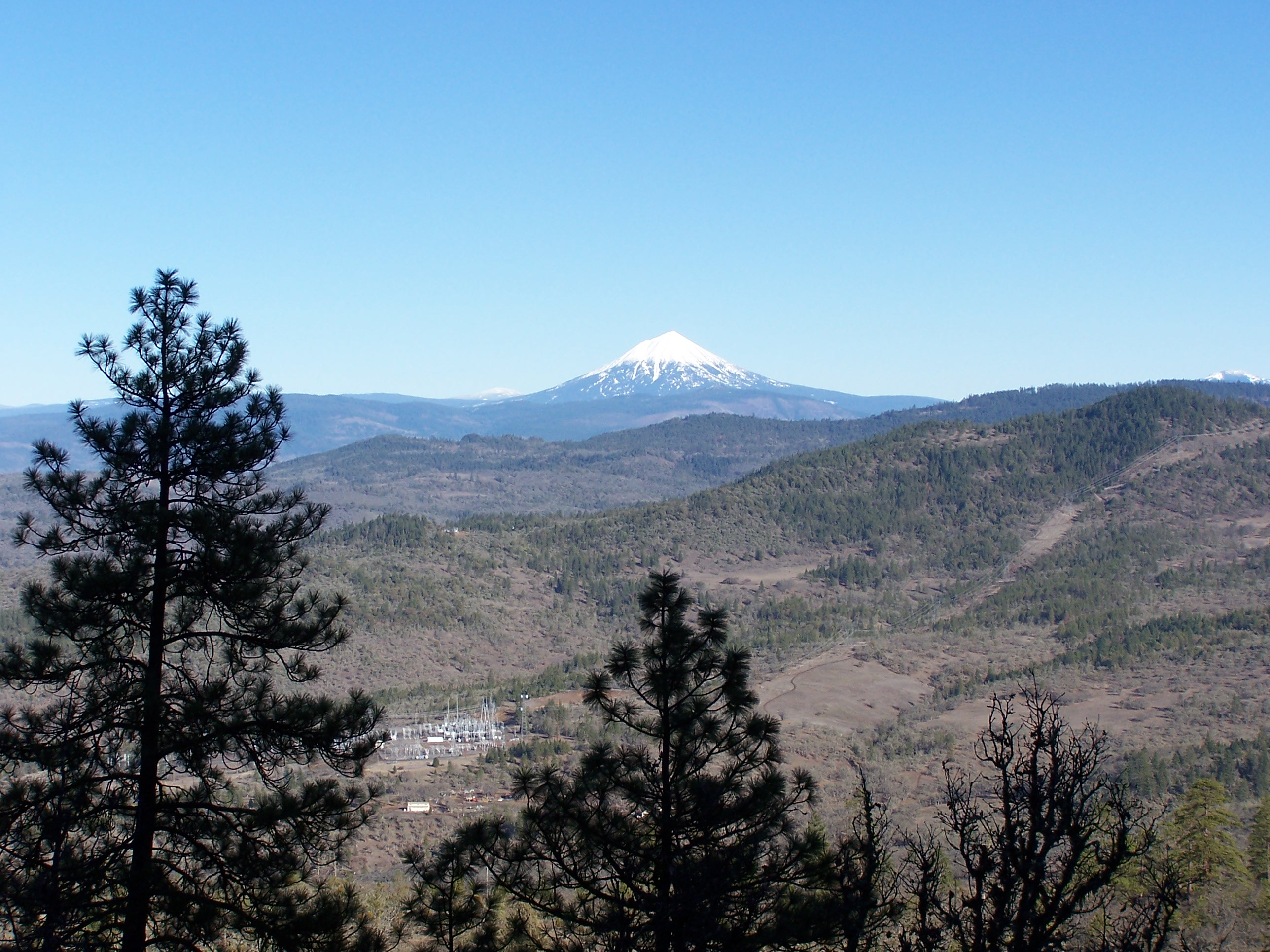
- Aspen Caldera, Mountain Lakes Wilderness, Winema NF
- Interactive map of Winema National Forest
- Location: Klamath County, Oregon, United States
- Nearest city: Klamath Falls, Oregon
- Area: 1,045,548 acres (4,231 km^{2})
- Established: July 1, 1961
- Visitors: 498,000 (in 2006)
- Governing body: U.S. Forest Service

The Winema National Forest is a national forest in Klamath County on the eastern slopes of the Cascades in south-central Oregon and covers 1,045,548 acres (4,231 km^{2}). The forest borders Crater Lake National Park near the crest of the Cascades and stretches eastward into the Klamath Basin. Near the floor of the basin the forest gives way to vast marshes and meadows associated with Upper Klamath Lake and the Williamson River drainage. To the north and east, extensive stands of ponderosa and lodgepole pine grow on deep pumice and ash that blanketed the area during the eruption of Mount Mazama nearly 7,000 years ago. A 1993 Forest Service study estimated that the extent of old growth (economic definition) in the forest was 711,674 acres (288,004 ha).

There are local ranger district offices located in Chemult, Chiloquin, and Klamath Falls.

=== History ===
Founded in 1961, the Winema National Forest mainly consisted of former Klamath Reservation land. The remaining land outside of the reservation boundary was initially protected as the Cascade Range Forest Reserve from 1893 to 1907, when it became the Cascade (South) National Forest. In 1908, it changed to the Mazama National Forest and then Crater Lake National Forest until 1932. The land was part of the Rogue River National Forest from 1932 to 1961, when it was designated the Winema National Forest. It was named after Toby Riddle, a Modoc woman also known as "Winema" who served as a translator for the US Army during the Modoc War of 1872 to 1873. In 2002, it was administratively combined with the Fremont National Forest, named after John C. Fremont (see Fremont NF History). The Winema National Forest separately is the third-largest national forest (after the Nez Perce National Forest and the Okanogan–Wenatchee National Forest) that is contained entirely within one county.

=== Klamath Reservation ===
More than 50 percent of the forest is former Klamath Indian Reservation land. As part of the Indian Termination Policy that began in the 1950s, the United States Congress enacted a few termination acts directed at specific tribes who held wealth in the form of natural resources such as water (for the irrigation of crops) and timber (supplying building material for the post WWII suburban housing boom). The Klamth Tribe was particularly well-off in that regard, having vast quantities of water and timber within their reservation boundary. The Klamath Tribe was also likely vulnerable to government termination due to factionalism within the tribe that largely resulted from cultural assimilation effects of the previous decades. On the date of the act, a roll was taken of the tribe, locking in those eligible for property rights to tribal land. After this process, the collective land was divided among each individual on the roll and a vote was conducted on whether to withdraw from the tribe, those that remained would have their portion put back into a collective of land.

Given that estimates suggest seventy percent of tribal members would withdraw, selling their land for commercial use, the government and lumber industry became equally concerned with how the increase in Klamath Forest timber would saturate the industry. The act was then amended to put commercial sales into the hands of the Forest Service, who implemented a sustainable yield policy in regards to the former Klamath Forest.

In the end, seventy-seven percent of the tribe voted to withdraw, shrinking the reservation down from 762,000 acres (308,000 ha) to 145,000 acres (57,000 ha). Two purchases by the US government - the first in 1963 of about 500,000 acres (200,000 ha) and the second in 1973 of about 135,000 acres (55,000 ha) - were combined with portions of three other national forests to form the Winema National Forest.

Members of the Klamath tribe reserve specific rights of hunting, fishing, trapping, and gathering of forest materials on former reservation land within the Winema National Forest.

== Flora and fauna ==
There are over 300 species of wildlife and fish that occur in this region.

=== Flora ===
There are about 925 species of documented vascular plants in the Fremont National Forest. The vascular plants provide food and habitat for mammals, fish, insects and mankind. Management to ensure that all native species maintain healthy populations is a focus of the Forest Service. There are numerous wildflowers and rare species of plants found in the forest.

=== Fauna ===
Game animals include elk, pronghorn and mule deer. There are several types of trout in the region's streams and lakes, and a few lakes also support largemouth bass, a warm-water fish. Canada geese, mallards and whistling swans are frequently seen waterfowl. Porcupines, badgers and coyotes frequently roam within this forest. Black bears, cougars and bobcats are also present in smaller populations.

==== Threatened and endangered species ====
The following threatened and endangered species are found in the Fremont–Wimema National Forest region:

- Bull trout (threatened)
- Northern Spotted Owl (threatened)

== Wilderness areas ==
There are four officially designated wilderness areas within the Fremont–Winema National Forest that are part of the National Wilderness Preservation System. Two of these extend into neighboring national forests (as indicated).

- Gearhart Mountain Wilderness
- Mount Thielsen Wilderness (partly in Umpqua NF and in Deschutes NF)
- Mountain Lakes Wilderness
- Sky Lakes Wilderness (mostly in Rogue River NF)

== See also ==
- List of national forests of the United States
- High Cascades Complex Fires
- Lower Williamson Gorge
