= Hager Mountain =

Volcanic peak in Oregon

- pasiakwao (Northern Paiute)
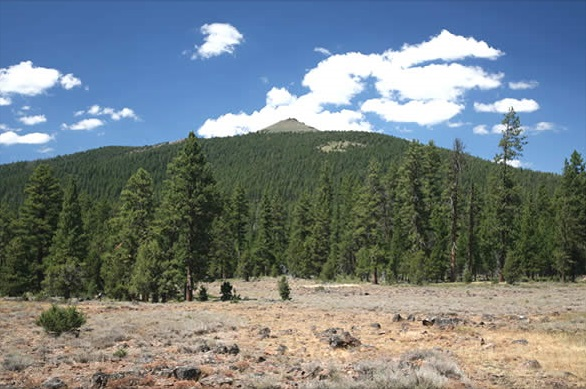
- Base-to-summit view of Hager Mountain

Highest point
- Elevation: 7,189 ft (2,191 m) NAVD 88
- Prominence: 1,455 ft (443 m)
- Coordinates: 43°00′34″N 121°01′54″W

Geography
- Location within Oregon
- Location: Lake County, Oregon, U.S.
- Topo map: USGS Hager Mountain

Geology
- Rock age: Over 5 million years
- Mountain type: Silicic lava dome

Climbing
- Easiest route: Steep road (for government lookout use only)
- Normal route: Hike

Hager Mountain (Northern Paiute: pasiakwao and Klamath: Chock-chock-lisk-se) is a volcanic peak in Oregon in the northwest corner of the Basin and Range Province in the United States. The mountain is located south of the small unincorporated community of Silver Lake in south-central Oregon, and it is in the Fremont–Winema National Forest. On the summit, there is a fire lookout operated during the summer and fall by the United States Forest Service. There are several hiking trails that lead to the lookout station.

== Geography and geology ==
Hager Mountain is located on the edge of Oregon's high desert in the northwest corner of the Basin and Range Province of the western United States. The mountain is in Lake County, approximately 10 miles (16 km) south of the small unincorporated community of Silver Lake. The summit of Hager Mountain is at 7,189 feet (2,191 m). The mountain's topographic prominence is 1,455 feet (443 m).

Hager Mountain is a large silicic lava dome structure that was formed approximately 5.9 million years ago. The mountain's primary rock is from the Hayes Butte Basalt flows. The eruptions that produced these flows came from a fault zone running southeast–northwest between Hager Mountain and Hayes Butte. The eruptions that created Hager Mountain released lava that flowed down the slopes of the volcanic dome onto plains around the mountain. The Hayes Butte Basalt overlays the Fort Rock Formation and earlier Picture Rock Basalt layers. All of these lava flows occurred during the Pliocene epoch. The Hayes Butte Basalt flows that form Hager occurred near the end of that epoch.

When exposed on the surface, Hayes Butte Basalt generally weathers into a thin and rocky soil. Today, Hager Mountain's soil is a loose, unconsolidated mix of fine alluvial particles, gravel, and a variety of larger rock fragments. Common surface rocks include basalt, andesite, pumice, and obsidian.

== Environment and ecology ==
Hager Mountain lies east of the Cascade Range in the northwestern corner of North America's basin and range environment. To the west, ponderosa and lodgepole pine forest extends to the timberline on the Cascade peaks, approximately 50 miles (80 km) away. The areas north and east of the mountain are drier, typical high-desert country.

The middle and lower slopes of Hager Mountain are covered in a pine forest with an understory dominated by low sagebrush. Other understory shrubs include curl-leaf mountain mahogany, and antelope bitterbrush. Low groundcover plants include Indian paintbrush, yellow balsamroots, nineleaf biscuitroot, scabland fleabane, woolly sunflower, common yarrow, low pussytoes, and slender phlox. Common grasses on the mountain include Idaho fescue, bluebunch wheatgrass, wild rye, prairie junegrass. A few western junipers grow on the lower slopes on the northeast side of the mountain.

Hager Mountain and the surrounding area host a wide variety of wildlife. Larger mammals found in the area include black-tailed deer, elk, coyotes, black bear, bobcats, and cougars. Smaller mammals include American badgers, porcupines, striped skunks, black-tailed jackrabbits, white-tailed jackrabbits, pygmy rabbits, golden-mantled ground squirrels, and least chipmunks.

Forest birds common to the Hager Mountain area include mountain chickadee, Lazuli bunting, green-tailed towhee, MacGillivray's warbler, white-crowned sparrow, sage sparrow, black-headed grosbeak, Woodhouse's scrub jay, Pinyon jay, and black-billed magpie. There are also at least three woodpecker species that live on or near Hager Mountain, including the black-backed woodpecker, white-headed woodpecker, and Lewis's woodpecker. Larger birds found in the area include barn owls, great gray owls, great horned owls, red-tailed hawks, turkey vultures, golden eagles, and bald eagles.

== History ==
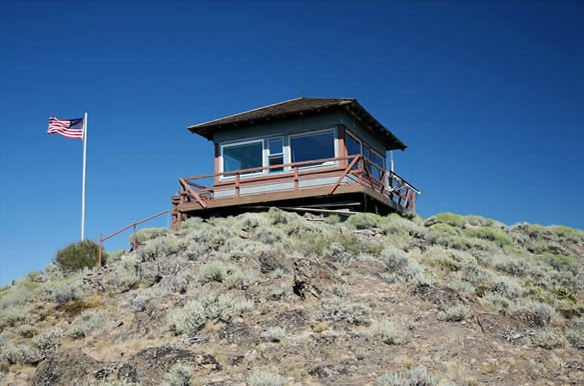
The Hager Mountain lookout was built in 1954.

Prior to European settlement, the Northern Paiute called the mountain pasiakwao, which means "bald eagle." Similarly, the Klamath people of south-central Oregon called the mountain Chock-chock-lisk-se, meaning "bald faced rock." Some early maps of the area show the mountain as Bald Mountain. However, early settlers called it Hagerhorst Mountain, after a pioneer rancher who lived just north of the mountain in the Silver Lake Valley. Over the years, the name was shortened to Hager.

The United States Forest Service built a fire lookout on Hager Mountain and began manning it full-time in 1915. The original lookout was replaced with a new structure in 1954. The current lookout is a 14 feet (4.3 m) by 14 feet (4.3 m) one-room cabin with large glass windows on all four sides. From it, the forest guard has a 360 degree view of the surrounding landscape. The Forest Service mans the lookout from June through October each year. There is a dirt road leading to the summit. The road is used only by the lookout on duty; it is not open to the public.

== Recreation ==
In the summer, recreation opportunities in the Hager Mountain area include hiking, horseback riding, mountain biking, bird watching, wildlife viewing, hunting, camping, and photography. In the winter, cross-country skiing and snowshoeing are the most popular activities on Hager Mountain. Weather conditions on the mountain can change rapidly, especially in the winter. As a result, visitors enjoying winter activities need to check weather forecasts before setting out on any of the Hager Mountain trails.

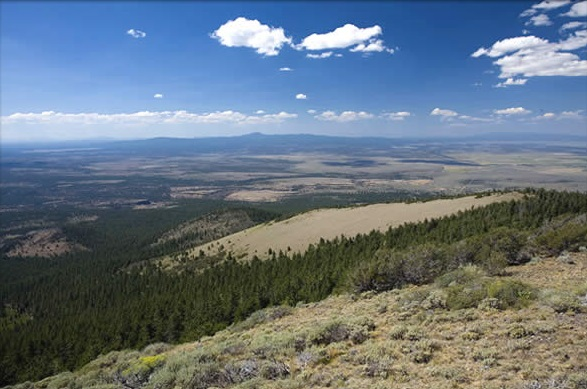
View from the summit of Hager Mountain

There are three day-hike trails that lead to the summit of Hager Mountain, in addition to the Fremont National Recreation Trail. The easiest trail is a 2-mile (3.2 km) roundtrip from the road gate on the west side of the mountain. It has an elevation gain of 785 feet (239 m) and is normally open from June through mid-November. The second trail is a little more challenging. The route covers 3.3 miles (5.3 km) each way. The trailhead is located on the northwest side of the mountain, just off Forest Road 012. This trail has an elevation gain of 1,710 feet (520 m). The longest trail is an 8-mile (12.9 km) roundtrip hike. The trailhead departs from Forest Road 28 near milepost 9 on the east side of the mountain. The elevation gain along this trail is 1,990 feet (610 m). The two longer trails merge about halfway to the summit and then link to the Fremont National Recreation Trail a short distance later. The Fremont trail leads to Fremont Point and Winter Rim, approximately 25 miles (40.2 km) southeast of the trail junction.

From the lookout station on the summit of Hager Mountain, visitors have an excellent view of Cascade peaks to the west as well as the high-desert country of northern Lake County to the north and east. Visitors can see as far north as Mount Hood and as far south as Mount Shasta from Hager's summit.

A Forest Service guard lives on-site at the Hager Mountain lookout during the summer wildfire season. However, the public is able to visit the lookout during this period. After the fire season is over, the lookout can be rented by the public for recreational purposes from November through May. The lookout has a wood stove for heating the building, along with a propane cooking stove and a propane refrigerator. There is a single bed and three sleeping cots. Outside, there is a picnic table and an outhouse with a vault-type toilet. There is no drinking water at the site.

== See also ==
- List of mountains of Oregon
