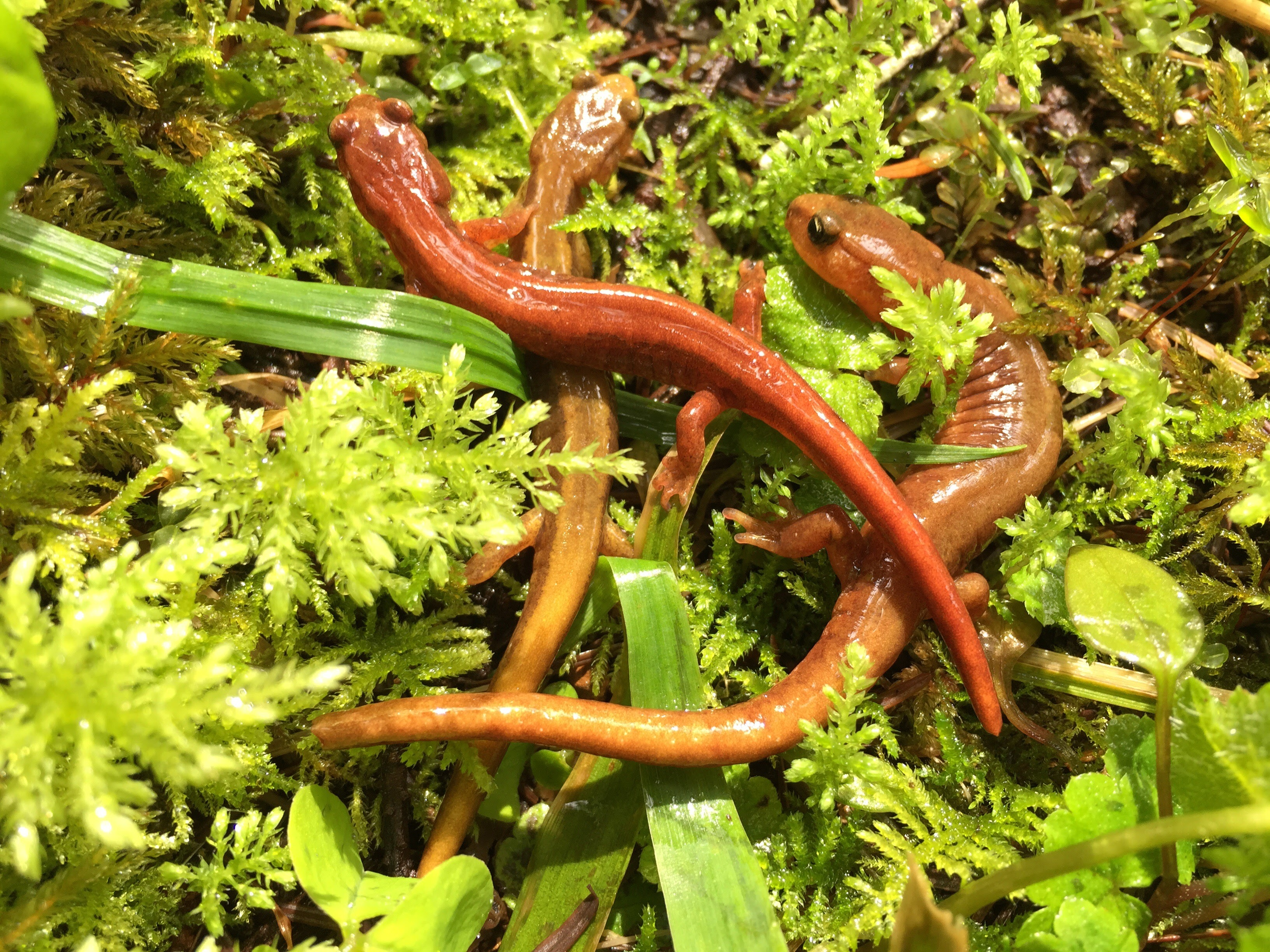
- Plethodon vandykei observed in Willapa Hills south of Pe Ell, Washington.

Conservation status
- Least Concern (IUCN 3.1)

Scientific classification
- Kingdom: Animalia
- Phylum: Chordata
- Class: Amphibia
- Order: Urodela
- Family: Plethodontidae
- Genus: Plethodon
- Species: P. vandykei

Binomial name
- Plethodon vandykei Van Denburgh, 1906

= Van Dyke's salamander =

Species of amphibian

Van Dyke's salamander (Plethodon vandykei) is a small woodland salamander in the family Plethodontidae, the lungless salamanders. These animals breathe through their skin and are largely terrestrial. Compared to other salamanders in Plethodon it is relatively stocky with long legs. Usually associated with streams, seepages, and rock outcrops, it is endemic to Washington where it is found in a limited number of small, isolated populations.

== Taxonomy ==
Van Dyke's salamander was first described by John Van Denburgh in 1906 from a specimen found in Mount Rainier National Park. The species was named in honor of its collector, Edwin Cooper Van Dyke. The Coeur d'Alene salamander (Plethodon idahoensis) and the Larch Mountain salamander (Plethodon larselli) are its two closest relatives in the region. At one time, all three were thought to be members of the same species until genetic studies concluded that they were distinct species.

== Description ==
Van Dyke's salamander has a relatively stocky body and grows up to 10 cm long. There are parotoid glands behind the eyes, and the feet are broad and slightly webbed. Different color phases are described based on body color, which can be black, yellow, or pink. The "dark phase" has a black ground color and yellow or red dorsal stripe. The stripe appears to have drops of color extending down the sides. The "light phase" is tan, yellow or rose with an indistinct stripe. Dark phase individuals have white speckling on the sides and a yellow throat. Multiple color phases can occur within the same population.

They are completely terrestrial but require high soil moisture and cool temperatures. They are most active in the spring after snow-melt and in the fall after the onset of the rainy season. They avoid the summer heat and the freezing temperatures of winter, seeking shelter beneath stones or within rotting logs. Courtship and egg laying occurs in the spring. Clutch size ranges from 7-14 eggs which measure about 4–5 mm in diameter. Females attend the eggs until hatching in the fall. There is no larval stage; hatchlings emerge as juvenile salamanders.

== Distribution and habitat ==
Van Dyke's salamander is endemic to the western portion of Washington. It occurs in three disjunct areas: on the Olympic Peninsula, in the Willapa Hills, and in the southern Cascade Range. They generally occur in small isolated populations that are usually associated with streams, seepages, and rock outcrops. Van Dyke's Salamander is absent from the eastern slopes of the Cascade Range and Olympic Range, suggesting this salamander's association with high rainfall regions. In coastal areas, it is mostly found in old forest stands that have moderate to high levels of woody debris and fractured rock present. Large decaying conifer logs along streams appear to be important habitat for nesting.

== Conservation ==
Threats to the Van Dyke's salamander are not well studied, but patchy distribution and low population densities would indicate that this species should receive conservation attention. Populations are at risk from logging, road construction, and other activities that could impact or degrade their specific habitat requirements. Surveys suggest that this species has limited ability to survive in disturbed habitat. It occurs in two protected areas, Mount St. Helens National Volcanic Monument and Olympic National Park.
