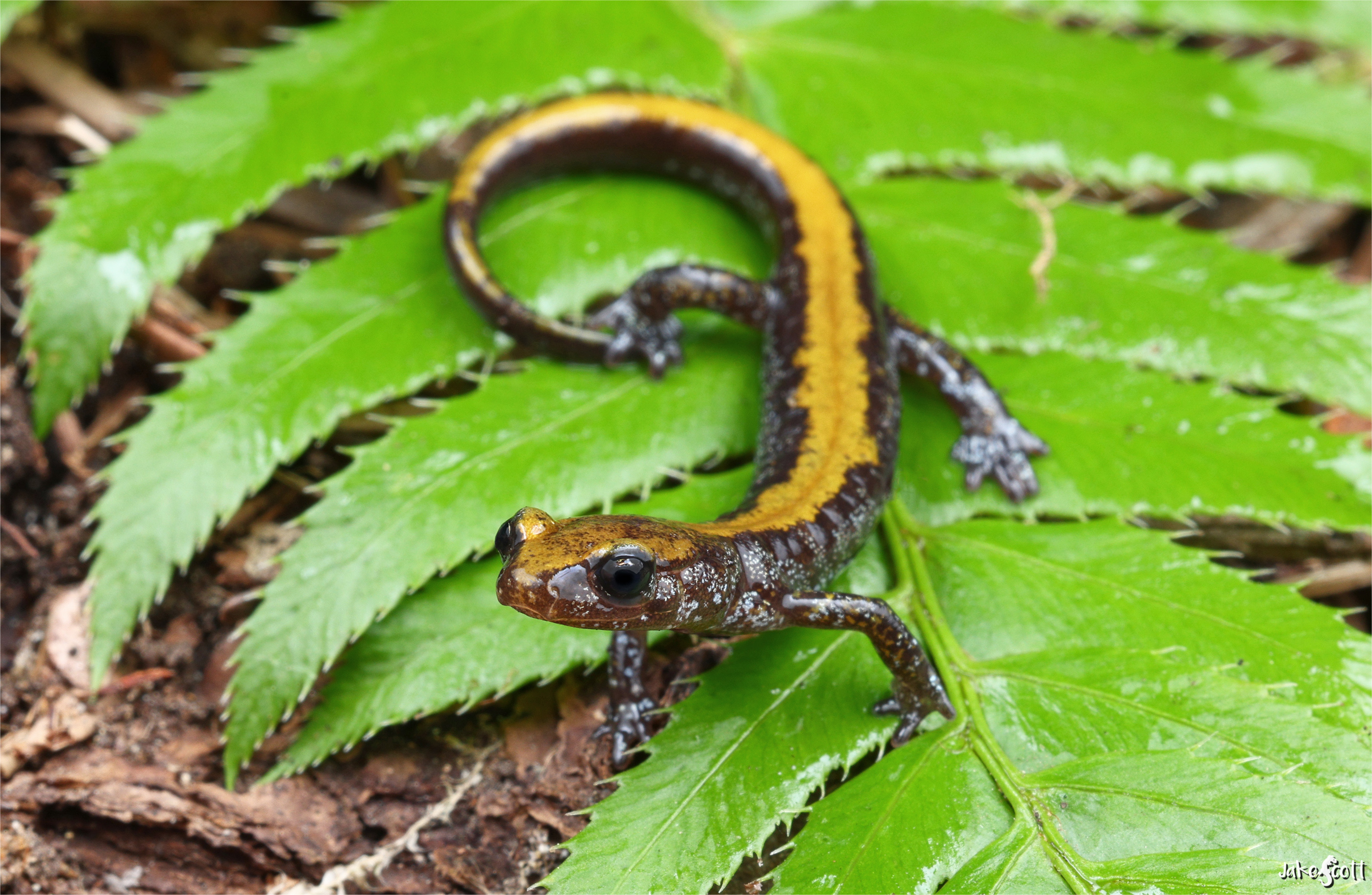

Conservation status
- Least Concern (IUCN 3.1)

Scientific classification
- Kingdom: Animalia
- Phylum: Chordata
- Class: Amphibia
- Order: Urodela
- Family: Plethodontidae
- Genus: Plethodon
- Species: P. idahoensis

Binomial name
- Plethodon idahoensis Slater & Slipp, 1940

Synonyms
- Plethodon vandykei idahoensis

= Coeur d'Alene salamander =

Species of amphibian

The Coeur d'Alene salamander (Plethodon idahoensis) is a species of woodland salamander (Plethodon) in the family of lungless salamanders (Plethodontidae) found in northern Idaho, western Montana, and southeastern British Columbia. This species was discovered in 1939 by James R. Slater and John W. Slipp on the south shore of Lake Coeur d'Alene in northern Idaho. It was once considered to be a subspecies of Van Dyke's salamander, as P. vandykei idahoensis, but appears to be a distinct and separate species as originally suggested by Slater and Slipp (1940).

== Description ==
P. idahoensis specimens are slender salamanders 2–4 in (51–102 mm) long. The adult has a nasolabial groove, parotoid glands, and parasphenoid teeth. Coloration and markings key to characterizing this species include a dark ground color with a yellow-gold dorsal stripe that extends the length of the organism, as well as ventral yellow patches on the throat. The toes of the Coeur d'Alene salamander are shorter than those of the long-toed salamander, which aids in distinguishing the two species.

The eggs of the Coeur d'Alene salamander have a unique appearance, as well. They are not pigmented and occur in grape-like clusters, attached by a single thread.

== Distribution ==
While the majority of this species is localized in northern Idaho, some instances of capture/sighting in western Montana and southeastern British Columbia have occurred. About 95% of observed populations in Idaho and Montana have been verified extant since 1987; the remainder may have [extirpated], but with a general lack of knowledge on the population trends of the Coeur d'Alene salamander.

The majority of known specimens has been observed in the St. Joe and North Fork Clearwater River basins, but they also occur in the Selway, Kootenai, and Moyie drainages.

=== Habitat ===
The preferred territory of P. idahoensis is in the corridors of stream riparian zones, in the splash zone of waterfalls, near seeps and springs, or in stream-side scree. Specimens are usually associated with fractured rock formations in moist environments, often localized around fresh, moving water.

== Lifestyle ==
Generally, these salamanders only come above ground during the night when the temperature is above 45 °F. Coeur d'Alene salamanders are known to eat aquatic insects and other invertebrates, which are also active at night.

In northern Idaho, P. idahoensis emerges from winter hibernation in late March and is active near the surface through April and May; this surface activity is negatively correlated with both high daytime temperatures and the number of days since last rain. From June until mid-September, Coeur d'Alene salamanders retreat underground to aestivate. A second period of activity continues with September through early November rains, followed by a period of hibernation that lasts until spring.

=== Reproduction ===
Clutch size varies from a small cluster (about four) to 13.

== Management issues ==
Due to lack of research and rarity of sightings/capture, population trend data for the Coeur d'Alene salamander are spotty at best. Small sites are thought to exist where the species is abundant and capable of observation, but without an implemented monitoring program, few data are available with which to evaluate population trends. This lack of information puts the Coeur d'Alene salamander on both Idaho and Montana's Species of Special Concern lists.

=== Conservation classifications ===
System	Status
Rangewide	G4 Apparently secure
Statewide	S2 Imperiled
ESA	No status
US Forest Service	Region 1: Sensitive
Bureau of Land Management	Type 3 Regional/State imperiled
Idaho Department of Fish and Game	Protected nongame
