= Goose Lake National Forest =

Former national forest in Oregon

Coordinates: 44.357°N 85.242°W

Goose Lake National Forest was established as the Goose Lake Forest Reserve by the U.S. Forest Service in Oregon on August 21, 1906 with 630,000 acres (2,500 km^{2}). It became a National Forest on March 4, 1907. On July 1, 1908 the entire forest was added to Fremont National Forest and the name was discontinued.
