= Williamson River (Oregon) =

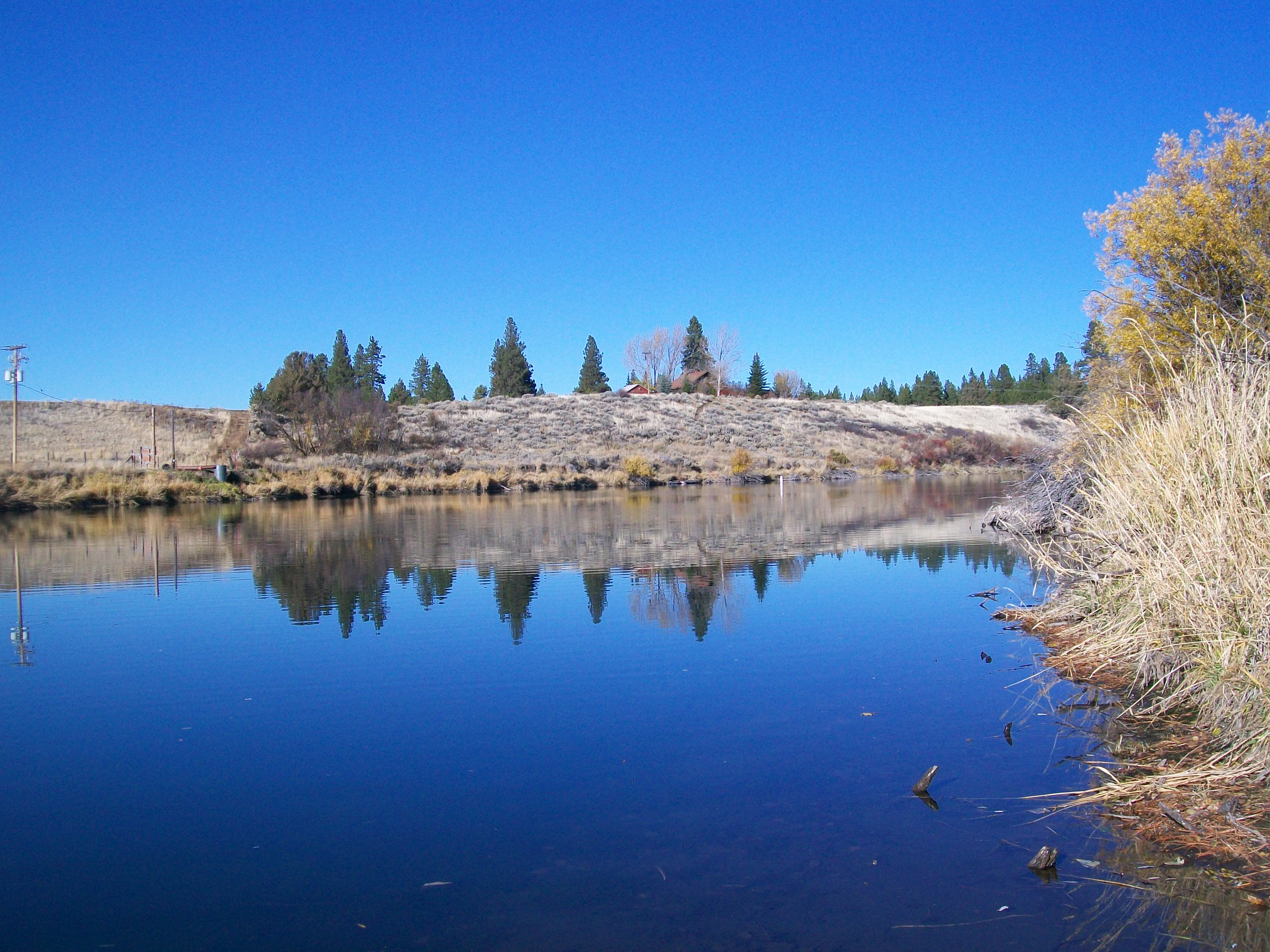
- Upstream view within the Williamson River Indian Mission in Chiloquin

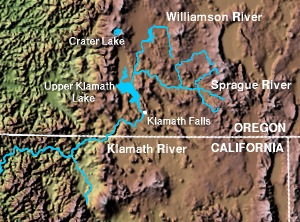
- The Williamson, Sprague, and Klamath rivers

- Location of the mouth of Williamson River in Oregon
- Etymology: Robert S. Williamson, who conducted Pacific Railroad Surveys in central Oregon

Location
- Country: United States
- State: Oregon
- County: Klamath

Physical characteristics
- Source: near Bottle Spring
  - location: Winema National Forest
  - coordinates: 42°42′15″N 121°20′24″W
  - elevation: 5,100 ft (1,600 m)
- Mouth: Upper Klamath Lake
  - location: near Modoc Point
  - coordinates: 42°27′53″N 121°57′25″W
  - elevation: 4,147 ft (1,264 m)
- Length: 100 mi (160 km)
- Basin size: 3,000 sq mi (7,800 km^{2})
- Discharge
  - location: near Chiloquin, 10.3 miles (16.6 km) from the mouth
  - average: 1,032 cu ft/s (29.2 m^{3}/s)
  - minimum: 285 cu ft/s (8.1 m^{3}/s)
  - maximum: 17,100 cu ft/s (480 m^{3}/s)

The Williamson River of south-central Oregon in the United States is about 100 miles (160 km) long. It drains about 3,000 square miles (7,800 km^{2}) east of the Cascade Range. Together with its principal tributary, the Sprague River, it provides over half the inflow to Upper Klamath Lake, the largest freshwater lake in Oregon. The lake's outlet is the Link River, which flows into Lake Ewauna and the Klamath River.

== Course ==
The Williamson rises from a large spring in central Klamath County, on the north side of Fuego Mountain, in the Winema National Forest, about 40 miles (64 km) northeast of Klamath Falls. A portion of the Williamson River is nicknamed Root Beer Falls "because the water is laden with nutrients carried from the Klamath Marsh a few miles upstream" and "Foam that builds up at the base of the falls gives the appearance of a root beer float". ). It flows in a large arc north through the mountains, then west, then southwest through Klamath Marsh and the Klamath Marsh National Wildlife Refuge. Downstream of the refuge, the river flows roughly parallel to U.S. Route 97, receiving Spring Creek from the right at Collier Memorial State Park, about 5 miles (8.0 km) north of Chiloquin. At Chiloquin, it receives the Sprague River from the left at about river mile (RM) 11 (river kilometer (RK) 18). The Williamson enters the northern end of Upper Klamath Lake near Modoc Point, about 20 miles (32 km) northwest of Klamath Falls.

== Watershed ==
At lower elevations along big streams, the Williamson watershed supports irrigated pastures and other farmlands. Livestock grazing occurs in many locations in the basin. Forests, often cut for timber, cover about 81 percent of the basin and farms account for 6 percent, while range, wetlands, water, and urban areas cover a combined 13 percent. Precipitation in the basin, which lies in the rain shadow of the Cascade Range, averages 23 inches (580 mm) a year along the Williamson above its confluence with the Sprague and about 20 inches (510 mm) along the Sprague.

== Recreation ==
The Williamson is known for especially large wild Great Basin redband trout, which move into the river to spawn and to escape Upper Klamath Lake when it gets warm. Three-year-old fish "commonly reach 20 inches (51 cm) or better." Smaller numbers of brown trout also thrive in the Williamson, especially below Spring Creek. Lost River suckers also populate the river but are protected and cannot be caught and kept legally. Smaller rainbow trout and brook trout live in the river above Klamath Marsh. Much of the land along the river is privately owned, and public access is limited.

== History ==
Since 2003, The Nature Conservancy and other organizations have been working to restore about 12 square miles (31 km^{2}) of wetlands in the Williamson River delta at the north end of Upper Klamath Lake. Formerly diked and drained for farming, the delta provides habitat for millions of migrating birds as well as many native species of fish, mollusks, and aquatic plants.

In early Pleistocene times, the Klamath Marsh and Upper Klamath lake were much larger; and were maintained as shallow lakes and marshes by the continued subsidence of the basin in the face of abundant sedimentation and uplift along the eastern fault scarp. The eruption of Mount Mazama about 7,700 years ago contributed an enormous amount of sediment to the lake and marsh basins, and filled the canyon of the Williamson River.

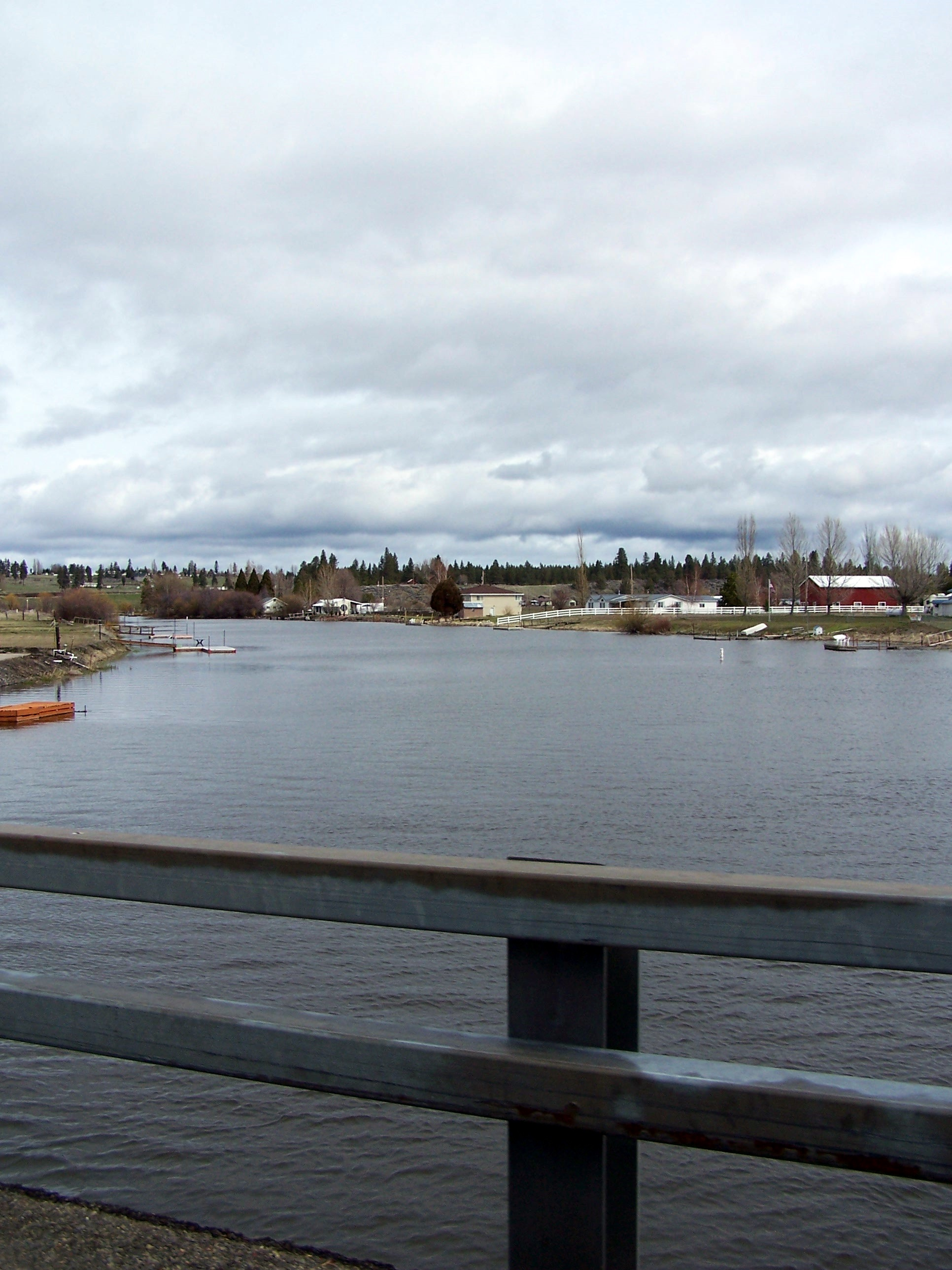
The Williamson River southwest of Chiloquin

== See also ==
- List of longest streams of Oregon
