= Paulina National Forest =

Historical national forest in United States

Coordinates: 43.7026°N 121.2818°W

Paulina National Forest was established by the U.S. Forest Service in Oregon on July 1, 1911, with 1,333,360 acres (5,395.9 km^{2}) from portions of Cascade, Crater, Deschutes, Fremont and Umpqua National Forests . On July 19, 1915, portions of Paulina were transferred back to Crater, Deschutes and Fremont, and the remainder was eliminated. They are now part of Rogue River-Siskiyou National Forest, Fremont-Winema National Forest and Deschutes National Forest.
