= Modoc Point, Oregon =

Unincorporated community in the state of Oregon, United States

Coordinates: 42°26′41″N 121°52′06″W

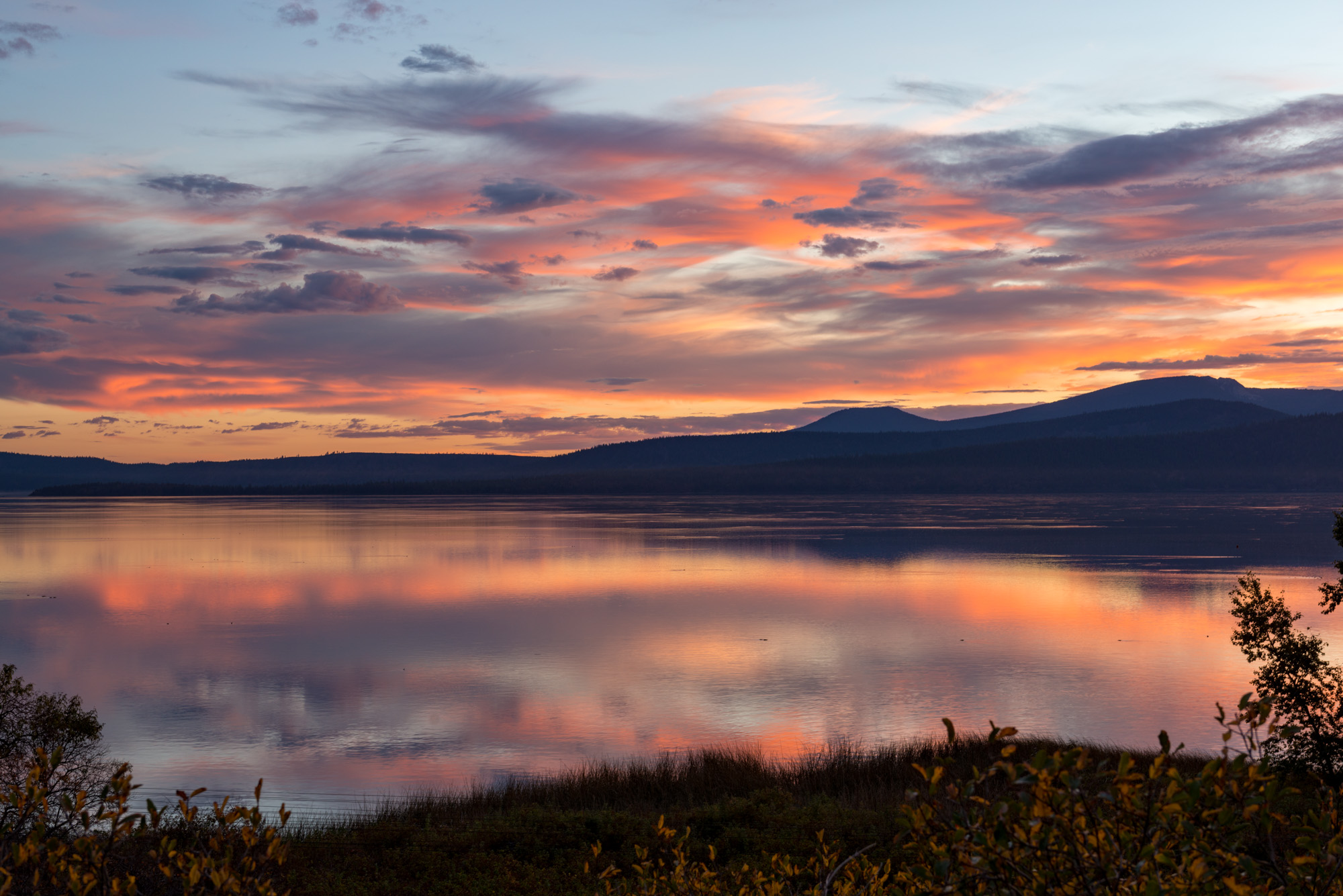
Upper Klamath Lake, Modoc Point, Highway 97

Modoc Point is an unincorporated community in Klamath County, Oregon, United States. The community is located on U.S. Route 97 on the shore of Upper Klamath Lake.

The post office takes its name from Modoc Point, a prominent point on Upper Klamath Lake just south of the community.

Modoc Point post office was established in 1916. Earlier, in 1911, the Southern Pacific Railroad established a station named "Lelu" at this point, and the name was changed to Modoc Point in 1916 to match the post office. Chief Lelu was one of the signatories of the Treaty with the Klamath, etc. on October 14, 1864. "Lelu" was a corruption of the French le loup for "gray wolf".
