= Yamsay Mountain =

Shield volcano mountain in Oregon, U.S.

- paba katɨdɨ (Northern Paiute)
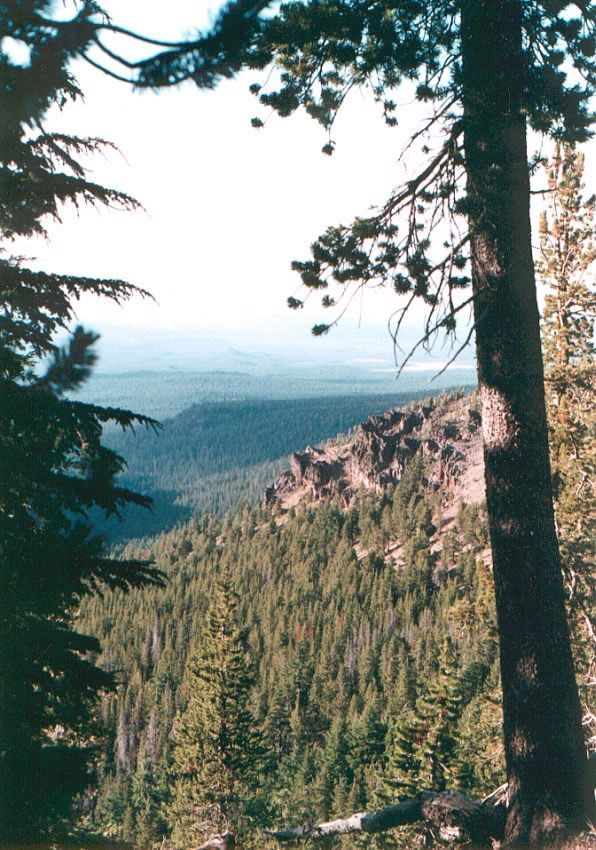
- View from Yamsay Mountain

Highest point
- Elevation: 8,200 ft (2,499 m) NAVD 88
- Prominence: 3,176 ft (968 m)
- Coordinates: 42°55′50″N 121°21′39″W

Geography
- Location: Klamath County, Oregon, U.S.
- Parent range: Cascade Range
- Topo map: USGS Yamsay Mountain

Geology
- Mountain type: Shield volcano

Climbing
- Easiest route: Trail (formerly a road)

Yamsay Mountain (Northern Paiute: paba katɨdɨ) is a large shield volcano in the Cascade Range of south-central Oregon, located about 35 miles (56 km) east of Crater Lake on the border between Klamath County and Lake County. It is part of the Cascade Volcanic Arc but is located in a mountain range 30 to 50 miles (50 to 80 km) behind the main Cascade volcanic front. The best known members of this enigmatic arc are the massive shields of Newberry Volcano, about 55 miles (89 km) farther north in Oregon, and Medicine Lake Volcano, about 80 miles (130 km) south in Northern California. Yamsay is the second highest volcano in the eastern arc, almost 300 feet (90 m) higher than Newberry and Medicine Lake.

A central part of Klamath mythology, the mountain offers activities such as hiking and horseback riding. Historically, the area around it has been inhabited by Native American tribes and settlers. Until the 1970s, a fire lookout tower sat on the summit of the mountain, and its foundation remains to this day.

== Geography and geology ==
Diagram; plate tectonics of the Cascade Range

Like other volcanoes in the Cascade Range, Yamsay was produced by subduction of the oceanic Juan de Fuca Plate under the North American Plate. Annual convergence between the two continues at a rate of 1.6 inches (4 cm) per year. The Cascades make up the majority of the North American West Coast volcanoes; they have been volcanically active for about 36 million years. The rock making up the Cascades is slightly older, dated between 55 and 42 million years old. In an attempt to organize the volcanoes by age, scientists typically divide them into two provinces: the High Cascades – the younger volcanoes – and the Western Cascades, comprising the older volcanoes.

Yamsay, along with the Simcoe volcanic complex, Medicine Lake Highlands, and Newberry Volcano, make up a wayward range of shield volcanoes between 50 kilometres (31 mi) and 60 kilometres (37 mi) east of the main Cascade Range. Volcanism at these centers is unlike other eruptions in the Cascades, and it does not stem from fissures as would Basin and Range volcanism. The volcanoes appear to be isolated from the major volcanic ranges in the Northwestern United States, although scientists group them as part of the Cascades.

Recent volcanism in the Cascades, lasting from 7 to 2 mya, produced largely basaltic and basaltic andesite-based material (up to 50 percent). On the eastern side of the High Cascades, however, volcanoes erupted dacite, andesite, and rhyolite. These materials made up several types of eruptions: lava flows, domes, and pyroclastic flows. In the most recent volcanic activity, andesite, basalt, and rhyolite have been erupted from High Cascades volcanoes, particularly the Three Sisters, Broken Top, Mount Hood, Mount Jefferson, and Crater Lake.

== History ==
The name Yamsay is a corruption of the Klamath (a Native American tribe of Southern Oregon) name Yamsi, a form of Yamash, meaning "north wind." This mountain was supposed to be the home of Kmukamtch, the supreme being of Klamath mythology. Historically, the area by the mountain was inhabited by Klamath, Modoc, and Yahooskin Bands, all of the Snake Paiute people. The Yahooskins lived east of Yamsay Mountain, near modern-day Lakeview. Their group inhabited 22 million acres (89,000 km^{2}) of land in Oregon and California. The Yahooskins called the mountain paba katɨdɨ, which means "big sitter." Traders entered the area at some point between 1825 and 1827, where they worked as trappers for the Hudson's Bay Company. After routes opened up in 1846, Fort Klamath was built (in 1863).

The city of Klamath Falls (southwest of Yamsay) sprang up in the 1920s and featured the fastest-growing population in Oregon. Contributors to this new growth and development included the creation of the Southern Pacific Railroad, completed in 1909. This opened the area for logging and timber business, which became the focus of the profit of the area.

The mountain features a United States Forest Service fire lookout tower with an 80-foot (24 m) steel tower, built on the summit of Yamsay in 1929. It was removed after the 1970s, and only remnants of the foundation remain today. A dirt road was built to the summit to service the lookout, but this was abandoned after the tower was removed. The upper 3.5 miles (5.6 km) now form a hiking trail to the summit.

== Climate and ecology ==
The Cascade Range is dramatically different in climate from west to east. The west side is heavily forested and features trees such as Douglas firs, western hemlock, Pacific silver firs, and Alaska yellow cedars. East of the Cascades, where Yamsay lies, the climate becomes much drier, even arid. Precipitation significantly declines and vegetation becomes more sparse, with lodgepole pine, white fir, ponderosa pine, and juniper. To the south, chaparral plants such as beargrass and bitterbrush prevail.

Diverse life exists within the range, including endangered species like Larch Mountain Salamanders and spotted owls. Amphibians like salamanders and frogs are common, as are birds. Mammals in the area consist of elk, mountain lions, deer, and black bears. Eastern Cascades fish include Lost River suckers and short suckers, which are both endemic species.

== Recreation ==
The Fremont National Recreation Trail passes through the area. It offers tourists views of other Oregon Cascades landmarks, such as Mount Bachelor, Mount Shasta, Three Sisters, and Mount Thielson. Other activities along the trail include hiking and horseback riding up the mountain from the recreation area located at an elevation between 6,500 feet (1,981 m) and 8,196 feet (2,498 m).
