= Modoc Point =

Lakeside cliff in Oregon, US

Coordinates: 42.439027°N 121.858622°W

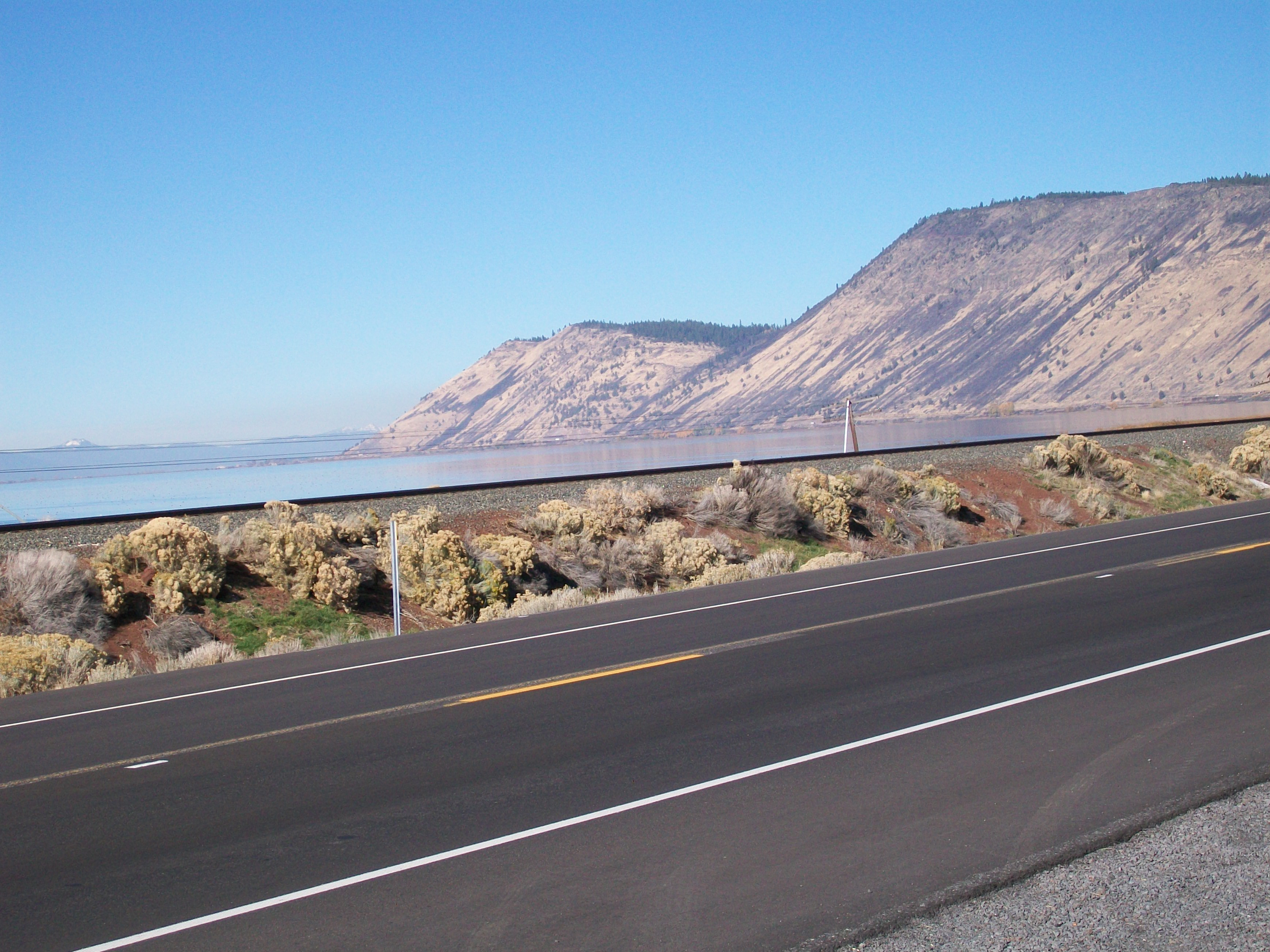
Modoc Ridge and the Upper Klamath Lake with U.S. Route 97 running between them.

Modoc Point is a cliff on the east shore of Upper Klamath Lake, in Klamath County, Oregon, United States, approximately 15 miles north of Klamath Falls on U.S. Route 97. It is part of the larger cliff known as Modoc Rim or Modoc Ridge.

The point is named for the Modoc tribe of Native Americans because it was assigned to them when they moved on to the Klamath Reservation, following a treaty in 1864. This area was then part of the reservation. Captain Jack and his band lived in this area from December 31, 1869, to April 26, 1870. Due to continued harassment by the Klamath, the Modoc left the reservation to return to their traditional territory to the south on the Lost River in present-day California. This was before the Modoc War (1872–1873).

Klamath folklore frequently features this location; they called it Kiuti or Muyant. It was also called Nilakla, meaning 'dawn' or 'sunrise'. William G. Steel stated that the point was known as Nilakla, the Klamath word for 'dawn' or 'sunrise'.

Modoc Point was the namesake for a railroad station and post office just north of the point.
