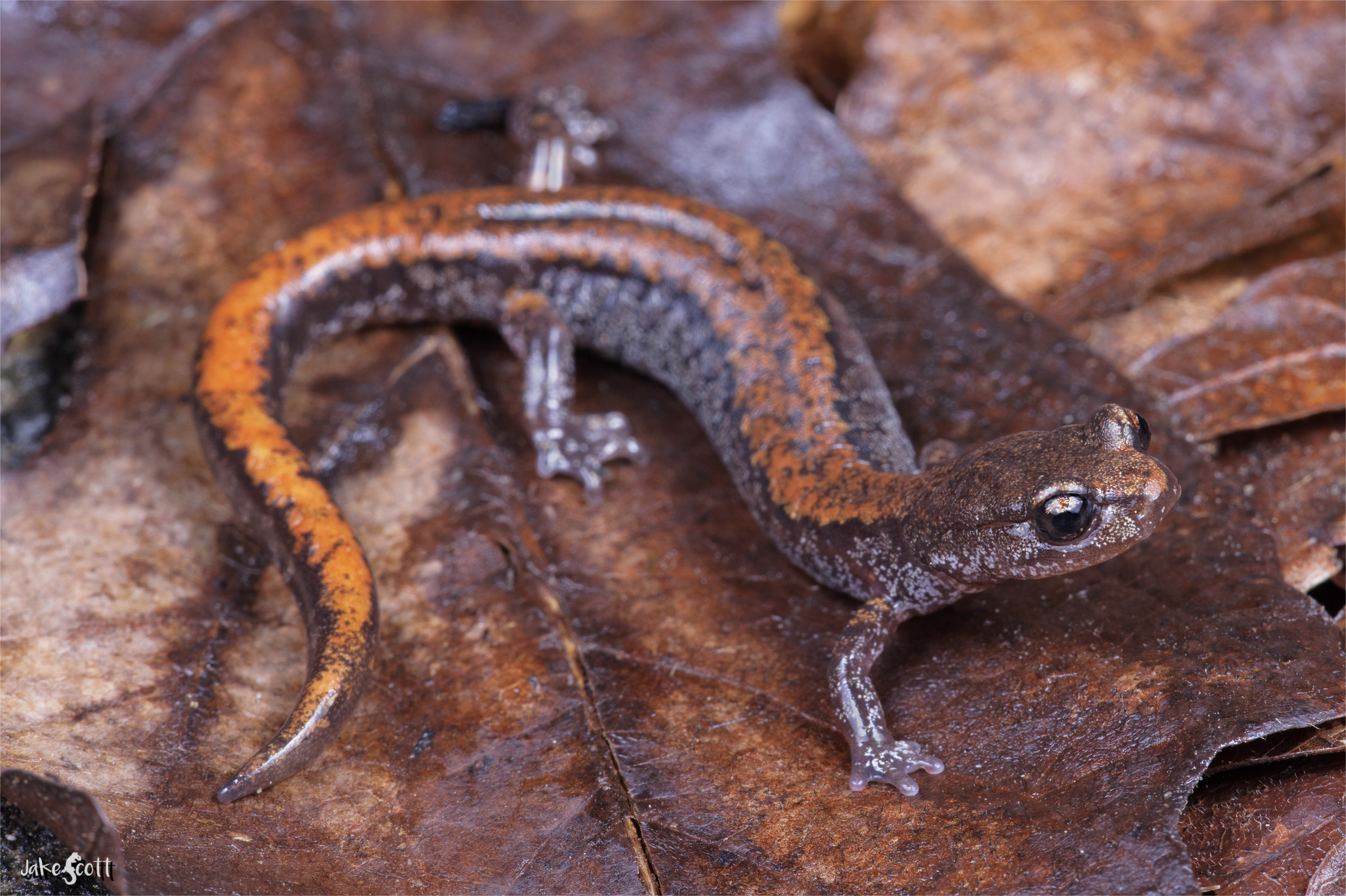

Conservation status
- Least Concern (IUCN 3.1)

Scientific classification
- Kingdom: Animalia
- Phylum: Chordata
- Class: Amphibia
- Order: Urodela
- Family: Plethodontidae
- Genus: Plethodon
- Species: P. larselli

Binomial name
- Plethodon larselli Burns, 1954

= Larch Mountain salamander =

Species of amphibian

The Larch Mountain salamander (Plethodon larselli) is a species of salamander in the family Plethodontidae endemic to the United States. It occurs in the Cascade Mountains of southern Washington and northern Oregon. In Washington, it occurs from the Columbia River Gorge to just north of Snoqualmie Pass. Its natural habitats are temperate forests and rocky areas. It is threatened by habitat loss.

== Taxonomy ==
The Larch Mountain salamander was originally described as a species by D.M. Burns in 1962. Originally considered a subspecies of Van Dyke's salamander, the Larch Mountain salamander's closest genetic relative is the Jemez Mountains salamander, endemic to New Mexico.

== Description ==
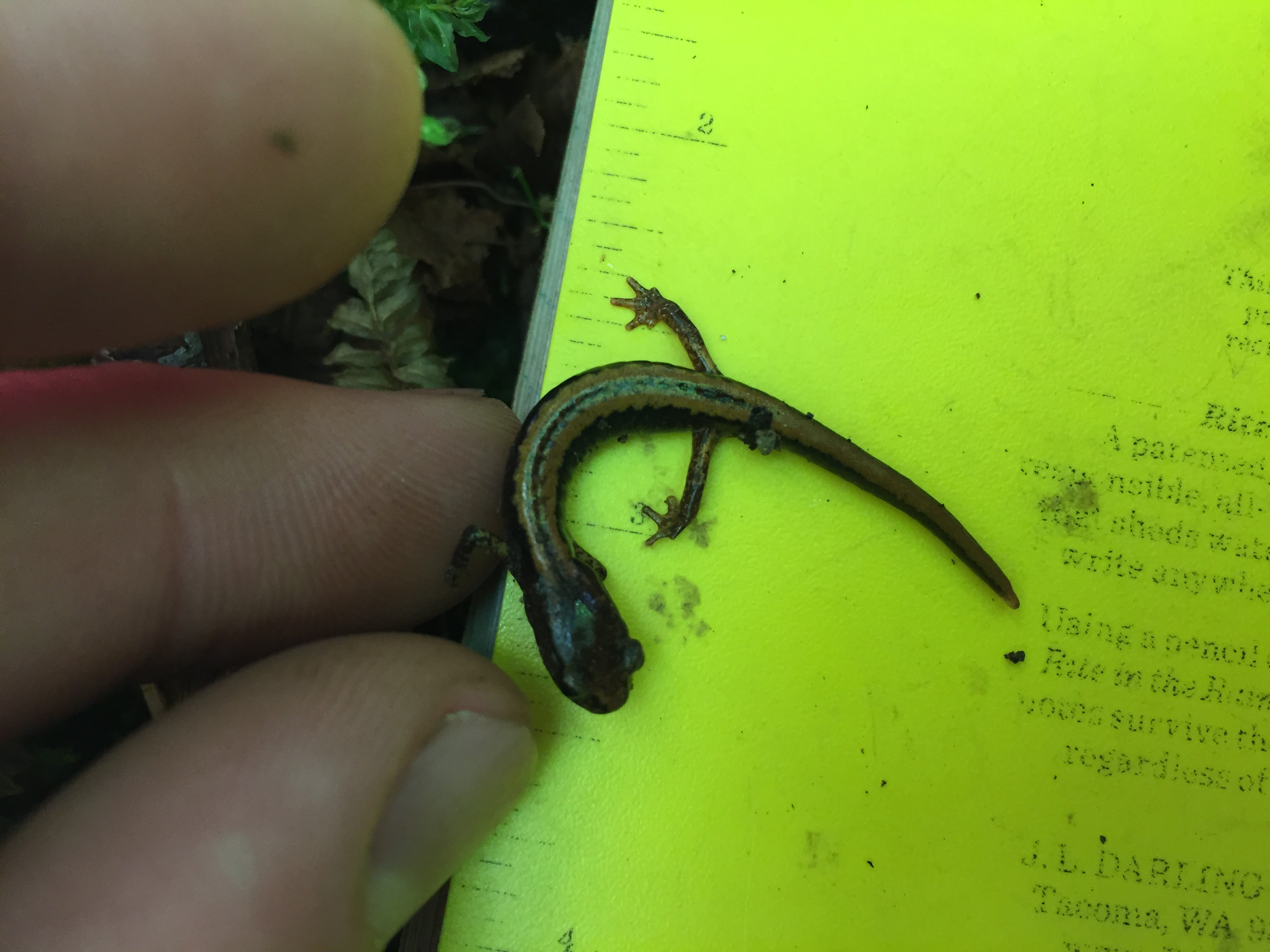
A juvenile P. larselli

The Larch Mountain salamander is a small, terrestrial salamander. The species is characterized by a variable dorsal stripe, typically orange, light brown, or yellow, which is often blotchy. The ground color is brown, with light speckling in certain areas. This species is easily distinguishable from other western Plethodon by its reddish-salmonish venter. Adults are typically just smaller than 2 inches in snout-to-vent length, with a mode of 15 costal grooves.
