= San Marcos Springs =

Spring in Texas, United States

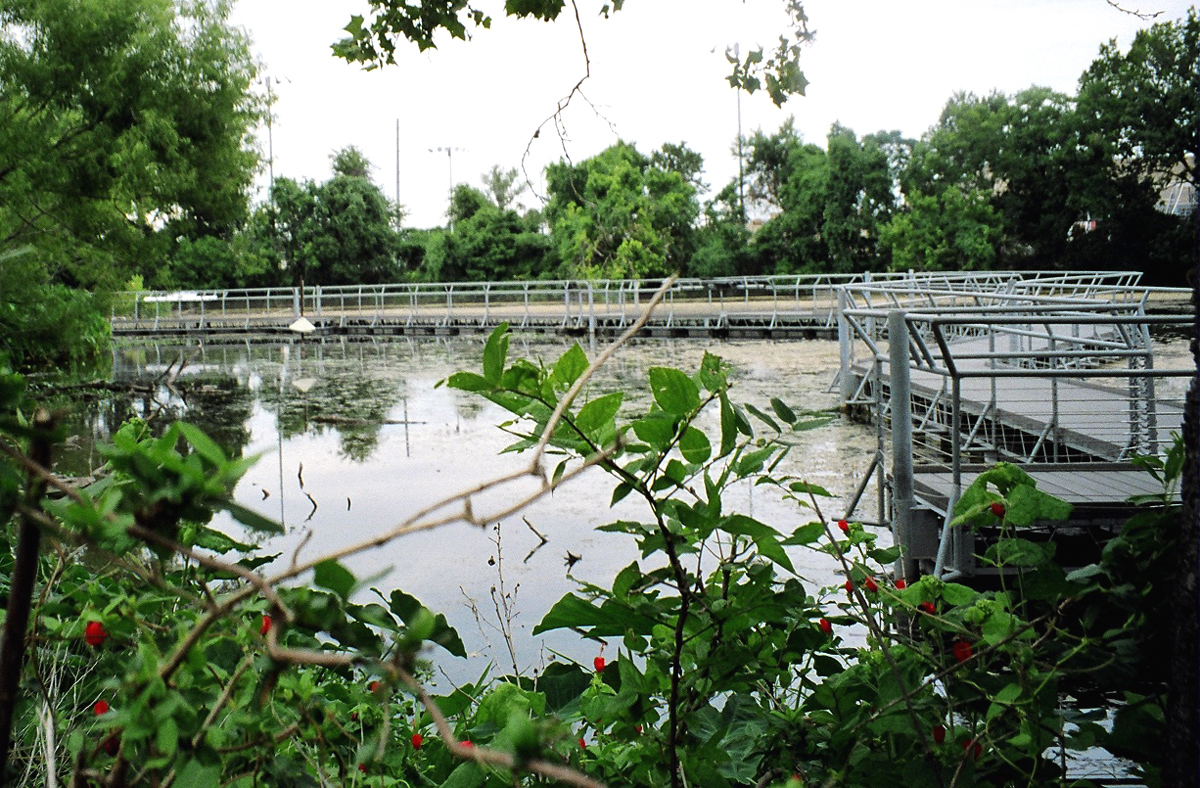
- The Wetlands Boardwalk encircles Spring Lake at San Marcos Springs
- Interactive map of San Marcos Springs
- Location: San Marcos, Texas, U.S.A.
- Coordinates: 29°53′35″N 97°55′53″W
- Spring source: Edwards Aquifer
- Elevation: 570 ft (170 m)
- Type: Karst spring
- Provides water for: San Marcos River
- Magnitude: 1
- Discharge: 152 ft³/s (4300 L/s)

San Marcos Springs is the second largest natural cluster of springs in Texas. The springs are located in the city of San Marcos, Texas, about 30 miles (48 km) southwest of Austin and 46 miles (74 km) northeast of San Antonio.

Although Spring Lake is highly protected, it is accessible to visitors through the Meadows Center for Water and the Environment, a program of Texas State University, which offers glass-bottom boat tours among other opportunities to explore and learn about the ecosystem.

== Geology ==
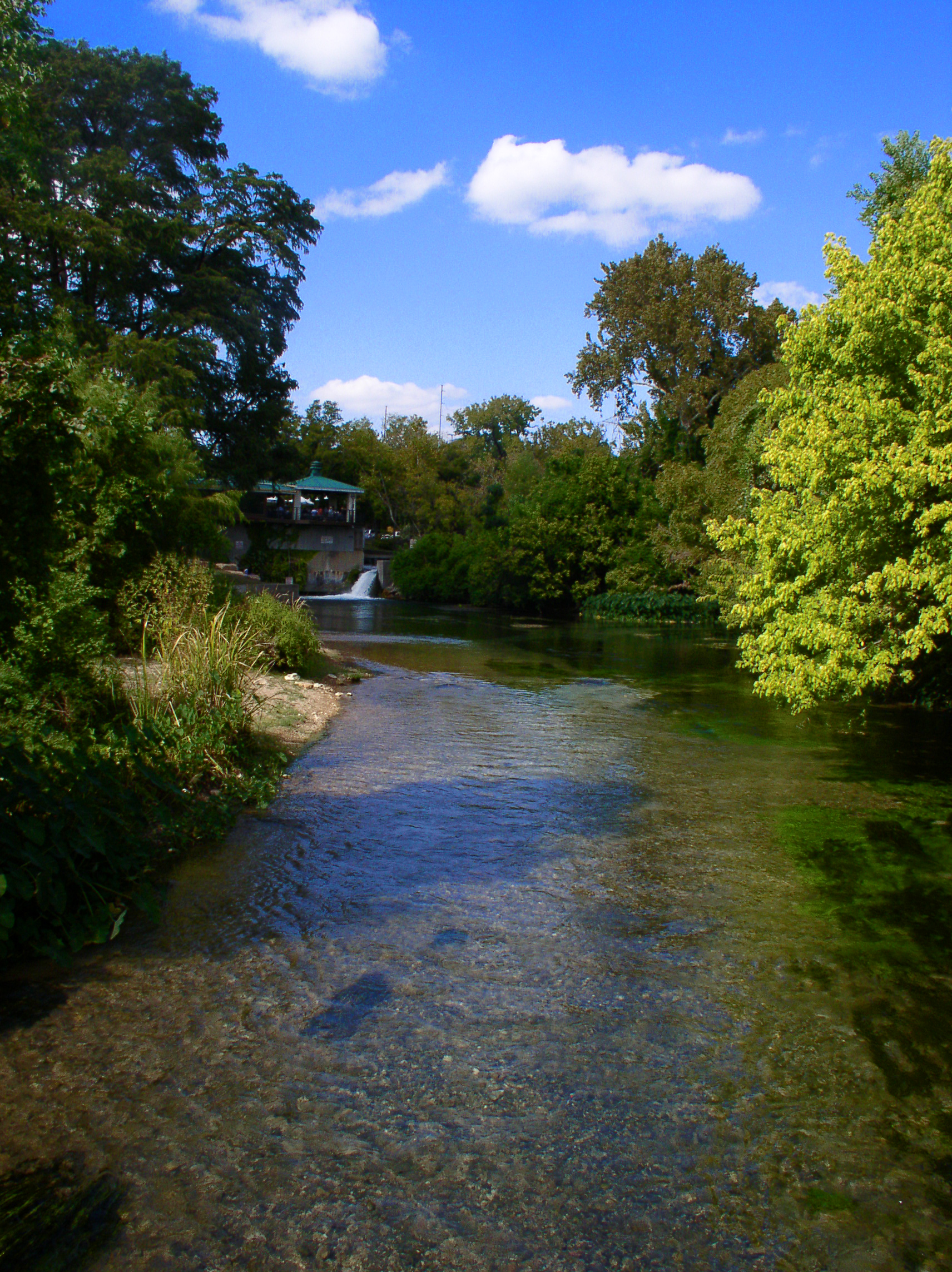
Downstream from the headwaters of the San Marcos Springs, Aquarena Springs, and Spring Lake.

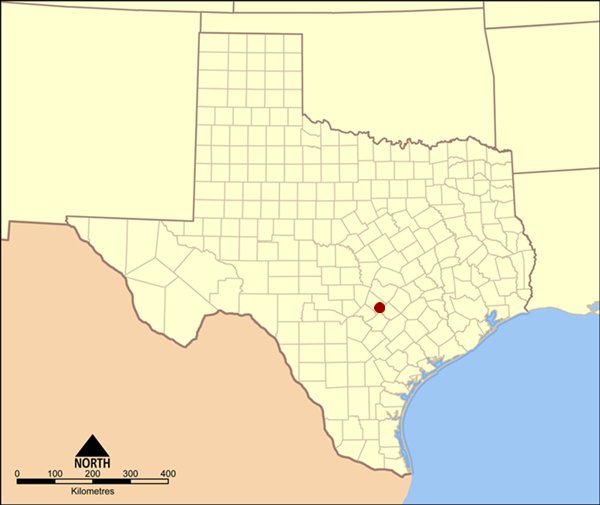
Location of the San Marcos Springs

The San Marcos Springs is an area of artesian outflow from the Edwards Aquifer along the Balcones Escarpment. More than 200 springs flow from three large fissures and other smaller openings in the rock. The springs provide most of the water for the San Marcos River, which flows southward from the springs' location.

The springs have never been known to stop flowing. The average flow is 152 ft³/s (4,300 liters/s); the lowest recorded flow of 46 ft³/s (1,302 L/s) occurred in 1956.

In 1849, former Republic of Texas vice president Edward Burleson built a dam just downstream from the springs; the resulting lake, known as Spring Lake, inundated the springs.

== History ==
Archaeologists believe that the San Marcos Springs area may be the oldest continually inhabited site in North America, with sediment core evidence of human activity dating back approximately 11,500 years. Excavations at this location uncovered Paleo Indian artifacts dating back as much as 19,000 years. The Coahuiltecan refer to these springs as their origin, and called them "Ajehuac Yana" ("spirit spring"). The Tonkawa called the springs Canocanayesatetlo ("warm water"), a reference to the springs' relatively warm 72 °F (22 °C) year-round temperature.

The first Europeans to see the springs were probably members of the Espinosa-Olivares-Aguirre expedition of 1709. Later, the Spanish mission San Xavier and the failed settlement of San Marcos de Neve were situated there. White Americans began settling the area in 1835, and the springs became a major stop on the Chisholm Trail. From 1928 until 1996, a resort and amusement park known as Aquarena Springs was located at the site. Texas State University-San Marcos purchased the surrounding area in 1994, and the site is now known as The Meadows Center for Water and the Environment.

== Flora and fauna ==
This region is a dividing line for certain species' occurrences. For example, the iconic California Fan Palm, Washingtonia filifera is found only west of the Balcones Fault, which runs through San Marcos Springs.

San Marcos Springs is home to eight threatened or endangered species: the Fountain darter, the Texas Blind Salamander, the San Marcos Salamander, the San Marcos Gambusia, Texas Wild Rice, the Comal Springs Dryopid Beetle, the Comal Springs Riffle Beetle, and the Peck's Cave Amphipod. Federal requirements to protect the species' environment, and the resulting demands those requirements place on water from the Edwards Aquifer, have led to several legal and political battles throughout the region.

Pursuant to the Edwards Aquifer Habitat Restoration Plan, researchers and volunteers operating out of the Texas State University Meadows Center for Water and the Environment remove non-native species of aquatic vegetation and re-plant native species such as Texas wild rice, resulting in a 53% increase in Texas wild rice since 2015.
