= Meadows Center for Water and the Environment =

Educational center in San Marcos, Texas, U.S.

Coordinates: 29.89304°N 97.93128°W

The Meadows Center for Water and the Environment
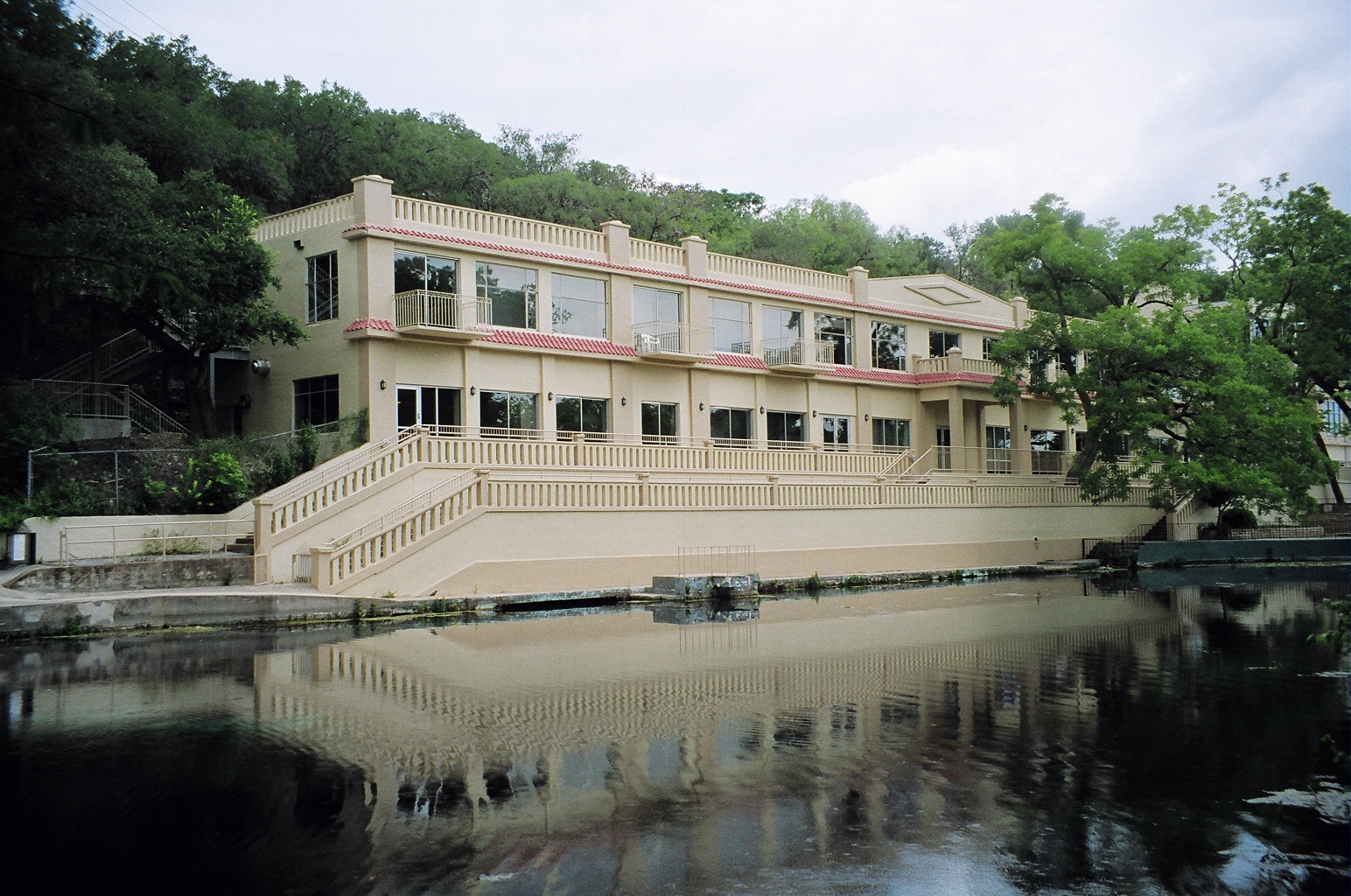
- This converted hotel is now home to the Meadows Center For Water And The Environment
- Legal status: Nonprofit
- Purpose: Study, preservation, and presentation of freshwater ecology
- Headquarters: San Marcos, Texas, United States
- Executive Director: Robert E. Mace
- Website: www.meadowscenter.txstate.edu/

The Meadows Center for Water and the Environment, formerly Aquarena Springs and later the Aquarena Center, is an educational center in San Marcos, Texas. It seeks to preserve the unique archaeological and biological resources of Spring Lake.

Formed from more than 200 artesian springs, Spring Lake is one of the world's largest aquifer fed systems. A state antiquities landmark, this site is also believed to be one of the longest continuously inhabited places in North America.

The Meadows Center provides educational programs, recreation, hands-on activities and collaborative projects that encourage visitors, scientists and students to learn about Spring Lake's habitat, endangered species and water/environmental resource management issues.

There are glass-bottom boat rides, and the Discovery Center provides educational displays allowing people to view native animals and fish. Snorkeling and diving programs are offered with an educational emphasis and interpreter led field trips.

The Meadows Center develops programs and techniques for ensuring sustainable water, economic resources as well as ecosystem health. The center is used by Texas State University, and its multidisciplinary departments are involved with water resource management studies and research.

The Meadows Center at Spring Lake Hall houses the Texas Stream Team, a volunteer program that monitors the water quality of freshwater systems throughout the state.

The center was established in 1994 when Texas State, formerly Southwest Texas University, purchased land that was previously used as an amusement park, including Spring Lake, then an artificial freshwater reservoir.

== History ==
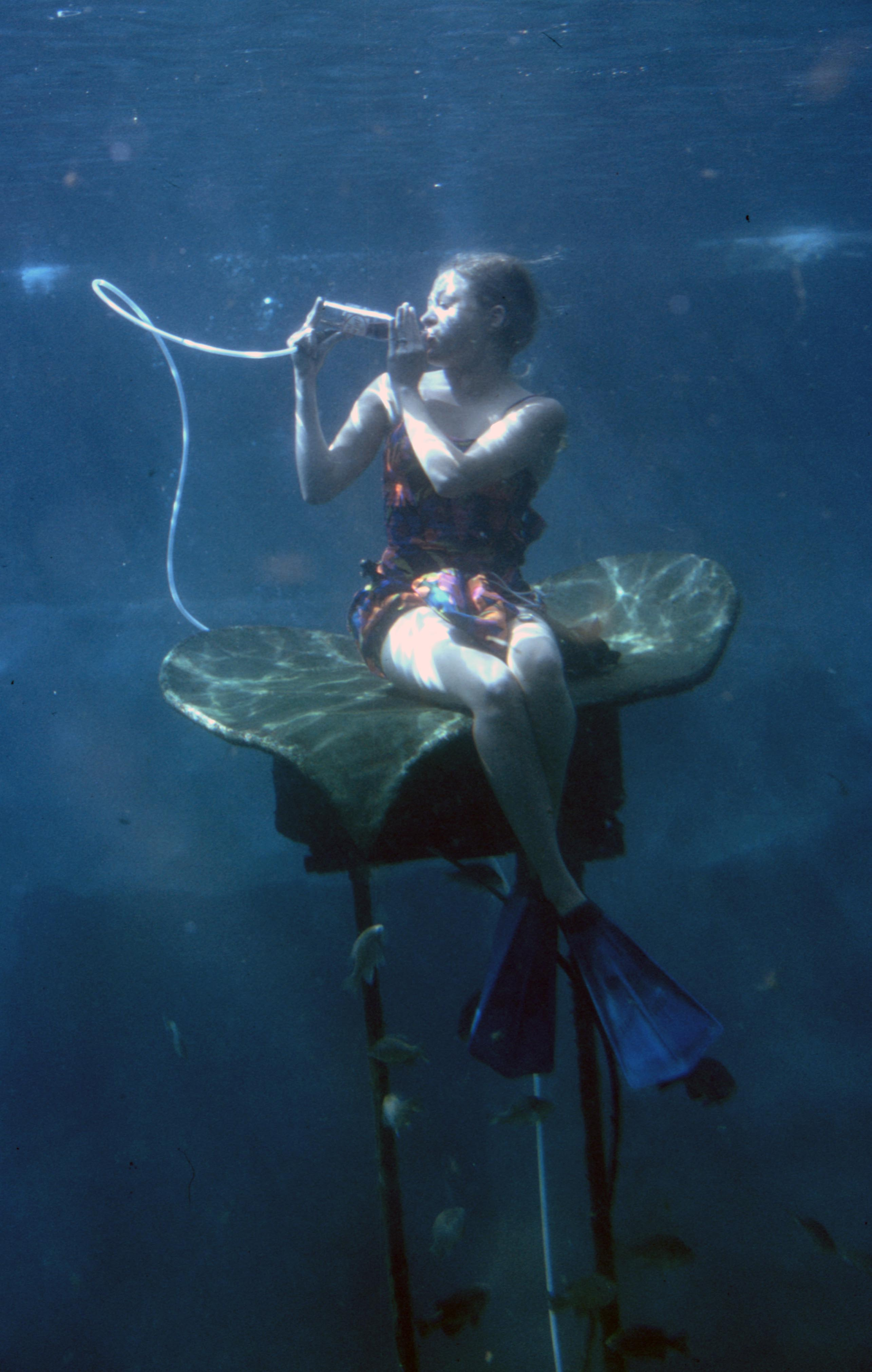
A mermaid prepares for a show.

=== Natural habitat ===
The San Marcos Springs are the headwaters of the San Marcos River.

Aquarena Center was designated as a "critical habitat," subject to the Endangered Species Act, because the springs are home to the fountain darter, the Texas Blind Salamander, the San Marcos Salamander, the San Marcos gambusia, and Texas Wild Rice. The San Marcos gambusia may be extinct as none have been seen since 1983.

=== Early settlements ===
The site contains more than 200 springs with water from the Edwards Aquifer and that discharge an average of 123 million US gallons (470,000 m^{3}) of water daily, is one of the oldest continuously inhabited places in North America. Artifacts discovered in digs conducted from 1979 to 1982 date back 12,000 years.

The first Europeans to visit the springs were probably Spanish explorers in 1689. The springs were an important stop on the Old San Antonio Road and the Chisholm Trail. In 1847, former Republic of Texas vice president Edward Burleson purchased the land surrounding the headwaters of the river and built a cabin on the hill overlooking the headwaters. Two years later Burleson built a dam just below the springs to power a mill. This dam, which created Spring Lake, still exists today.

Spring Lake has been visited by notable individuals including Robert E. Lee, Jay Gould, and Helen Miller Shepard.

=== Aquarena Springs ===
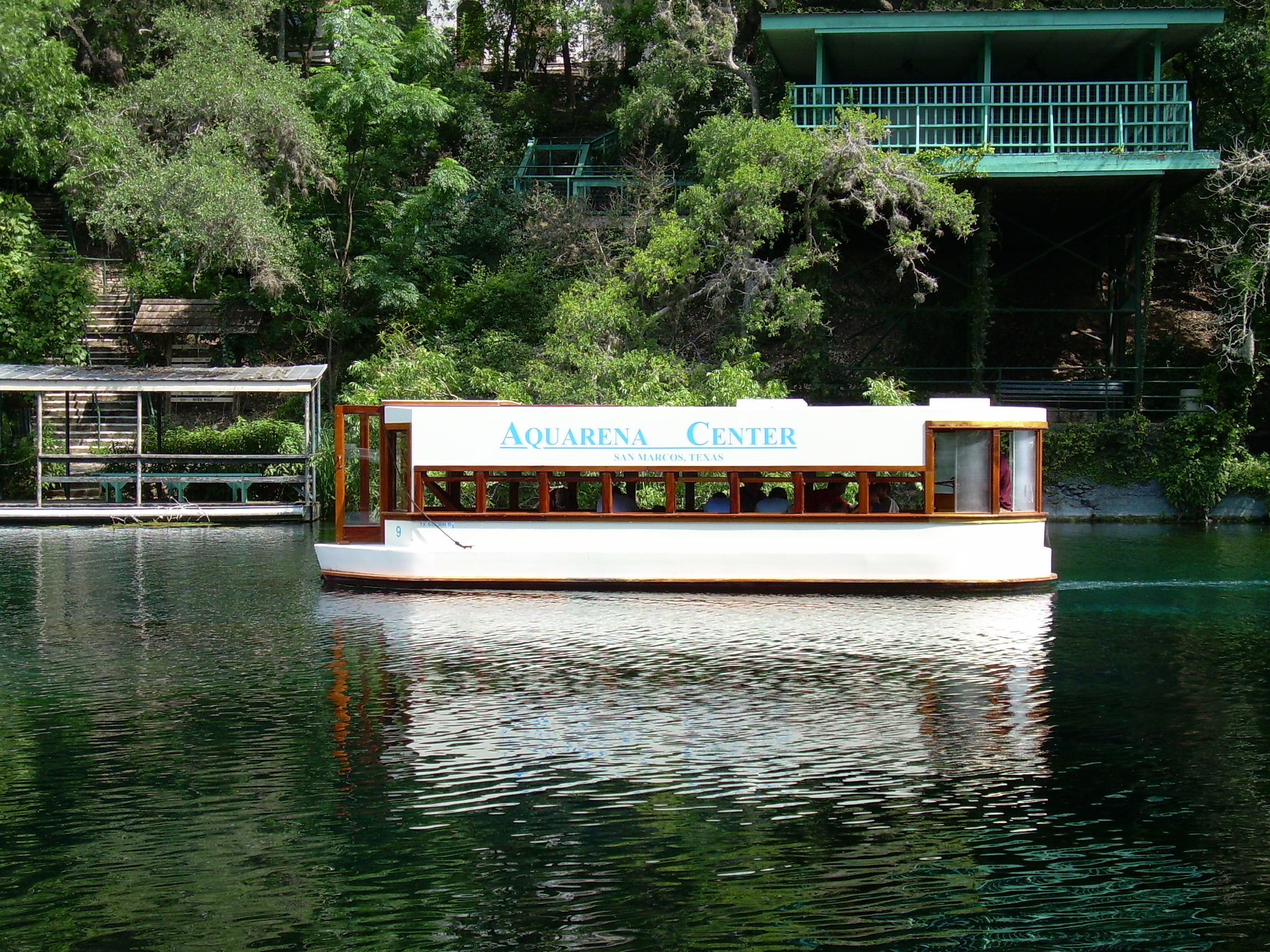
Antique glass bottomed boat tours are available daily and last about thirty minutes.

A.B. Rogers purchased the property in 1926 and his son, Paul, developed a hotel there in 1928 and introduced glass bottom boats to the lake.

In the 1950s, construction of a submarine theater and large spillway at one end of the lake to produce a swimming pool led to the opening of Aquarena Springs, an amusement park, at the site in 1951. Other features of the park were the Alpine Swiss Sky Ride (a Von Roll skyride), an Intamin 220 foot Sky Spiral that moved vertically above the lake and rotated 360°, and "Ralph, the Famous Swimming Pig" and "mermaid" performers that could be viewed from the submarine theater. The park also included a coin-operated arcade in which human visitors would "compete" in games like Tic-tac-toe against chickens, whose "moves" in the game were determined by pecking lights which appeared only on the chicken's side of the machine. At its peak, Aquarena Springs attracted 350,000 visitors annually.

Aquarena Springs was on the cover of Popular Mechanics and was featured in Life.

Since Aquarena Springs' closure, a documentary, Aquarena Springs and Ralph the Swimming Pig, was created in 2011 by Bob Phillips.

The Mermaid Society of Texas, founded in 2016, now hosts an annual promenade and festival for the river, celebrating Aquarena's mermaids.

In 2021, the Texas Congress passed Senate Concurrent Resolution No. 9, recognizing Aquarena Springs, the Aquamaids, and Ralph the Swimming Pig, and San Marcos as the Mermaid Capital of Texas.

=== Environmental center ===
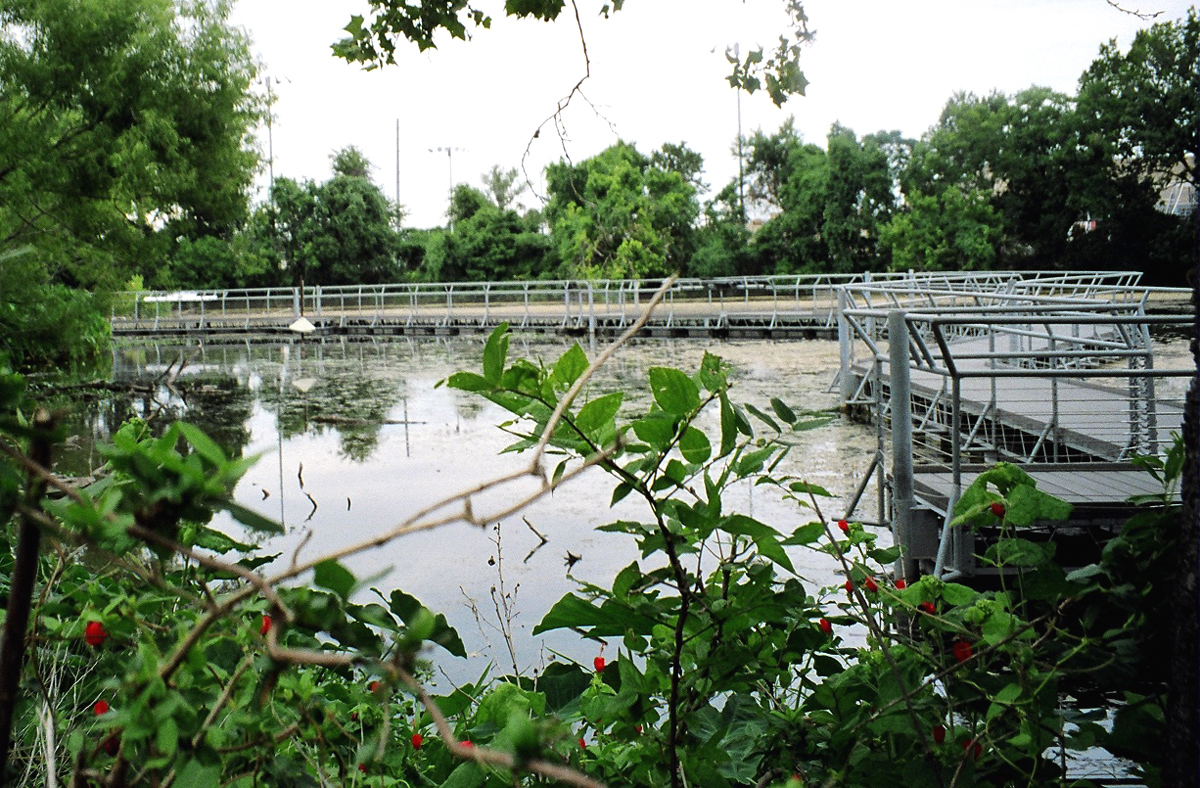
The Wetlands Boardwalk surrounds a shallow water habitat on Spring Lake

The site was acquired by Texas State University-San Marcos in 1994. Soon after, the demolition of Aquarena Springs' facilities commenced, finally concluding with the Submarine Theater and Sky Spiral in 2012.

After 2001 Andrew Samson established and directed the River Systems Institute at Texas State University in San Marcos. It's mission was to address Texas' water problems. The institute subsequently became the Meadows Center for Water and the Environment.

The new Meadows Center was created with an emphasis on habitat reclamation and environmental goals, adding a Wetlands Boardwalk in a shallow area of Spring Lake. The boardwalk, made of recycled plastic lumber, floats on the water and circles a marshy area that showcases the flora and fauna of a wetland ecosystem.

== Research ==
The main aim of the center is research.

The MCWE participates in underwater archaeology. It led the search for Henry Morgan's lost fleet, and played a role in rediscovering the Satisfaction in 2011. while exploring caves in Mexico, Spring Lake, and shipwrecks.

The center uses unmanned aircraft (Unmanned Autonomous Vehicle) to capture photos and gather information for projects related to fisheries, wildlife, and watershed management and restoration.

== International watershed studies ==
The Meadows Center is dedicated to the sustainable management of the world's freshwater resources.

== Spring Lake management ==
They oversee the Spring Lake Management Plan, which is designed to protect healthy ecosystems, provide research and educational opportunities, and offer access for service activities. As active partners in the Edwards Aquifer Habitat Conservation Plan, they help ensure minimum continuous spring flows of the Comal and San Marcos Springs.

== Filmography ==
The Aquarena Springs Amusement Park was the actual location of the resort in the 1978 film Piranha, directed by Joe Dante.

== Bibliography ==
- "What is Aquarena Center". Texas State University San Marcos Aquarena Center. Retrieved Jul. 28, 2005.
- Aquarena Center from the Handbook of Texas Online
- "Aquarena Springs". TexasEscapes.com. Retrieved Jul. 28, 2005.
- "San Marcos Springs". The Edwards Aquifer Homepage. Retrieved Jul. 28, 2005.
