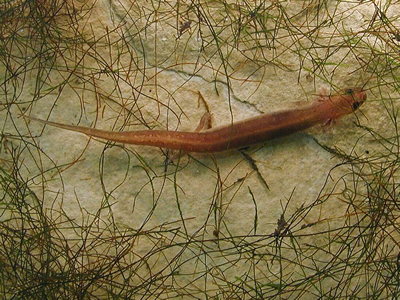

Conservation status
- Vulnerable (IUCN 3.1)

- Threatened (ESA)

Scientific classification
- Kingdom: Animalia
- Phylum: Chordata
- Class: Amphibia
- Order: Urodela
- Family: Plethodontidae
- Genus: Eurycea
- Species: E. nana

Binomial name
- Eurycea nana Bishop, 1941

= San Marcos salamander =

Species of amphibian

The San Marcos salamander (Eurycea nana) is a small species of aquatic, lungless salamander native to the United States, endemic to Spring Lake and a small region of the headwaters of the San Marcos River near Aquarena Springs, in Hays County, Texas. It is one to two inches long, with a slender body and external gills, and is reddish-brown in color.

== Description ==
E. nana is an aquatic salamander. It does not leave the water to change into a terrestrial form, but rather matures in the water. As a neotenic form, E. nana retains its gills for its lifetime. The San Marcos salamander has a narrow head with a round snout, large eyes, and a dark iris. External gills are developed and pigmented. 2–6 palatopterygoid and 7–13 premaxillary teeth are present. The species is uniformly light brown in color, with a series of seven to nine irregular light spots present along its midline. The trunk is flattened above with a dorsal furrow that extends from head to tail. The tail is slender and has a dorsal fin. The venter, the bottom of a salamander, is white in color, and males have larger vents than females do. There are 16–17 costal grooves present, with 6–7 occurring between limbs. It has four toes on its forefeet and five on its hind feet. The size of the species was measured to be 56 millimetres (2.2 in) total in length.

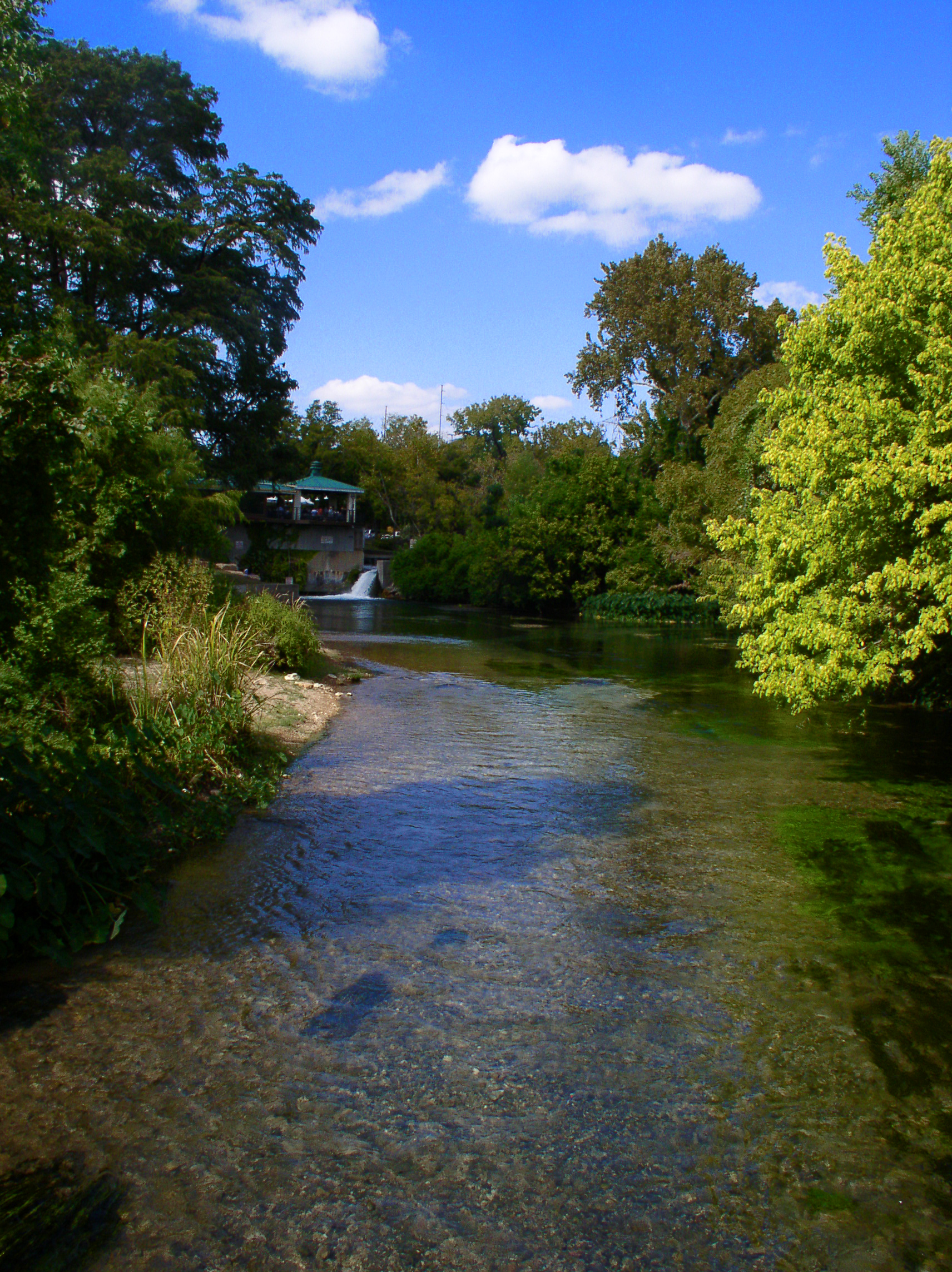
Downstream from the headwaters of the San Marcos Springs

== Taxonomy ==
The name nana is from the Greek nanos, meaning dwarf, as these adult salamanders are small in size. It is a member of the family Plethodontidae (lungless salamanders). Genetic variation of the species has not yet been observed.

E. nana may be confused with E. neotenes, the only other species thus found to be in its genus; however, E. nana is smaller in size with a more slender form.

== Distribution ==
Spring Lake, which is the headwaters of the San Marcos River, located in Hays County, Texas, is the only known location of the San Marcos salamander. The population estimate in 1973 was about 20,880 salamanders living in the uppermost reaches of Spring Lake. An estimate in 1993 suggested about 30,451 salamanders across all ranges of Spring Lake and up to 150 metres (490 ft) downstream. The ratio of males to females was reported to be stable throughout the year.

== Habitat ==
Clear, flowing spring water of the San Marcos River makes a well-delineated hydrologic system for the San Marcos Salamander. The springwater maintains a temperature of 21–22 °C (70–72 °F); the salamanders appeared to be stressed at waters over 30 °C (86 °F). Critical thermal maximum temperatures of the species show a lower threshold for juveniles than adults. E. nana are often found along the river substrates, such as rocks and vegetation. The uppermost shallow portion of Spring Lake features sand, gravel, and large limestone boulders that provide habitat. Further down, concrete banks and boulders provide space for aquatic moss such as L. riparium and blue-green algae. A variety of aquatic macrophytes, including S. platyphylla, M. brasiliense, L. repens, and V. americana are also present. Substrates without vegetation and muddy slit areas are unsuitable for E. nana, as those serve as protective covers against predation from larger fish, turtles, and aquatic birds.

== Diet ==
The diet of E. nana includes amphipods, fly larvae, and aquatic snails. San Marcos Salamanders typically follow a temporal diet, or a diet that varies with the availability of invertebrates present to them at a given time. It relies on the schedule of invertebrate behavior and locations, and generally consumes many aquatic invertebrates. The surrounding vegetation is a rich source of food.

== Behavior ==
E. nana displays predator avoidance responses relying on chemical cues from its native predators, such as Micropterus salmoides. Antipredator responses include freezing behavior to its fish predators. Site tenacity, the pattern of returning to the same nest or breeding site dependent on the season, was observed in both males and females of E. nana. This suggests that there is a selection favoring aggregation and shelter use as a part of anti-predatory tactics. Lab results show that predator-naïve salamanders showed a greater reduction in activity compared to predator-experienced salamanders, suggesting behavioral plasticity in avoidance responses. E. nana are also known to show predator generalization in response to novel predators similar to native ones. The E. nana response to their crayfish predators is unknown and studies to answer this question are currently ongoing.

The feeding behavior of the salamander is rather passive as it waits for prey to pass and will abruptly snap forward to catch its food. This suggests this response is likely generated from visual or vibrational cues from prey.

The San Marcos salamander breeds and lays eggs in standing ponds in the middle of dense mats of aquatic vegetation. Eggs are jelly-covered and will hatch in about 24 days. Male E. nana reaches maturity with a snout-vent greater than 19 millimetres (0.75 in). Four classes of ova are present: small-clear ova, small-opaque ova, small-yellow ova, and large-yellow ova. Female E. nana with a snout-vent greater than 26 millimetres (1.0 in) carry large yellow ova, and are considered ready for oviposition. E. nana relies primarily on chemical cues rather than visual cues for association preference. Both males and females exhibit sexual discrimination, suggesting the seeking out of potential mates—a rare behavior among salamanders. In addition, female and intersexual pairs are found cohabiting more than male pairs, suggesting selective aggressive behavior. While natural courtship and egg deposition have not been observed and documented as of yet, eggs of similar species of salamanders are known to be deposited on single plants and stones about 24 hours after courtship.

Depending on how light or dark the substrate is, E. nana can change its dorsal coloring from light tan to dark brown by migrating pigments in melanophores. The color of its gills also changes in response to the oxygen content of the surrounding water, where it appears bright red from increased blood flow in low-oxygenated waters to the point of resorption when kept at highly-oxygenated areas.

== Conservation status ==
The San Marcos salamander has been federally listed as a threatened species since 1980. Due to its extremely limited geographic range, it is threatened primarily by the contamination of groundwater sources and heavy dependence of central Texas cities upon the Edwards Aquifer for water. Other threats include drying of the spring and introduced species. As migration cannot introduce genetic variation due to limited geographic range, the loss of genetic diversity cannot recover naturally when lost. Availability of food and sufficient prey also remain of concern for these salamanders, but less so than habitat loss or change.

The San Marcos salamander and four other listed species are covered by the 1996 San Marcos/Comal (Revised) Recovery Plan, which includes recovery goals such as preserving the integrity and function of the aquifer and developing strategies to address both local and broad regional issues related to recovery. Experiments at the Dallas Aquarium were initiated to develop captive breeding techniques in case the natural population was lost. E. nana in captivity showed a 30% hatching success rate, with a single female producing potentially 176 eggs per year.

== Diseases ==
Kyphosis due to microsporidia, intracellular protistan parasites, has been reported in captivated E. nana.

Batrachochytrium dendrobatidis, a global threat to amphibians, has also been detected in E. nana. It causes chytridiomycosis and death in salamanders, and has led to multiple extinctions since its discovery.
