= Cinco Vodka =

American vodka brand

Cinco Vodka is produced in San Antonio, Texas. The company was founded by Richard "Trey" Azar III. The vodka is made from Idaho-sourced wheat and water drawn from the Edwards Aquifer. Cinco Vodka's differs from other vodka brands in that it is derived from a more labor-intensive and slower custom method that does not rely on charcoal filtration or sugar addition processes.
