= Metropolitan Water District =

Metropolitan Water District may refer to:

- Bexar Metropolitan Water District, now part of the San Antonio Water System
- Metropolitan Water District of Boston, now part of the Massachusetts Water Resources Authority
- Metropolitan Water District of Manila, the Phipppines, a precursor to the Metropolitan Waterworks and Sewerage System
- Metropolitan Water District of Southern California in the United States
