= Comal Springs (Texas) =

Spring in Texas, United States

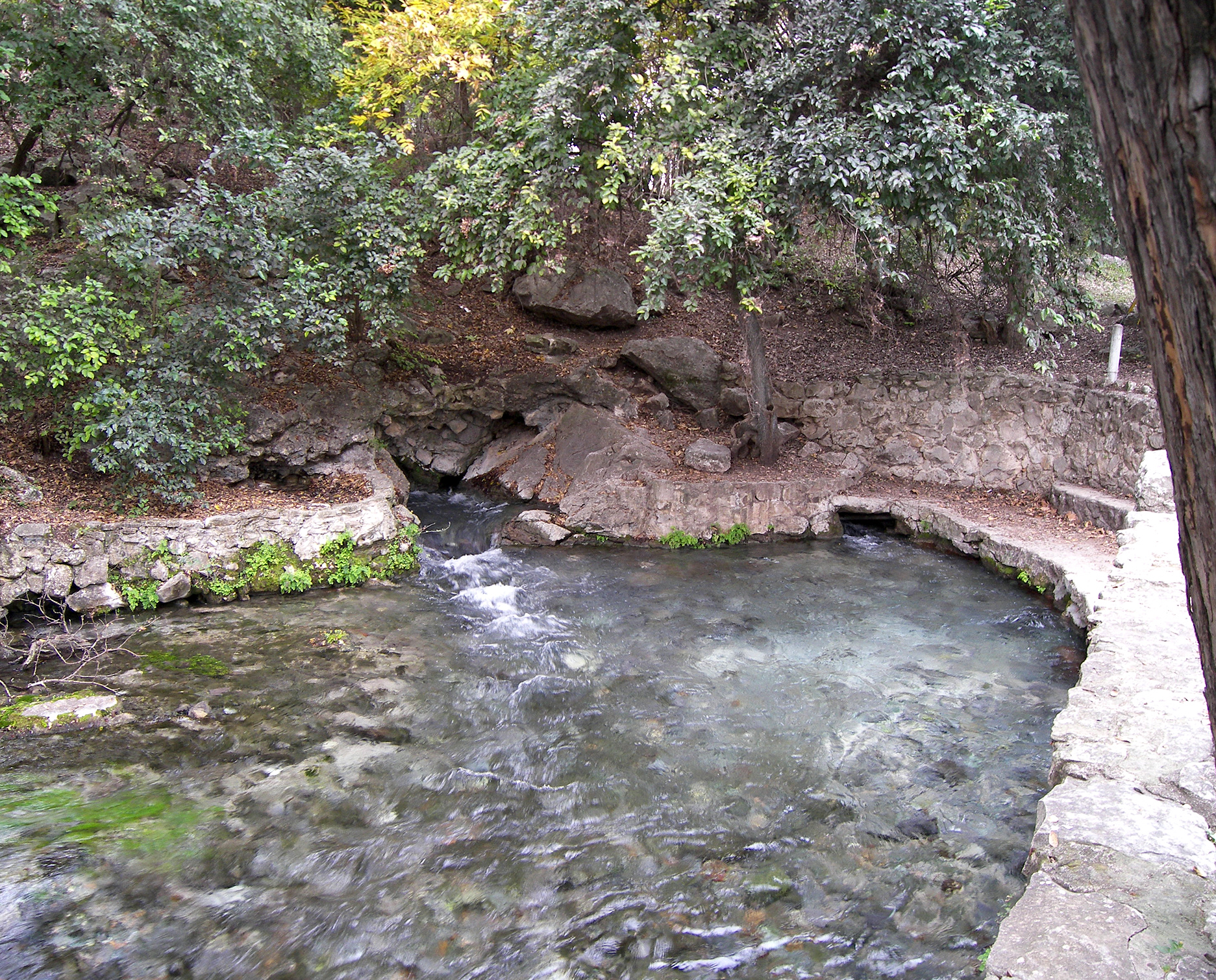
- The largest of the Comal Springs form the headwaters of the Comal River.
- Interactive map of Comal Springs
- Location: New Braunfels, Texas, US
- Coordinates: 29°42′59″N 98°08′01″W
- Spring source: Edwards Aquifer
- Elevation: 620 feet (190 m) above sea level
- Type: Karst spring
- Provides water for: Comal River
- Magnitude: 1
- Discharge: 318 cubic feet per second (9,000 L/s)

Comal Springs (/ˈkoʊmæl/ KOH-mal) are the largest concentration of naturally occurring freshwater springs in Texas. They are located in the city of New Braunfels and are the result of water percolating through the Edwards Aquifer formation.

== History ==
The springs were historically a magnet for the indigenous population of the region, often Tonkawas. The first Spanish explorer to visit the springs was Damián Massanet in 1691. The site was later home to a Spanish mission. Spanish settlers eventually called the site "Las Fontanas". The area has been home to a mixture of recreational and commercial endeavors, including Landa Park.

== Geology and natural history ==
The Comal Springs are fed by the Edwards Aquifer, a large karst aquifer that runs through most of central Texas. The aquifer consists of porous, water-bearing limestone features which channel rainfall and surface runoff from the aquifer's recharge zone down to various discharge zones, including the springs.

The Comal Springs are home to a variety of unique plant and animal life. One notable example is the fountain darter (Etheostoma fonticola). In addition to the association of groundwater availability with this locale along the Balcones Fault, the area is also considered an ecological dividing line for occurrence of some species; for example, the California Fan Palm, Washingtonia filifera occurs only at or west of Comal Springs, i.e. Balcones Fault zone.

== See also ==
- Comal River
- Guadelupe River
