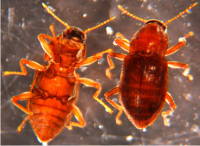

Conservation status
- Critically Imperiled (NatureServe)

- Endangered (ESA)

Scientific classification
- Kingdom: Animalia
- Phylum: Arthropoda
- Class: Insecta
- Order: Coleoptera
- Suborder: Polyphaga
- Infraorder: Elateriformia
- Family: Elmidae
- Genus: Heterelmis
- Species: H. comalensis

Binomial name
- Heterelmis comalensis Bosse, Tuff, and Brown, 1988

= Heterelmis comalensis =

Species of beetle

Heterelmis comalensis is a rare species of beetle known by the common name Comal Springs riffle beetle. It is endemic to Texas in the United States, where it occurs in only two springs. It is a federally listed endangered species of the United States.

== Description ==
This beetle was described as a new species in 1988. It is about 2 mm (0.079 in) long. It has nonfunctional wings and cannot fly.

== Habitat and conservation ==
The beetle lives in Comal Springs in Comal County and San Marcos Springs in Hays County, Texas. It occurs in shallow water in the gravel substrate and in riffles. It lives alongside other species such as the beetle Microcylloepus pusillus.

The main threat to this rare species is the slow loss of the Edwards Aquifer, which has long been tapped for its water. The aquifer feeds the springs in which the beetle lives. Some specimens are kept in captivity at the San Marcos National Fish Hatchery and Technology Center, and some larvae have been produced.
