= Edwards Aquifer Authority v. Day and McDaniel =

2012 Supreme Court of Texas case

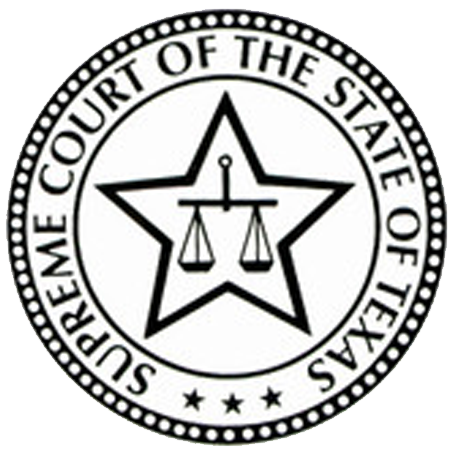
- Court: Supreme Court of Texas
- Decided: February 24, 2012

Edwards Aquifer Authority v. Day and McDaniel is a judgment of the Supreme Court of Texas.

== Facts ==
The Edwards Aquifer is the primary water source for much of southern central Texas. Burrell Day and Joel McDaniel owned a 350-acre ranch in Van Ormy, Bexar County. Under the Edwards Aquifer Authority Act (EAAA), landowners who had historically used Edwards Aquifer groundwater for irrigation purposes were assured of a minimum permit amount of 2 acre-feet of production per year per acre irrigated.

== Judgment ==
On February 24, 2012, the Supreme Court of Texas issued a 50-page, unanimous opinion written by Justice Nathan Hecht affirming the Fourth Court of Appeals decision.

Applying the case law applicable to oil and gas, the Texas Supreme Court determined that groundwater is "owned in place" by the landowner, and that this ownership right can support a claim for uncompensated taking under the state and federal constitutions.

== Commentary ==
The Texas Farm Bureau welcomed the decision. The rule on uncompensated taking was applied in Edwards Aquifer Authority v. Glenn and JoLynn Bragg.
