= Edwards Aquifer =

Source of drinking water in Texas

- Aquifer
- Downstream from the headwaters of the San Marcos River
- Location: Edwards Plateau, Texas Hill Country, Texas, United States
- Geology: Limestone karst

Area
  - Total: 3,237 km^{2} (1,250 sq mi)
- Website: Edwards Aquifer Website

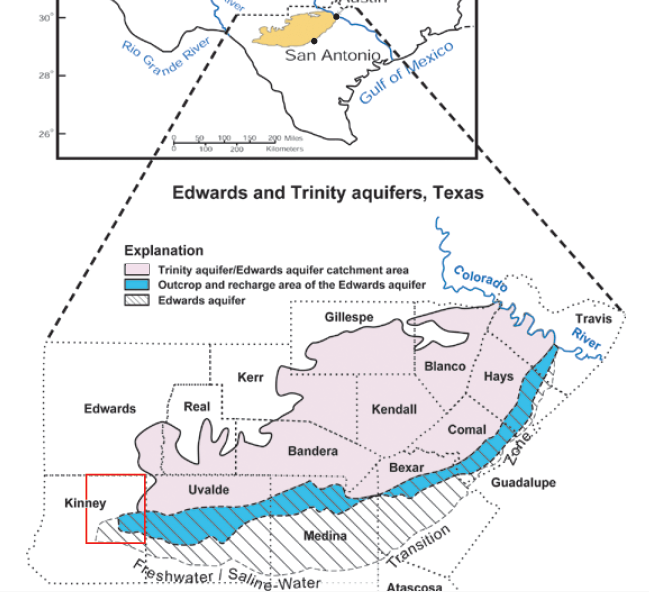
Edwards and Trinity Aquifers map

The Edwards Aquifer is one of the most prolific artesian aquifers in the world. Located on the eastern edge of the Edwards Plateau in the U.S. state of Texas, it is the source of drinking water for two million people, and is the primary water supply for agriculture and industry in the aquifer's region. Additionally, the Edwards Aquifer feeds the Comal and San Marcos Springs, provides springflow for recreational and downstream uses in the Nueces, San Antonio, Guadalupe, and San Marcos river basins, and is home to several unique and endangered species.

== Basin characteristics ==
=== Geography ===
Located in South Central Texas, the Edwards Aquifer encompasses an area of approximately 4,350 square miles (11,300 km^{2}) that extends into parts of 11 counties. The aquifer's boundaries begin at the groundwater divide in Kinney County, East of Brackettville, and extend Eastward through the San Antonio area and then Northeast where the aquifer boundary ends at the Leon River in Bell County. The aquifer is hydrologically separated into the Austin and San Antonio regions by a groundwater divide near the town of Kyle in Hays County.

The total area of the aquifer forms roughly the shape of a slight upward curve and approximately measures 160 miles (260 km) east to west at its furthermost boundaries and 80 miles (130 km) north to south at its widest section. The aquifer is geographically divided into four distinct regions: the total drainage area, recharge zone, artesian zone, and saline zone. These zones run east to west, with the drainage area forming the northernmost portion of the aquifer and the saline zone forming the southernmost portion. The artesian zone intersects the saline zone to the south and west at the fresh water - saline water boundary (FW-SW).

The aquifer's recharge zone, where surface water enters the aquifer, follows the Balcones Fault line, from Brackettville (roughly along U.S. Highway 90), through San Antonio, and north to Austin along but a few miles west of Interstate 35. On certain stretches of highway in Austin and San Antonio, signs indicate that the driver is entering or leaving the recharge zone, as the zone's easternmost edge sits beneath heavy urban and suburban development.

Its drainage area, where water is transported near the surface to the recharge zone, extends about 40 miles (60 km) north of the recharge zone at the west end, and tapers to end at a point in the east.

The artesian zone, where water springs from wells naturally due to the higher elevation of the recharge zone, extends 10 to 20 miles (15 to 30 km) south on the west end to only a few miles south on the east end. Across the eastern half of the aquifer, the recharge and artesian zones occupy common area.

=== Geology ===
Approximately 70 million years ago, activity of tectonic plates caused a revival of the Rocky Mountains. As these tectonic processes were occurring, millions of tons of sediments were deposited by alluvial and fluvial processes across Texas. The tremendous weight of these sediments resulted in faulting between the Edwards Plateau and the Gulf. The main geologic unit, known as the Edwards Limestone, is tilted downward toward the south and east and is overlain by younger limestone layers as well as several thousand feet of sediments. The Edwards Aquifer is a group of limestones and is considered a highly heterogenic aquifer. Three stratigraphic columns across the San Antonio area represent the Edwards Aquifer. These stratigraphic units are known as the Maverick Basin. the Devils River Trend, and the San Marcos Platform.

The Maverick Basin portion of the Edwards Aquifer consists of the West Nueces, McKnight, and Salmon Peak Formations. The Devils River Trend unit of the Edwards Aquifer is composed mostly of Devils River Limestone with a thickness of approximately 550 feet (170 m). The third unit of the Edwards Aquifer, the San Marco Platform, consists of the Kainer, Person, and Georgetown Formations.

==== Hydrogeology ====
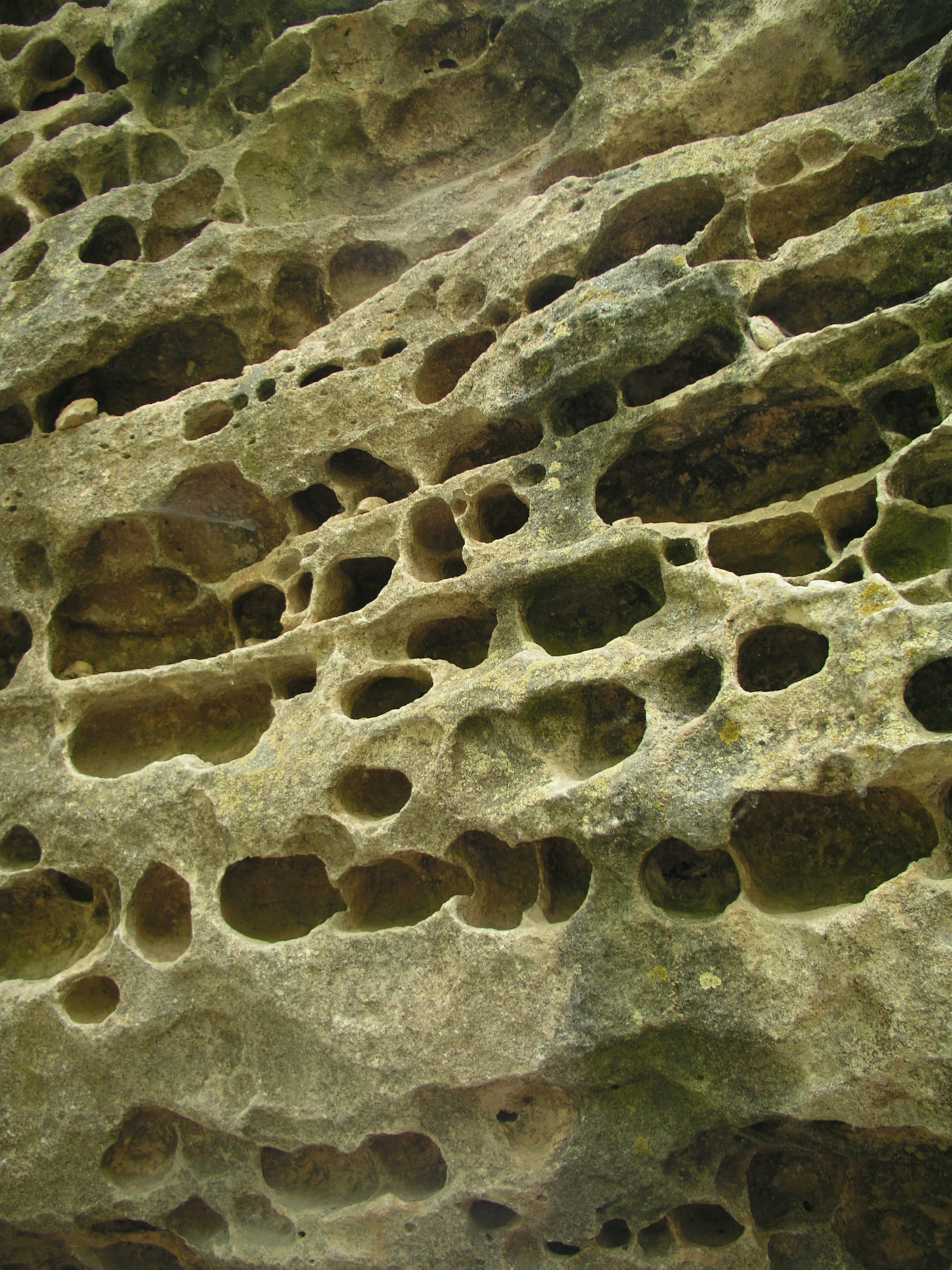
Example of a karst formation, from Segovia, Spain

The Edwards Aquifer is a highly productive karst aquifer made up of Edwards Group limestones. The Edwards limestone is variable in hydrologic character, but is generally highly porous and permeable, which makes it able to hold and move a lot of water. The limestone is broken by faults and joints. Water flows through these fractures and continues to dissolve the limestone, creating larger and larger pore spaces over time. Some units also store water in eroded fossil burrows that formed through the burrowing action of worms and crustaceans at the seafloor. The effective porosity, or the amount of water that is capable of being recovered, of the Edwards aquifer is estimated to be about 5%. The aquifer ranges in thickness from about 300 to 700 feet (90 to 200 m).

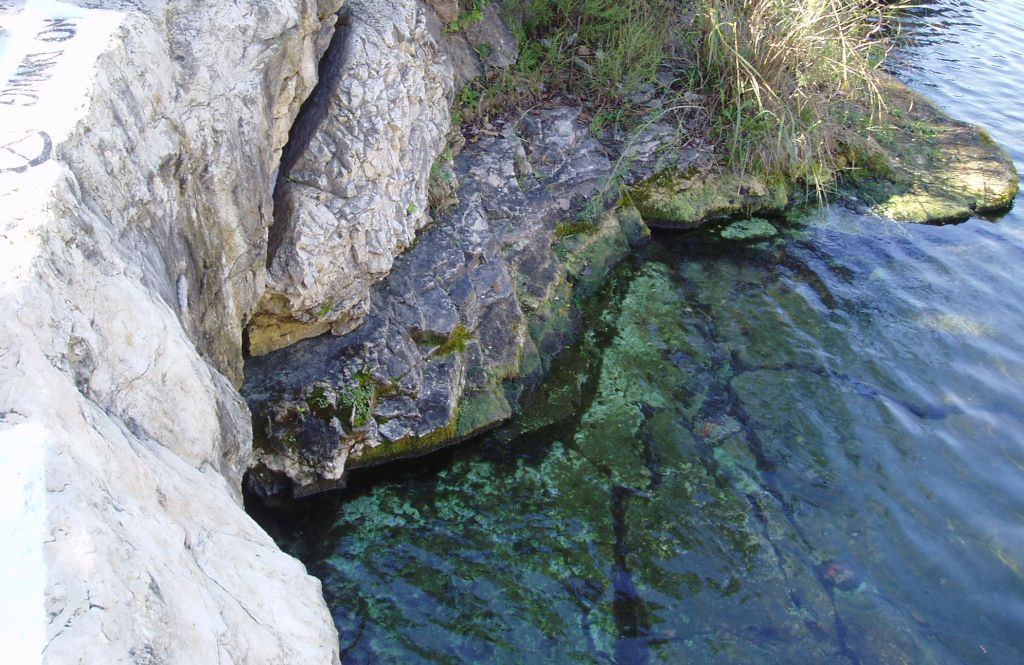
Main Barton Spring in Austin, Texas, a prominent fracture (visible here) in limestone rock. Through this artesian karst spring water emerges to the surface from the karstic Edwards Aquifer. This spring is situated near the diving board in Barton Springs Pool. Photo provided by US Geological Survey.

Unlike sand and gravel aquifers that store water in very small pore spaces, karst aquifers store water in large pockets or caverns, forming underground "rivers" and "lakes". The rate at which groundwater moves through these conduits can vary tremendously. In the Edwards Aquifer some water may barely move, while in other areas water may travel miles (thousands of meters) in a single day. On average, the Edwards aquifer has been modeled with a transmissivity of about 100 square feet per day (9 m^{2}/d).

In the south, the Edwards Aquifer dips beneath the lowland plains of the gulf coast. This area south of the recharge zone is referred to as the Artesian Zone, where the water is held under pressure by low permeability layers, and can flow to the surface without the assistance of pumps through openings like springs and artesian wells.

=== Climate ===
The Edwards aquifer underlies a portion of the Edwards Plateau thus the climate of the Edwards Plateau can be used to describe the climate in the aquifer's region. The eastern portion of the Aquifer falls in a Humid subtropical climate (Köppen climate classification Cfa or Cwa), while the western has a semi-arid steppe climate (BSk and BSh) The average annual temperature on the Edwards Plateau is 66 °F (19 °C) and the average annual precipitation amounts to 25.24 inches (641 mm). The temperatures vary by season with the lowest average temperature occurring in January, 50 °F (10 °C), and the highest temperature occurring in July or August, nearing 85 °F (29 °C) for both months. Conversely, January is the month with the lowest precipitation, averaging 1 inch (25 mm), while May and September average the most, 3 inches (76 mm). The proximity of the Edwards Plateau to the Gulf of Mexico and its location in the middle latitudes creates variation in the weather patterns experienced between different years, seasons, and months.

=== Water quality ===
Approximately 1.5 million people obtain their drinking water from the Edwards Aquifer. At present, the water quality of the aquifer has satisfied drinking water standards and there have been no significant issues with pollution contamination. Regular water quality testing through the USGS NAWQA Program occurred between 1996 and 2006. On a yearly basis, ions, metals, nutrients, bacteria, pesticides, VOCs, and synthesized chemicals remained below the EPA's published Maximum Contaminant Levels (MCLs). Dissolved nitrates (NO3) are detected throughout the entire aquifer at concentrations that exceeded the national background levels, but that are well below the MCL (10 mg/L). These nitrates may be the result of agricultural runoff that enters the aquifer through its recharge zone.

Due to the karst hydrogeology of the Edwards Aquifer, chemicals that enter the system have the potential to rapidly travel through the aquifer and contaminate down-gradient water sources in a short period of time (hours to days). Aquifers can be easily contaminated when pollutants enter the recharge zone. Because of this vulnerability to contamination, organizations have formed to protect the Edward's Aquifer recharge zones. Anthropogenically sourced pollutants (pesticides, VOCs, and synthetically derived compounds) can be found within the Edwards Aquifer at minuscule levels.

=== Ecology ===
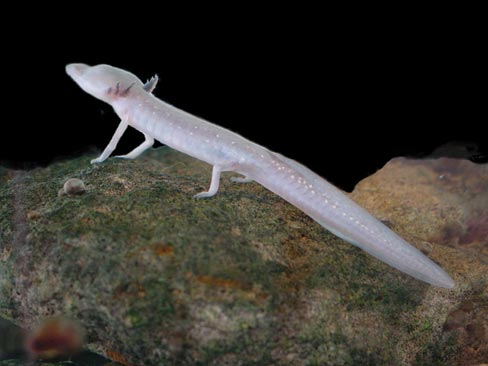
Texas blind salamander found in Edwards Aquifer

The Edwards Aquifer supports a wide variety of organisms, and several endemic species. The ecosystem is one of the most diverse subterranean aquatic ecosystems in the world. The widemouth blindcat (Satan eurystomus), a unique species of blind catfish, has been pumped out of wells almost 610 meters deep along the FW-SW boundary. However, all aquatic-dependent plants and wildlife in the Edwards Plateau area rely on the aquifer to support essential components of their habitats. Currently, the terrain is dominated by oak – juniper parks. The dominant woody plant on the Edwards Plateau is Ashe juniper (Juniperus ashei).

Edwards Aquifer is home to a large number of invertebrate species, 40 of which have been described. The most diverse groups are the prosobranch gastropods and amphipod crustaceans. The Edwards Aquifer has the highest recorded diversity of stygobites in the world. In the United States, only the fauna of the Edwards Aquifer of Texas has a significant component of marine-derived species. Of the major karst regions in the United States, it is the only one with a significant marine component. Of the 64 stygobionts known from the Edwards Aquifer, 17 are marine relics.

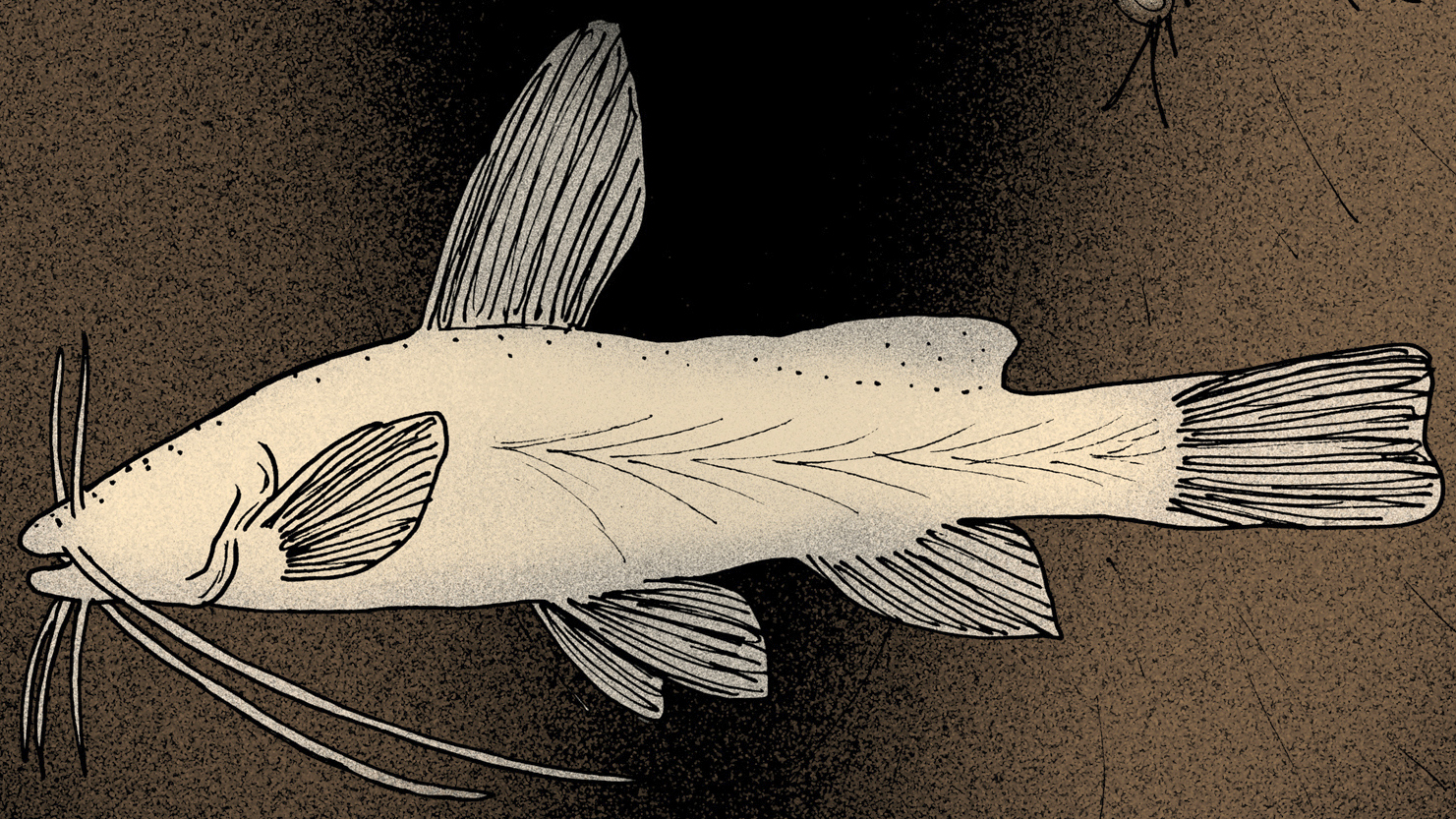
The Widemouth blindcat, a species of stygobitic catfish native to the aquifer

The U.S. Fish and Wildlife Service (USFWS) consider the Comal and San Marcos Springs ecosystems to have one of the greatest known diversities of organisms of any aquatic ecosystem in the Southwestern United States. This is due in part to the constant nature of the temperature and flow of the aquifer waters that have created unique ecosystems supporting a high degree of endemism. The Edwards Aquifer is the sole environment for the rare Barton Springs salamander (Eurycea sosorum), which is a federally listed endangered species. At Comal and San Marcos Springs, their openings and in the rivers and lakes originating from the springs, one threatened and seven endangered species have been listed by USFWS under the Endangered Species Act of 1973. The San Marcos salamander (Eurycea nana) is listed as threatened. Texas wild rice (Zizania texana), fountain darter (Etheostoma fonticola), Texas blind salamander (Eurycea rathbuni), Comal Springs riffle beetle (Heterelmis comalensis), Comal Springs dryopid beetle (Stygoparnus comalensis), and Peck's cave amphipod (Stygobromus pecki) are listed as endangered. Another species, the Blanco blind salamander, is unlisted because it is unknown whether the species is extant or extinct.

== Land use ==
Land use through the region atop the Edwards aquifer varies between rangeland, agricultural and residential/urban. The northern portion is primarily rangelands and contains most of the streams feeding the recharge zone. Until the late 1990s much of the land area that recharged the aquifer was undeveloped rangeland, but since that time it has undergone a significant increase in development. From 1996 to 1998 residential land use increased 9 percent in the Edwards aquifer recharge zone; even so, 72 percent remains undeveloped. The region atop the Edwards aquifer continues to increase in population today. In 2012, the US Census Bureau noted four counties located within the Edwards Region; Kendall, Comal, Hays and Travis were among the fastest growing in the nation, all with growth rates between 25 and 50 percent. An estimated 4.6 percent of the recharge zone is now covered with impervious surfaces which decrease aquifer recharge and can negatively affect water quality.

Almost all of agricultural lands and a large portion of San Antonio overlie the confined portion of the aquifer (Barker 1996). In an effort to preserve undeveloped land the city of San Antonio passed the Edwards Aquifer Protection Plan in 2000 (renewed in 2005, 2010 and 2015). The plan allows the city to purchase conservation easements for land in Bexar, Medina and Uvalde counties. The landowners retain and upon agreement the landowners cannot divide or develop the land and are paid 40-45% of market value for the easement. The plan has over 130,000 acres (525 km^{2}) enrolled.

== Demographics ==
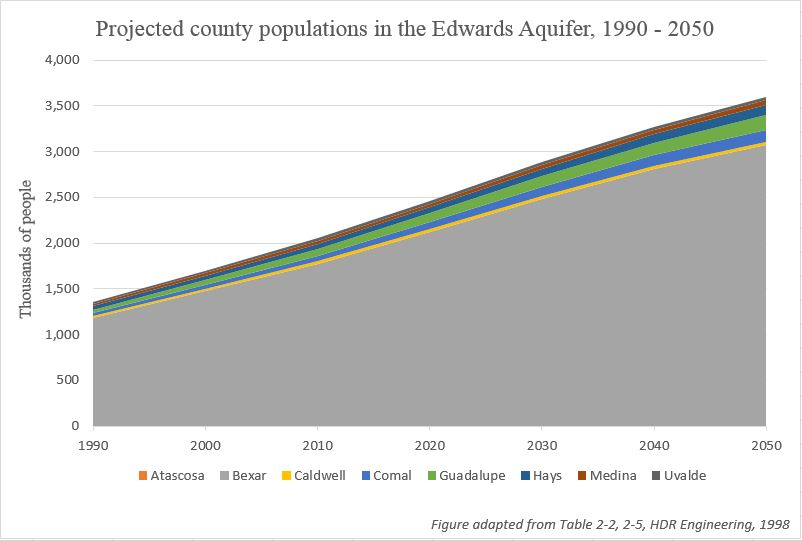

More than 1.7 million people rely on water from the Edwards Aquifer for municipal, industrial and daily use. One of the major cities on the aquifer is San Antonio, America's 7th largest city, with a population of over 1 million. San Antonio is heavily dependent on the Edwards Aquifer for their municipal, industrial and daily use. Another major city on the aquifer is Austin. More than 50,000 people in the city of Austin (6% of Austin's population) rely on the Barton Springs segment of the Edwards Aquifer.

Between 1990 and 2015, the population increased by two thirds, at this rate, the population of the basin will be doubled in 2050. The population across the counties have approximately the same growth rate of 10% per year. However, Comal and Guadalupe have a greater growth rate of more than 25% per year. This will increase the number of people relying on the aquifer for daily water use.

== Economy ==
The Edwards Aquifer underlies 38 counties in South and Western Texas. West Texas is regionally defined by jobs in the oil and gas industries, but is also home to mining support, agriculture, and transportation support, among other sectors. South Texas is regionally defined by recent economic growth in shipping industries, irrigation based farming, and manufacturing. According to the Texas Comptroller and Texas Water Development Board, the Southern region's economic growth and irrigation practices have put pressure on water demands that exceed supply, and this is expected to increase with economic and demographic trends between 2010 and 2060.

All of these economic practices in the region put pressure on both the quantity and quality of water in the Edwards Aquifer. A recent study showed that salinity in groundwater wells in the aquifer is high, potentially affected by adjacent, natural salt deposits as well as brine seepage from nearby oil fields. Additionally, irrigated agriculture is a significant user of the Edwards Aquifer groundwater, with a variety of crops cultivated, including: " vegetables, hay sesame, soybeans, peanuts, cotton, corn, sorghum, wheat, and oats". Also, the city of San Antonio is located along the eastern edge of the aquifer and was listed as the 7th largest city in the United States by population in 2014.

== Stakeholders ==
Historically, the Edwards Aquifer has served as the primary source of water for the city of San Antonio. This eight-county metropolitan area is the second fastest-growing area in the state of Texas and depends on the aquifer for both recreational use and clean drinking water. San Antonio Water System (SAWS) is the largest public water utility system that serves the eight counties of the San Antonio metropolitan area. A total of 92 water wells with a daily pumpage rate of 203.7 million U.S. gallons (771 megaliters) supply water to SAWS' customers.

In addition to the 2.3 million San Antonio residents are the communities of New Braunfels and San Marcos that depend on the aquifer for clean drinking water. Farming and ranching communities are other significant dependents of the aquifer. From the 1930s to the 1980s, withdrawals have quadrupled with over half of the current withdrawals serving municipal water purposes while the remaining goes to agricultural needs. More than 50,000 people in the city of Austin (6% of Austin's population) rely on the Barton Springs segment of the Edwards Aquifer.

Five groups of stakeholders have played significant roles in shaping the use and conservation of the aquifer, including the Edwards Aquifer Authority (EAA), New Braunfels, San Marcos, San Antonio, and Texas State University. Additionally, federal entities including US Geological Survey, US Fish and Wildlife Service, and US Environmental Protection Agency have been involved in water steward activities and recovery management plans of the Edwards aquifer system.

The EAA was created as a result of Edwards Aquifer Authority Act enacted by Texas State Legislature in 1993. The main purpose of EAA is to oversee the permitting system for water withdrawals from the aquifer system. A subdivision of state government, EAA is more of a liaison between federal agencies (e.g. USFWS, USEPA, USGS), state agencies (e.g. Texas Water Development Board, Texas Commission on Environmental Quality, etc.) and non-governmental organizations (e.g. Texas Water Conservation Association, Texas Association of Groundwater Districts).

Main stakeholders involved in water resources management in the Edwards aquifer system
Stakeholders	Involvement in aquifer resources management
Farmers and ranchers	Depend on water for crops and animal husbandry
Edwards Aquifer Authority	Responsible for permitting process for water withdrawal from the Edwards aquifer system
Metropolitan areas: Uvalde, San Antonio, New Braunfels, and San Marcos	Depend on water for drinking, recreational uses, utilities, and for irrigation
San Antonio Water System (SAWS)	Largest public utility system that relies on Edwards aquifer system.

== History ==
=== European colonization ===
Spanish missionaries who arrived in Texas in the 1700s looked to the Edwards Aquifer as their primary source of water. Springs fed by the aquifer played a key role in deciding the location of the Alamo mission and other settlements in the Texas Hill Country. As Europeans continued to settle the region, and as Texas was acquired by the United States, the Edwards Aquifer continued to supply water for farming, ranching, and rural domestic use.

=== Regulation and management ===
In the 1950s, Texas experienced the worst drought on record. Legislature for protection of the Edwards aquifer began in 1959 with the creation of the Edwards Underground Water District, which created and supplied maps and worked with licensing departments for development interests. Starting in the 1970s, the Texas Water Quality Board (TWQB) first recognized the aquifer and issued regulations regarding surface recharge zones. Following these first steps, regulations began to include the need for geologic assessments prior to development, design standards for underground storage tanks and pipes, and fees for development.

In 1992, the TWQB declared the Edwards aquifer an underground river due to the presence of endangered species, but this was overturned later the same year. In 1993, Texas Senate Bill 1477 established the Edwards Aquifer Authority to manage the aquifer and to limit pumping to protect the spring flow levels.

In 1997, Chapter 36 of the Texas Water Code was amended by Senate Bill 1 of the 75th Texas Legislature to require all underground water conservation districts in Texas to develop a groundwater management plan and submit it for approval by the Texas Water Development Board every five years on the anniversary of initial approval (September 17, 1998 for the Edwards Aquifer Authority). The initial requirements of the groundwater management plans were that they address the efficient use of groundwater, methods of controlling and preventing waste of groundwater, conjunctive surface water issues, natural resource issues that affect the use and availability, of groundwater, and methods of controlling and preventing subsidence.

The requirements of groundwater management plans have since undergone expansion to require the inclusion of planning requirements for addressing drought conditions and conservation (2001, the 77th Texas Legislature Senate Bill 2), estimates of the managed available groundwater, the amount of groundwater used within each district, the amount of recharge from precipitation, projected surface water supply, total water demand within the district, and consideration of water management strategies that were included in the adopted state water plan (2005, 79th Texas Legislature HB 1763). Senate Bill 2 of the 77th Texas Legislature also required the groundwater conservation districts to submit groundwater management plans to the Chair of any Regional Water Planning Group in which any part of the district is located so that they may specify any area(s) that conflict with the approved Regional Water Plan[1].

In addition to the groundwater management plan, the Edwards Aquifer Authority board of directors maintains a three-year rolling strategic plan that is updated annually. The 2015-2017 strategic plan adopted on October 14, 2014 identifies six major goals:

- Goal A: Sustain Federally Protected Aquifer-Dependent Species
- Goal B: Ensure Effective Management of the Edwards Aquifer
- Goal C: Enhance Recharge Program for Improved Aquifer Management and Springflow Maintenance,
- Goal D: Prevent the Pollution of the Aquifer
- Goal E: Conduct Research that Enhances Understanding and Effective Management of the Aquifer
- Goal F: Develop a Diverse, Service-Oriented Organization
- Goal G: Build Shared Value in the EAA Mission
- Goal H: Sustain Fiscal Stability [3]

With the growth of regional cities such as San Antonio, municipal demand for water increased. The second half of the twentieth century saw a high volume of legal activity regarding rights to the aquifer.

== Water balance ==
Although between 25 and 55 million acre-feet (30 and 70 teraliters) of water may be present in the Edwards aquifer, only a small portion of this water is practically or legally available for use. Storage is the difference between recharge (inputs) and discharge (outputs) from the Edwards Aquifer.

Annual storage can be negative during dry years with high water use and positive during wet years with relatively low water use. A long-term negative imbalance between recharge and discharge in an aquifer may lead to the depletion of the available water in the aquifer.

Annual storage between 1955 and 2012 estimated from data provided by a continuing program between the U.S. Geologic Survey and the Edwards Aquifer Authority ranged from −633,000 to 1,653,000 acre-feet per year (−780 to 2,000 gigaliters per year). The average storage during this period was 37,000 acre-feet per year (46 GL/a).

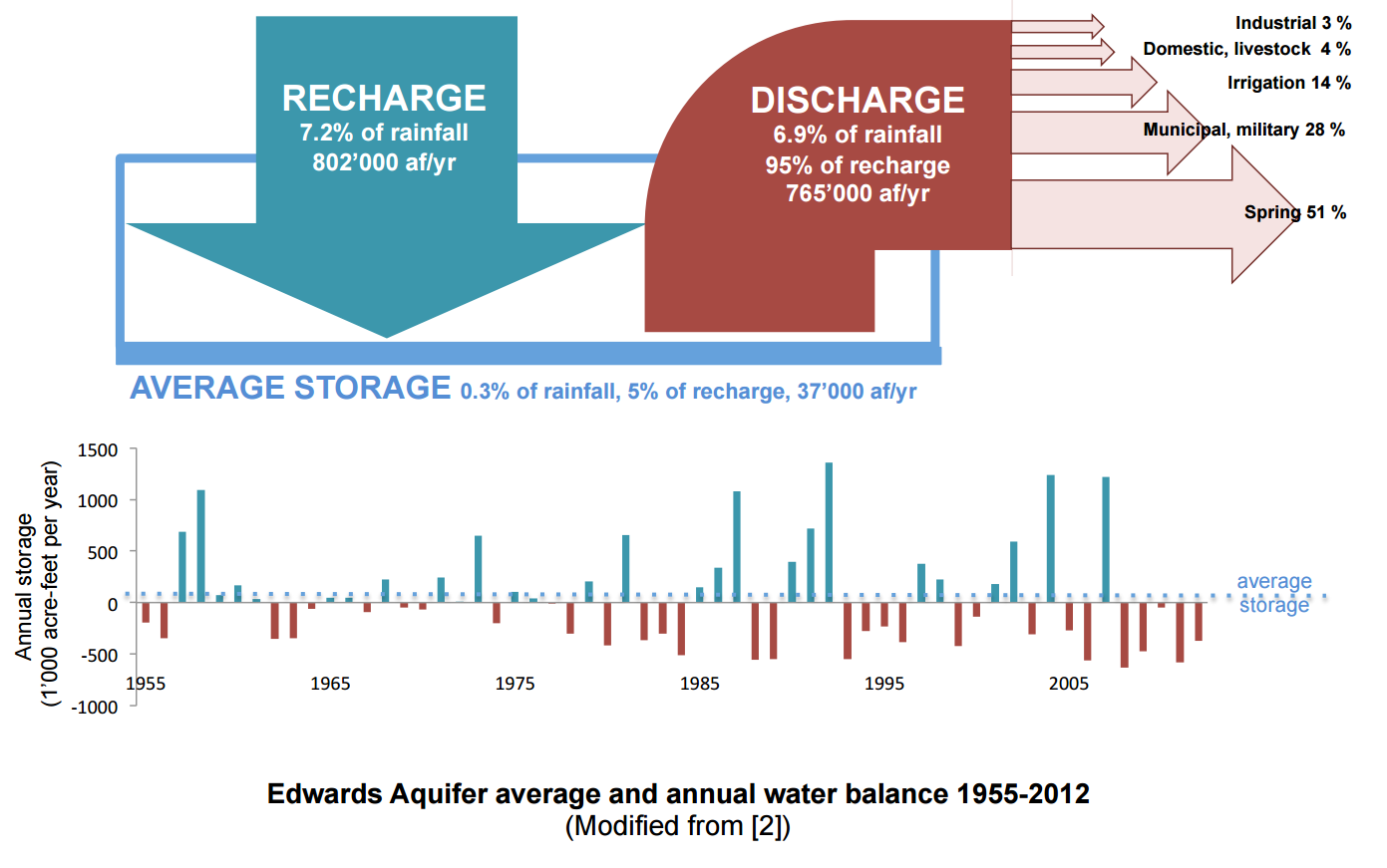
Water inputs, outputs, and storage to the Edwards Aquifer based on data collected by the Edwards Aquifer Authority between 1955 and 2012

=== Inputs (recharge) ===
Water mainly enters the Edwards Aquifer in two ways: it either falls as precipitation and percolates directly into the aquifer, or it enters as streamflow flowing through the Recharge Zone. The Recharge Zone occurs along the Balcones Fault Zone where the Edwards Plateau drops steeply and meets the Gulf Coastal Plain. Here, highly fractured limestones are exposed at the Earth's surface, which allow rain and streamflow to infiltrate directly into the aquifer.

The Contributing Zone, which occurs on 5,400 square miles (14,000 km^{2}) of the Edwards Plateau (Texas Hill Country), collects precipitation and streamflow that drain to the Recharge Zone. Major streams draining the Contributing Zone include Cibolo Creek, Helotes Creek, Barton Creek, and Onion Creek. Water is unable to percolate into the aquifer in the Contributing Zone because much of the underlying geology is impermeable.

Average precipitation in the region is around 30 inches (760 mm) per year. Only precipitation that falls on the contributing area is available for infiltration. With a contributing and recharge area of over 26,650 square miles (17,000 km^{2}), the mean annual volume of precipitation that is available for recharge is 10,660,000 acre-feet (13.1 TL), or the equivalent of 5.3 million Olympic sized swimming pools. The average annual recharge rate between 1934 and 2013 is estimated to be 699,000 acre-feet (862 GL). The median annual recharge is 556,950 acre-feet (687 GL), or only 6% of the total inputs to the system.

=== Outputs (discharge) ===
Water from the Edwards Aquifer is discharged in two ways: it is either pumped from wells (well discharge) or it leaves as stream outflow (spring discharge). The Edwards Aquifer Authority (EAA) and the United States Geological Survey (USGS) have monitored annual well and spring discharges since 1934.

Annual well discharge—the sum of all well discharges in a year— ranged from 219,300 to 542,500 acre-feet (271 to 669 GL) between 1955 and 2012. The average well discharge for this period was approximately 371,667 acre-feet (458 GL), equivalent to 183,000 Olympic-sized swimming pools.

Annual spring discharge ranged from 69,800 to 802,800 acre-feet (86 to 990 GL) between 1955 and 2012. The average spring discharge for this period was approximately 392,991 acre-feet (485 GL).

During dry years, more water is discharged from wells while during wet years, more water is discharged from springs. Annual total groundwater discharge from pumping and springs ranged from 388,800 to 1,130,000 acre-feet (480 to 1,394 GL), and the average total groundwater discharge for 1955 to 2012 period was approximately 764,431 acre-feet (943 GL).

Edwards Aquifer discharge summary for 2013 in acre-feet, by county and use
	Reported Use (Permitted Wells)			Unreported Use		Subtotals		Total Discharge
County	Irrigation	Municipal	Industrial	Domestic/Livestock	Non-reporting facilities	Well	Spring	Total Discharge
Atascosa	1,208	0	0	0	0	1,208	0	1,208
Bexar	4,179	216,051	15,648	8,893	5,046	249,817	51	249,868
Comal	63	5,781	7,061	390	0	13,295	141,412	154,707
Guadalupe	0	69	167	0	0	236	0	236
Hays	177	2,341	1,292	858	195	4,863	91,210	96,073
Medina	33,755	5,911	2,007	1,089	0	42,762	0	42,762
Uvalde	36,959	3,870	95	2,510	209	43,643	133	43,766
Totals:	76,341	234,023	26,270	13,740	5,450	355,824	232,806	588,630

=== Hydrologic modeling ===
Scientists with the United States Geologic Survey have developed numerical groundwater flow models for the San Antonio and Barton Springs aquifer segments to determine the amount of water in the aquifer, the direction it is flowing, and its velocity. These are used to estimate the sustainable levels of groundwater withdrawal throughout the aquifer. Given ample data is needed for numerical simulations, yet often lacking, regional modeling of large aquifers is difficult, but modeling segments within an aquifer is common and provides useful information for water users throughout the aquifer.

Aquifer storage is correlated with water levels recorded in the J-17 Bexar index well which serves as the sole official monitoring well in the Edwards Aquifer. The J-17 well, is located in the artisanal confined Edwards Aquifer at a location AY-68-37-203 based on the latitude and longitude. Water levels have been recorded in the J-17 well since the 1910s, and is used to generalize the entire aquifer system. Changes in aquifer storage are used to estimate recharge rates.

In the Edwards aquifer, groundwater flow models have been developed for the San Antonio and Barton Springs aquifer segments in the San Antonio region of Texas. Two model simulations were conducted: steady state and transient. A steady-state groundwater flow model requires magnitude and direction of flow remain constant, whereas a transient model simulation allows for a change in water storage over time. Steady-state results suggest water leaving the aquifer occurs through springs (73.3 percent), water well pumping (25.7 percent), and to the Colorado River (0.6 percent). Inflow of water to the aquifer mostly occurs through natural recharge (93.5 percent) and water delivered through the aquifer's regional boundaries (6.5 percent). The transient simulation model also suggests discharge primarily occurs through springs, followed by water well pumping; however, changes in water storage is heavily dependent upon the amount of monthly precipitation and water well pumping volumes.

== Policy ==
Edwards Aquifer Authority regulates withdrawal permits, transfers, and groundwater conservation plans under authority granted by the Texas legislature. Groundwater law in the state of Texas is governed by the Rule of Capture, which gives landowners the right to pump groundwater beneath their land, with the exception of drilling a lateral well extending under a neighbor's property, wasting water, or pumping with the intention of causing harm to a neighbor's well. In order to construct a well to withdraw water from the Edwards Aquifer, however, a user requires a permit that is granted by the Edwards Aquifer Authority. Permits for existing users are determined by maximum historical use, taking into consideration the overall availability of water in the aquifer.

Wells that produce less than 25,000 gallons per day, wells that are solely for the purpose of watering livestock, and a few other exceptions are considered exempt wells that do not require a permit. Permits for withdrawal can be transferred to another user, provided that the new use is beneficial and occurs within the boundaries of the Authority, with a few geographical exceptions.

Groundwater conservation plans are required for permit holders who withdraw more than 3 acre-feet per year (2,700 U.S. gal/d; 10 kL/d), unless irrigators can prove more than 60 percent efficiency in their water use. Conservation plans require the use of Best Management Practices, as determined by the Edwards Aquifer Authority.

In recharge zones of the aquifer permits are required to store regulated substances that could damage water quality. Additionally, The Texas Commission of Environmental Quality requires special permits for construction in the recharge zones of the aquifer.

=== Conservation efforts ===
Encompassing an area of 8 counties across south-central Texas including the City of San Antonio and its surrounding communities, the Edwards Aquifer is the main water supply source for the region, providing water for agricultural and industrial purposes and necessary water flow for endangered species habitat, as well as recreational purposes. As a result of a lawsuit filed by the Sierra Club under the Federal Endangered Species Act in 1991, the Edwards Aquifer Authority (EAA) was created to oversee the aquifer in its conservation efforts.

The Texas Legislature directed the EAA to regulate pumping from the aquifer, implement critical period management restrictions, and pursue measures to ensure minimum continuous spring flows of the Comal and San Marcos Springs are maintained to protect endangered and threatened species to the extent required by federal law. In 2013, the U.S. Fish and Wildlife Service approved Edwards Aquifer Authority's Habitat Conservation Plan (HCP), which is a regional 15-year plan designed to protect the water flow and species in the Edwards Aquifer region.

The HCP supports three major project groups of habitat protection measures, flow protection measures, and supporting measures such as applied research, ecological and biological, and water-quality monitoring. HCP project examples include minimization and mitigation of the impacts of low flow, by restoring native riparian zones in order to benefit the Comal Springs riffle beetle by increasing the amount functional habitat and food sources (i.e., root structures and associated biofilms). The method of riparian zone establishment will include the removal of non-native, followed by the replanting of native vegetation that may be considered representative of a healthy, functioning riparian zone.

Although implementation of the HCP exists primarily within the EAA, a broad group of stakeholders plays a role in the management of the Edwards Aquifer. The National Research Council (NRC) committee, formed by the National Academy of Sciences (NAS), released the first of three scientific reports in 2015 that evaluate and make recommendations for Habitat Conservation Plan programming of the Edwards Aquifer.

== Legal activity ==
In the past conflict existed between the Sierra Club and US Federal and State agencies, cities, and industrial water users. The conflict is between groups that want to pump more water from the aquifer for human use and those that want to keep water in the aquifer, to feed springs which provide habitat from endangered species. This conflict tends to emerge after periods of drought in 1988 and in 1995-1996

In the initial lawsuit was Sierra Club v. Babbitt in 1991. The plaintiffs included environmental groups (Sierra Club), water districts (Guadalupe-Blanco River Authority and Bexar Metropolitan Water District), municipalities (City of San Marcos and City of New Braunfels), and utilities (Green Valley and Atascosa Rural Water Supply corporations). The defendants included, government agencies (US Fish and Wildlife Service, State of Texas, Texas Parks and Wildlife Department), City of San Antonio, and multiple industrial water users.

In Sierra Club v. Babbitt the plaintiffs claimed that the defendants were not fulfilling their duties under the Endangered Species Act, to protect endangered species and their ecosystems. The endangered species included the Fountain Darter, San Marcos Salamander, San Marcos Gambusia, Texas Blind Salamander, and Texas Wild-rice. The ecosystems for these species depends on water from Comal Springs and San Marcos Springs which have the potential to run dry if too much water is withdrawn from Edwards Aquifer.

The final decision sided with the Sierra Club and other plaintiffs and in 1993 restrictions were placed on pumping from Edwards Aquifer. As an outcome of Sierra Club v. Babbitt as a result of this lawsuit, legislation was passed which created the Edwards Aquifer Authority. This was also not the end of litigation, there was an attempt to appeal the initial Sierra Club v. Babbitt in 1993 Sierra Club v. Babbitt the appeal was denied because the US Fish and Wildlife Service agreed with the original ruling, and the City of San Antonio and industrial water users were unable to prove that they were injured by the original Sierra Club v. Babbitt ruling.

Due to Sierra Club v. Babbitt, the Edwards Aquifer Act 1993 was passed which created the Edwards Aquifer Authority to oversee pumping regulations. In the case Barshop v. Medina Under. Wat. Cons. Dist. 1996, Medina County Under Water Conservation District challenged the Edwards Aquifer Authority over the constitutionality of the Edwards Aquifer Act. The challenge was over whether property owners have the constitutional right to pump water from their land, or whether concerns for water conservation and endangered species take precedence. Barshop v. Medina Under. Wat. Cons. Dist. went to the Texas Supreme Court where the Edwards Aquifer Act was upheld.

In an effort to reduce San Antonio's dependency on the solitary supply of the Edward's Aquifer, the San Antonio Water System (SAWS) has proposed a water supply pipeline, the Vista Ridge, extending 82,000 ft from Burleson County to San Antonio. SAWS reports that the Vista Ridge pipeline, running 54" in diameter, will supply as much as 50,000 ac-ft of water per year for 30 years, upon the project's estimated completion in 2019. This will increase the city's current water supply by 20%.

By 2020, SAWS estimates the average San Antonio residential water bill to be $88/mnth; this would place San Antonio at the lowest rate for water in any major Texan city. The water is provided through over 3,400 leases with private landowners drawing from the Caririzo and Simsboro aquifers. In an effort to protect the ratepayer (i.e. San Antonio citizens), the project proposes an undetermined lifeline rate. Any water that fails to be delivered (i.e. shortages, contamination) will be compensated by Blue Water Systems, L.P and not at the expense of the ratepayer.

This project is projected to promote job growth and prosperity surrounding the city, as the supply will withstand San Antonio's projected growth rate of 20,000 people/year. Companies invested in the project lobbied for a state drought-planning bill to enable regional approval for the sale of private activity bonds. Despite strong support from the house, the bill failed at the end of May 2015, due to lack of support in the senate. Consequently, the project requires approval from each of the seven counties along the route.

Those in favor of the Vista Ridge pipeline believe the project will help protect and sustain the Edwards Aquifer, as well as enable the conservation of diversified water. Those who oppose the pipeline are concerned that installment will damage the natural system's ability to recharge the Edwards Aquifer and retain soil moisture. Further, whether or not the city needs additional supply is in question, as projected increase in water demand is speculated to present commercial expansion, not San Antonio's municipal population demand. Environmental groups, such as the Sierra Club, suggest the project is allocating funds to an unsustainable solution, and that San Antonio should instead be "investing in alternative and innovative resources that are less expensive, less energy-intensive, and locally accessible."

== See also ==
- Balcones Canyonlands NWR
- Balcones Fault
- Barton Springs
- Barton Springs Salamander
- Central Texas
- Comal River
- Comal Springs
- Edwards Aquifer Authority v. Day and McDaniel
- Edwards Plateau
- Guadalupe River
- San Antonio Water System
- San Marcos River
- Texas Blind Salamander
- Texas Hill Country
