= Centrocestus formosanus =

Scientific classification
- Kingdom: Animalia
- Phylum: Platyhelminthes
- Class: Trematoda
- Order: Plagiorchiida
- Family: Heterophyidae
- Genus: Centrocestus
- Species: C. formosanus

Binomial name
- Centrocestus formosanus Nishigori, 1924

Species of fluke

Centrocestus formosanus, the mystery fluke, is a trematode parasite of Asian origin that has found its way into North American streams and rivers. It not only affects the fountain darter, but also many species of commercially important fishes. It is also capable of infecting humans.

The parasite is transmitted by a freshwater snail red-rimmed melania Melanoides tuberculata that was introduced in the United States and Mexico in the 1960s. The parasite is believed to have been introduced from shipments of black carp to fish farms in Mexico. The definitive hosts of C. formosanus appear to be piscivorous birds that migrate along the central flyway from South America to North America.
