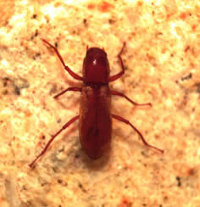

Conservation status
- Critically Imperiled (NatureServe)

- Endangered (ESA)

Scientific classification
- Kingdom: Animalia
- Phylum: Arthropoda
- Clade: Pancrustacea
- Class: Insecta
- Order: Coleoptera
- Suborder: Polyphaga
- Infraorder: Elateriformia
- Family: Dryopidae
- Genus: Stygoparnus; Barr & Spangler, 1992
- Species: S. comalensis

Binomial name
- Stygoparnus comalensis Barr & Spangler, 1992

= Stygoparnus =

Genus of beetles

Stygoparnus is a monotypic genus of beetles containing the single species Stygoparnus comalensis, which is known by the common name Comal Springs dryopid beetle. This rare beetle is endemic to Texas in the United States, where it is known from two springs. It is a federally listed endangered species of the United States.

The Comal Springs dryopid beetle was first collected in 1987 and described as a new species in 1992. This beetle is 3 to 3.7 millimeters long. A subterranean species, it has vestigial eyes and faint pigmentation. It is the only known aquatic species in its family. It is known from Comal Springs in Comal County, and Fern Bank Springs in Hays County, Texas. Though it lives in springs, the beetle does not swim and perhaps lives in air pockets in the caves. Little is known about the life history of the beetle because the karst cave habitat is difficult to explore.

The beetle lives in one spring which is fed by the Edwards Aquifer, and one spring that has an unknown water source. The Edwards Aquifer has long been tapped for its water, which is used for many purposes, such as irrigation. The primary threat to the species and other rare local endemic animals such as Peck's cave amphipod is the loss of the water source which feeds the springs.
