= San Antonio Water System =

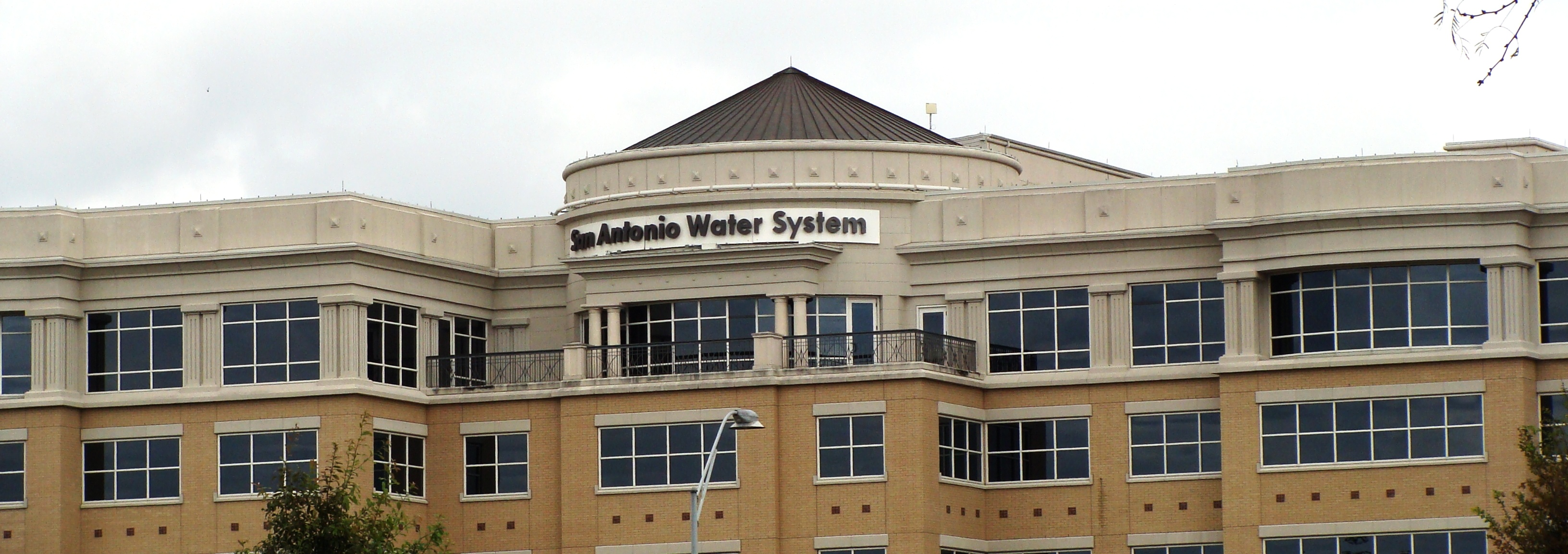
SAWS headquarters

The San Antonio Water System (SAWS) is the largest drinking water and sewage utility in Bexar County, Texas, United States. Based in the Midtown Brackenridge district of San Antonio, SAWS draws water from the Edwards Aquifer to service its customers in all 8 counties of the Greater San Antonio metropolitan area. SAWS is owned by the City of San Antonio.

SAWS was formed on May 19, 1992, as a result of a merger of three separate entities: the City Water Board, the City Wastewater Department, and the Alamo Water Conservation and Reuse District. In 2012, SAWS took over (merged with) another local water utility, Bexar Metropolitan Water District (BexarMet).
