= San Marcos gambusia =

Conservation status
- Extinct (yes) (IUCN 3.1)

- Extinct (ESA)

Scientific classification
- Kingdom: Animalia
- Phylum: Chordata
- Class: Actinopterygii
- Division: Teleostei
- Order: Cyprinodontiformes
- Family: Poeciliidae
- Genus: Gambusia
- Species: †G. georgei

Binomial name
- †Gambusia georgei C. Hubbs & Peden, 1969

Extinct species of fish

The San Marcos gambusia (Gambusia georgei) is a likely extinct species of Gambusia from the family Poeciliidae that was found only in the San Marcos Springs of Central Texas. The fish has not been seen since 1983.

== Etymology ==
The specific name of this fish honors the American ichthyologist George S. Myers (1905–1985).

== Description ==
The San Marcos gambusia was typically less than 1.6 inches (4 cm) in length. It had a dark body with a slight blue tint, although the median fins were lemon yellow. The scales were strongly crosshatched, and the dorsal fin had a dark stripe along its edge. The species' exact diet is not known, but other poeciliids typically eat insect larvae and other small invertebrates. The fish were live bearing and were known to give birth to a few dozen young at a time.

== Habitat ==
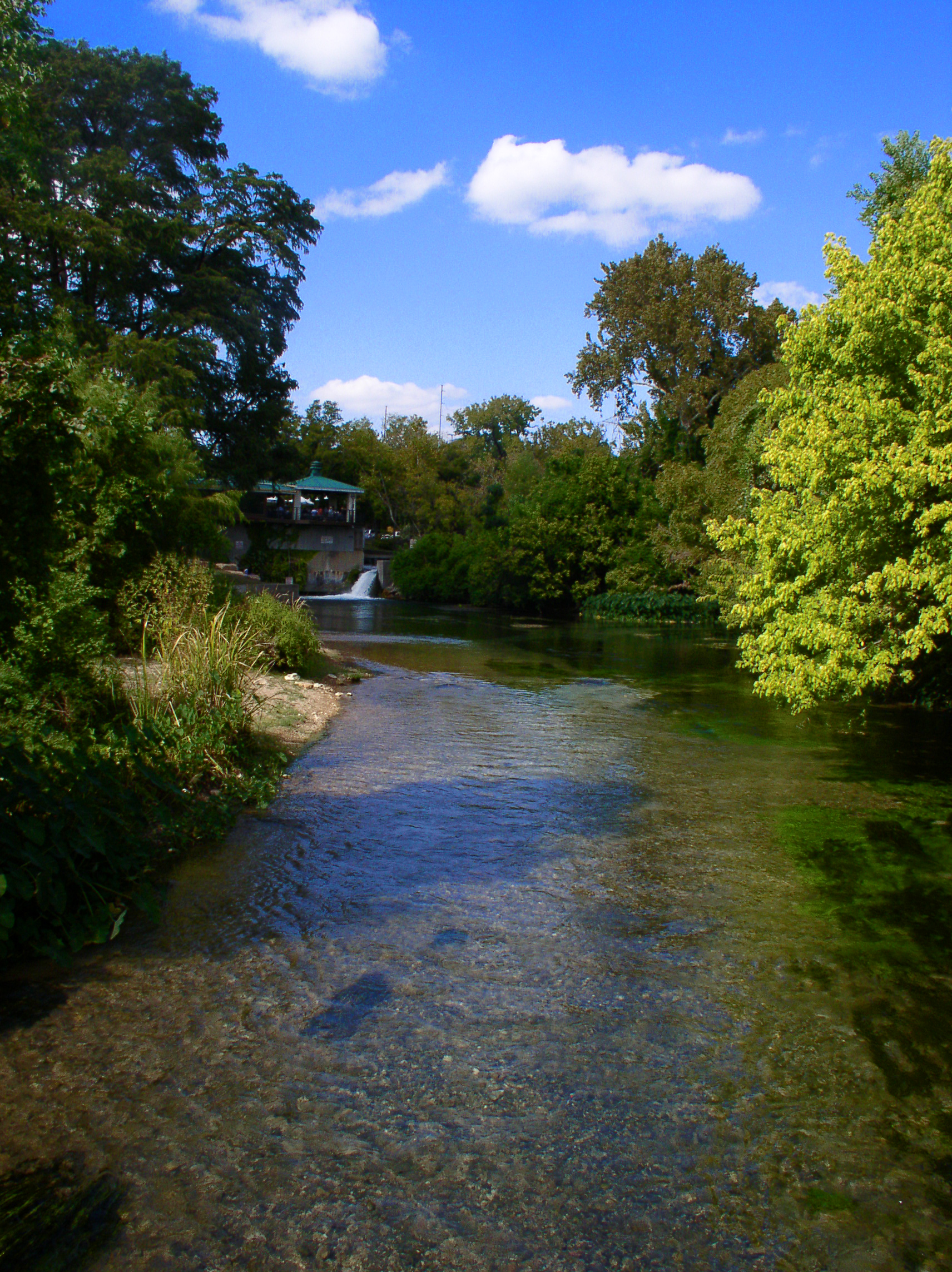
Downstream from the headwaters of the San Marcos Springs, Aquarena Springs, and Spring Lake

The San Marcos gambusia has only been identified in a 0.6-mile (1-km) stretch of the headwaters of the San Marcos River. They appeared to need clean and clear water, with little temperature variability. They apparently also preferred shallow, quiet water, along with partial shade.

== Extinction ==
As of 1969, the population was less than 1,000 individuals. The species was threatened by reduced spring flows and pollution, including sprayed herbicide along the river and introduced fish (Gambusia affinis) and plants (Colocasia esculenta). There have been no specimen sightings since 1983 and was proposed to be delisted from the Endangered Species Act in 2021. The US Fish and Wildlife Service delisted the species effective November 16, 2023.
