= Comal River =

River in Texas, United States

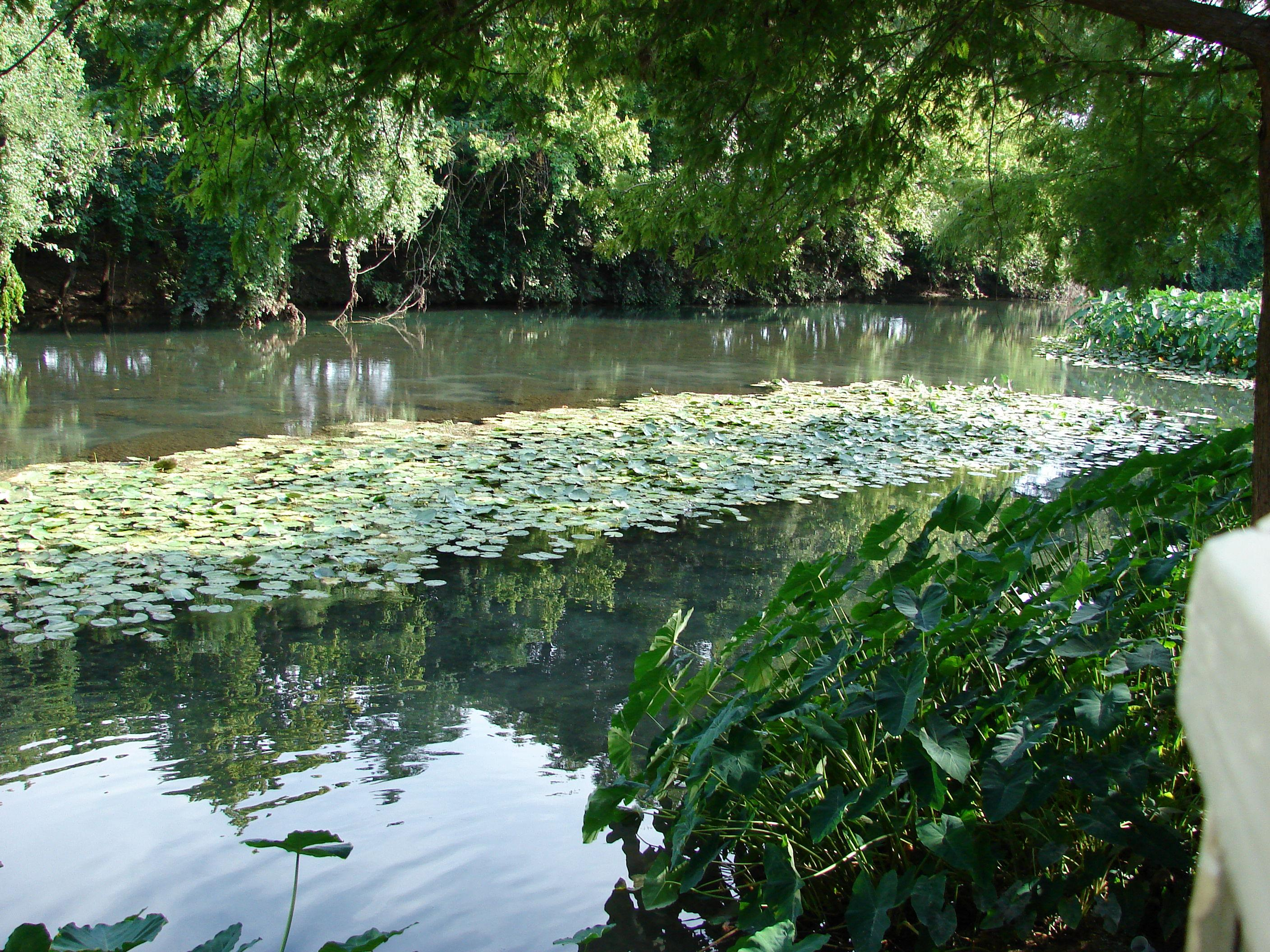
- The Comal River in New Braunfels
- Location of the Comal River

Location
- Country: United States
- State: Texas

Physical characteristics
- Source: Comal Springs
  - location: New Braunfels, Comal County
  - coordinates: 29°42′46.62″N 98°8′15″W
  - elevation: 645 ft (197 m)
- Mouth: Guadalupe River
  - location: New Braunfels, Comal County
  - coordinates: 29°42′16″N 98°6′50″W
  - elevation: 600 ft (180 m)
- Length: 2.5 mi (4.0 km)
- Basin size: 130 sq mi (340 km^{2})
- Discharge
  - average: 312 cu ft/s (8.8 m^{3}/s)

The Comal River (/ˈkoʊmæl/ KOH-mal) is the shortest navigable river in the state of Texas in the United States. Proclaimed the "longest shortest river in the world" by locals, it runs entirely within the city limits of New Braunfels in southeast Comal County. It is a tributary of the Guadalupe River. The Comal begins at Comal Springs in Landa Park and flows 2.5 miles (4.0 km) until its junction with the Guadalupe.

The Comal was originally called the Little Guadalupe in early Spanish accounts. After Spaniard Pedro de Rivera y Villalón identified the longer river as the Guadalupe in 1727, the Comal was given its current name. The name means "basin" or "flat dish" in Spanish.

Historically, the Comal was used to power watermills and cotton gins by early German settlers, and later to provide hydroelectric power. The river is primarily used for water recreation today, being the location of the original Schlitterbahn water amusement park. The water is administered by the Guadalupe-Blanco River Authority. The river is also one of only two rivers to contain the fountain darter (Etheostoma fonticola), a fish now in danger of extinction, with the other being the nearby San Marcos River.

== Recreation ==
Mild currents, clear water, and a host of lost items left behind by tubers make the river a common locale for scuba diving. Because the Comal maintains a temperature around 72 °F (22 °C) year round, divers are present in both the summer and the winter. Thousands of people tube down the Comal River in the spring and summer. Tubing on the Comal provides a less intense alternative to tubing on the nearby Guadalupe River, where one may encounter frequent rapids and boulders to paddle around. The Schlitterbahn Water Park is built on a 70-acre (280,000 m^{2}) tract adjacent to the river.

== See also ==
- List of rivers of Texas
