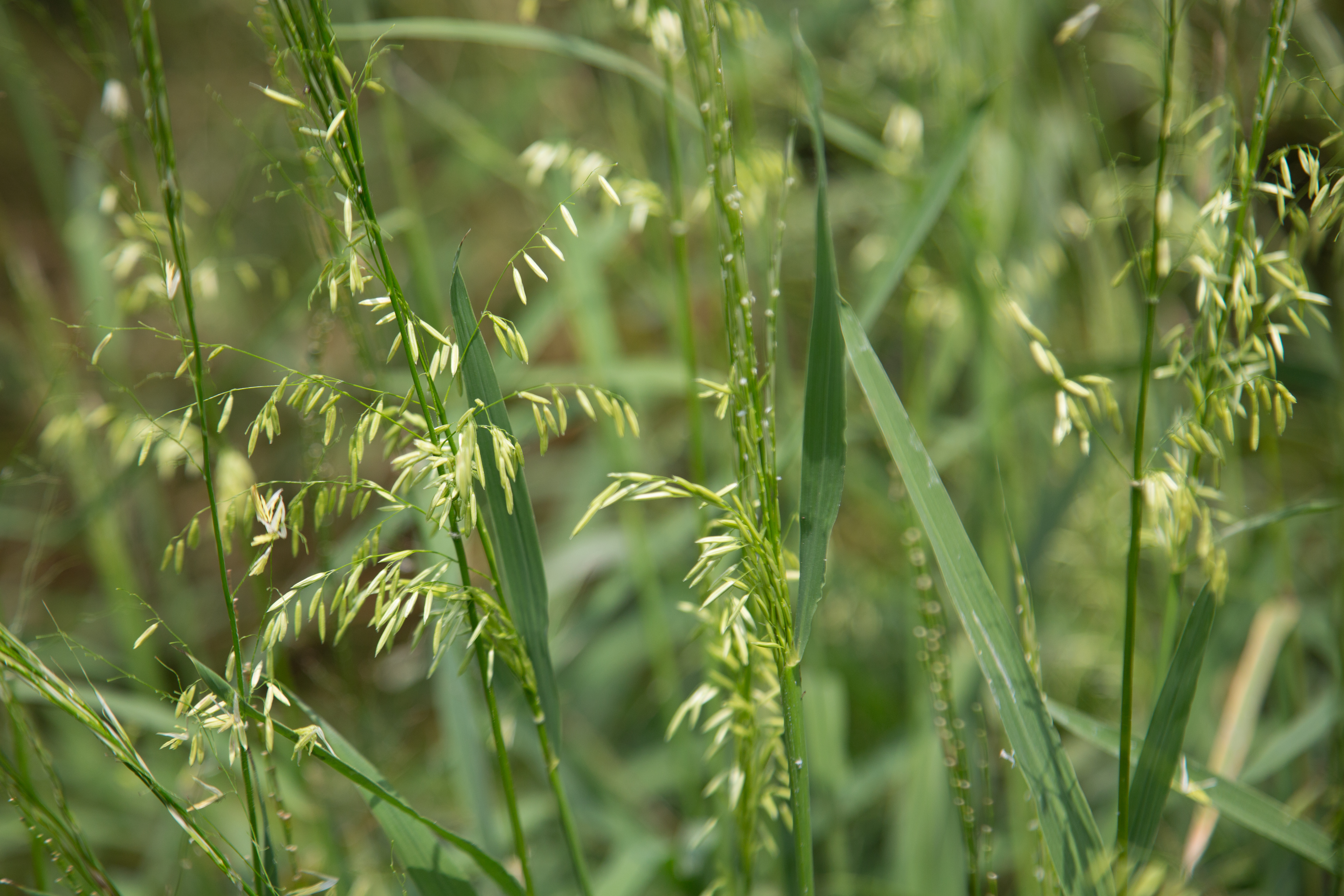

Conservation status
- Critically Imperiled (NatureServe)

- Endangered (ESA)

Scientific classification
- Kingdom: Plantae
- Clade: Embryophytes
- Clade: Tracheophytes
- Clade: Angiosperms
- Clade: Monocots
- Clade: Commelinids
- Order: Poales
- Family: Poaceae
- Genus: Zizania
- Species: Z. texana

Binomial name
- Zizania texana Hitchc.

= Zizania texana =

Species of grass

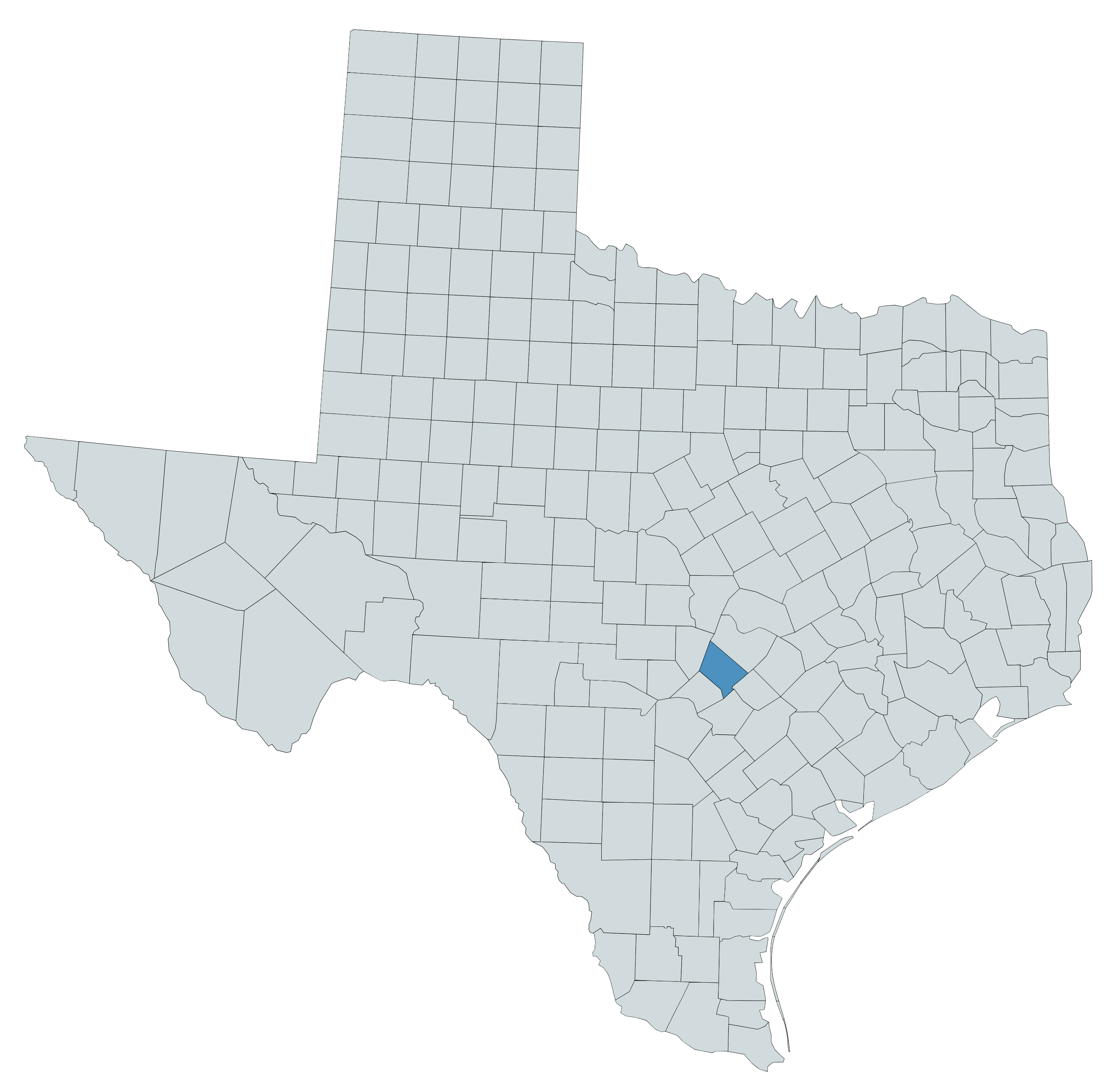
Range of Zizania texana

Zizania texana is a rare species of grass known by the common name Texas wild rice. It is endemic to Texas, where it is found only on the upper San Marcos River in Hays County. It is threatened by the loss and degradation of its habitat. It is a federally listed endangered species of the United States.

== Information ==
This grass, a member of the same genus as commercially sold wild rice, is an aquatic plant that grows in the water with only its stem tips rising above the surface. It grows 1 to 2 metres (3.3 to 6.6 ft) long but the stems have been known to reach 5 metres (16 ft) in length. The ribbon-like leaves are up to a meter (3.3 ft) in length. The inflorescence is a panicle up to 31 centimetres (12 in) long by 10 centimetres (3.9 in) wide. The male spikelet is somewhat oval in shape and the female is lance-shaped with a long awn which may be a few centimeters in length. The male and female flowers are on different branches of the panicle. Pollen is carried to other plants by wind. The plant can asexually propagate by cloning and sometimes forms mats of cloned stems.

This plant is limited to the first two miles of the San Marcos River in Texas. There are 140 clumps of stems in this population. It covered over 10,000 square metres (110,000 ft^{2}) in 2008 and is reportedly growing exponentially from plantings. There is also an introduced population at Spring Lake at the San Marcos Springs and a number of specimens are kept in an enclosure on the Texas State University campus. The natural habitat of the grass is the clear water of the San Marcos River, which is fed by springs originating in the Edwards Aquifer. The grass occurs in a relatively narrow range of water conditions, including temperature, pH, and turbidity, flow rates, and substrate types.

This plant was once locally common in the area, growing thick enough to become a nuisance as recently as the 1930s. It has been reduced to its rare status because the Edwards Aquifer has been drained of its water for use in agriculture and other industries, lowering the flow on San Marcos River. The rare plant continues to be threatened by reductions to the aquifer, and is also threatened by recreational activities on the river and by nutria, an introduced mammal. Stems are broken, bent, or submerged by floating debris, including masses of vegetation mowed upstream and sent floating.

The grass is inefficient in reproduction. It rarely accomplishes successful sexual reproduction. Pollen is released for a short time each day, typically only between 2 and 4 am. It is sometimes released a second time around 9 am. Within a few minutes the pollen loses its viability and it becomes nonfunctional within one hour. Because the pollen is carried on the wind, the inflorescence must rise above the surface of the water; the stem cannot be broken or submerged. Pollen generally moves less than one meter (3.3 ft) from its parent inflorescence, so plants must be close together to reproduce and cannot be isolated. Today the plant is rare and the population is fragmented, making it difficult for the pollen to reach a receptive flower. The male flowers of the grass do not pollinate the female flowers on the same inflorescence because they do not release pollen at the same time the female flowers are receptive. The grass can also reproduce vegetatively by producing tillers. Tillers can break off and root to produce new stems, but these will be genetically identical to the parent plant.
