= San Marcos River =

San Marcos River Río San Marcos
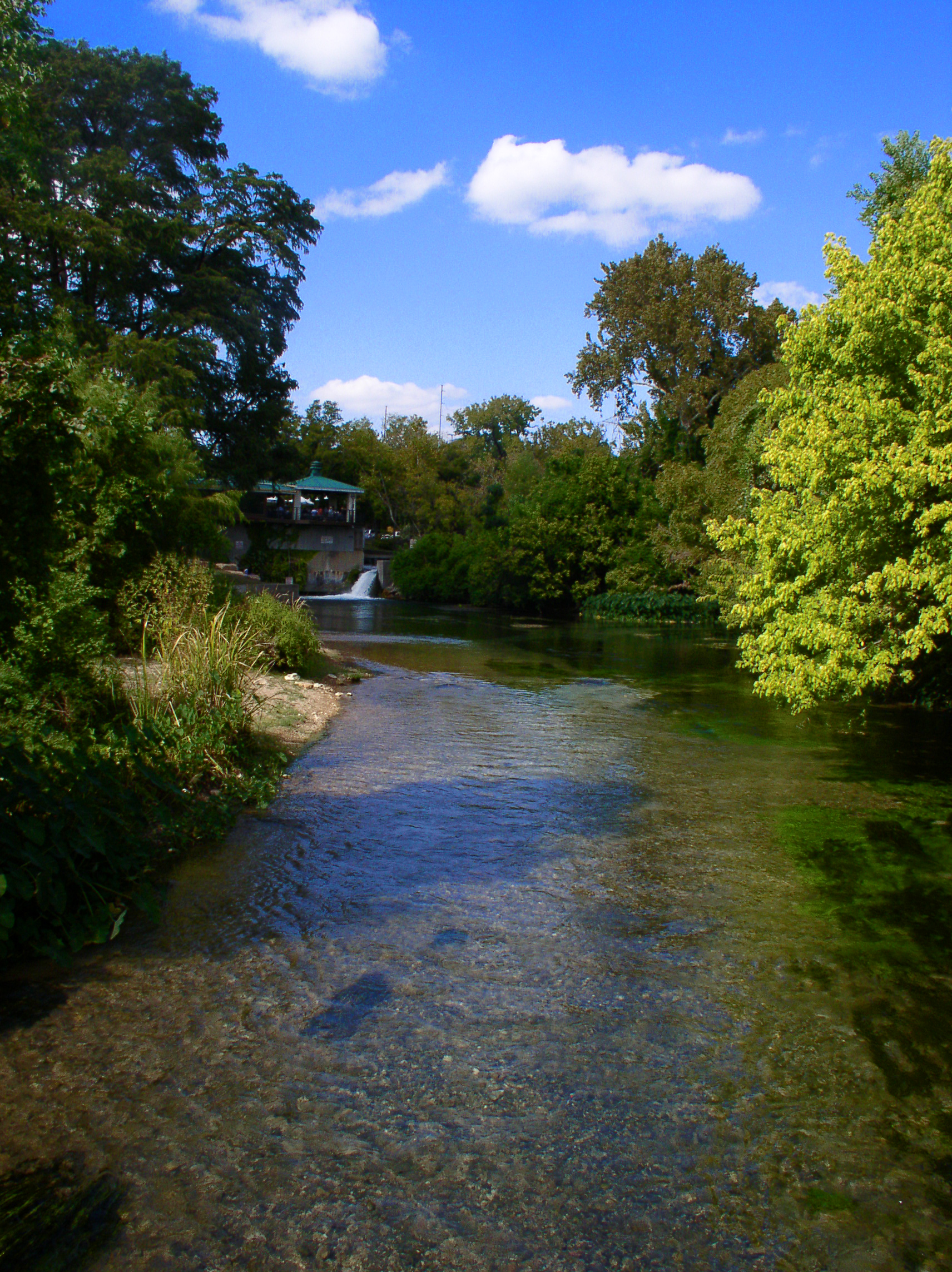
- The San Marcos River downstream from the San Marcos Springs
- Map of the San Marcos River

Location
- Country: United States
- State: Texas

Physical characteristics
- Source: San Marcos Springs
  - location: San Marcos, Texas, U.S.
  - elevation: 575 ft (175 m)
- Mouth: Guadalupe River
  - location: Gonzales County, Texas, U.S. Hays County, Texas, U.S.
  - coordinates: 29.49095°N 97.47107°W
- Length: 75 mi (121 km)
- Basin size: 522 sq mi (1,350 km^{2})
- Discharge
  - average: 236 cu ft/s (6.7 m^{3}/s)

The San Marcos River rises from the San Marcos Springs, the location of the Meadows Center for Water and the Environment (formerly Aquarena Springs), in San Marcos, Texas. The springs are home to several threatened or endangered species, including the Texas blind salamander, fountain darter, and Texas wild rice. The river is a popular recreational area, and is frequented for tubing, canoeing, swimming, and fishing.

== Course ==
The river begins at San Marcos Springs, rising from the Edwards Aquifer into Spring Lake. Access to much of the headwaters is restricted because of the delicate ecosystem and numerous rare species. The upper river flows through San Marcos, and is a popular recreational area. It is joined by the Blanco River after four miles, and passes through Luling and Palmetto State Park. Near Gonzales, it flows into the Guadalupe River after a total of 75 miles (121 km). This course is the first section of the Texas Water Safari.

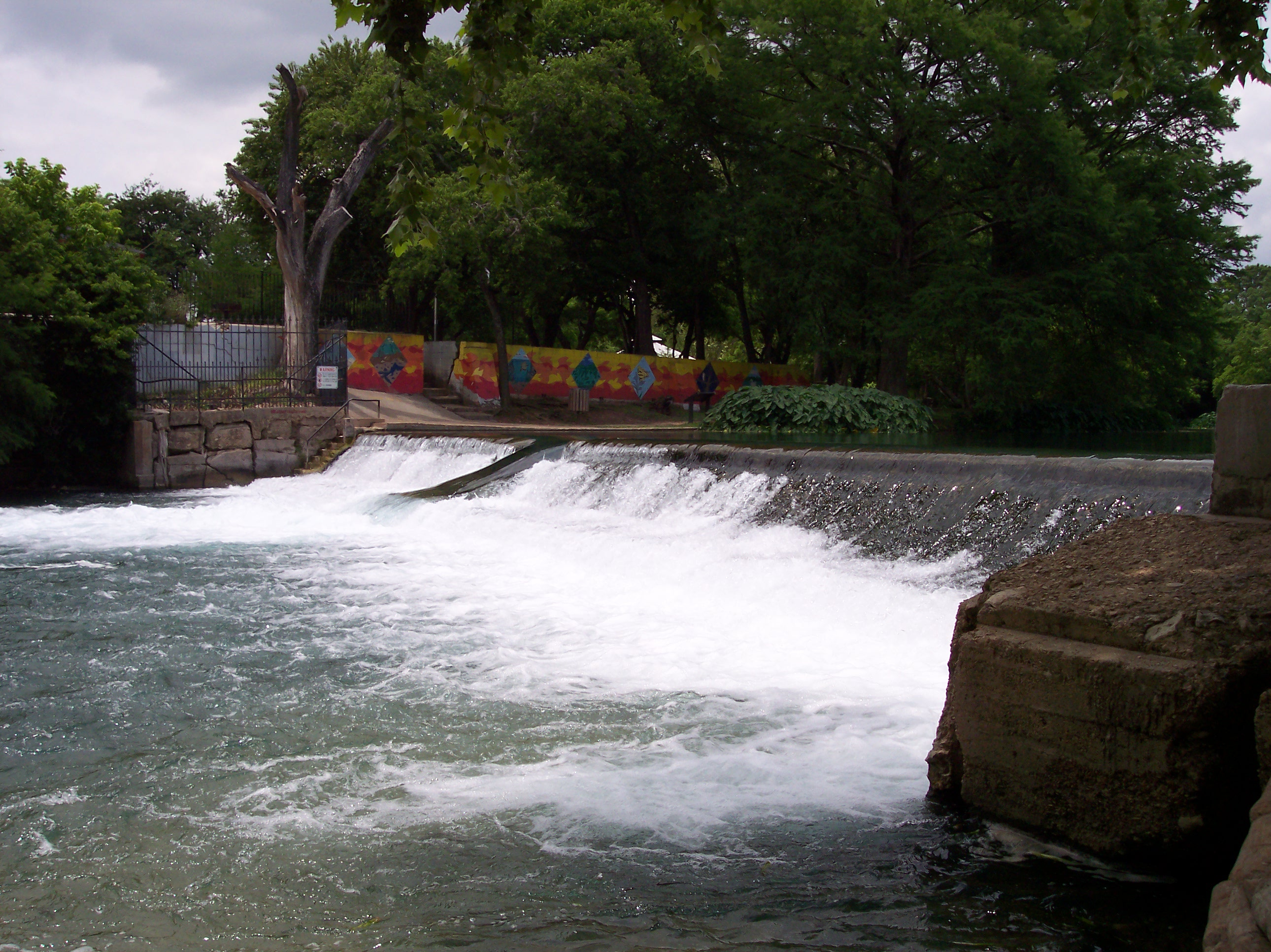
The old Rio Vista Dam, now demolished: The area was transformed into three rapids, making it a very popular recreational area

== History ==
The history and naming of the river is somewhat unclear. It may have been discovered by Alonso de León's expedition in 1689, but some scholars believe they instead had found the Colorado or Navidad Rivers. The convention came to call the first sizable river beyond the Guadalupe, but at the time, the Comal River was often called the Guadalupe, and part of the Guadalupe often called San Ybón. In 1808, the Spanish established San Marcos de Neve, just south of present-day San Marcos. They had friendly relations with the Tonkawa Indians, but the hostile Comanche tribe forced them to leave in 1812. In 1998 and 2015, the river was affected by severe flooding.

== Events ==
San Marcos hosts many events on the San Marcos River. The Texas Water Safari event has run every year since 1963; it uses canoes powered only by human muscle. This event uses the San Marcos River and the Guadalupe River, spanning from Aquarena Springs in San Marcos to Seadrift, Texas, a total of 260 miles. This event is actually composed of many parts, including an information seminar, the safari race, a preliminary race, and another short race. Racers must take enough food and provisions to last them the distance of the race. The Texas Water Safari is billed as the "World's Toughest Boat Race" and runs annually on the second Saturday of June.

Another event is the San Marcos River annual San Marcos River Clean-Up, which is an organized spring clean-up of the whole river. Volunteers can either clean debris around the river with the use of canoes, or cook food for the San Marcos River Clean-Up thank-you dinner that is provided for all volunteers. The clean-up is coordinated yearly by Tom Goynes, president of the Texas River Protection Association, and is usually the first Saturday of every March.

== Wildlife ==
San Marcos has many different wildlife species, including endangered ones, that reside in the San Marcos River. Species are listed threatened or endangered based on declining numbers or loss of habitat. The Texas blind salamander and the San Marcos salamander are endangered species that are only found in certain section of the San Marcos River and the Edwards Aquifer.

Other endangered species include the fountain darter and San Marcos gambusia, which reside in the San Marcos River. The fountain darter is characterized by the mottled brown body and dark markings that help it camouflage into the bottom of the San Marcos River banks. It has a growing population and flourishes in the San Marcos River. The San Marcos gambusia is characterized by prominent dark stripes along its body. Its population is unknown, as no samples have been collected since 1983, and is even considered to be extinct. Both fish require clear, clean, continually flowing water with a stable temperature.

An endangered plant species specific to the San Marcos River is Texas wild rice. Only 230 clumps still remain on the river in two different populations, with one population being grown on the Texas State University campus.

The San Marcos River is considered to be one of the most biologically diverse aquatic ecosystems known in the Southwestern United States. Consequently, the United States Fish and Wildlife Service and Texas Parks and Wildlife Department have designated the San Marcos Springs and Spring Lake critical habitat, so some parts of the river are privatized. Critical habitat refers to a particular geographical area that contains all of the physical, chemical and biological attributes needed for the continued success of an endangered plant or animal and that may require special efforts for their management and protection.

== Restoration efforts ==
Much of the San Marcos River is protected by the Edwards Aquifer habitat conservation plan due to the wildlife that reside in or near the river. This plan was established in 2006 as an attempt between several Texas cities that use the many resources of the San Marcos River to manage aquatic habitats and water resources of the Comal and San Marcos springs. This plan helps manage control of non-native species, species stability, control of native species, sediment removal, reduction of contamination, and flow protection. Work on the San Marcos River banks are the main focus of the restoration projects in a large effort to protect the Edward Aquifer. Non-native plants are uprooted and new plants are planted to take their spots. Also, six new access points were to be added to the river in attempts to allow people to get in and out of the water without harm to the river banks. The city was to spend close to $1 million in this restoration attempt, to makes the river a more ideal habitat, while at the same time improving recreation.

== See also ==
- List of rivers of Texas
