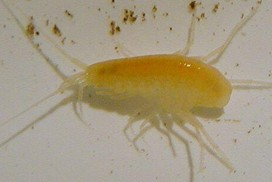

Conservation status
- Endangered (IUCN 3.1)

- Critically Imperiled (NatureServe)

Scientific classification
- Kingdom: Animalia
- Phylum: Arthropoda
- Class: Malacostraca
- Order: Amphipoda
- Family: Crangonyctidae
- Genus: Stygobromus
- Species: S. pecki

Binomial name
- Stygobromus pecki (Holsinger, 1967)

= Stygobromus pecki =

Peck's cave amphipod

Species of crustacean

Stygobromus pecki, the Peck's cave amphipod, is a rare species of crustacean found in four cavern areas of southwestern Texas (Comal Springs, Hueco Springs, Landa Park, and Panther Canyon) in the United States. It is a federally listed endangered species in the United States and is also listed as Endangered on the IUCN Red List. Because of the species' limited geographical distribution, not much information on S. pecki is known. As of April 2022, there is no available 5-year review, Species Status Assessment, or recovery plan for the species. However, the Edwards' Aquifer Habitat Conservation Program (EAHCP), with the support of the U.S. Fish and Wildlife Service (UFWS), has been attempting to further study and promote conservation of S. pecki.

== Description ==
Stygobromus pecki is a small, aquatic organism reaching up to 10.5 millimetres (0.41 in) in length. Although the length of individuals may vary, most are usually less than 5 millimetres (0.20 in) long. It is eyeless and unpigmented, as are all the genus Stygobromus. The amphipod has five pairs of legs, two pairs of antennae, and a laterally flattened body. Though most are uncolored, some populations in the Comal Springs have been found to have an orange hue, linked to their food intake. The S. pecki collected from Hueco springs were found to be white. The color of some amphipods is often dependent on their diet, which includes carotenoids produced by plants, algae, and likely bacteria. It is possible that the particular orange coloration found within the Comal Springs population of S. pecki is derived from food sources such as leaf litter that are scarce in the Hueco Springs region.

== Life history ==
Though the life history of S. pecki is unknown, most amphipod species complete their life cycle (from egg to adult) in one year. The average female S. pecki lays approximately 5 eggs with a mean incubation time of 50 days. Females can have broods of 10 young each, with the neonates being about 2 mm in length upon hatching. They were found to reach 9 mm in 14 months, producing offspring in the following year. Amphipods are also susceptible to environmental sex determination, putting them more at risk to the adverse effects of chemical pollutants. The life span of S. pecki is unknown, though wild-caught adults have been reared in captivity for at least 2.7 years.

== Ecology ==
=== Diet ===
S. pecki is known to be an opportunistic feeder, meaning that it feeds on a large variety of prey and have the ability to adapt to whichever foods are available. Generally, its diet consists of bacterial biofilm, debris, and smaller invertebrates. As mentioned earlier, the diet of S. pecki has a great influence on body color, which can range from white to orange depending on the carotenoids ingested. Researchers have also recently discovered that ostracods, seed shrimp found attached to leaves, make up part of the S. pecki diet.

=== Behavior ===
Though the specific behavior of S. pecki is largely unknown, most amphipods are scavengers, generally feeding on algae, omnivores, or small insects. The front two pairs of legs are used to capture food and aided with the use of their claws. Since algal availability changes throughout the year in certain communities, the evolution of certain feeding methods, such as compensatory feeding, may have increased survival of amphipods.

S. pecki are light sensitive, meaning that they very rarely leave the subterranean habitat in which they reside. Since S. pecki live in subterranean habitats, they are hypogeal organisms and have evolved a variety of behavioral, physiological, and metabolic adaptations. These adaptations have allowed them to withstand long periods of resource shortages and show high starvation resistance in the low energy habitats.

=== Habitat ===
S. pecki primarily reside in spaces of hollowed out limestone found in spring underground aquifers. These spaces provide zones of permanent darkness that this species prefers as a result of its light sensitivity, though they have been found to occasionally rise to the surface in areas around spring openings. Gravel, rocks, and associated debris (leaves, roots, and wood) have been found directly in or near springs, seeps, and upwellings of Comal Springs and Landa Lake. The debris would provide S. pecki with food and may help explain the localization of the species.

Because S. pecki has only been found near or within spring systems, it is likely a phreatobite and does not disperse well in downstream gravel beds. To move between caves and springs, they likely follow underground water connections between the locations.

=== Range ===
S. pecki have been found in Comal Springs, Hueco Springs, Landa Park, and Panther Canyon in New Braunfels, Texas. The species is thought to be limited to this area of Texas. Though no information is available regarding species abundance at Landa Park and Panther Canyon, most collections of the species have been found at Comal Springs, and one individual was found in Hueco Springs in 1992.

== Conservation ==
=== Population size ===
Only four individuals of S. pecki have been found in Miller's Cave and two individuals from Thompsons Meadow Spring aquifer have been reported since their listing as an endangered species. From this distribution information, it can be concluded that large populations of the species are probably not present.

=== Past and current geographical distribution ===
It is unknown whether the species historically inhabited other surrounding springs that are now almost dried out, such as San Pedro Springs and San Antonio Springs. This suggests that the range of S. pecki has likely contracted as a result of this loss of freshwater spring habitat.

=== Major threats ===
This species is threatened by lowering water levels in the Edwards Aquifer, which feeds the S. pecki inhabited springs. The water in the aquifer has long been drained for a variety of human uses, such as irrigation. Other threats include increased urbanization in surrounding areas, which results in flooding, erosion, increased levels of agricultural and storm water runoff, and siltation. Competition for food, destruction of aquatic vegetation, and general habitat degradation have also resulted in this species being at risk of extinction.

=== Listing under the ESA ===
S. pecki is listed as an endangered species under the ESA, meaning that it is considered to be at risk of extinction.

=== 5-year review ===
As of April of 2022, there is no available 5-year review for S. pecki according to the Environmental Conservation Online System (ECOS).

=== Species Status Assessment ===
As of April of 2022, there is currently no available Species Status Assessment for S. pecki according to the Environmental Conservation Online System (ECOS).

=== Recovery plan ===
No recovery plan exists as of April of 2022, but for the population under Edwards' Aquifer, the Edwards' Aquifer Habitat Conservation Program (EAHCP) has worked to recover the species through protecting and assessing the health of S. pecki. The EAHCP is a comprehensive regional plan that outlines protection strategies for threatened and endangered species in the Edwards Aquifer, Comal springs, and San Marcos springs areas in Central Texas.
