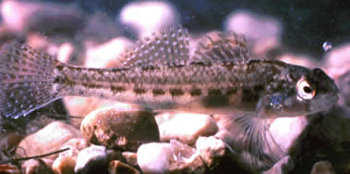

Conservation status
- Endangered (IUCN 3.1)

- Endangered (ESA)

Scientific classification
- Kingdom: Animalia
- Phylum: Chordata
- Class: Actinopterygii
- Order: Perciformes
- Family: Percidae
- Genus: Etheostoma
- Species: E. fonticola

Binomial name
- Etheostoma fonticola (D. S. Jordan & C. H. Gilbert, 1886)

Synonyms
- Alvarius fonticola D. S. Jordan & C. H. Gilbert, 1886

= Fountain darter =

Species of fish

The fountain darter (Etheostoma fonticola) is a species of freshwater ray-finned fish, a darter from the subfamily Etheostomatinae, part of the family Percidae, which also contains the perches, ruffes, and pikeperches. It is found in the headwaters of only two rivers in Texas, United States, the Comal River, and the San Marcos River. It is generally smaller than 3 cm (1.2 in) long and feeds on small invertebrates. It is a federally listed endangered species of the United States and is also listed as endangered by the IUCN.

== Distribution and habitat ==
The fountain darter is known from only two locations, primarily the headwaters of the spring-fed San Marcos River, having been observed as far as 1.25 miles downstream, as well as the upper reaches of the Comal River in central Texas. Its geographic isolation is reflective of its incredibly specific habitation preferences, which demand conditions that can only be found in these two Texas river headwaters. In these unique locations, they can be observed in open areas created by a medium current at depths of 3–5 feet near the outlets of contributing spring heads with rates of flow low enough to retain a layer of percolating sand. These springs can be found adjacent to the main springs that deliver the tremendous volumes of cool, clear water that form each river. They require a stable water temperature, within the low 70s °F, year-round, which the springs provide.

The population in the Comal River was extirpated due to spring failure in the 1950s. The current population there is the result of reintroduction in the early 1970s.

== Behavior ==
The fountain darter feeds on small invertebrates. It breeds all year round, and the eggs are deposited on dead leaves, stems, rocks, algae, or other objects. This fish lives for one to two years.

== Status ==
They primarily occupy the sandy tops of lesser-flowing springheads or flat rock surfaces absent of rooted plants or decaying plant matter, and spawn within the vibrantly abundant and healthy vegetation that thrives in these unique, pristine, spring-fed river systems. An extra worry for the future of fountain darters is the parasitic, non-native trematode (Centrocestus formosanus), whose impact on the darter population is not yet known. As of 2011, only the Comal population is seriously affected by the parasite. The National Fish Hatchery and Technology Center in San Marcos keeps a reserve population of 500 adults as a hedge against a man-made or natural event wiping out the fish in the wild. The IUCN rates this species as "endangered". Conservation efforts include encouraging people to use less water to maximize water flow from the springs and to keep the rivers free from trash. The continued survival of wild fountain darters is dependent upon the integrity of the subterranean Edwards Aquifer.
