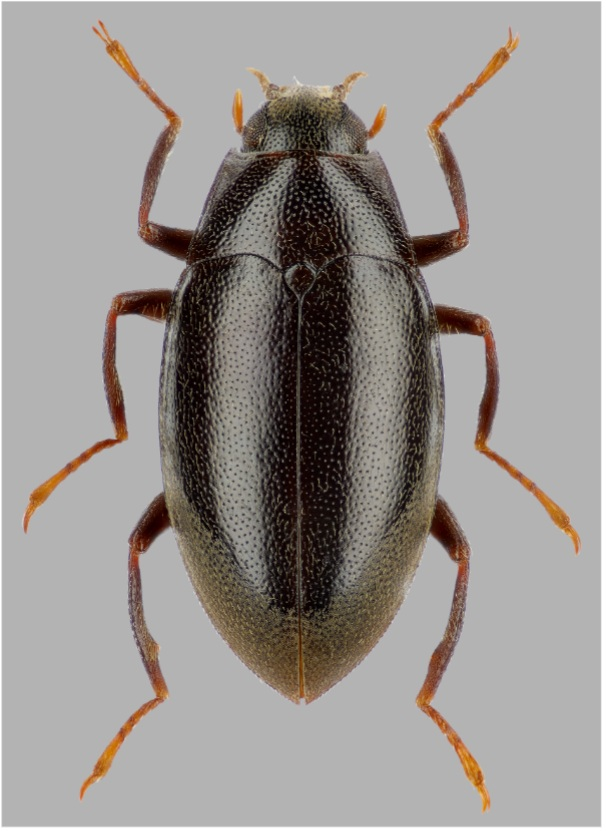

Scientific classification
- Kingdom: Animalia
- Phylum: Arthropoda
- Class: Insecta
- Order: Coleoptera
- Suborder: Polyphaga
- Infraorder: Elateriformia
- Family: Dryopidae
- Genus: Elmomorphus
- Species: E. similis

Binomial name
- Elmomorphus similis Kodada, Selnekovič & Jäch, 2024

= Elmomorphus similis =

Species of beetle

Elmomorphus similis is a species of beetle of the family Dryopidae. This species is found in China (Guangdong, Yunnan), Laos and Vietnam.

== Description ==
Adults reach a length of 2.94–3.33 mm (males) and 2.81–3.32 mm (females). Their body is oblong oval, moderately convex dorsally and integument dark brown to black, while the mouthparts and antennae are light reddish brown and the legs dark reddish-brown.

== Etymology ==
The species name refers to the overall similarity of this species with Elmomorphus dentipes and Elmomorphus curvipes.
