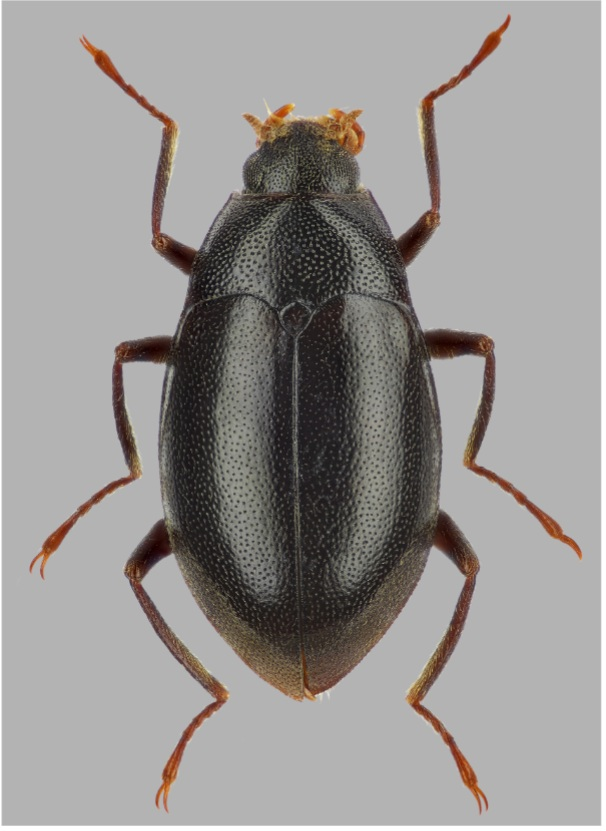

Scientific classification
- Kingdom: Animalia
- Phylum: Arthropoda
- Class: Insecta
- Order: Coleoptera
- Suborder: Polyphaga
- Infraorder: Elateriformia
- Family: Dryopidae
- Genus: Elmomorphus
- Species: E. paradonatus

Binomial name
- Elmomorphus paradonatus Kodada, Selnekovič & Jäch, 2024

= Elmomorphus paradonatus =

Species of beetle

Elmomorphus paradonatus is a species of beetle of the family Dryopidae. This species is found in China (Guizhou, Yunnan).

== Description ==
Adults reach a length of 2.97–3.58 mm (males) and 3.14–3.79 mm (females). Their body is ovate, strongly convex dorsally and integument dark brown to black. The mouthparts, antennae, trochanters, and tarsi are reddish-brown.

== Etymology ==
The species name refers to the morphological similarity of the species with Elmomorphus donatus.
