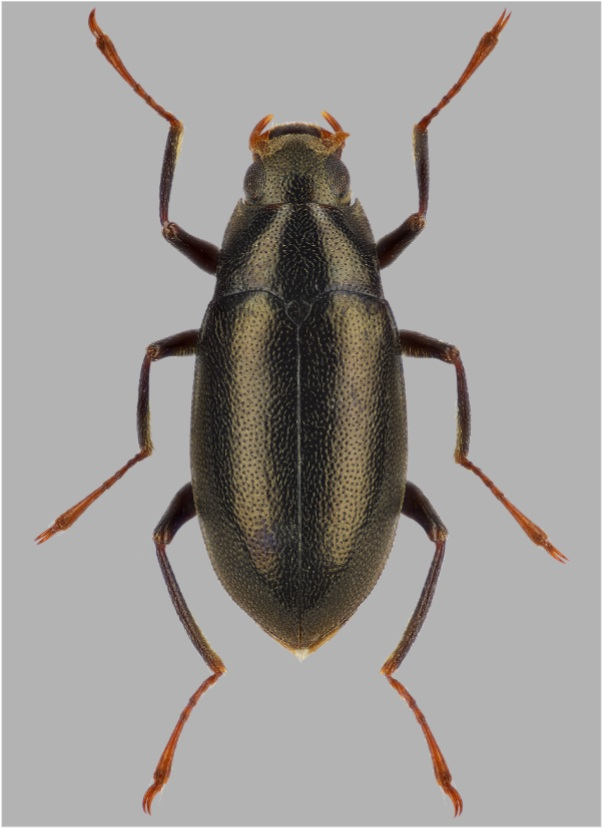

Scientific classification
- Kingdom: Animalia
- Phylum: Arthropoda
- Class: Insecta
- Order: Coleoptera
- Suborder: Polyphaga
- Infraorder: Elateriformia
- Family: Dryopidae
- Genus: Elmomorphus
- Species: E. paramontanus

Binomial name
- Elmomorphus paramontanus Selnekovič, Jäch & Kodada, 2024

= Elmomorphus paramontanus =

Species of beetle

Elmomorphus paramontanus is a species of beetle of the family Dryopidae. This species is found in China (Guangdong, Hong Kong, Yunnan), Laos, Malaysia (Perak), Myanmar, Thailand and Vietnam.

== Description ==
Adults reach a length of 2.90–3.33 mm (males) and 2.88–3.35 mm (females). Their body is oblong-ovate, dorsally convex and integument black, while the mouthparts, antennae, trochanters, basal parts of the femora, and tarsi are reddish-brown. The dorsum has a fine bronze metallic lustre.

== Etymology ==
The species name refers to the overall similarity with Elmomorphus montanus.
