= Helichus naviculus =

Scientific classification
- Kingdom: Animalia
- Phylum: Arthropoda
- Class: Insecta
- Order: Coleoptera
- Suborder: Polyphaga
- Infraorder: Elateriformia
- Family: Dryopidae
- Genus: Helichus
- Species: H. naviculus

Binomial name
- Helichus naviculus Delève, 1973

Species of beetle

Helichus naviculus, is a species of long-toed water beetle found in Sri Lanka. Larva can be found under stones in the cascades in freshwater.
