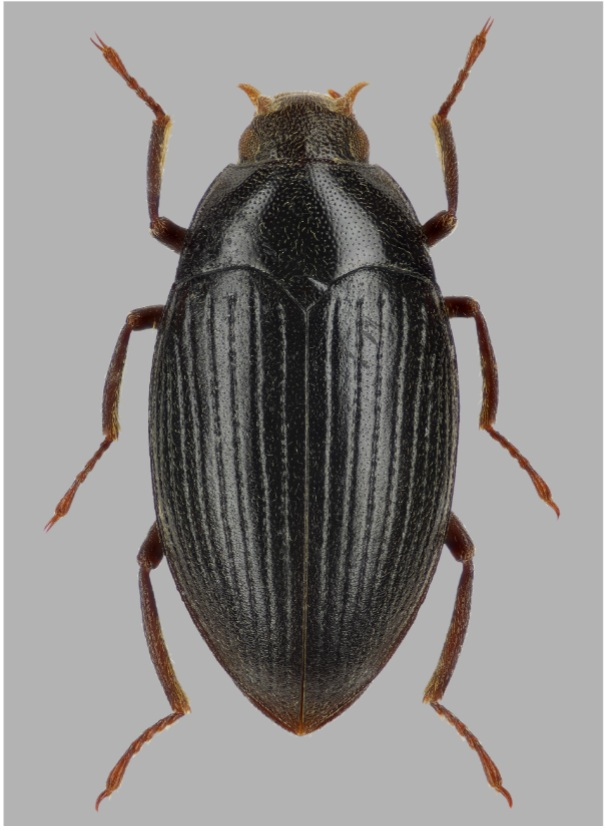

Scientific classification
- Kingdom: Animalia
- Phylum: Arthropoda
- Class: Insecta
- Order: Coleoptera
- Suborder: Polyphaga
- Infraorder: Elateriformia
- Family: Dryopidae
- Genus: Elmomorphus
- Species: E. jii

Binomial name
- Elmomorphus jii Kodada, Selnekovič & Jäch, 2024

= Elmomorphus jii =

Species of beetle

Elmomorphus jii is a species of beetle of the family Dryopidae. This species is found in China (Hunan).

== Description ==
Adults reach a length of 3.72 mm (males) and 4.05–4.13 mm (females). Their body is oval, moderately convex dorsally and integument black. The mouthparts, antennae, and legs are reddish brown.

== Etymology ==
The species name honours Prof. Lanzhu Ji, a Chinese entomologist who collected the holotype.
