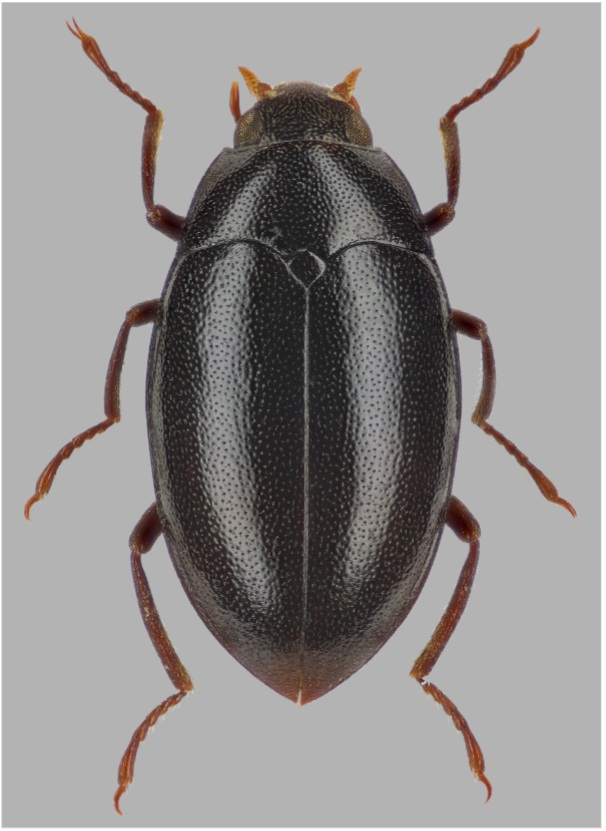

Scientific classification
- Kingdom: Animalia
- Phylum: Arthropoda
- Class: Insecta
- Order: Coleoptera
- Suborder: Polyphaga
- Infraorder: Elateriformia
- Family: Dryopidae
- Genus: Elmomorphus
- Species: E. simplex

Binomial name
- Elmomorphus simplex Kodada, Selnekovič & Jäch, 2024

= Elmomorphus simplex =

Species of beetle

Elmomorphus simplex is a species of beetle of the family Dryopidae. This species is found in China (Fujian, Hunan, Jiangxi, Zhejiang).

== Description ==
Adults reach a length of 3.36–3.89 mm (males) and 3.24–3.96 mm (females). Their body is broadly oval, strongly convex dorsally and integument black. The mouthparts, antennae, trochanters, and tarsi are reddish brown.

== Etymology ==
The species name is derived from Latin simplex (meaning simple) and refers to the simple elytral surface lacking striae and plastron.
