= Postelichus immsi =

Scientific classification
- Domain: Eukaryota
- Kingdom: Animalia
- Phylum: Arthropoda
- Class: Insecta
- Order: Coleoptera
- Suborder: Polyphaga
- Infraorder: Elateriformia
- Family: Dryopidae
- Genus: Postelichus
- Species: P. immsi

Binomial name
- Postelichus immsi (Hinton, 1937)

Synonyms
- Helichus immsi Hinton, 1937

Species of beetle

Postelichus immsi is a species of long-toed water beetle in the family Dryopidae. It is found in North America.
