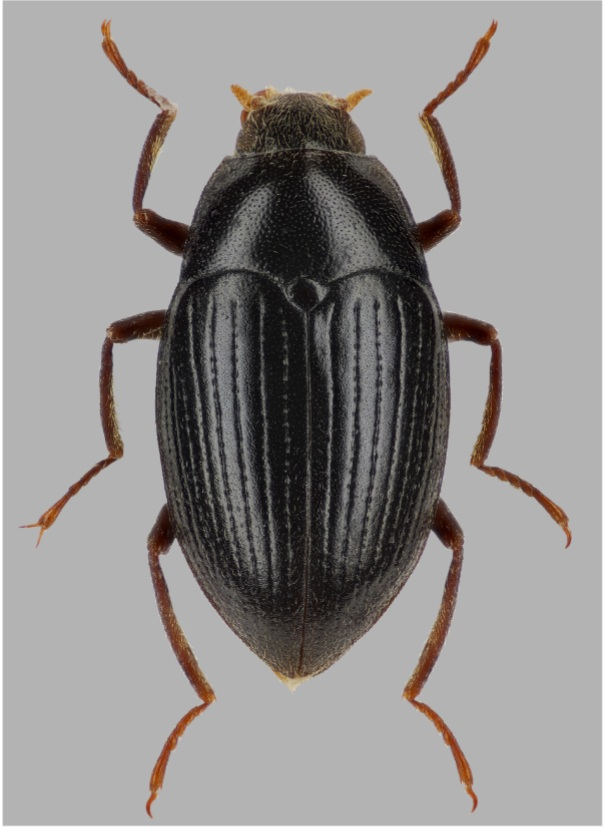

Scientific classification
- Kingdom: Animalia
- Phylum: Arthropoda
- Class: Insecta
- Order: Coleoptera
- Suborder: Polyphaga
- Infraorder: Elateriformia
- Family: Dryopidae
- Genus: Elmomorphus
- Species: E. minutus

Binomial name
- Elmomorphus minutus Kodada, Selnekovič & Jäch, 2024

= Elmomorphus minutus =

Species of beetle

Elmomorphus minutus is a species of beetle of the family Dryopidae. This species is found in China (Yunnan).

== Description ==
Adults reach a length of 2.92–3.27 mm (males) and 3.58 mm (females). Their body is oval, moderately convex and integument black. The mouthparts, antennae, and tarsi are reddish brown and the remaining parts of the legs are brown.

== Etymology ==
The species name is from Latin minutus (meaning small, little) and refers to the small body size.
