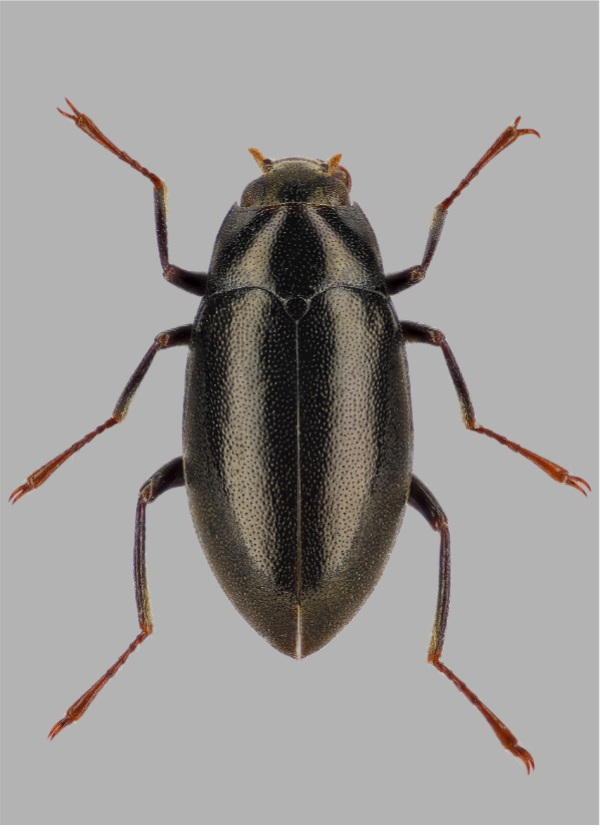

Scientific classification
- Kingdom: Animalia
- Phylum: Arthropoda
- Class: Insecta
- Order: Coleoptera
- Suborder: Polyphaga
- Infraorder: Elateriformia
- Family: Dryopidae
- Genus: Elmomorphus
- Species: E. bispinosus

Binomial name
- Elmomorphus bispinosus Kodada, Selnekovič & Jäch, 2024

= Elmomorphus bispinosus =

Species of beetle

Elmomorphus bispinosus is a species of beetle of the family Dryopidae. This species is found in China (Hunan).

== Description ==
Adults reach a length of 3.38–3.54 mm. Their body is oval and integument black, while the mouthparts, antennae, and tarsi are reddish brown.

== Etymology ==
The species name is Latin and refers to the presence of two spiny microsclerites on the bursa copulatrix.
