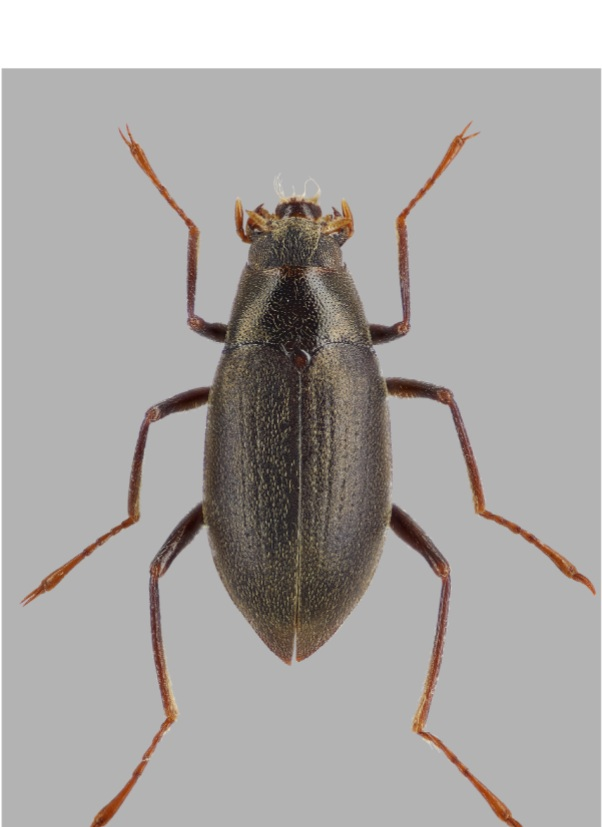

Scientific classification
- Kingdom: Animalia
- Phylum: Arthropoda
- Class: Insecta
- Order: Coleoptera
- Suborder: Polyphaga
- Infraorder: Elateriformia
- Family: Dryopidae
- Genus: Elmomorphus
- Species: E. parabrevicornis

Binomial name
- Elmomorphus parabrevicornis Selnekovič, Jäch & Kodada, 2024

= Elmomorphus parabrevicornis =

Species of beetle

Elmomorphus parabrevicornis is a species of beetle of the Dryopidae family. This species is found in the Fujian, Guangdong, and Hunan provinces of China .

== Description ==
Adults reach a length of 3.04–3.18 mm (0.120–0.125 in) (males) and 3.27–3.47 mm (0.129–0.137 in) (females). Their body is oblong-ovate and dark brown to black, while the mouthparts, antennae and legs are reddish brown.

== Etymology ==
The species name refers to the high morphological similarity with Elmomorphus brevicornis.
