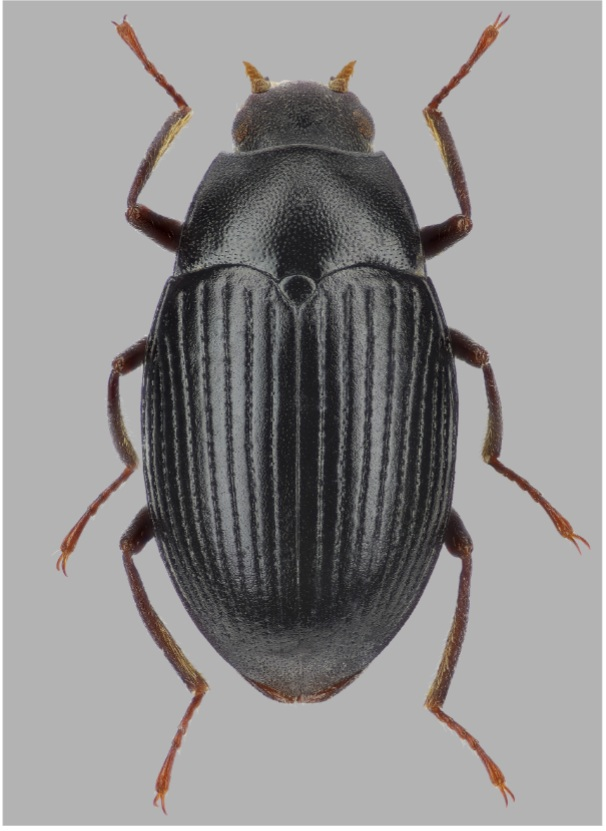

Scientific classification
- Kingdom: Animalia
- Phylum: Arthropoda
- Class: Insecta
- Order: Coleoptera
- Suborder: Polyphaga
- Infraorder: Elateriformia
- Family: Dryopidae
- Genus: Elmomorphus
- Species: E. globosus

Binomial name
- Elmomorphus globosus Kodada, Selnekovič & Jäch, 2024

= Elmomorphus globosus =

Species of beetle

Elmomorphus globosus is a species of beetle of the family Dryopidae. This species is found in China (Guizhou, Hubei, Hunan).

== Description ==
Adults reach a length of 3.42–3.56 mm (males) and 3.42–3.70 mm (females). Their body is broadly oval, strongly convex dorsally and integument black. The mouthparts, antennae, and trochanters are reddish-brown, and the remaining parts of the legs are dark brown.

== Etymology ==
The species name is from Latin globosus (meaning round, spherical) and refers to the broadly oval and strongly convex body shape.
