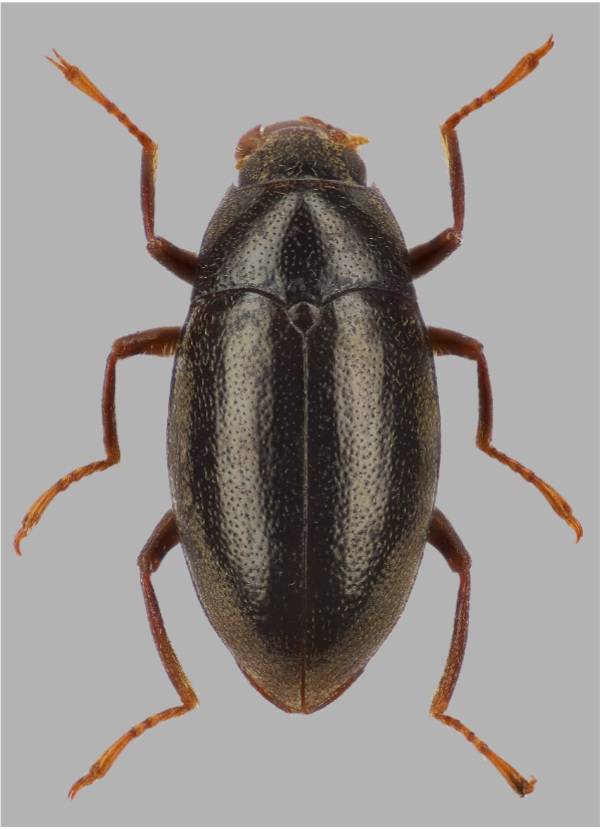

Scientific classification
- Kingdom: Animalia
- Phylum: Arthropoda
- Class: Insecta
- Order: Coleoptera
- Suborder: Polyphaga
- Infraorder: Elateriformia
- Family: Dryopidae
- Genus: Elmomorphus
- Species: E. mazzoldii

Binomial name
- Elmomorphus mazzoldii Selnekovič, Jäch & Kodada, 2024

= Elmomorphus mazzoldii =

Species of beetle

Elmomorphus mazzoldii is a species of beetle of the family Dryopidae. This species is found in Thailand.

== Description ==
Adults reach a length of 2.63 mm (males) and 2.60–2.83 mm (females). Their body is oval, strongly convex, widest around the middle of the elytra and integument black. The mouthparts, antennae and legs are reddish brown.

== Etymology ==
The species name is honours Paolo Mazzoldi, an Italian entomologist who provided interesting material to the authors.
