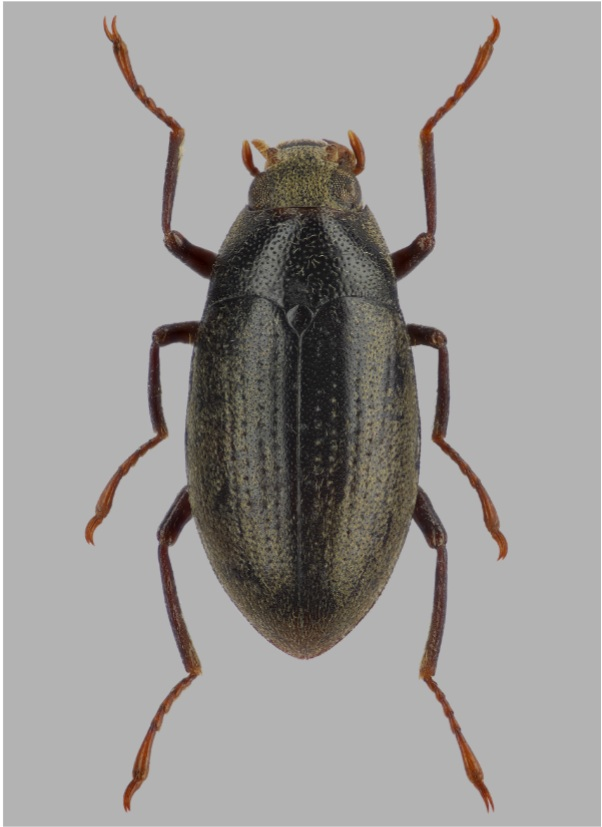

Scientific classification
- Kingdom: Animalia
- Phylum: Arthropoda
- Class: Insecta
- Order: Coleoptera
- Suborder: Polyphaga
- Infraorder: Elateriformia
- Family: Dryopidae
- Genus: Elmomorphus
- Species: E. auratus

Binomial name
- Elmomorphus auratus Kodada, Selnekovič & Jäch, 2024

= Elmomorphus auratus =

Species of beetle

Elmomorphus auratus is a species of beetle of the family Dryopidae. This species is found in China (Anhui, Fujian, Guangdong, Jiangxi, Zhejiang).

== Description ==
Adults reach a length of 2.69–3.07 mm (males) and 2.89–3.21 mm (females). Their body is oblong-ovate and dark brown to black, except for the reddish brown mouthparts, antennae and legs.

== Etymology ==
The species name is Latin and refers to the yellowish colour of the pubescence and plastron, covering almost the entire body surface.
