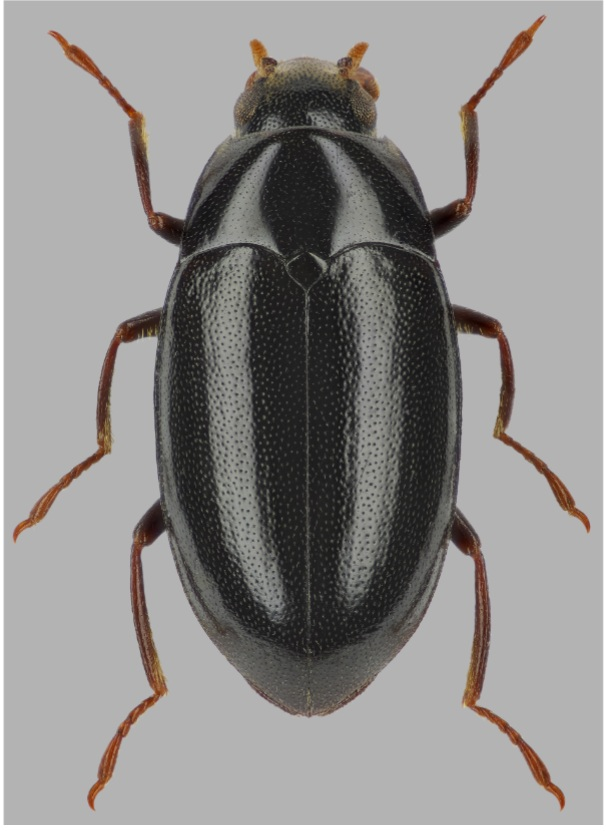

Scientific classification
- Kingdom: Animalia
- Phylum: Arthropoda
- Class: Insecta
- Order: Coleoptera
- Suborder: Polyphaga
- Infraorder: Elateriformia
- Family: Dryopidae
- Genus: Elmomorphus
- Species: E. oblongus

Binomial name
- Elmomorphus oblongus Kodada, Selnekovič & Jäch, 2024

= Elmomorphus oblongus =

Species of beetle

Elmomorphus oblongus is a species of beetle of the family Dryopidae. This species is found in Vietnam.

== Description ==
Adults reach a length of 3.21–3.50 mm (males) and 3.42–3.58 mm (females). Their body is oblong oval, strongly convex, widest between first and second thirds of elytra and black, while the antennae, mouthparts, and tarsi are reddish brown. The remaining parts of the legs are brown.

== Etymology ==
The species name is Latin oblongus (meaning oblong) and refers to the characteristic elongate body shape.
