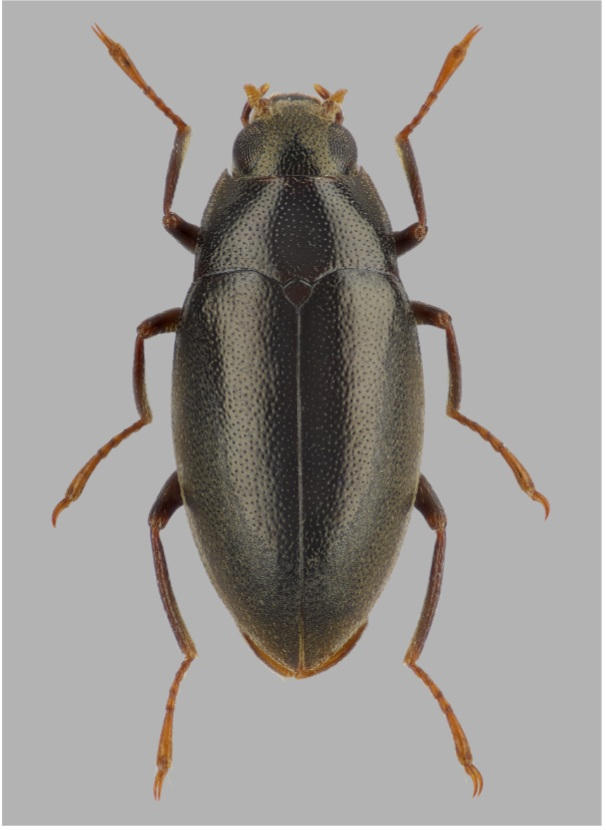

Scientific classification
- Kingdom: Animalia
- Phylum: Arthropoda
- Class: Insecta
- Order: Coleoptera
- Suborder: Polyphaga
- Infraorder: Elateriformia
- Family: Dryopidae
- Genus: Elmomorphus
- Species: E. ellipticus

Binomial name
- Elmomorphus ellipticus Selnekovič, Jäch & Kodada, 2024

= Elmomorphus ellipticus =

Species of beetle

Elmomorphus ellipticus is a species of beetle of the family Dryopidae. This species is found in China (Guangxi).

== Description ==
Adults reach a length of 2.71 mm (males) and 2.79–3.01 mm (females). Their body is oval, slender, moderately convex and integument black, while the mouthparts, antennae, trochanters, and tarsi are reddish brown and the remaining parts of the legs dark brown. The dorsum has a fine, bronze metallic sheen.

== Etymology ==
The species name is Latin meaning elliptical and refers to the oval body shape.
