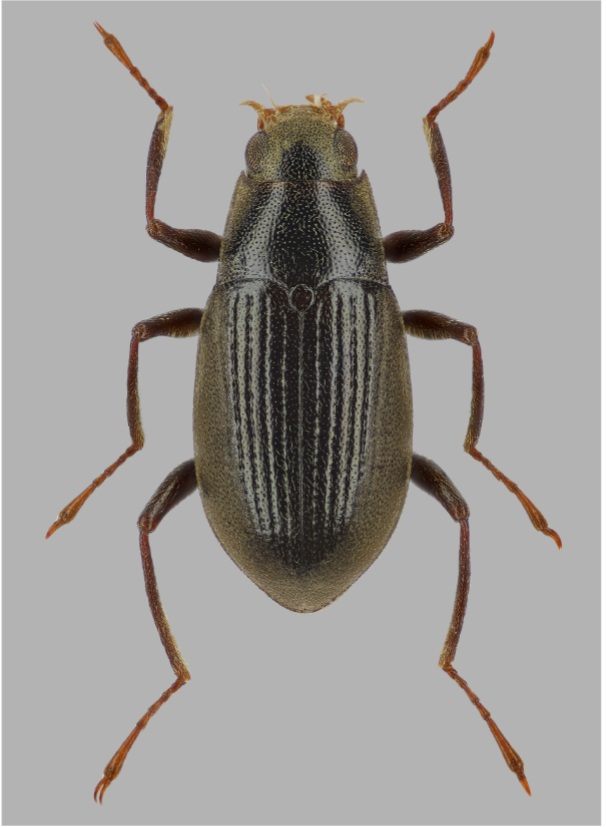

Scientific classification
- Kingdom: Animalia
- Phylum: Arthropoda
- Class: Insecta
- Order: Coleoptera
- Suborder: Polyphaga
- Infraorder: Elateriformia
- Family: Dryopidae
- Genus: Elmomorphus
- Species: E. elmoides

Binomial name
- Elmomorphus elmoides Kodada, Selnekovič & Jäch, 2024

= Elmomorphus elmoides =

Species of beetle

Elmomorphus elmoides is a species of beetle of the Dryopidae family. This species is found in Vietnam.

== Description ==
Adults reach a length of 2.47–2.68 mm (0.097–0.106 in) (males) and 2.65–2.94 mm (0.104–0.116 in) (females). Their body is elongate-ovate and black, except for reddish mouthparts, antennae, trochanters and tarsi. The remaining parts of the legs are brown to black.

== Etymology ==
The species name is Latin and refers to the superficial resemblance to various genera of Elmidae.
