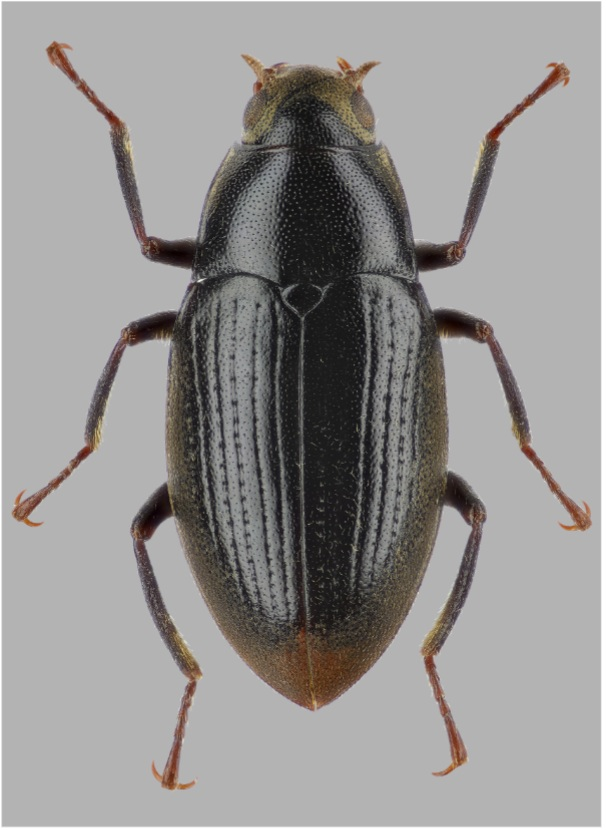

Scientific classification
- Kingdom: Animalia
- Phylum: Arthropoda
- Class: Insecta
- Order: Coleoptera
- Suborder: Polyphaga
- Infraorder: Elateriformia
- Family: Dryopidae
- Genus: Elmomorphus
- Species: E. depressus

Binomial name
- Elmomorphus depressus Kodada, Selnekovič & Jäch, 2024

= Elmomorphus depressus =

Species of beetle

Elmomorphus depressus is a species of beetle of the Dryopidae family. This species is found in China (Guangxi).

== Description ==
Adults reach a length of 3.58 mm (females). Their body is oblong oval and integument black, while the mouth parts, antennae, trochanters and tarsi are reddish brown.

== Etymology ==
The species name is Latin and refers to the depression on the prosternal process.
