= Helichus basalis =

Scientific classification
- Domain: Eukaryota
- Kingdom: Animalia
- Phylum: Arthropoda
- Class: Insecta
- Order: Coleoptera
- Suborder: Polyphaga
- Infraorder: Elateriformia
- Family: Dryopidae
- Genus: Helichus
- Species: H. basalis

Binomial name
- Helichus basalis LeConte, 1852

Species of beetle

Helichus basalis is a species of long-toed water beetle in the family Dryopidae. It is found in North America.
