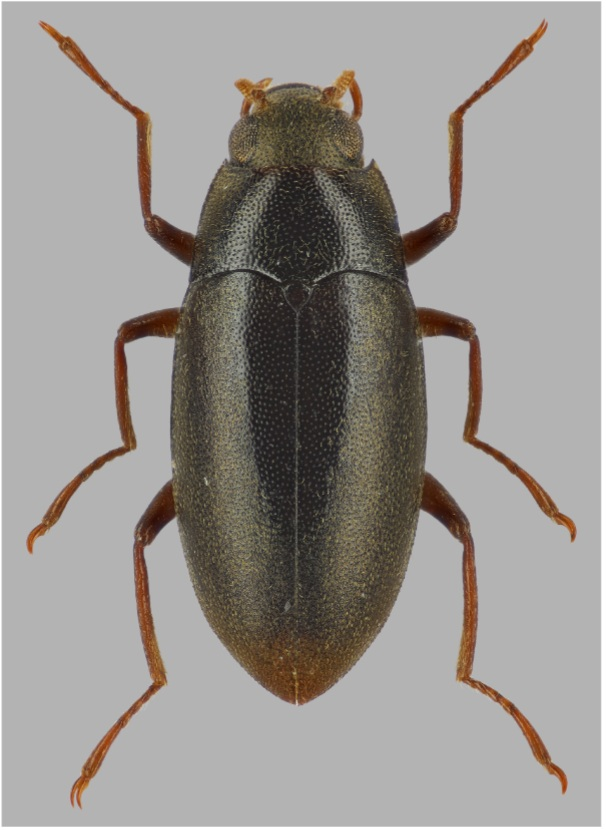

Scientific classification
- Kingdom: Animalia
- Phylum: Arthropoda
- Class: Insecta
- Order: Coleoptera
- Suborder: Polyphaga
- Infraorder: Elateriformia
- Family: Dryopidae
- Genus: Elmomorphus
- Species: E. cuneatus

Binomial name
- Elmomorphus cuneatus Kodada, Selnekovič & Jäch, 2024

= Elmomorphus cuneatus =

Species of beetle

Elmomorphus cuneatus is a species of beetle of the family Dryopidae. This species is found in Thailand.

== Description ==
Adults reach a length of 2.69 mm (males) and 2.66–2.74 mm (females). Their body is elongate oval, moderately convex and black, while the mouthparts, antennae, trochanters and tarsi are reddish brown and the remaining parts of the legs brown.

== Etymology ==
The species name is derived from a Latin word meaning wedge-shaped and refers to the narrow wedge-shaped glabrous area on the elytra.
