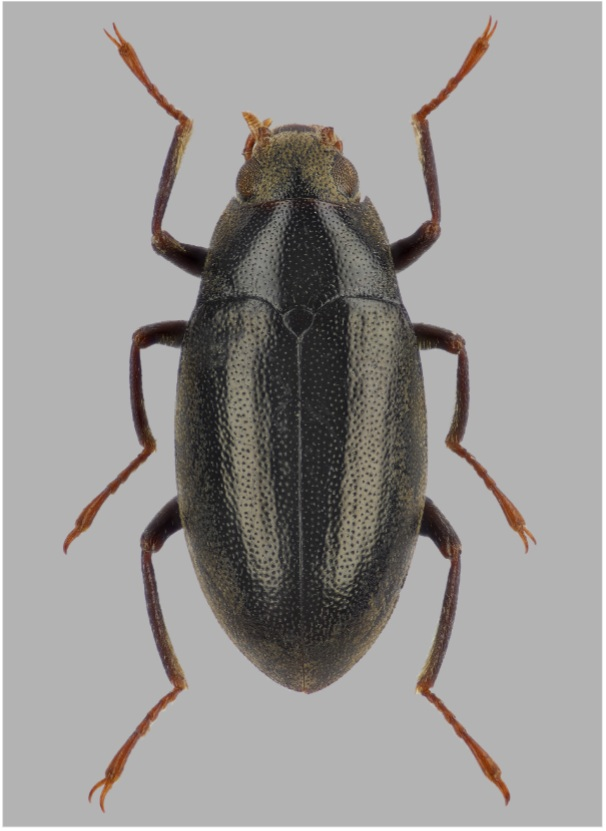

Scientific classification
- Kingdom: Animalia
- Phylum: Arthropoda
- Class: Insecta
- Order: Coleoptera
- Suborder: Polyphaga
- Infraorder: Elateriformia
- Family: Dryopidae
- Genus: Elmomorphus
- Species: E. yunnanensis

Binomial name
- Elmomorphus yunnanensis Kodada, Selnekovič & Jäch, 2024

= Elmomorphus yunnanensis =

Species of beetle

Elmomorphus yunnanensis is a species of beetle of the family Dryopidae. This species is found in China (Yunnan).

== Description ==
Adults reach a length of 3.29–3.67 mm (males) and 3.51 mm (females). Their body is oblong oval and integument black, while the mouthparts, antennae, and tarsi are reddish-brown.

== Etymology ==
The name of the species refers to the province of Yunnan, the type locality of the species.
