= Dryops arizonensis =

Scientific classification
- Kingdom: Animalia
- Phylum: Arthropoda
- Clade: Pancrustacea
- Class: Insecta
- Order: Coleoptera
- Suborder: Polyphaga
- Infraorder: Elateriformia
- Family: Dryopidae
- Genus: Dryops
- Species: D. arizonensis

Binomial name
- Dryops arizonensis (Schaeffer, 1905)

Species of beetle

Dryops arizonensis is a species of long-toed water beetle in the family Dryopidae. It is known from Arizona and Texas in the southern United States.

Dryops arizonensis is a small, brown beetle measuring 4.5 mm (0.18 in).
