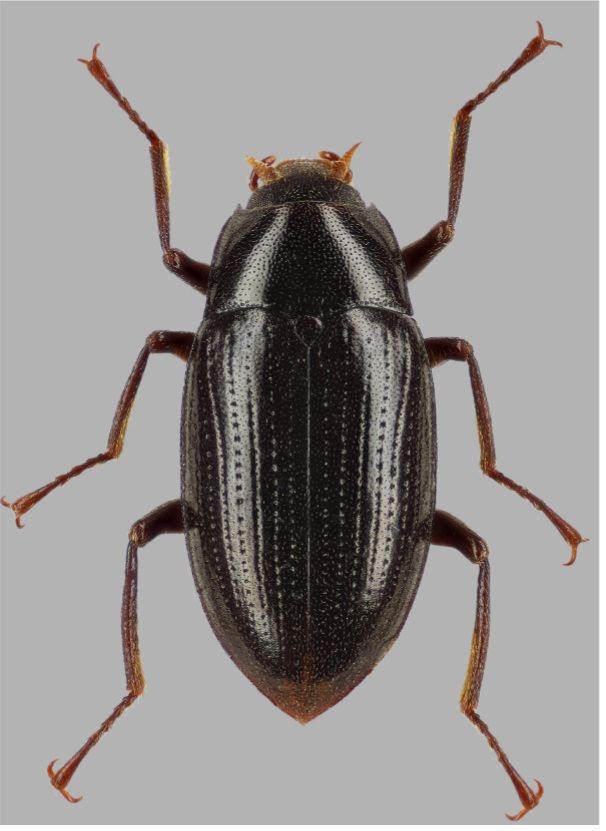

Scientific classification
- Kingdom: Animalia
- Phylum: Arthropoda
- Class: Insecta
- Order: Coleoptera
- Suborder: Polyphaga
- Infraorder: Elateriformia
- Family: Dryopidae
- Genus: Elmomorphus
- Species: E. jendeki

Binomial name
- Elmomorphus jendeki Kodada, Selnekovič & Jäch, 2024

= Elmomorphus jendeki =

Species of beetle

Elmomorphus jendeki is a species of beetle of the family Dryopidae. This species is found in Vietnam.

== Description ==
Adults reach a length of 3.47–3.85 mm (males) and 3.64–4.16 mm (females). Their body is broadly oval, strongly convex, widest around the midlength of the elytra and black. The mouthparts, antennae, trochanters and tarsi are reddish brown.

== Etymology ==
The species is named in honour of Eduard Jendek, a Slovak entomologist who provided a large number of Elmomorphus specimens for the study in which this species was described.
