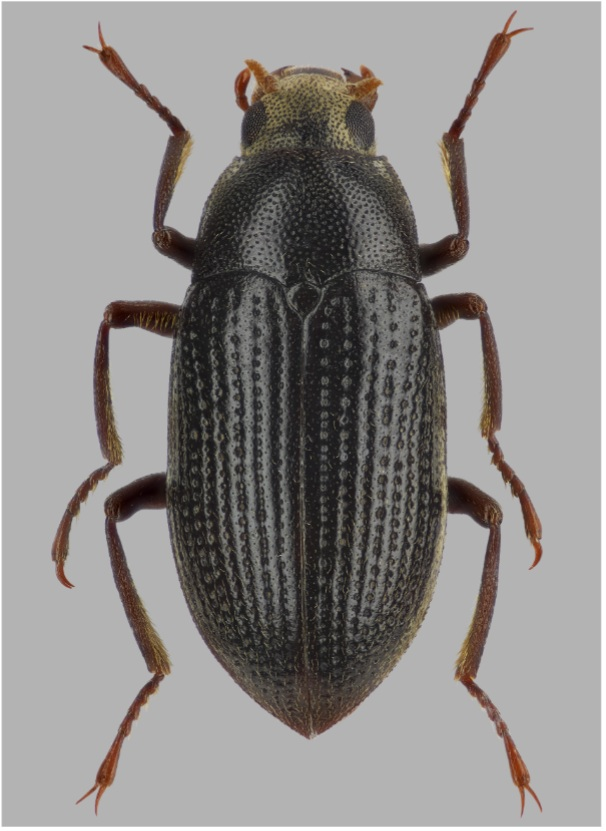

Scientific classification
- Kingdom: Animalia
- Phylum: Arthropoda
- Class: Insecta
- Order: Coleoptera
- Suborder: Polyphaga
- Infraorder: Elateriformia
- Family: Dryopidae
- Genus: Elmomorphus
- Species: E. catenatus

Binomial name
- Elmomorphus catenatus Kodada, Selnekovič & Jäch, 2024

= Elmomorphus catenatus =

Species of beetle

Elmomorphus catenatus is a species of beetle of the family Dryopidae. This species is found in China (Shaanxi).

== Description ==
Adults reach a length of 4.06–4.34 mm (males) and 4.46 mm (females). Their body is oblong-ovate, moderately convex dorsally and integument black, while the mouthparts, antennae, and tarsi are reddish brown.

== Etymology ==
The species name is a Latin word (meaning chained) and refers to the chain-like rows of coarse large elytral punctures.
