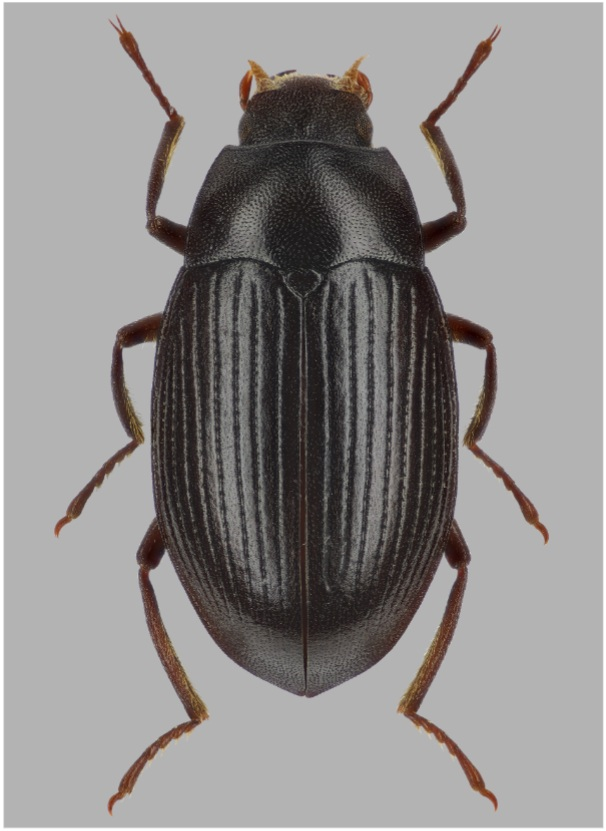

Scientific classification
- Kingdom: Animalia
- Phylum: Arthropoda
- Class: Insecta
- Order: Coleoptera
- Suborder: Polyphaga
- Infraorder: Elateriformia
- Family: Dryopidae
- Genus: Elmomorphus
- Species: E. schillhammeri

Binomial name
- Elmomorphus schillhammeri Kodada, Selnekovič & Jäch, 2024

= Elmomorphus schillhammeri =

Species of beetle

Elmomorphus schillhammeri is a species of beetle of the family Dryopidae. This species is found in China (Guizhou).

== Description ==
Adults reach a length of 4.15–4.36 mm (males) and 4.03–4.38 mm (females). Their body is ovate, strongly convex dorsally and integument black. The mouthparts, antennae and legs are reddish brown.

== Etymology ==
The species is named in honour of Dr. Harald Schillhammer, an Austrian entomologist who collected 14 new species of Elmomorphus in China, Myanmar and Laos.
