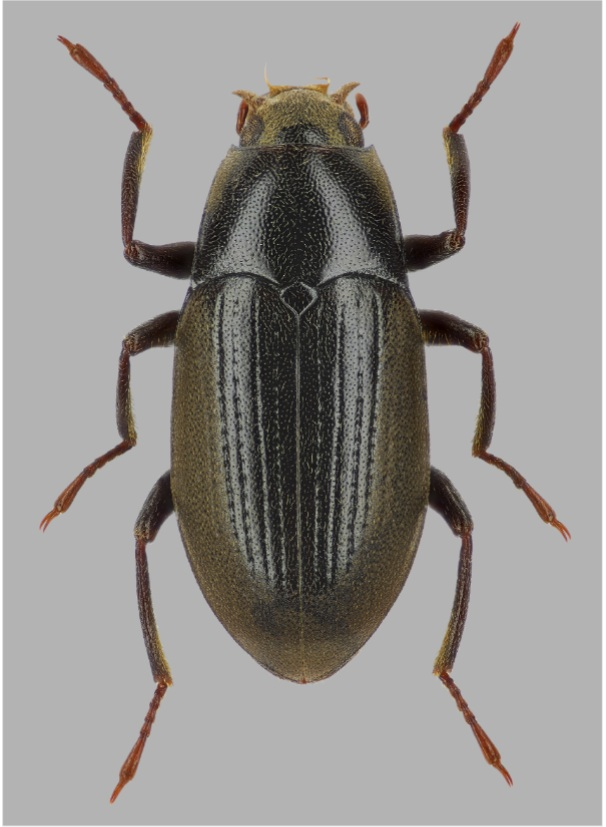

Scientific classification
- Kingdom: Animalia
- Phylum: Arthropoda
- Class: Insecta
- Order: Coleoptera
- Suborder: Polyphaga
- Infraorder: Elateriformia
- Family: Dryopidae
- Genus: Elmomorphus
- Species: E. calvus

Binomial name
- Elmomorphus calvus Kodada, Selnekovič & Jäch, 2024

= Elmomorphus calvus =

Species of beetle

Elmomorphus calvus is a species of beetle of the family Dryopidae. This species is found in China (Guangxi) and Vietnam.

== Description ==
Adults reach a length of 3.17–3.35 mm (males) and 3.15–3.45 mm (females). Their body is ovate and black, except for reddish brown mouthparts, antennae, trochanters and tarsi, and brown proximal portions of the tibiae.

== Etymology ==
The species name is Latin for hairless and refers to the glabrous dorsal surface.
