= Dryops =

Dryops may refer to:

- Dryops (beetle), a genus of beetles in family Dryopidae
- Dryops (crater), a crater on Callisto, a moon of Jupiter (see List of craters on Callisto)

In Greek mythology:

- Dryops, a son of King Priam of Troy
- Dryops (Oeta), a king of Oeta and son of the river-god Spercheus
- Dryops, a son of Apollo by Dia
- Dryops, a companion of Aeneas, killed by Clausus, king of the Sabines
- Dryops (mythology) for characters in Greek mythology named Dryops
