= Helichus lithophilus =

Scientific classification
- Domain: Eukaryota
- Kingdom: Animalia
- Phylum: Arthropoda
- Class: Insecta
- Order: Coleoptera
- Suborder: Polyphaga
- Infraorder: Elateriformia
- Family: Dryopidae
- Genus: Helichus
- Species: H. lithophilus

Binomial name
- Helichus lithophilus (Germar, 1824)

Species of beetle

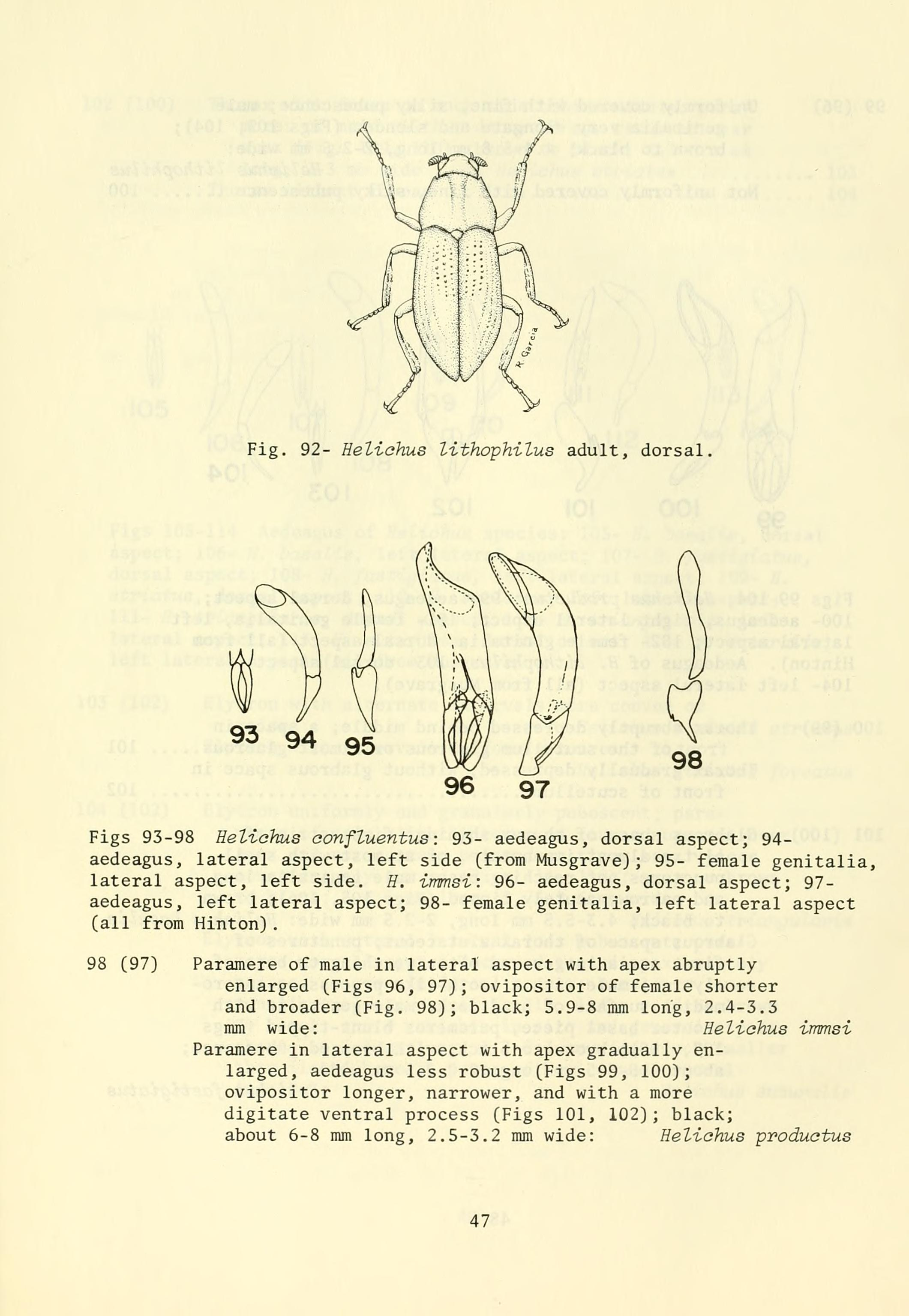
This is a figure of the dryopoid beetle.

Helichus lithophilus is a species of long-toed water beetle in the family Dryopidae. It is found in North America.
