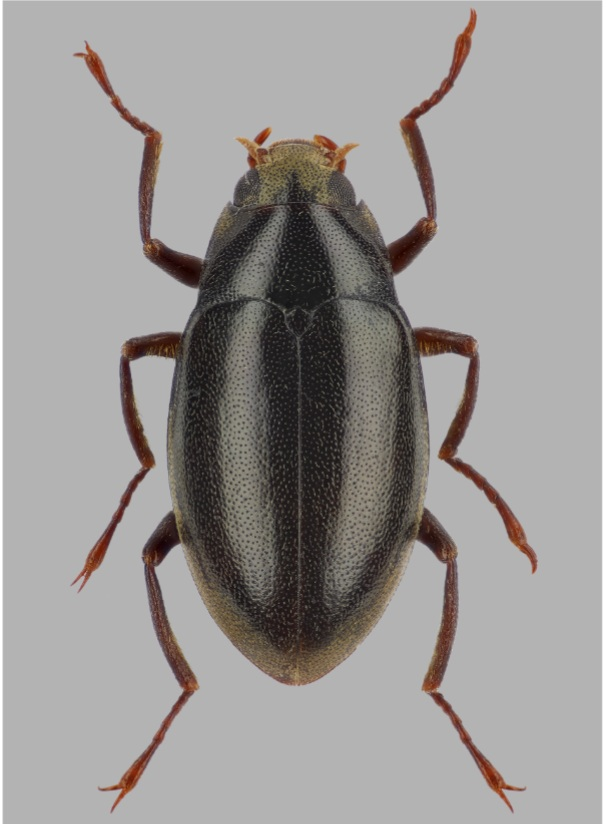

Scientific classification
- Kingdom: Animalia
- Phylum: Arthropoda
- Class: Insecta
- Order: Coleoptera
- Suborder: Polyphaga
- Infraorder: Elateriformia
- Family: Dryopidae
- Genus: Elmomorphus
- Species: E. corpulentus

Binomial name
- Elmomorphus corpulentus Kodada, Selnekovič & Jäch, 2024

= Elmomorphus corpulentus =

Species of beetle

Elmomorphus corpulentus is a species of beetle of the Dryopidae family. This species is found in China (Fujian).

== Description ==
Adults reach a length of 3.32 mm (males) and 3.31 mm (females). Their body is broadly ovate, strongly convex dorsally and integument black, while the mouthparts, antennae and legs are dark reddish brown.

== Etymology ==
The species name is Latin meaning corpulent or stout and refers to the broad and strongly convex body form.
