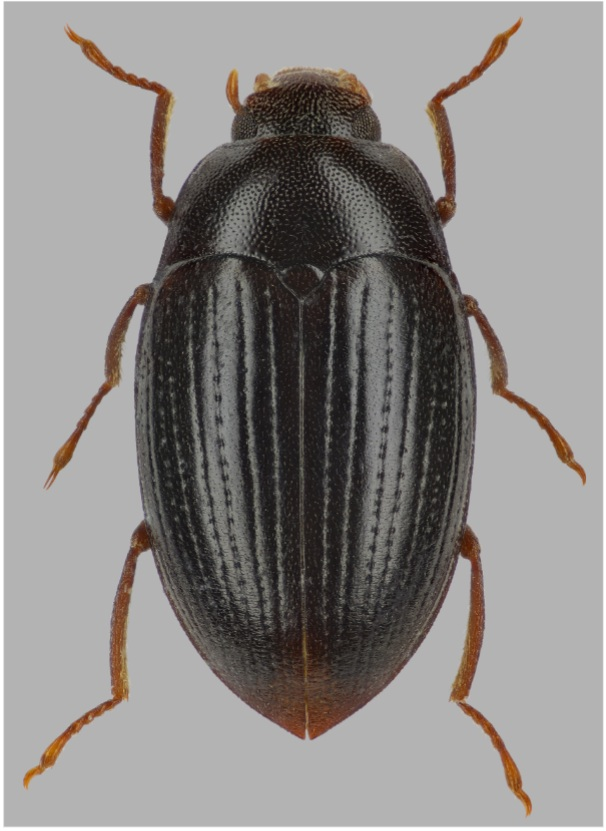

Scientific classification
- Kingdom: Animalia
- Phylum: Arthropoda
- Class: Insecta
- Order: Coleoptera
- Suborder: Polyphaga
- Infraorder: Elateriformia
- Family: Dryopidae
- Genus: Elmomorphus
- Species: E. schoenmanni

Binomial name
- Elmomorphus schoenmanni Kodada, Selnekovič & Jäch, 2024

= Elmomorphus schoenmanni =

Species of beetle

Elmomorphus schoenmanni is a species of beetle of the family Dryopidae. This species is found in China (Guangxi).

== Description ==
Adults reach a length of 2.98 mm (males) and 3.07–3.21 mm (females). Their body is broadly oval, strongly convex dorsally and integument black. The mouthparts, antennae, and legs are reddish brown.

== Etymology ==
The species name honours the collecting efforts of Dr Heinrich Schönmann, an Austrian entomologist, who collected 18 new species of Elmomorphus in China, which equals 60% of the total number of species known from this country.
