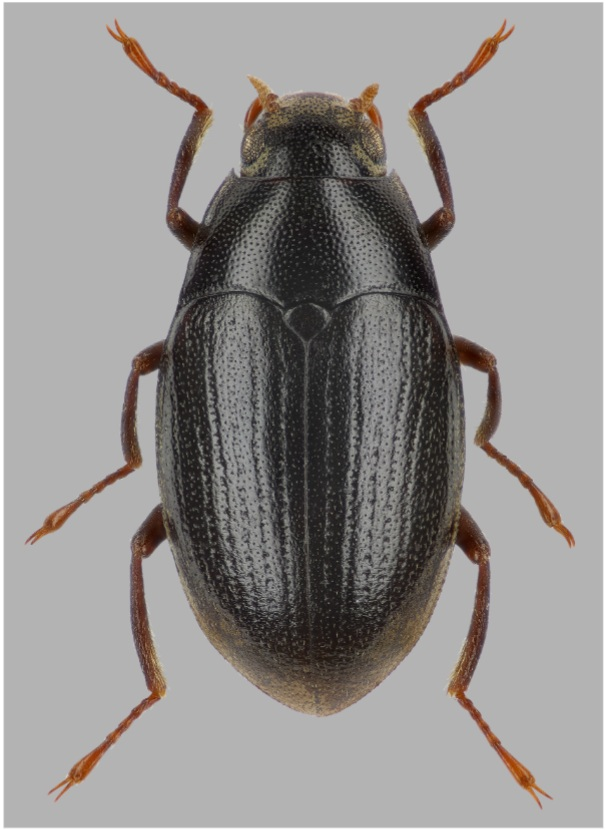

Scientific classification
- Kingdom: Animalia
- Phylum: Arthropoda
- Class: Insecta
- Order: Coleoptera
- Suborder: Polyphaga
- Infraorder: Elateriformia
- Family: Dryopidae
- Genus: Elmomorphus
- Species: E. hongkong

Binomial name
- Elmomorphus hongkong Selnekovič, Jäch & Kodada, 2024

= Elmomorphus hongkong =

Species of beetle

Elmomorphus hongkong is a species of beetle of the Dryopidae family. This species is found in China (Hong Kong).

== Description ==
Adults reach a length of 2.31–2.55 mm (0.091–0.100 in) (males) and 2.53–2.94 mm (0.100–0.116 in) (females). Their body is oval and integument black, while the mouthparts, antennae and legs are reddish brown.

== Etymology ==
The species name refers to the type locality.
