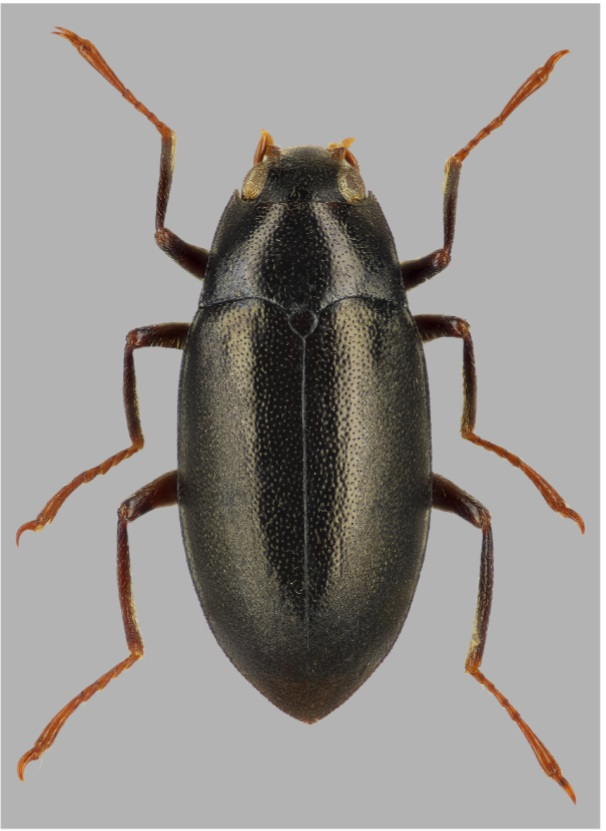

Scientific classification
- Kingdom: Animalia
- Phylum: Arthropoda
- Class: Insecta
- Order: Coleoptera
- Suborder: Polyphaga
- Infraorder: Elateriformia
- Family: Dryopidae
- Genus: Elmomorphus
- Species: E. sausai

Binomial name
- Elmomorphus sausai Kodada, Selnekovič & Jäch, 2024

= Elmomorphus sausai =

Species of beetle

Elmomorphus sausai is a species of beetle of the family Dryopidae. This species is found in Vietnam.

== Description ==
Adults reach a length of 3.07–3.15 mm (males) and 3.15–3.28 mm (females). Their body is ovate and black, while the mouthparts, antennae, trochanters, proximal portions of the femora, and tarsi are reddish brown.

== Etymology ==
The species is named in honour of Ondrej Šauša, a Slovak entomologist who collected the holotype.
