= Elmomorphus bryanti =

Scientific classification
- Kingdom: Animalia
- Phylum: Arthropoda
- Class: Insecta
- Order: Coleoptera
- Suborder: Polyphaga
- Infraorder: Elateriformia
- Family: Dryopidae
- Genus: Elmomorphus
- Species: E. bryanti

Binomial name
- Elmomorphus bryanti Hinton, 1935

Species of beetle

Elmomorphus bryanti is a species of beetle of the family Dryopidae. This species is found in Malaysia (Kuala Lumpur, Selangor) and possibly Thailand.

== Description ==
Adults reach a length of 2.6–2.8 mm. Their body is elongate oval, moderately convex dorsally. They are brown, with the head and pronotum darkened and the legs, anterior pronotal margin, antennae and mouthparts paler.
