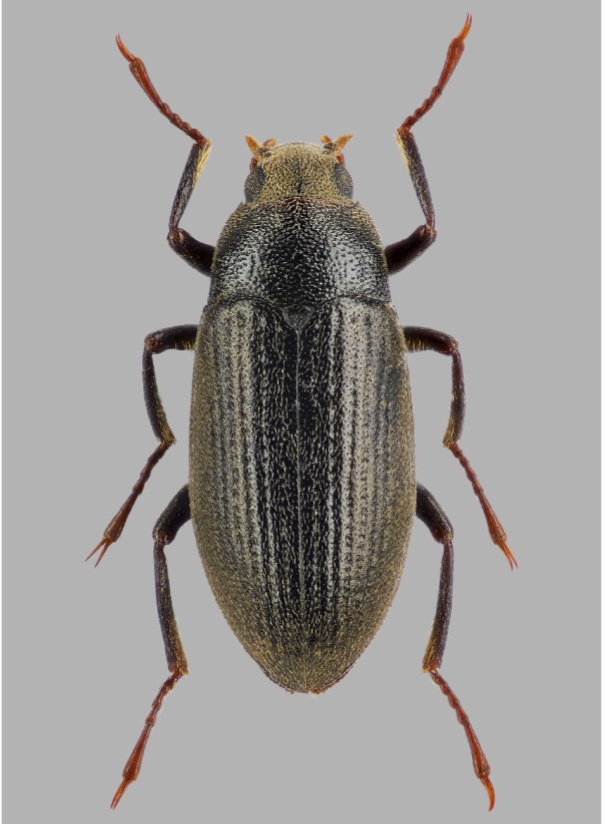

Scientific classification
- Kingdom: Animalia
- Phylum: Arthropoda
- Class: Insecta
- Order: Coleoptera
- Suborder: Polyphaga
- Infraorder: Elateriformia
- Family: Dryopidae
- Genus: Elmomorphus
- Species: E. fusiformis

Binomial name
- Elmomorphus fusiformis Kodada, Selnekovič & Jäch, 2024

= Elmomorphus fusiformis =

Species of beetle

Elmomorphus fusiformis is a species of beetle of the Dryopidae family. This species is found in China (Yunnan).

== Description ==
Adults reach a length of 3.86–4.13 mm (males) and 3.95–4.29 mm (females). Their body is oblong-ovate and integument black, while the mouthparts, antennae and tarsi are reddish-brown.

== Etymology ==
The species name is Latin for spindle-shaped and refers to the oblong-ovate and strongly convex body shape.
