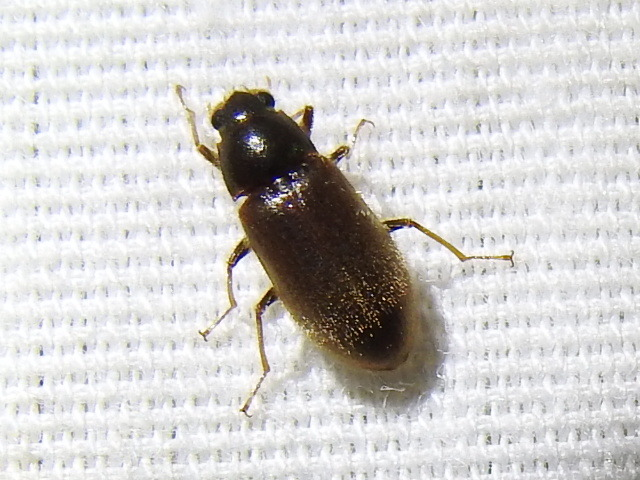

Scientific classification
- Domain: Eukaryota
- Kingdom: Animalia
- Phylum: Arthropoda
- Class: Insecta
- Order: Coleoptera
- Suborder: Polyphaga
- Infraorder: Elateriformia
- Family: Dryopidae
- Genus: Pelonomus
- Species: P. obscurus

Binomial name
- Pelonomus obscurus Leconte, 1852

= Pelonomus obscurus =

Species of beetle

Pelonomus obscurus is a species of long-toed water beetle in the family Dryopidae. It is found in the Caribbean Sea, Central America, and North America.

== Subspecies ==
These two subspecies belong to the species Pelonomus obscurus:

- Pelonomus obscurus gracilipes Chevrolat, 1864
- Pelonomus obscurus obscurus LeConte, 1852
