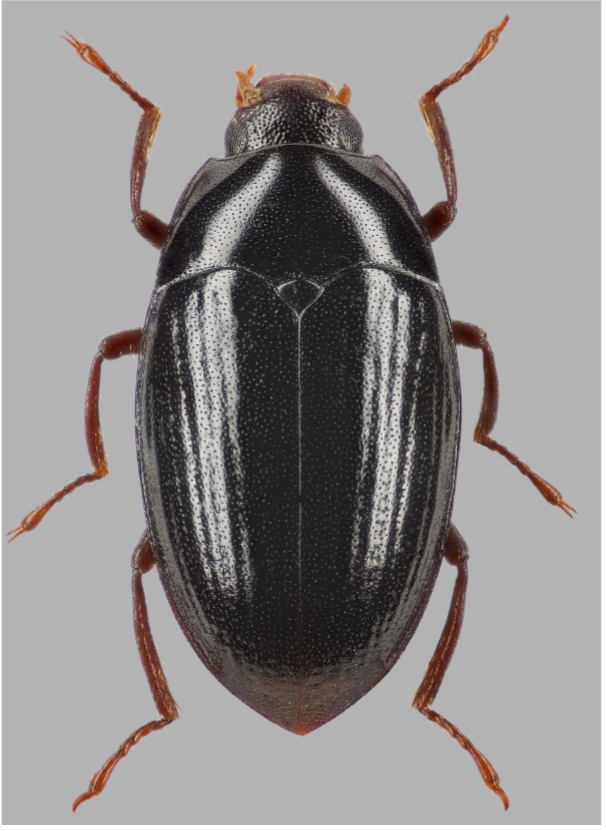

Scientific classification
- Kingdom: Animalia
- Phylum: Arthropoda
- Class: Insecta
- Order: Coleoptera
- Suborder: Polyphaga
- Infraorder: Elateriformia
- Family: Dryopidae
- Genus: Elmomorphus
- Species: E. hamatus

Binomial name
- Elmomorphus hamatus Kodada, Selnekovič & Jäch, 2024

= Elmomorphus hamatus =

Species of beetle

Elmomorphus hamatus is a species of beetle of the family Dryopidae. This species is found in China (Hunan).

== Description ==
Adults reach a length of 3.21–3.52 mm (males) and 3.24–3.75 mm (females). Their body is oval, strongly convex, widest just before elytral midlength and black, while the antennae, mouthparts, and legs are reddish brown.

== Etymology ==
The species name is Latin hamatus (meaning hooked) and refers to the curved parameres.
