= Elmomorphus prosternalis =

Scientific classification
- Kingdom: Animalia
- Phylum: Arthropoda
- Class: Insecta
- Order: Coleoptera
- Suborder: Polyphaga
- Infraorder: Elateriformia
- Family: Dryopidae
- Genus: Elmomorphus
- Species: E. prosternalis

Binomial name
- Elmomorphus prosternalis Hinton, 1935

Species of beetle

Elmomorphus prosternalis is a species of beetle of the family Dryopidae. This species is found in southern Thailand.

== Description ==
Adults reach a length of about 3.20 mm. Their body is elongate oval, moderately convex dorsally and brown, with the legs slightly paler.
