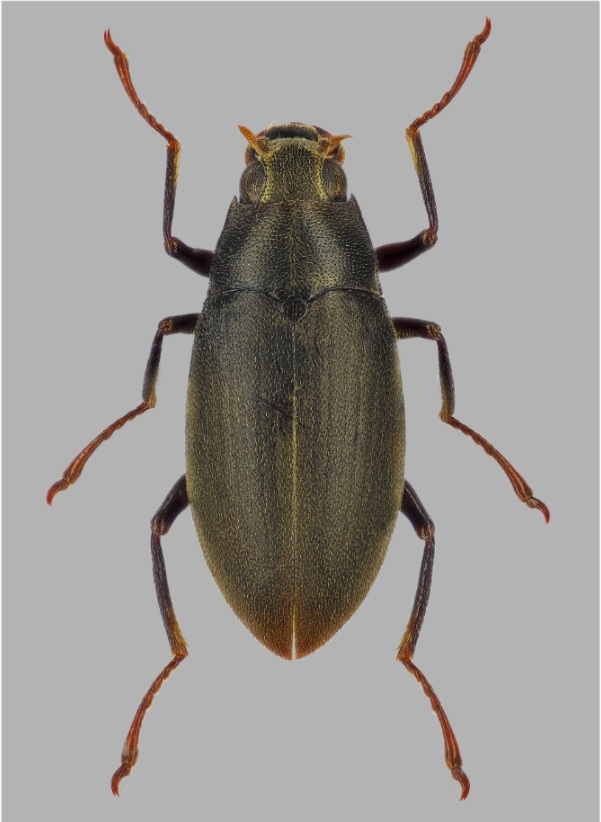

Scientific classification
- Kingdom: Animalia
- Phylum: Arthropoda
- Class: Insecta
- Order: Coleoptera
- Suborder: Polyphaga
- Infraorder: Elateriformia
- Family: Dryopidae
- Genus: Elmomorphus
- Species: E. striatellus

Binomial name
- Elmomorphus striatellus Delève, 1968

= Elmomorphus striatellus =

Species of beetle

Elmomorphus striatellus is a species of beetle of the Dryopidae family. This species is found in Laos and Vietnam.

== Description ==
Adults reach a length of 3.36–3.84 mm (males) and 3.41–3.77 mm (females). Their body is ovate and black, except for reddish brown mouthparts, trochanters and tarsi.
