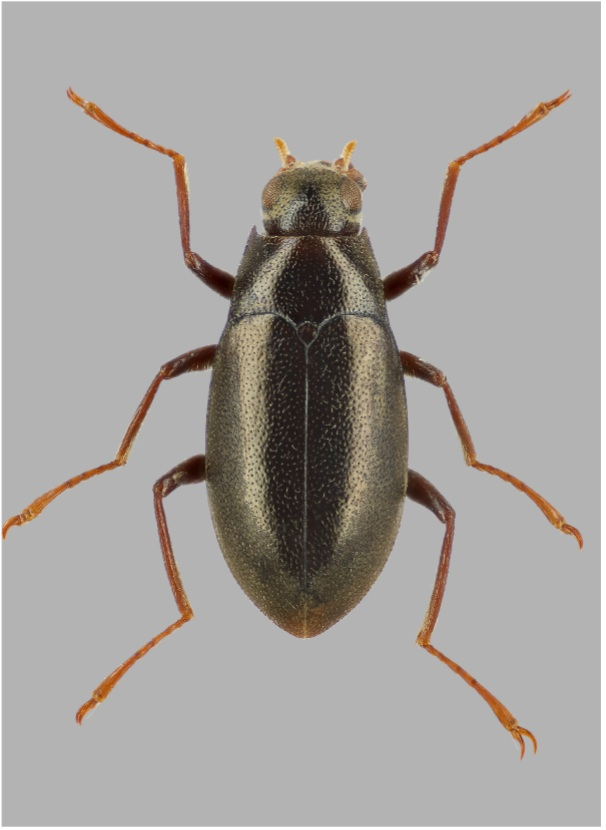

Scientific classification
- Kingdom: Animalia
- Phylum: Arthropoda
- Class: Insecta
- Order: Coleoptera
- Suborder: Polyphaga
- Infraorder: Elateriformia
- Family: Dryopidae
- Genus: Elmomorphus
- Species: E. umphangicus

Binomial name
- Elmomorphus umphangicus Kodada, Selnekovič & Jäch, 2024

= Elmomorphus umphangicus =

Species of beetle

Elmomorphus umphangicus is a species of beetle of the family Dryopidae. This species is found in Thailand.

== Description ==
Adults reach a length of 2.64–2.90 mm (males) and 2.46–3.12 mm (females). Their body is elongate oval and black, while the mouthparts, antennae, trochanters, and tarsi are reddish brown and the remaining parts of the legs are dark brown.

== Etymology ==
The species name is Latin and refers to the type locality of the species.
