= Ceradryops punctatus =

Scientific classification
- Kingdom: Animalia
- Phylum: Arthropoda
- Class: Insecta
- Order: Coleoptera
- Suborder: Polyphaga
- Infraorder: Elateriformia
- Superfamily: Byrrhoidea
- Family: Dryopidae
- Genus: Ceradryops
- Species: C. punctatus

Binomial name
- Ceradryops punctatus Hinton, 1937

Species of beetle

Ceradryops punctatus, is a species of long-toed water beetle found in Sri Lanka.

Antennae with five-segments or antennomeres.
