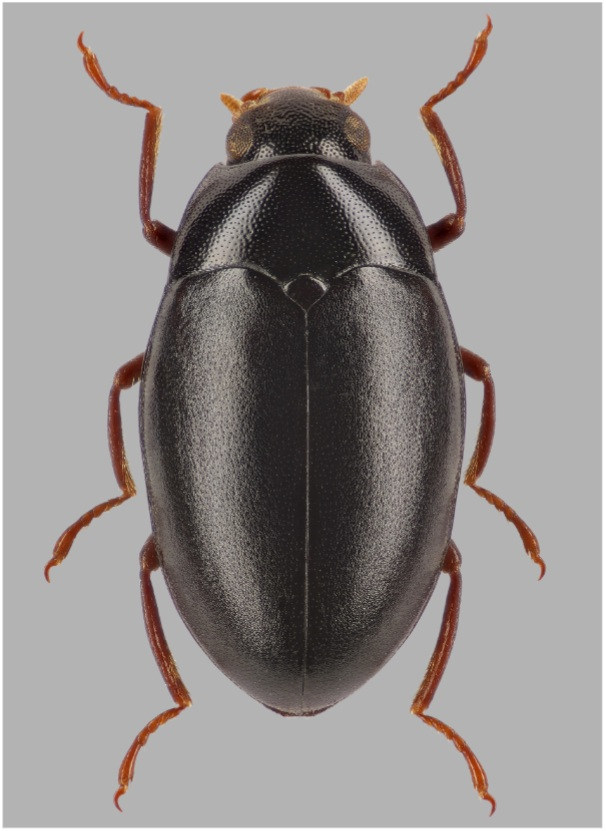

Scientific classification
- Kingdom: Animalia
- Phylum: Arthropoda
- Class: Insecta
- Order: Coleoptera
- Suborder: Polyphaga
- Infraorder: Elateriformia
- Family: Dryopidae
- Genus: Elmomorphus
- Species: E. reticulatus

Binomial name
- Elmomorphus reticulatus Kodada, Selnekovič & Jäch, 2024

= Elmomorphus reticulatus =

Species of beetle

Elmomorphus reticulatus is a species of beetle of the family Dryopidae. This species is found in China (Hainan).

== Description ==
Adults reach a length of 3.00–3.54 mm (males) and 3.29–3.50 mm (females). Their body is oval, strongly convex dorsally and integument black. The mouth parts, antennae, and legs are reddish brown.

== Etymology ==
The species name is a Latin word referring to the strong elytral reticulation.
