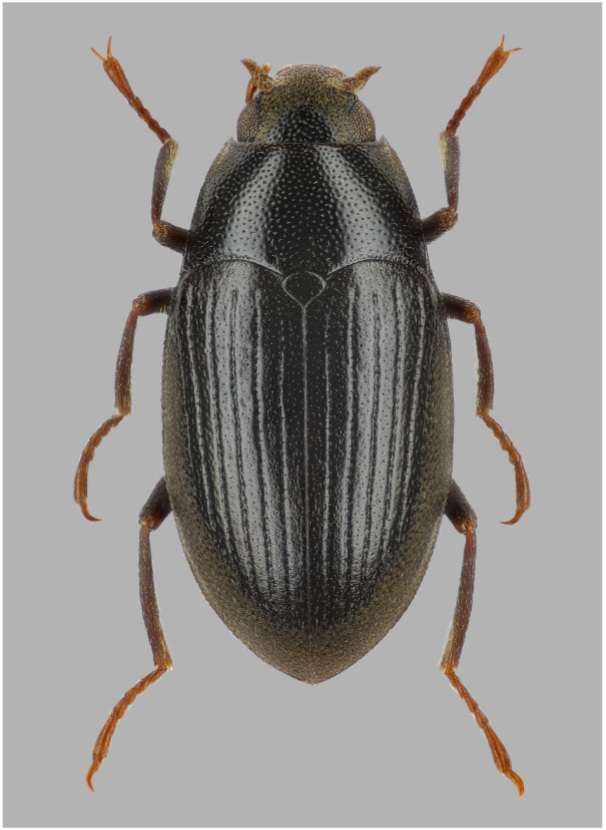

Scientific classification
- Kingdom: Animalia
- Phylum: Arthropoda
- Class: Insecta
- Order: Coleoptera
- Suborder: Polyphaga
- Infraorder: Elateriformia
- Family: Dryopidae
- Genus: Elmomorphus
- Species: E. sulcatus

Binomial name
- Elmomorphus sulcatus Kodada, Selnekovič & Jäch, 2024

= Elmomorphus sulcatus =

Species of beetle

Elmomorphus sulcatus is a species of beetle of the Dryopidae family. This species is found in China (Fujian, Guangdong, Guangxi).

== Description ==
Adults reach a length of 2.36–2.61 mm (males) and 2.53–2.76 mm (females). Their body is ovate, moderately convex dorsally and integument black, while the mouthparts, antennae and legs are reddish brown.

== Etymology ==
The species name is Latin and refers to the presence of nine well-impressed longitudinal striae on each elytron.
