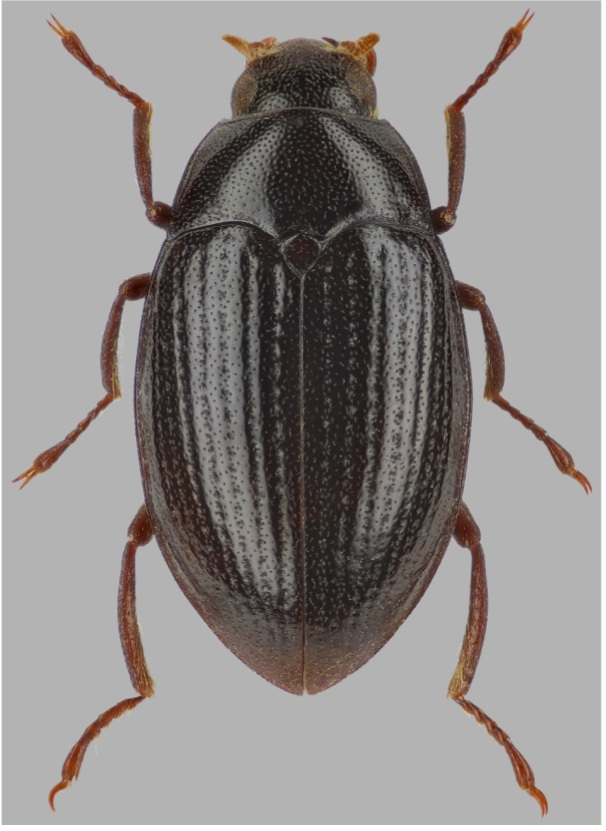

Scientific classification
- Kingdom: Animalia
- Phylum: Arthropoda
- Class: Insecta
- Order: Coleoptera
- Suborder: Polyphaga
- Infraorder: Elateriformia
- Family: Dryopidae
- Genus: Elmomorphus
- Species: E. superficialis

Binomial name
- Elmomorphus superficialis Kodada, Selnekovič & Jäch, 2024

= Elmomorphus superficialis =

Species of beetle

Elmomorphus superficialis is a species of beetle of the family Dryopidae. This species is found in China (Anhui, Fujian, Jiangxi).

== Description ==
Adults reach a length of 3.21–3.52 mm (males) and 3.24–3.75 mm (females). Their body is broadly oval, strongly convex dorsally and integument black, while the mouth parts, antennae, and legs are reddish-brown.

== Etymology ==
The species name is Latin superficialis (meaning superficial) and refers to the distinct, but weakly impressed, longitudinal rows of large elytral punctures.
