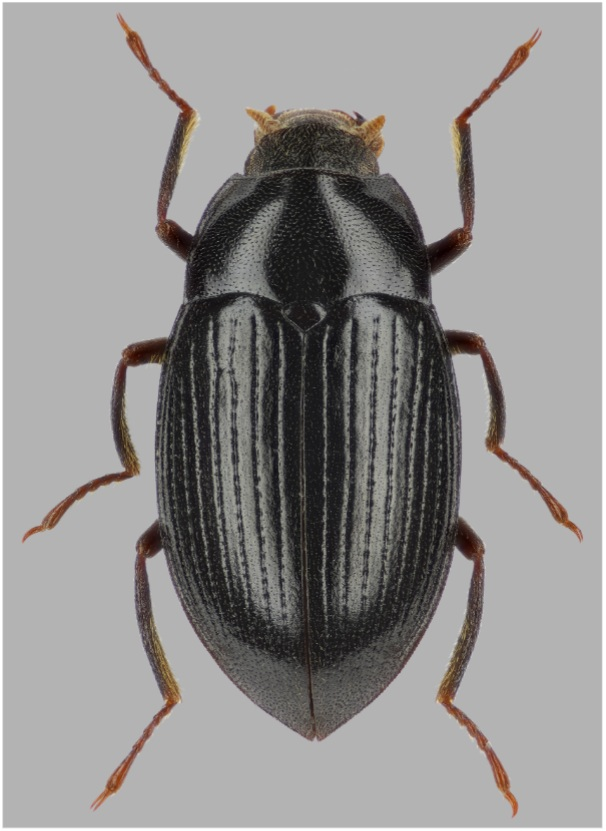

Scientific classification
- Kingdom: Animalia
- Phylum: Arthropoda
- Class: Insecta
- Order: Coleoptera
- Suborder: Polyphaga
- Infraorder: Elateriformia
- Family: Dryopidae
- Genus: Elmomorphus
- Species: E. ovalis

Binomial name
- Elmomorphus ovalis Kodada, Selnekovič & Jäch, 2024

= Elmomorphus ovalis =

Species of beetle

Elmomorphus ovalis is a species of beetle of the family Dryopidae. This species is found in China (Yunnan).

== Description ==
Adults reach a length of 3.80–3.84 mm (males) and 3.87–4.13 mm (females). Their body is oval, strongly convex dorsally and integument black, while the mouth parts, antennae, trochanters, and tarsi are reddish brown. The remaining parts of the legs are dark brown.

== Etymology ==
The species name is from Latin ovalis (meaning oval) and refers to the oval body shape.
