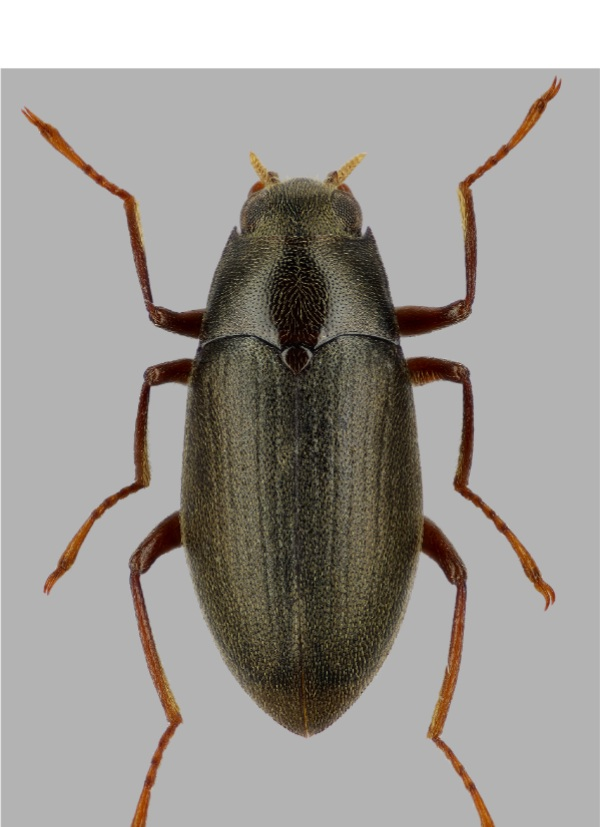

Scientific classification
- Kingdom: Animalia
- Phylum: Arthropoda
- Class: Insecta
- Order: Coleoptera
- Suborder: Polyphaga
- Infraorder: Elateriformia
- Family: Dryopidae
- Genus: Elmomorphus
- Species: E. auripilosus

Binomial name
- Elmomorphus auripilosus Selnekovič, Jäch & Kodada, 2024

= Elmomorphus auripilosus =

Species of beetle

Elmomorphus auripilosus is a species of beetle of the Dryopidae family. This species is found in Vietnam.

== Description ==
Adults reach a length of 3.07–3.38 mm (males) and 3.06–3.51 mm (females). Their body is ovate and black, except for reddish brown mouthparts, antennae, tarsi, trochanters, and proximal portions of the femora. The remaining parts of the legs are dark brown to black.

== Etymology ==
The species name is Latin and refers to the golden colour of the pubescence and plastron, covering almost the entire body surface.
