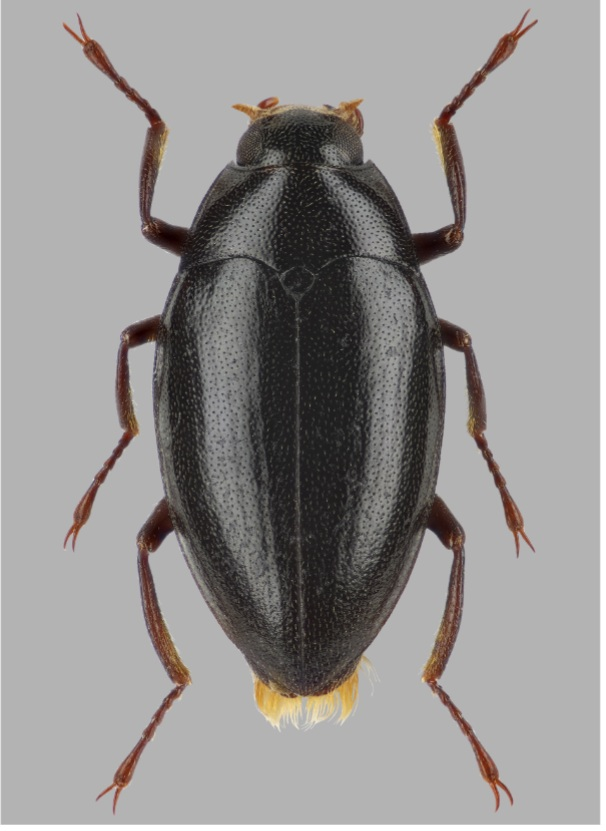

Scientific classification
- Kingdom: Animalia
- Phylum: Arthropoda
- Class: Insecta
- Order: Coleoptera
- Suborder: Polyphaga
- Infraorder: Elateriformia
- Family: Dryopidae
- Genus: Elmomorphus
- Species: E. comosiclunis

Binomial name
- Elmomorphus comosiclunis Kodada, Selnekovič & Jäch, 2024

= Elmomorphus comosiclunis =

Species of beetle

Elmomorphus comosiclunis is a species of beetle of the family Dryopidae. This species is found in China (Fujian, Guangdong).

== Description ==
Adults reach a length of 3.59–3.87 mm (males) and 3.41–4.03 mm (females). Their body is obovate, strongly convex dorsally and integument black, while the antennae, mouthparts, and legs are reddish-brown.

== Etymology ==
The species name is composed of the Latin adjective comosus (meaning very hairy) and the Latin noun clunis (meaning rump) and refers to the conspicuous cluster of long setae on the male ventrite 5.
