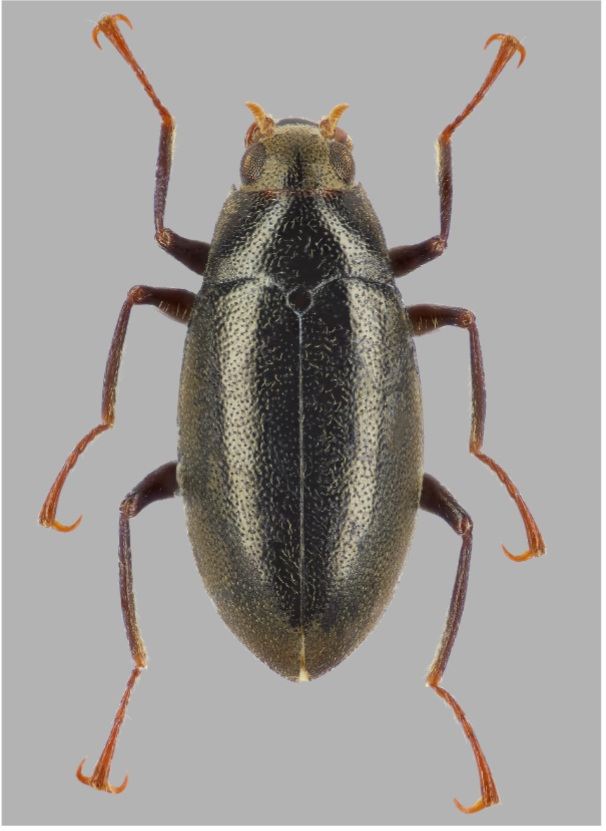

Scientific classification
- Kingdom: Animalia
- Phylum: Arthropoda
- Class: Insecta
- Order: Coleoptera
- Suborder: Polyphaga
- Infraorder: Elateriformia
- Family: Dryopidae
- Genus: Elmomorphus
- Species: E. longitarsis

Binomial name
- Elmomorphus longitarsis Kodada, Selnekovič & Jäch, 2024

= Elmomorphus longitarsis =

Species of beetle

Elmomorphus longitarsis is a species of beetle of the family Dryopidae. This species is found in Thailand.

== Description ==
Adults reach a length of 2.93–3.09 mm (males) and 3.15–3.32 mm (females). Their body is oblong oval and integument black, while the mouthparts, antennae and tarsi are reddish-brown.

== Etymology ==
The species name is Latin and refers to the long tarsi.
