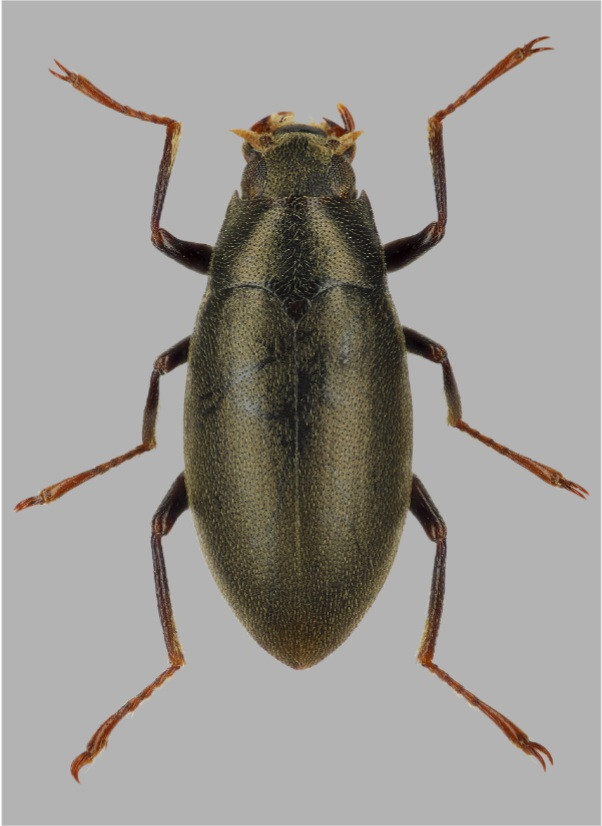

Scientific classification
- Kingdom: Animalia
- Phylum: Arthropoda
- Class: Insecta
- Order: Coleoptera
- Suborder: Polyphaga
- Infraorder: Elateriformia
- Family: Dryopidae
- Genus: Elmomorphus
- Species: E. siamensis

Binomial name
- Elmomorphus siamensis Kodada, Selnekovič & Jäch, 2024

= Elmomorphus siamensis =

Species of beetle

Elmomorphus siamensis is a species of beetle of the Dryopidae family. This species is found in Cambodia, Laos, Myanmar, Thailand and Vietnam.

== Description ==
Adults reach a length of 2.73–3.20 mm (males) and 2.78–3.25 mm (females). Their body is ovate and black, except for reddish brown mouthparts, antennae, trochanters, and tarsi.

== Etymology ==
The species name is Latin and refers to Siam, the former name of Thailand.
