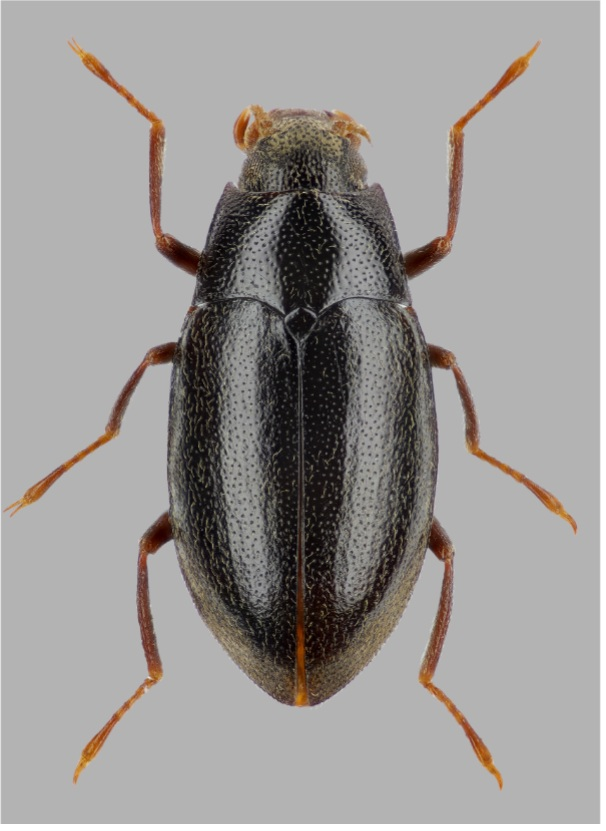

Scientific classification
- Kingdom: Animalia
- Phylum: Arthropoda
- Class: Insecta
- Order: Coleoptera
- Suborder: Polyphaga
- Infraorder: Elateriformia
- Family: Dryopidae
- Genus: Elmomorphus
- Species: E. nepalensis

Binomial name
- Elmomorphus nepalensis Satô, 1981

= Elmomorphus nepalensis =

Species of beetle

Elmomorphus nepalensis is a species of beetle of the family Dryopidae. This species is found in Bhutan and Nepal.

== Description ==
Adults reach a length of 2.41–2.70 mm (males) and 2.65–3.06 mm (females). Their body is oblong oval, convex and integument dark brown to black, while the trochanters, tarsi, antennae, and mouthparts are reddish brown.
