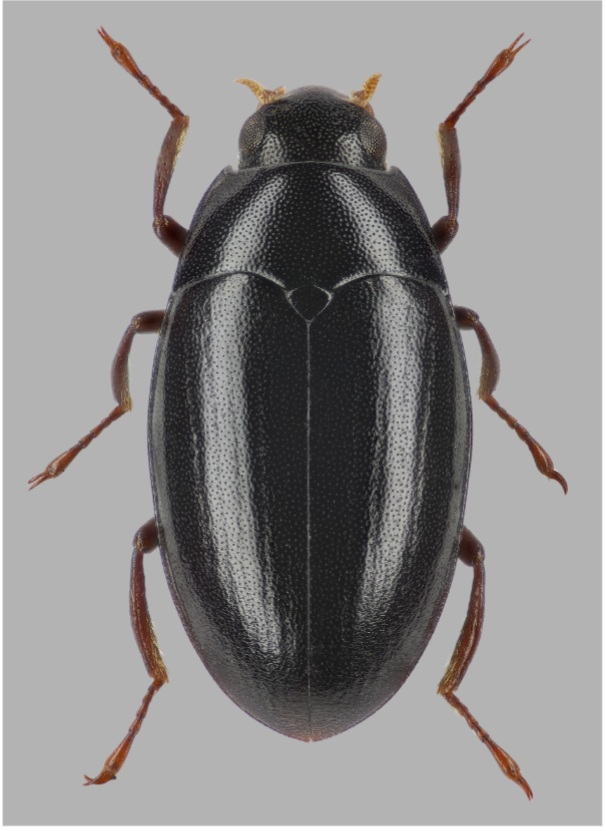

Scientific classification
- Kingdom: Animalia
- Phylum: Arthropoda
- Class: Insecta
- Order: Coleoptera
- Suborder: Polyphaga
- Infraorder: Elateriformia
- Family: Dryopidae
- Genus: Elmomorphus
- Species: E. glabriclunis

Binomial name
- Elmomorphus glabriclunis Kodada, Selnekovič & Jäch, 2024

= Elmomorphus glabriclunis =

Species of beetle

Elmomorphus glabriclunis is a species of beetle of the family Dryopidae. This species is found in China (Fujian, Guangdong, Guangxi, Hong Kong).

== Description ==
Adults reach a length of 3.14–3.63 mm (males) and 3.36–3.70 mm (females). Their body is oval, moderately convex dorsally and integument black. The mouthparts, antennae, and legs are reddish brown.

== Etymology ==
The species name is a combination of the Latin words glaber (meaning glabrous) and clunis (meaning rump) and refers to the glabrous area on ventrite 5.
