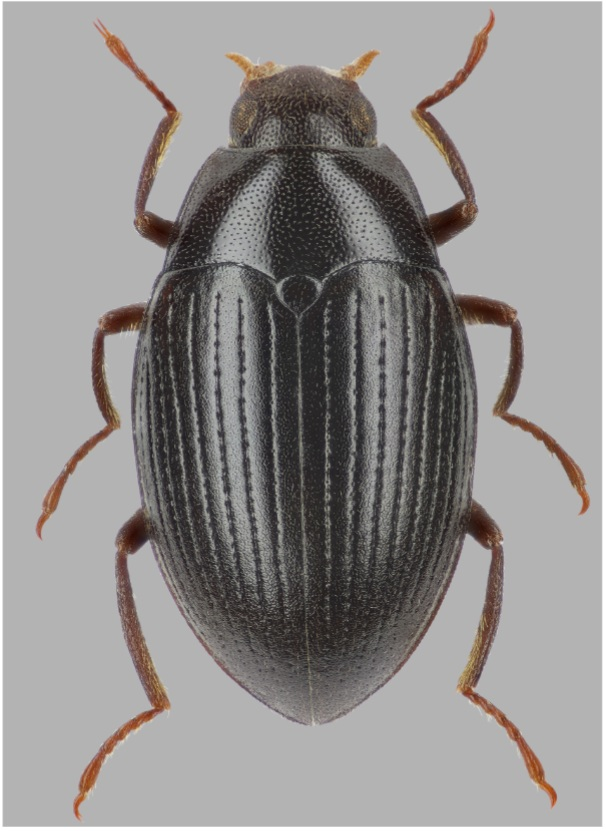

Scientific classification
- Kingdom: Animalia
- Phylum: Arthropoda
- Class: Insecta
- Order: Coleoptera
- Suborder: Polyphaga
- Infraorder: Elateriformia
- Family: Dryopidae
- Genus: Elmomorphus
- Species: E. vietnamensis

Binomial name
- Elmomorphus vietnamensis Kodada, Selnekovič & Jäch, 2024

= Elmomorphus vietnamensis =

Species of beetle

Elmomorphus vietnamensis is a species of beetle of the family Dryopidae. This species is found in Vietnam.

== Description ==
Adults reach a length of 3.14–3.34 mm (males) and 3.36–3.47 mm (females). Their body is broadly oval, widest before midlength of the elytra. The colour is dark brown to black, while the mouthparts and antennae are reddish brown and the trochanters, tarsi, and distal portions of femora are usually dark brown.

== Etymology ==
The species name refers to Vietnam.
