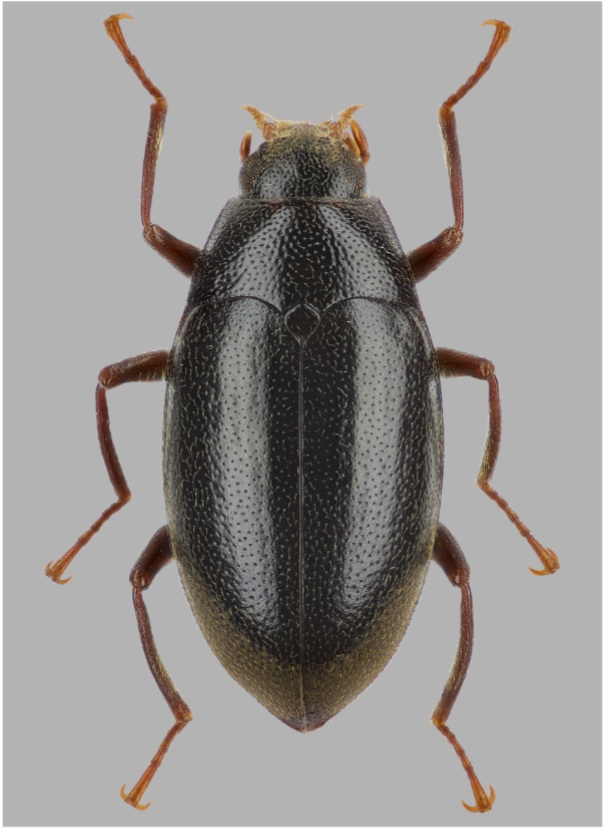

Scientific classification
- Kingdom: Animalia
- Phylum: Arthropoda
- Class: Insecta
- Order: Coleoptera
- Suborder: Polyphaga
- Infraorder: Elateriformia
- Family: Dryopidae
- Genus: Elmomorphus
- Species: E. simplipes

Binomial name
- Elmomorphus simplipes Kodada, Selnekovič & Jäch, 2024

= Elmomorphus simplipes =

Species of beetle

Elmomorphus simplipes is a species of beetle of the family Dryopidae. This species is found in Vietnam.

== Description ==
Adults reach a length of 2.59–2.97 mm (males) and 2.91–3.19 mm (females). Their body is narrowly oval, convex dorsally, widest before midlength of elytra and integument dark brown to black, while the mouthparts, antennae, trochanters, and tarsi are reddish brown.

== Etymology ==
The species name is Latin and refers the tibiae lacking teeth, swellings, or apical expansions.
