= Helichus suturalis =

Scientific classification
- Domain: Eukaryota
- Kingdom: Animalia
- Phylum: Arthropoda
- Class: Insecta
- Order: Coleoptera
- Suborder: Polyphaga
- Infraorder: Elateriformia
- Family: Dryopidae
- Genus: Helichus
- Species: H. suturalis

Binomial name
- Helichus suturalis Leconte, 1852

Species of beetle

Helichus suturalis is a species of long-toed water beetle in the family Dryopidae. It is found in Central America and North America.
