= Dryops similaris =

Scientific classification
- Kingdom: Animalia
- Phylum: Arthropoda
- Clade: Pancrustacea
- Class: Insecta
- Order: Coleoptera
- Suborder: Polyphaga
- Infraorder: Elateriformia
- Family: Dryopidae
- Genus: Dryops
- Species: D. similaris

Binomial name
- Dryops similaris Bollow, 1936

Species of beetle

Dryops similaris

Dryops similaris is a species of beetle belonging to the family Dryopidae.

It is native to Europe. It lives in river basins.
