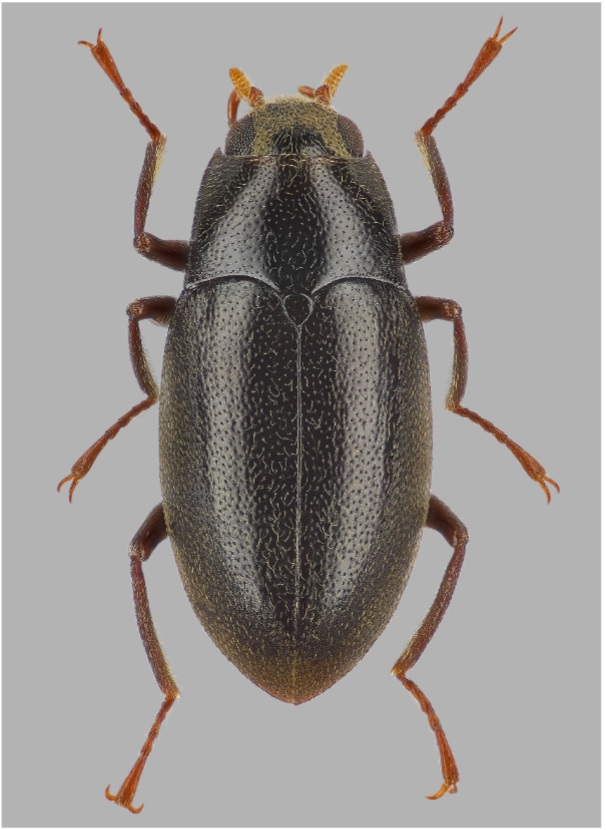

Scientific classification
- Kingdom: Animalia
- Phylum: Arthropoda
- Class: Insecta
- Order: Coleoptera
- Suborder: Polyphaga
- Infraorder: Elateriformia
- Family: Dryopidae
- Genus: Elmomorphus
- Species: E. parvulus

Binomial name
- Elmomorphus parvulus Kodada, Selnekovič & Jäch, 2024

= Elmomorphus parvulus =

Species of beetle

Elmomorphus parvulus is a species of beetle of the family Dryopidae. This species is found in Thailand.

== Description ==
Adults reach a length of 2.41–2.62 mm (males) and 2.60–2.81 mm (females). Their body is elongate oval and integument black, while the mouthparts, antennae, trochanters and tarsi are reddish brown and the remaining parts of the legs are dark brown.

== Etymology ==
The species name is derived from Latin parvulus (meaning very small) and refers to the very small size of the species compared to the most similar congeners.
