= Helichus striatus =

Scientific classification
- Domain: Eukaryota
- Kingdom: Animalia
- Phylum: Arthropoda
- Class: Insecta
- Order: Coleoptera
- Suborder: Polyphaga
- Infraorder: Elateriformia
- Family: Dryopidae
- Genus: Helichus
- Species: H. striatus

Binomial name
- Helichus striatus LeConte, 1852

Species of beetle

Helichus striatus is a species of long-toed water beetle in the family Dryopidae. It is found on debris and under rocks in cool streams from South Carolina to Quebec, and west to California and British Columbia.

== Subspecies ==
These two subspecies belong to the species Helichus striatus:

- Helichus striatus foveatus LeConte, 1852^{i c g}
- Helichus striatus striatus LeConte, 1852^{i c g}

Data sources: i = ITIS, c = Catalogue of Life, g = GBIF, b = Bugguide.net
