= Dryops viennensis =

Conservation status
- Unranked (NatureServe)

Scientific classification
- Kingdom: Animalia
- Phylum: Arthropoda
- Clade: Pancrustacea
- Class: Insecta
- Order: Coleoptera
- Suborder: Polyphaga
- Infraorder: Elateriformia
- Family: Dryopidae
- Genus: Dryops
- Species: D. viennensis

Binomial name
- Dryops viennensis (Laporte, 1840)

Synonyms
- Dryops viennensis (Heer, 1841); Parnus viennensis Laporte de Castelnau, 1840

Species of beetle

Dryops viennensis, also known as the cobblestone long-toed water beetle, is a species of water beetle in the family Dryopidae. It is a western Palearctic (European) species that is advective in western North America (New Brunswick, Quebec, New Hampshire).
