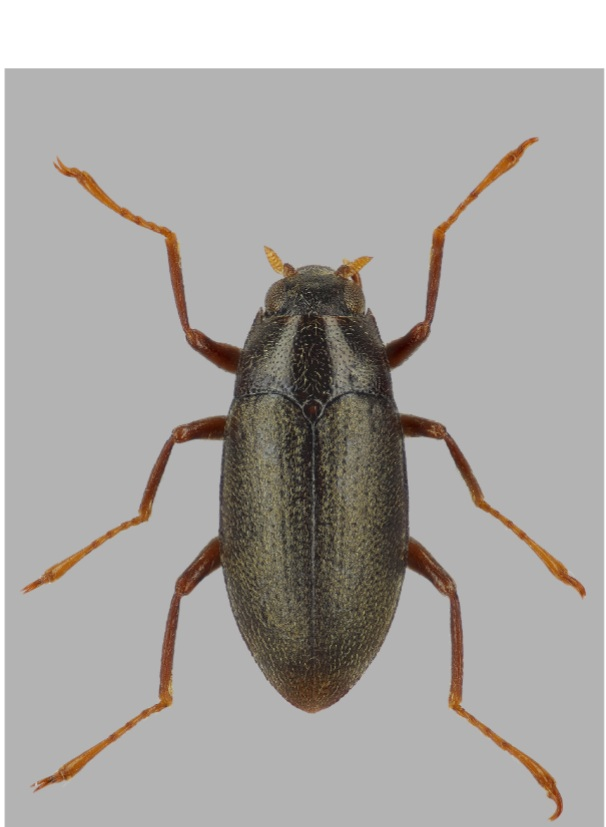

Scientific classification
- Kingdom: Animalia
- Phylum: Arthropoda
- Class: Insecta
- Order: Coleoptera
- Suborder: Polyphaga
- Infraorder: Elateriformia
- Family: Dryopidae
- Genus: Elmomorphus
- Species: E. horaki

Binomial name
- Elmomorphus horaki Kodada, Selnekovič & Jäch, 2024

= Elmomorphus horaki =

Species of beetle

Elmomorphus horaki is a species of beetle of the Dryopidae family. This species is found in Cambodia, Myanmar, Thailand and Vietnam.

== Description ==
Adults reach a length of 2.21–2.67 mm (males) and 2.21–2.89 mm (females). Their body is elongate oval and black, except for the mouthparts, antennae, tarsi and trochanters which are reddish-brown. The remaining parts of the legs are brown.

== Etymology ==
The species is named for Jan Horák, a Czech entomologist who provided interesting material from Thailand.
