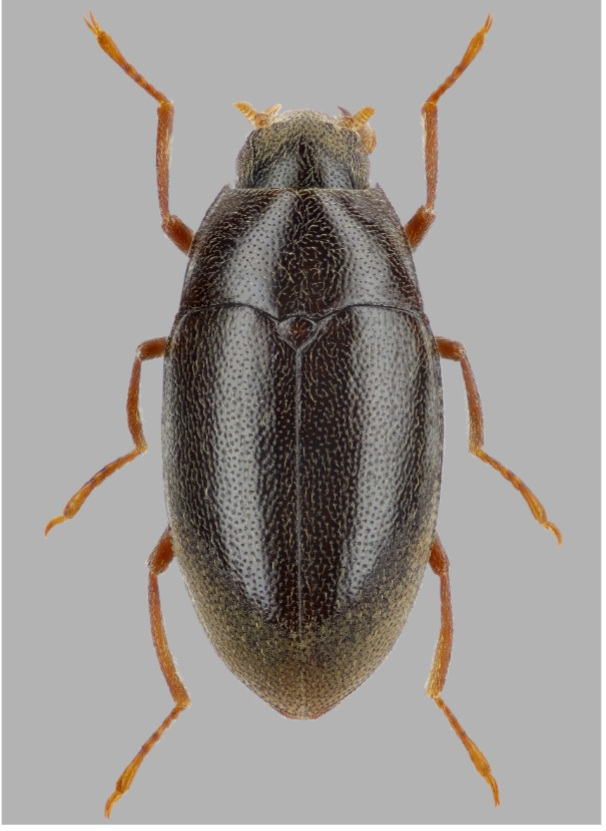

Scientific classification
- Kingdom: Animalia
- Phylum: Arthropoda
- Class: Insecta
- Order: Coleoptera
- Suborder: Polyphaga
- Infraorder: Elateriformia
- Family: Dryopidae
- Genus: Elmomorphus
- Species: E. punctulatus

Binomial name
- Elmomorphus punctulatus Kodada, Selnekovič & Jäch, 2024

= Elmomorphus punctulatus =

Species of beetle

Elmomorphus punctulatus is a species of beetle of the family Dryopidae. This species is found in China (Yunnan).

== Description ==
Adults reach a length of 2.55–2.68 mm (males) and 2.65–2.95 mm (females). Their body is oval, strongly convex dorsally and integument brown to black, while the trochanters, tarsi, antennae, and mouthparts are paler.

== Etymology ==
The species name is Latin (meaning punctulate) and refers to the relatively dense punctation on pronotum and elytra.
