= Pelonomus =

Scientific classification
- Kingdom: Animalia
- Phylum: Arthropoda
- Class: Insecta
- Order: Coleoptera
- Suborder: Polyphaga
- Infraorder: Elateriformia
- Family: Dryopidae
- Genus: Pelonomus; Erichson, 1847

Synonyms
- Oberonus Casey, 1893; Parnoides Kuwert, 1900

Genus of beetles

Pelonomus is a genus of long-toed water beetles in the family Dryopidae. There are about five described species in the genus Pelonomus.

== Species ==
These five species belong to the genus Pelonomus:

- Pelonomus griseus Blatchley & Leng, 1916
- Pelonomus impressiventris Blatchl. & Leng, 1916
- Pelonomus obscurus Leconte, 1852
- Pelonomus palpalis Sharp, 1882
- Pelonomus picipes (Olivier, 1791)
