= Ceradryops =

Scientific classification
- Domain: Eukaryota
- Kingdom: Animalia
- Phylum: Arthropoda
- Class: Insecta
- Order: Coleoptera
- Suborder: Polyphaga
- Infraorder: Elateriformia
- Family: Dryopidae
- Genus: Ceradryops; Hinton, 1937

Genus of beetles

Ceradryops is a genus of long-toe water beetles in the family Dryopidae. There are three described species in this genus.

== Species ==
- Ceradryops punctatus Hinton, 1937 (India, Sri Lanka)
- Ceradryops himalayanus (Sato, 1981) (Nepal)
- Ceradryops matei Kodada & Boukal 2003 (Hong Kong)
