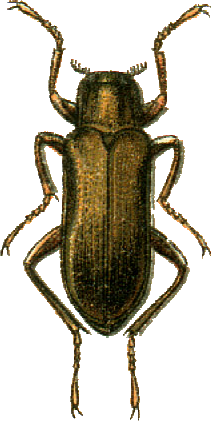

Scientific classification
- Domain: Eukaryota
- Kingdom: Animalia
- Phylum: Arthropoda
- Class: Insecta
- Order: Coleoptera
- Suborder: Polyphaga
- Infraorder: Elateriformia
- Family: Dryopidae
- Genus: Dryops; Olivier, 1791

Synonyms
- Parnus Fabricius, 1792

= Dryops (beetle) =

Genus of beetles

Dryops is a genus of long-toed water beetles in the family Dryopidae. There are at least 20 described species in the genus Dryops.

== Species ==
These 24 species belong to the genus Dryops:

- Dryops algiricus (Lucas, 1846)^{g}
- Dryops anglicanus Edwards, 1909^{g}
- Dryops arizonensis (Schaeffer, 1905)^{i c g b}
- Dryops auriculatus (Geoffroy, 1785)^{g}
- Dryops caspius (Menetries, 1832)^{g}
- Dryops championi Dodero, 1918^{g}
- Dryops costae (Heyden, 1891)^{g}
- Dryops doderoi Bollow, 1936^{g}
- Dryops ernesti Des Gozis, 1886^{g}
- Dryops femorata Fabricius, 1792^{g}
- Dryops gracilis (Karsch, 1881)^{g}
- Dryops griseus (Erichson, 1847)^{g}
- Dryops luridus (Erichson, 1847)^{i c g}
- Dryops lutulentus (Erichson, 1847)^{g}
- Dryops nitidulus (Heer, 1841)^{g}
- Dryops raffrayi (Grouvelle, 1898)^{g}
- Dryops renateae^{g}
- Dryops rufipes (Krynicki, 1832)^{g}
- Dryops similaris Bollow, 1936^{g}
- Dryops striatellus (Fairmaire & Brisout, 1859)^{g}
- Dryops striatopunctatus (Heer, 1841)^{g}
- Dryops subincanus (Kuwert, 1890)^{g}
- Dryops sulcipennis (A.Costa, 1883)^{g}
- Dryops viennensis (Heer, 1841)^{i c g b}

Data sources: i = ITIS, c = Catalogue of Life, g = GBIF, b = Bugguide.net
