= Elmomorphus montanus =

Scientific classification
- Kingdom: Animalia
- Phylum: Arthropoda
- Class: Insecta
- Order: Coleoptera
- Suborder: Polyphaga
- Infraorder: Elateriformia
- Family: Dryopidae
- Genus: Elmomorphus
- Species: E. montanus

Binomial name
- Elmomorphus montanus (Grouvelle, 1913)

Synonyms
- Dryopidius montanus Grouvelle, 1913

Species of beetle

Elmomorphus montanus is a species of beetle of the family Dryopidae. This species is found in north-eastern India (Arunachal Pradesh) .

== Description ==
Adults reach a length of about 3.35 mm. Their body is elongate oval, moderately convex and black, while the mouthparts, antennae, trochanters, and tarsi are reddish brown.
