= Postelichus =

Scientific classification
- Domain: Eukaryota
- Kingdom: Animalia
- Phylum: Arthropoda
- Class: Insecta
- Order: Coleoptera
- Suborder: Polyphaga
- Infraorder: Elateriformia
- Family: Dryopidae
- Genus: Postelichus; Nelson, 1989

Genus of beetles

Postelichus is a genus of long-toed water beetles in the family Dryopidae. There are seven described species in Postelichus.

== Species ==
These seven species belong to the genus Postelichus:

- Postelichus bajaensis Barr and Shepard, 2022
- Postelichus confluentus (Hinton, 1935)
- Postelichus immsi (Hinton, 1937)
- Postelichus musgravei (Hinton, 1935)
- Postelichus productus (LeConte, 1852)
- Postelichus propinquus (Hinton, 1935)
- Postelichus thoracicus (Hinton, 1935)
