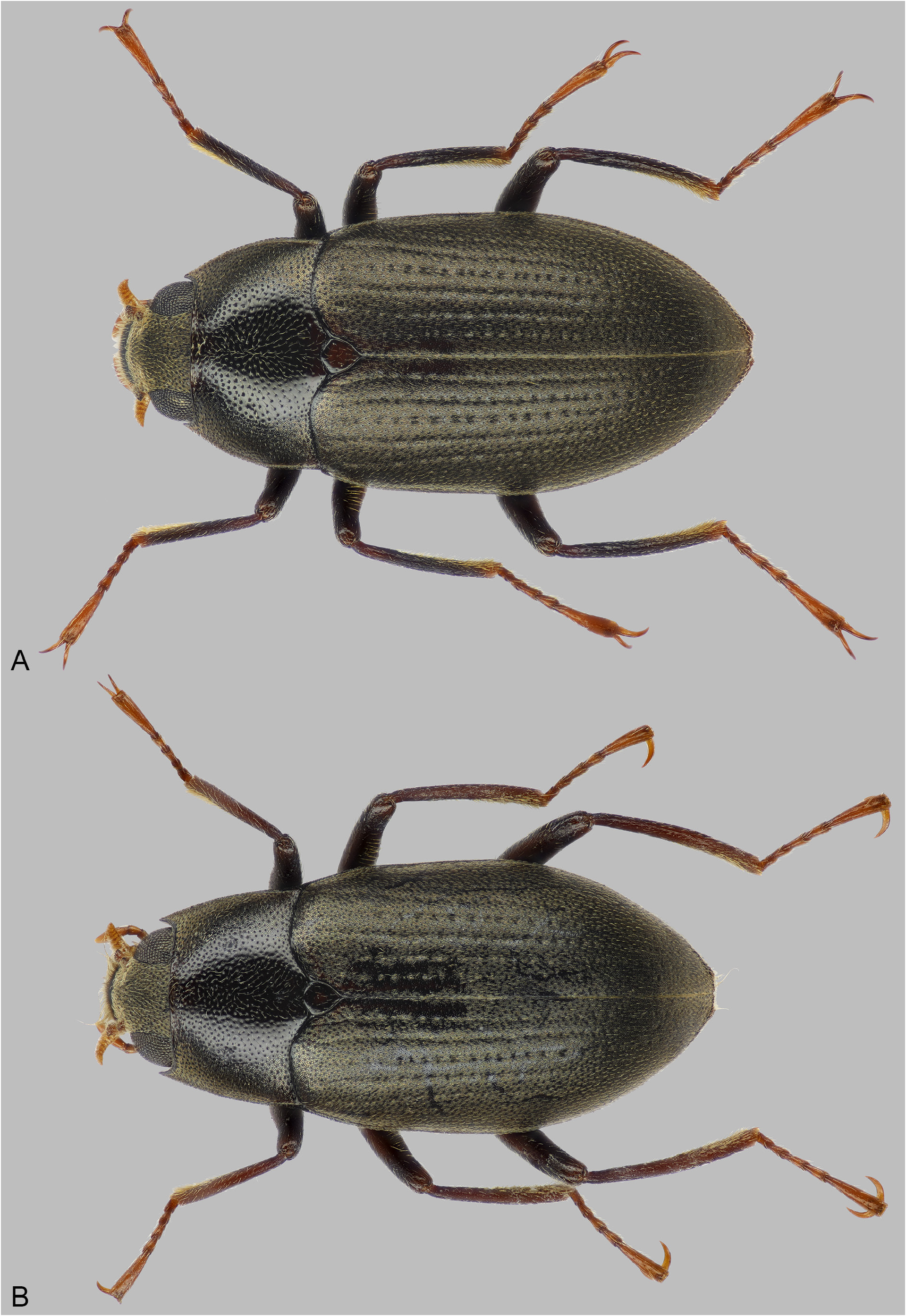
- A. Elmomorphus brevicornis - B. Elmomorphus amamiensis

Scientific classification
- Kingdom: Animalia
- Phylum: Arthropoda
- Class: Insecta
- Order: Coleoptera
- Suborder: Polyphaga
- Infraorder: Elateriformia
- Family: Dryopidae
- Genus: Elmomorphus; Sharp, 1888

Synonyms
- Dryopidius Grouvelle, 1896; Elmomorphellus Chujô & Satô, 1964

= Elmomorphus =

Genus of beetles

Elmomorphus is a genus of long-toe water beetles in the family Dryopidae.

== Selected species ==
- Elmomorphus amamiensis Nomura, 1959
- Elmomorphus auratus Kodada, Selnekovič & Jäch, 2024
- Elmomorphus auripilosus Kodada, Selnekovič & Jäch, 2024
- Elmomorphus bispinosus Kodada, Selnekovič & Jäch, 2024
- Elmomorphus brevicornis Sharp, 1888
- Elmomorphus bryanti Hinton, 1935
- Elmomorphus calvus Selnekovič, Jäch & Kodada, 2024
- Elmomorphus catenatus Kodada, Selnekovič & Jäch, 2024
- Elmomorphus comosiclunis Kodada, Selnekovič & Jäch, 2024
- Elmomorphus cuneatus Kodada, Selnekovič & Jäch, 2024
- Elmomorphus curvipes Kodada, Selnekovič & Jäch, 2024
- Elmomorphus corpulentus Selnekovič, Jäch & Kodada, 2024
- Elmomorphus dentipes Kodada, Selnekovič & Jäch, 2024
- Elmomorphus depressus Kodada, Selnekovič & Jäch, 2024
- Elmomorphus donatus Kodada, Selnekovič & Jäch, 2024
- Elmomorphus ellipticus Selnekovič, Jäch & Kodada, 2024
- Elmomorphus elmoides Selnekovič, Jäch & Kodada, 2024
- Elmomorphus hongkong Kodada, Selnekovič & Jäch, 2024
- Elmomorphus horaki Kodada, Selnekovič & Jäch, 2024
- Elmomorphus fusiformis Selnekovič, Jäch & Kodada, 2024
- Elmomorphus glabriclunis Kodada, Selnekovič & Jäch, 2024
- Elmomorphus globosus Kodada, Selnekovič & Jäch, 2024
- Elmomorphus hamatus Kodada, Selnekovič & Jäch, 2024
- Elmomorphus jendeki Kodada, Selnekovič & Jäch, 2024
- Elmomorphus jii Kodada, Selnekovič & Jäch, 2024
- Elmomorphus longitarsis Kodada, Selnekovič & Jäch, 2024
- Elmomorphus mazzoldii Selnekovič, Jäch & Kodada, 2024
- Elmomorphus minutus Kodada, Selnekovič & Jäch, 2024
- Elmomorphus montanus (Grouvelle, 1913)
- Elmomorphus nepalensis Satô, 1981
- Elmomorphus oblongus Kodada, Selnekovič & Jäch, 2024
- Elmomorphus ovalis Kodada, Selnekovič & Jäch, 2024
- Elmomorphus parabrevicornis Kodada, Selnekovič & Jäch, 2024
- Elmomorphus paradonatus Kodada, Selnekovič & Jäch, 2024
- Elmomorphus paramontanus Selnekovič, Jäch & Kodada, 2024
- Elmomorphus parvulus Kodada, Selnekovič & Jäch, 2024
- Elmomorphus prosternalis Hinton, 1935
- Elmomorphus punctulatus Kodada, Selnekovič & Jäch, 2024
- Elmomorphus reticulatus Kodada, Selnekovič & Jäch, 2024
- Elmomorphus sausai Kodada, Selnekovič & Jäch, 2024
- Elmomorphus schillhammeri Kodada, Selnekovič & Jäch, 2024
- Elmomorphus schoenmanni Kodada, Selnekovič & Jäch, 2024
- Elmomorphus siamensis Kodada, Selnekovič & Jäch, 2024
- Elmomorphus similis Kodada, Selnekovič & Jäch, 2024
- Elmomorphus simplex Kodada, Selnekovič & Jäch, 2024
- Elmomorphus simplipes Kodada, Selnekovič & Jäch, 2024
- Elmomorphus striatellus Delève, 1968
- Elmomorphus sulcatus Kodada, Selnekovič & Jäch, 2024
- Elmomorphus superficialis Kodada, Selnekovič & Jäch, 2024
- Elmomorphus umphangicus Kodada, Selnekovič & Jäch, 2024
- Elmomorphus vietnamensis Kodada, Selnekovič & Jäch, 2024
- Elmomorphus yunnanensis Kodada, Selnekovič & Jäch, 2024
