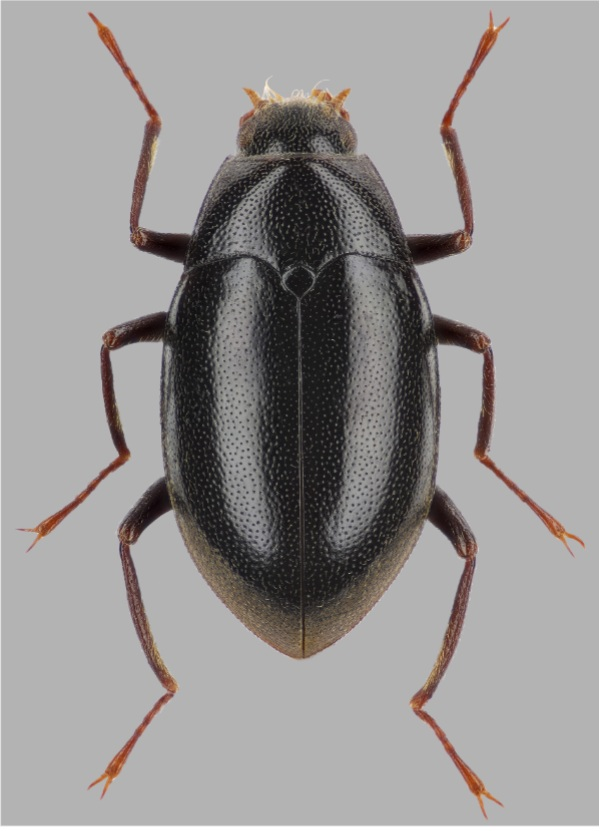

Scientific classification
- Kingdom: Animalia
- Phylum: Arthropoda
- Class: Insecta
- Order: Coleoptera
- Suborder: Polyphaga
- Infraorder: Elateriformia
- Family: Dryopidae
- Genus: Elmomorphus
- Species: E. donatus

Binomial name
- Elmomorphus donatus Kodada, Selnekovič & Jäch, 2024

= Elmomorphus donatus =

Species of beetle

Elmomorphus donatus is a species of beetle of the family Dryopidae. This species is found in China (Jiangxi, Yunnan) and Vietnam.

== Description ==
Adults reach a length of 3.09–3.50 mm (males) and 3.35–3.66 mm (females). Their body is oval, widest close before the middle of the elytra, strongly convex dorsally and integument dark brown to black. The mouthparts, antennae, trochanters, and tarsi are reddish-brown.

== Etymology ==
The species name is Latin (meaning donated) and commemorates the first Chinese specimens which were donated to J. Kodada by O. Šauša and E. Jendek in 1993.
