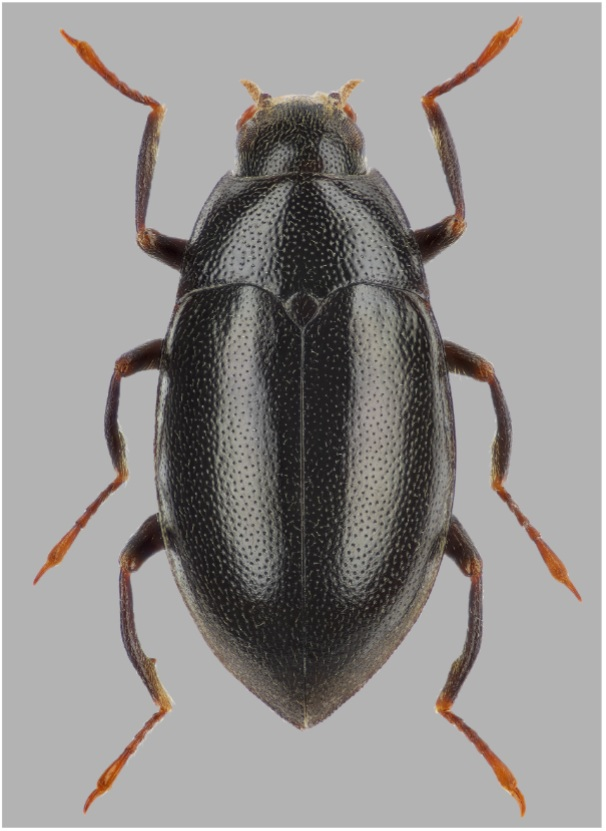

Scientific classification
- Kingdom: Animalia
- Phylum: Arthropoda
- Class: Insecta
- Order: Coleoptera
- Suborder: Polyphaga
- Infraorder: Elateriformia
- Family: Dryopidae
- Genus: Elmomorphus
- Species: E. curvipes

Binomial name
- Elmomorphus curvipes Kodada, Selnekovič & Jäch, 2024

= Elmomorphus curvipes =

Species of beetle

Elmomorphus curvipes is a species of beetle of the family Dryopidae. This species is found in China (Anhui, Fujian, Guangdong, Guangxi, Hong Kong, Hunan, Jiangxi, Yunnan, Zhejiang) and Vietnam.

== Description ==
Adults reach a length of 2.78–3.48 mm (males) and 2.83–3.45 mm (females). Their body is ovate, strongly convex dorsally and integument dark brown to black. The mouthparts, antennae, trochanters, and tarsi are light reddish brown.

== Etymology ==
The species name is a combination of the Latin words curvus (meaning curved) and pes (meaning foot, leg) and refers to the strongly curved male meso- and metatibiae.
