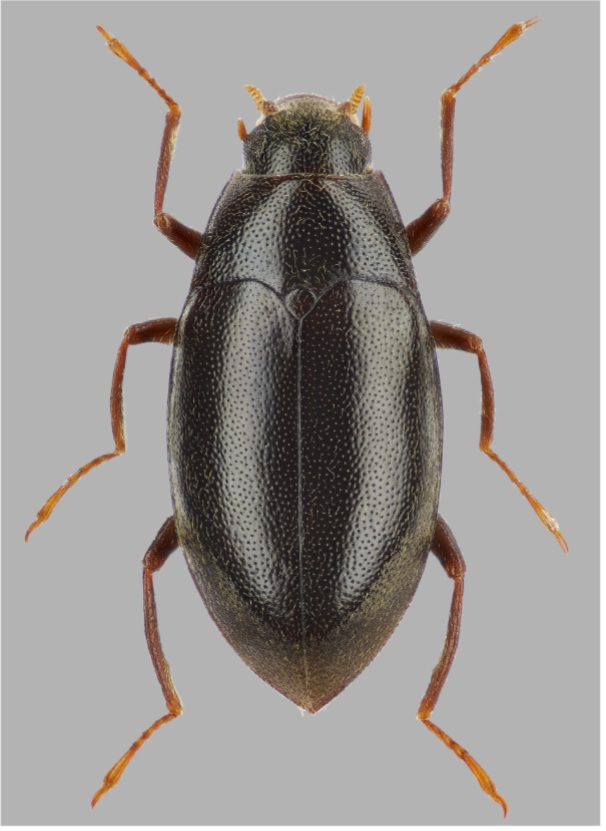

Scientific classification
- Kingdom: Animalia
- Phylum: Arthropoda
- Class: Insecta
- Order: Coleoptera
- Suborder: Polyphaga
- Infraorder: Elateriformia
- Family: Dryopidae
- Genus: Elmomorphus
- Species: E. dentipes

Binomial name
- Elmomorphus dentipes Kodada, Selnekovič & Jäch, 2024

= Elmomorphus dentipes =

Species of beetle

Elmomorphus dentipes is a species of beetle of the family Dryopidae. This species is found in China (Yunnan), Laos, Myanmar, Thailand and Vietnam.

== Description ==
Adults reach a length of 2.67–3.32 mm (males) and 2.71–3.37 mm (females). Their body is ovate, moderately convex dorsally and integument dark brown to black. The mouthparts, antennae, and legs are dark reddish brown.

== Etymology ==
The species name is a combination of the Latin words dens (meaning tooth) and pes (meaning foot, leg) and refers to the tooth on the male metatibia.
