= Helichus =

Scientific classification
- Kingdom: Animalia
- Phylum: Arthropoda
- Class: Insecta
- Order: Coleoptera
- Suborder: Polyphaga
- Infraorder: Elateriformia
- Family: Dryopidae
- Genus: Helichus; Erichson, 1847

Genus of beetles

Beetles of the genus Helichus are found worldwide apart from in Australia and Antarctica. Adults reach 1–8 millimetres (0.04–0.31 in) long and live in aquatic or riparian environments. The larvae are land-dwelling which may be unique in water living insects.

== Species ==
These 12 species belong to the genus Helichus:

- Helichus basalis LeConte, 1852^{i c g b}
- Helichus bollowi Hinton, 1936^{g}
- Helichus fastigatus^{b}
- Helichus fastigiatus (Say, 1824)^{i c g}
- Helichus frater Hinton, 1939^{g}
- Helichus lithophilus (Germar, 1824)^{i c g b}
- Helichus puncticollis Sharp, 1882^{i c g}
- Helichus pusillus Hinton, 1939^{g}
- Helichus striatus Leconte, 1852^{i c g b}
- Helichus substriatus (Müller, 1806)^{g}
- Helichus suturalis Leconte, 1852^{i c g b}
- Helichus triangularis Musgrave, 1935^{i c g}

Data sources: i = ITIS, c = Catalogue of Life, g = GBIF, b = Bugguide.net
