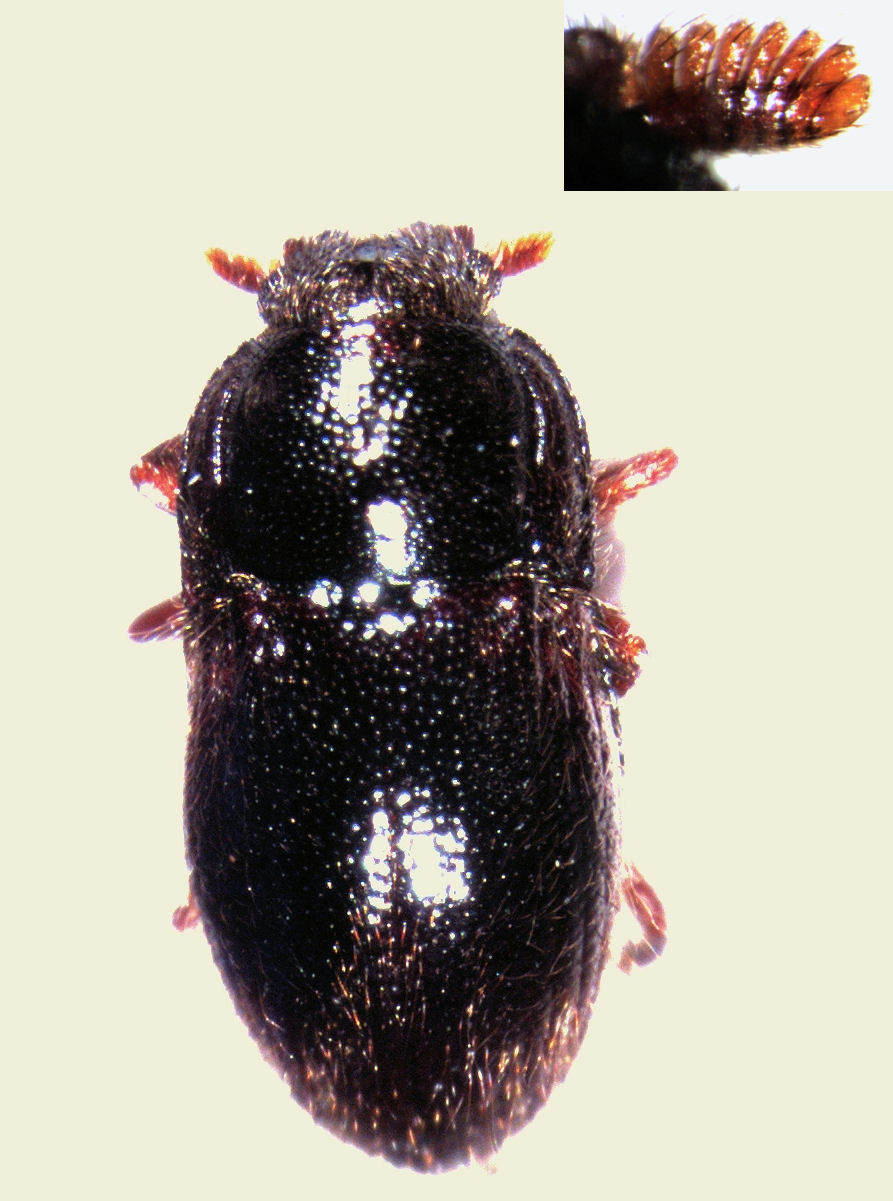
- Parnida species

Scientific classification
- Kingdom: Animalia
- Phylum: Arthropoda
- Clade: Pancrustacea
- Class: Insecta
- Order: Coleoptera
- Suborder: Polyphaga
- Infraorder: Elateriformia
- Superfamily: Byrrhoidea
- Family: Dryopidae; Billberg, 1820

= Dryopidae =

Family of beetles

Dryopidae is a family of beetles, commonly named long-toed water beetles, in the superfamily Byrrhoidea. It was described by Gustaf Johan Billberg in 1820.

== Description ==
Long-toed water beetles are named for their extended claws. Adults have dense hairs, which allow the beetles to breathe while underwater. The flight muscles of the females weaken as they age.

When the pupae complete the imago stage of their life cycle, they move towards running water, and may be attracted to lights.

Despite being referred to as aquatic insects, the beetles are unable to swim, clinging to detritus that float. All long-toed water beetles feed on plants that are in the water, but the larvae generally are terrestrial, and at least some also feed on plant matter. Stygoparnus is the only genus in the family in which both the larvae and adults are aquatic.

Genera of the family closely resemble riffle beetles, but the antennae are different from the long-toed water beetles, looking similar to clubs.

== Habitat ==
Members of this family are found on every continent, except Antarctica and Australia, being more common in the tropics. In 2005, a possible fossilized specimen of Dryopidae was found in the Crato Formation by entomologists David Grimaldi and Michael S. Engel.

Beetles that have water as a habitat, including long-toed water beetles, can help show the quality of fresh water.

== Genera ==
- Ahaggaria Bollow, 1938
- Ceradryops Hinton, 1937
- Drylichus Heller, 1916
- Dryops Olivier, 1791
- Elmomorphus Sharp, 1888
- Elmoparnus Sharp, 1882
- Geoparnus Besuchet, 1978
- Guaranius Spangler, 1991
- Helichus Erichson, 1847
- Holcodryops Spangler, 1987
- Malaiseianus Bollow, 1940
- Onopelmus Spangler, 1980
- Oreoparvus Delève, 1965
- Pelonomus Erichson, 1847
- Phallodryops Delève, 1963
- Postelichus Nelson, 1989
- Protoparnus Sharp, 1883
- Quadryops Perkins & Spangler, 1985
- Rapnus Grouvelle, 1899
- Sostea Pascoe, 1860
- Sosteamorphus Hinton, 1936
- Strina Redtenbacher, 1867
- Stygoparnus Barr & Spangler, 1992
- Uenodryops Satô, 1981
- Palaeoriohelmis Bollow, 1940
- Potamophilites Haupt, 1956
