= Red velvet cake =

Red layer cake with icing

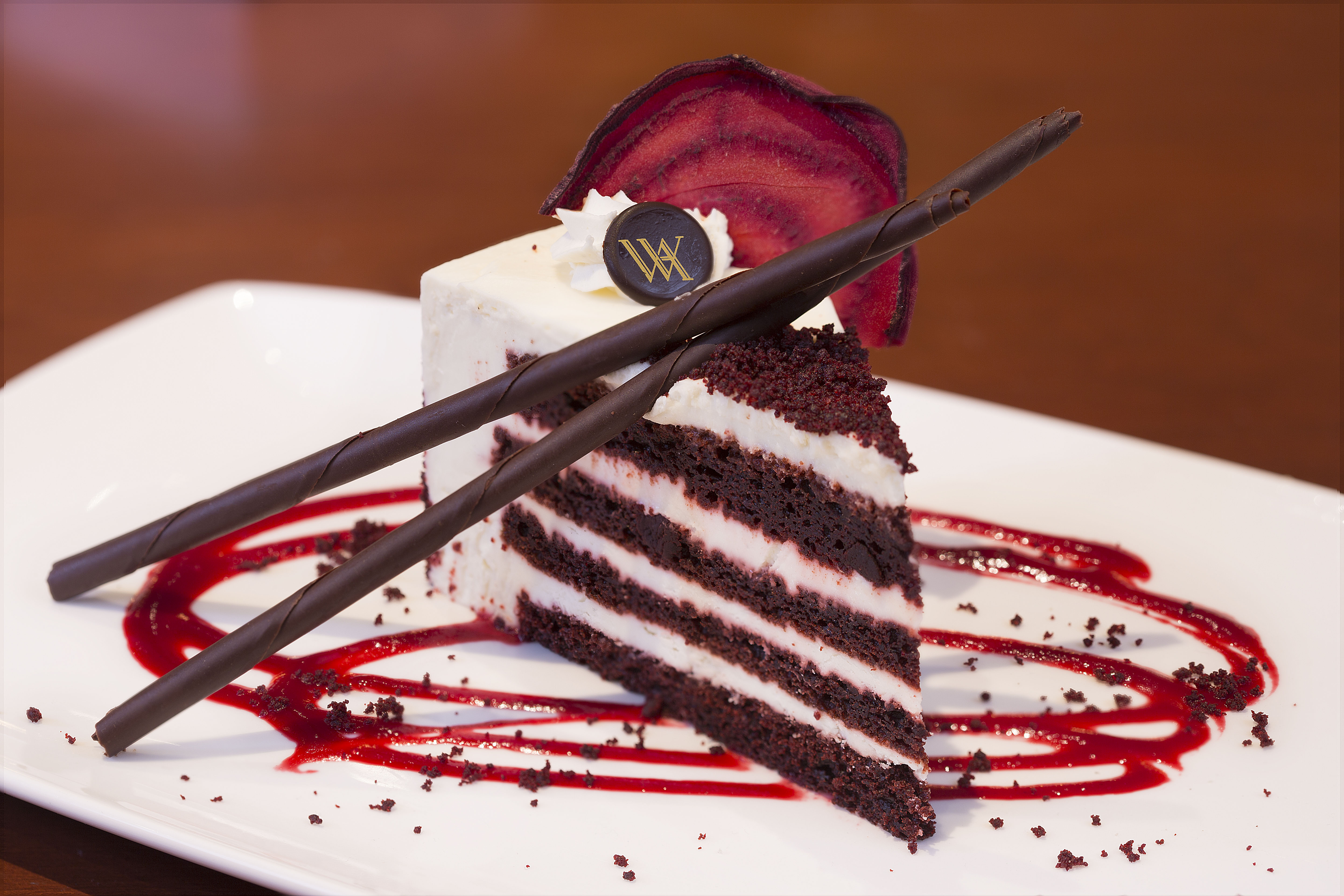
- A four-layer slice of red velvet cake
- Type: Cake
- Course: Dessert
- Place of origin: United States or Canada
- Main ingredients: Baking powder; butter; buttermilk or vinegar; cocoa powder; eggs; flour; salt; vanilla extract; cream cheese or ermine icing

Red velvet cake is a red-colored layer cake with cream cheese or ermine icing. The origin of the cake is unknown, although it is popular in the Southern United States and has been served as a dessert at New York City's Waldorf-Astoria hotel since the 1920s. Both the hotel and Eaton's in Canada claim to have developed the recipe. Ingredients of the cake include baking powder, butter, buttermilk or vinegar, cocoa powder, eggs, flour, salt, vanilla extract, and, in most modern recipes, red food coloring. The cake's popularity declined after Red Dye #2 was linked to cancer in the 1970s but has since improved in the United States and elsewhere.

== History ==
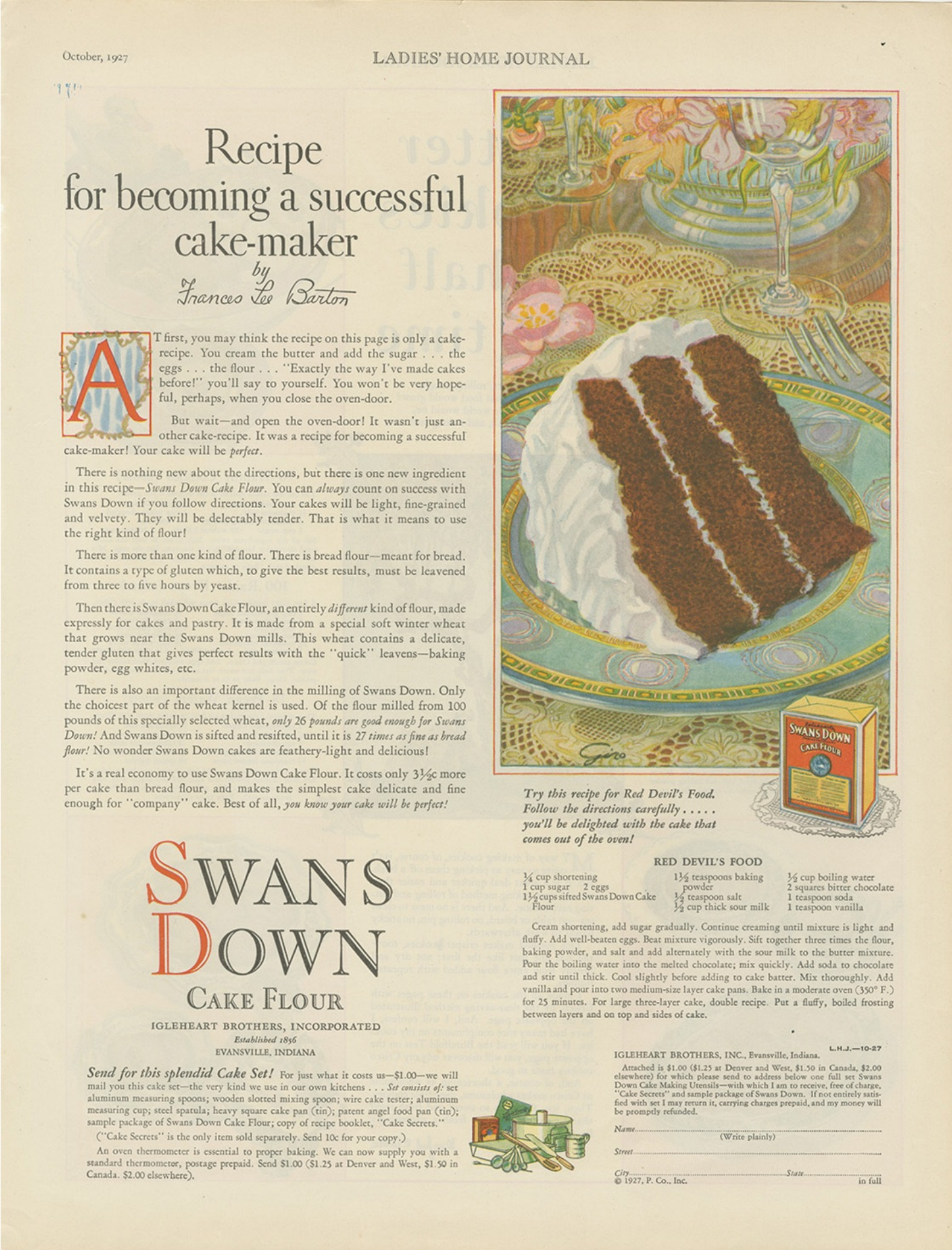
A recipe for "Red Devil's Food" from the 1927 edition of Ladies' Home Journal

It is unknown where the red velvet cake originated, although its popularity in the Southern United States dates to the early 20th century. Recipes for "velvet" cakes, so called because of the fineness of their crumb texture, date to the 19th century but include a variety of types of cake, including shortcakes and pancakes, whose recipes included ingredients such as almond flour, cocoa powder or corn starch to soften the wheat flour proteins and make finer-textured cakes. At the time, brown sugar, which was also called red sugar, was more readily and cheaply available than white sugar, and may have turned the cakes "vaguely reddish," according to pastry chef and food writer Stella Parks.

Additionally, in the 19th century, the first recipes for chocolate cakes appeared, with some including buttermilk, which, when combined with raw cocoa powder, would turn the batter and resulting cake a naturally occurring burgundy hue. Cakes from this type of recipe include the devil's food cake, mahogany cake, and oxblood cake. According to Parks, the concept of a velvet cocoa powder cake originated in the early 20th century when the recipes for mahogany cake and devil's food cake were merged. During World War I and the Great Depression, cakes made with beetroot were red, while chocolate cakes made with beetroot were burgundy-colored.

In the 1920s, red velvet layer cake became a famous dessert at New York City's Waldorf-Astoria hotel. According to John Harrisson and John Doherty, the authors of the Waldorf-Astoria Cookbook, the cake is considered a Southern recipe. When food dye was in development in the 1930s, manufacturers marketed it by creating recipes that featured it to enhance naturally occurring colors from other ingredients. One such recipe was developed during World War II by the Adams Extract company; the owners created it based on the mahogany cake with ermine icing after eating the cake at Waldorf-Astoria. Their recipe thereafter became known throughout the country. By the 1960s, recipes for red velvet cake appeared in newspapers and multiple cookbooks. Starting in the 1970s after Red Dye #2 was linked to cancer, the cake became less popular. In the late 20th century, the cake regained popularity as a result of the 1989 film Steel Magnolias, which featured the cake in a scene. By 2000, red velvet cakes were experiencing widespread popularity. However, with most recipes including chocolate, food writer Stephen Schmidt described their appearance as "often more ruddy than truly red."

In Canada, the cake was popular in the 1940s and 1950s. It was featured at restaurants inside Eaton's department store in Toronto and was widely attributed as a favorite of Flora Eaton. The Lunch with Lady Eaton cookbook refers to it as an "exclusive sweet recipe of Eaton's." The Waldorf-Astoria also claims to have created the cake.

== Ingredients and preparation ==
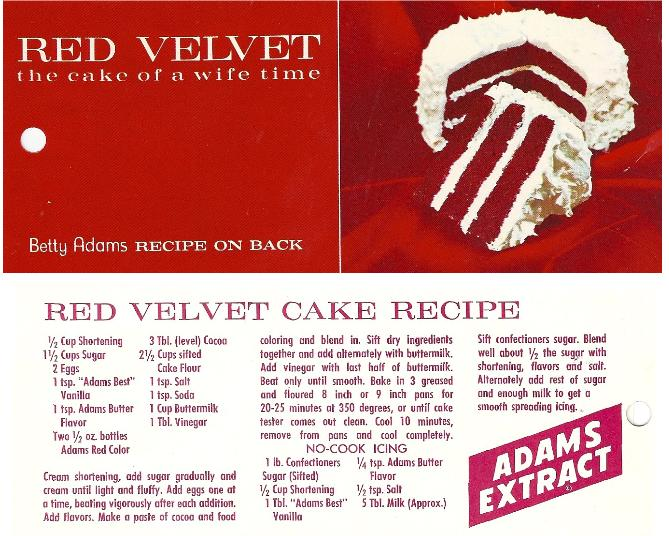
The red velvet cake recipe by Adams Extract

The primary ingredients of red velvet cake are baking powder, butter, buttermilk, cocoa powder, eggs, flour, sugar, salt, vanilla extract, vinegar, and, in modern recipes, red food coloring.

The batter is made by first creaming together butter, sugar, eggs, and vanilla extract. Separately, cocoa powder and red food coloring are combined and then integrated into the mixture. The remaining ingredients are then added, mixed, and blended. After pouring the batter into a cake pan, the cake is baked for 20 to 25 minutes and cooled before adding icing between the layers. Most modern recipes call for a cream cheese frosting, but some recipes call for ermine icing.

=== Variations ===
Chef Pamela Moxley's beetroot variation has beetroot, lemon juice, and goat cheese as additional ingredients. According to the variation's recipe, beetroots are chopped into pieces about the size of finely diced onions and added to the batter. The recipe uses non-acidic Dutch process cocoa powder, so lemon juice is added to increase the acidity and help produce a bright red color. Goat cheese is then combined with the cream cheese frosting. Other cake variations include red velvet bundt cake, doberge cake, ice cream cake and cheesecake. Non-cake alternatives of red velvet cake include red velvet cookies, brownies, cinnamon rolls, lattes, teas, waffles, Pop-Tarts, and sundaes. The flavor has also been used in protein powders and vodkas and the scent in candles and air fresheners.

== In popular culture ==
The 1989 film Steel Magnolias featured an armadillo-shaped red velvet cake, which helped to renew interest in the cake. In 2002, the singers Jessica Simpson and Nick Lachey used a red velvet cake as their wedding cake. Eventually, it became trendy in upscale bakeries. The research director of Packaged Facts, a food research publisher, notes that the cake accounted for 1.5% of all menu items in the United States in 2009, and by 2013, 4.1%. According to Kim Severson of The New York Times, the cake had become "a national commercial obsession" by 2014; she described the cake as having "got its sleeve caught in the American food merchandising machine."

In 2021, food writer G. Daniela Galarza, writing in The Washington Post, reported that red velvet cake was often served at events associated with the color red, including Christmas, Valentine's Day, and Juneteenth celebrations. However, it is not a cake otherwise closely associated with African-American culture. Although the cake is often considered a Southern cake, chef Virginia Willis described categorizing the cake as part of Southern cuisine as "insulting on some level culturally."

== Reception ==
American chef James Beard considered red velvet cake bland and uninteresting, though he nevertheless published a recipe for it in his 1972 book James Beard's American Cookery. Angie Mosier of the Southern Foodways Alliance said, "It's the Dolly Parton of cakes: a little bit tacky, but you love her."
