= Adams Extract =

Adams Extract & Spice, LLC (dba: Adams Flavors, Foods & Ingredients)
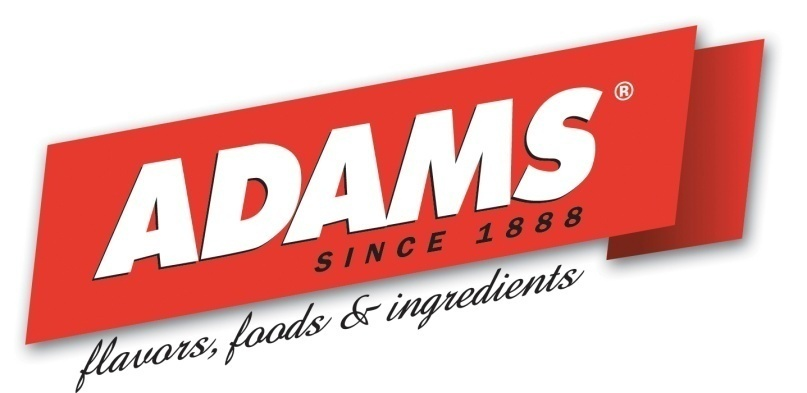
- Type: Private Company
- Industry: Processed & Packaged goods
- Founded: Battle Creek, Michigan (1888)
- Headquarters: Gonzales, Texas, U.S.
- Products: Spices, herbs, flavorings
- Number of employees: 170
- Website: www.adamsextract.com

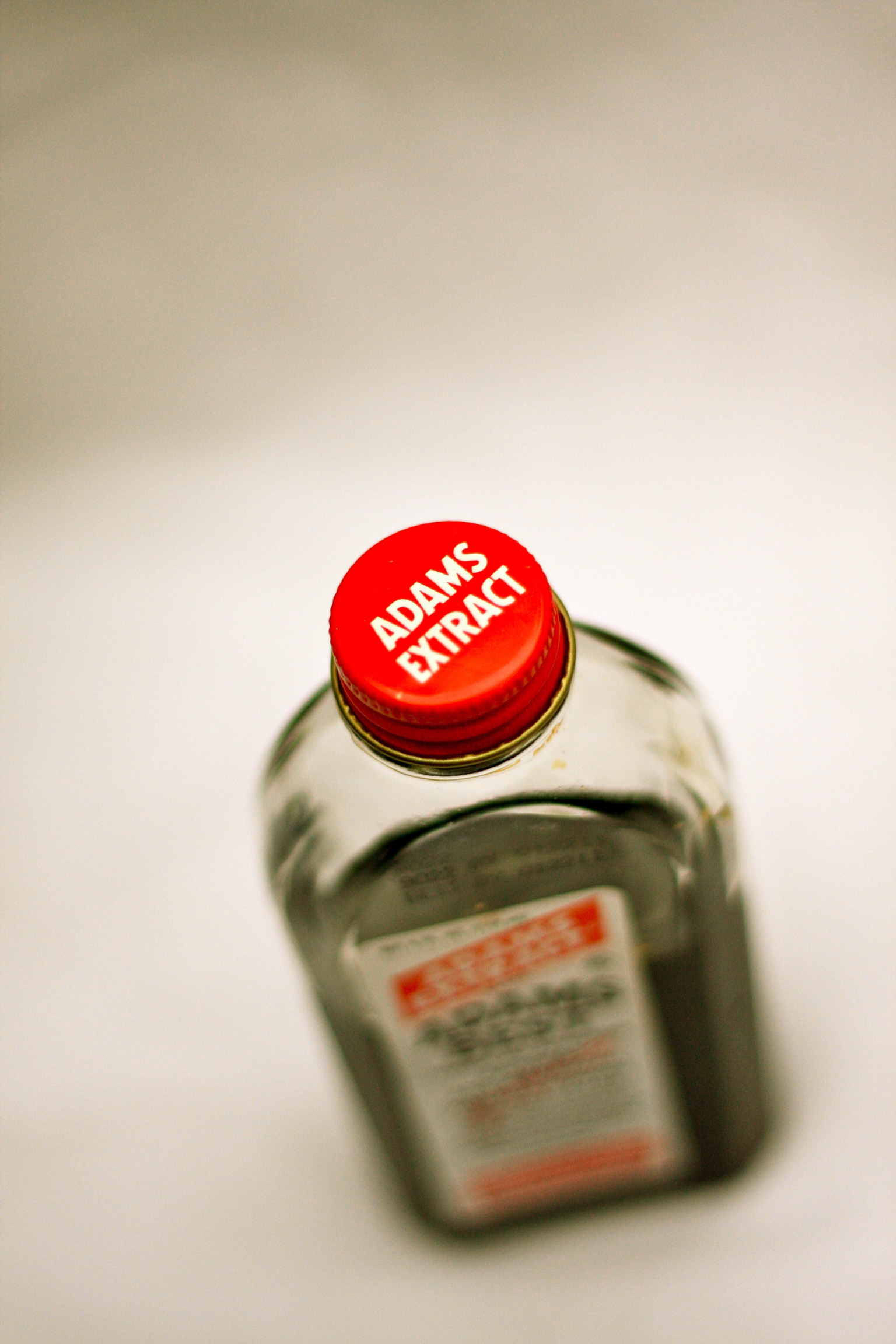
Adams Best Vanilla

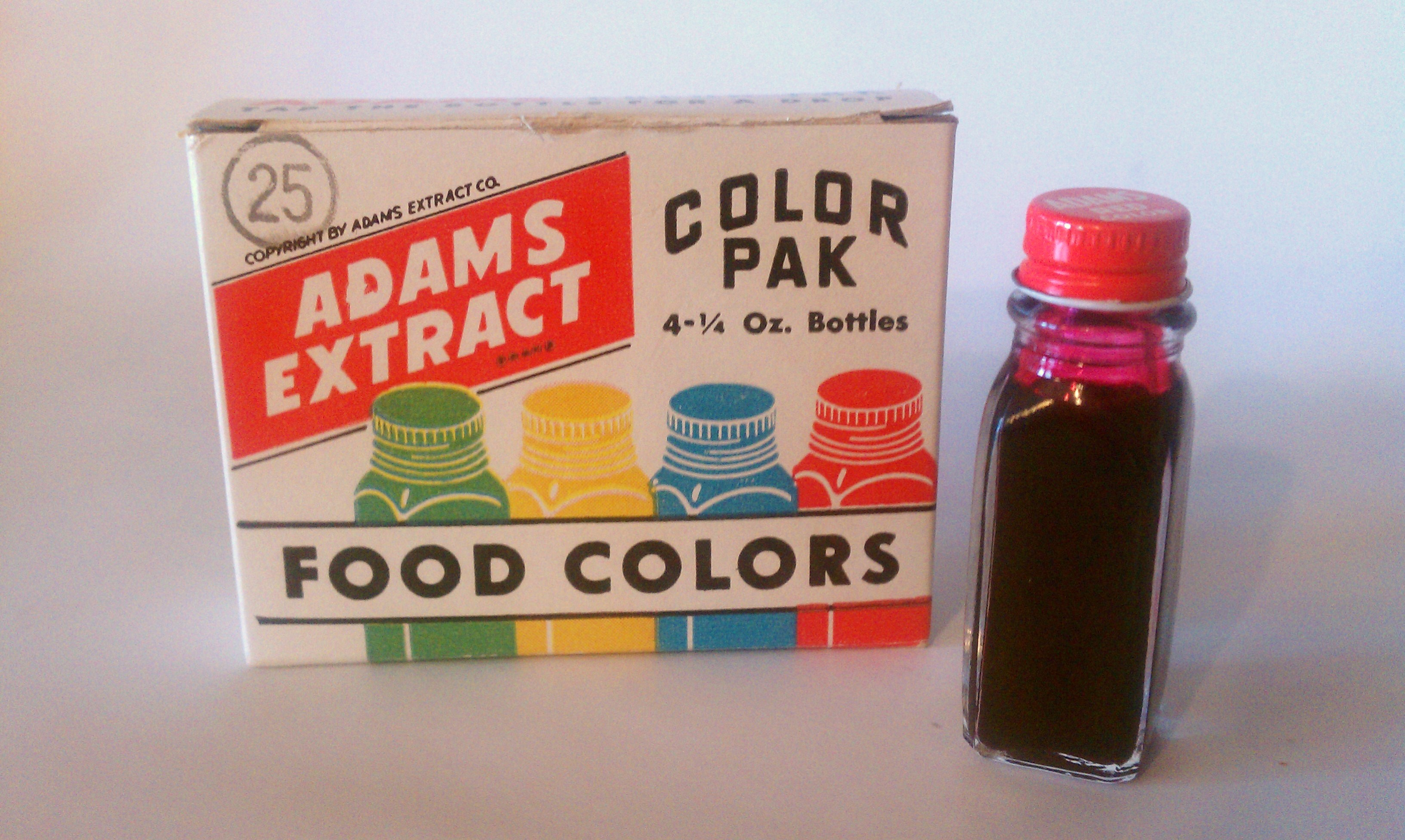
Adams 4-pack color box circa 1950

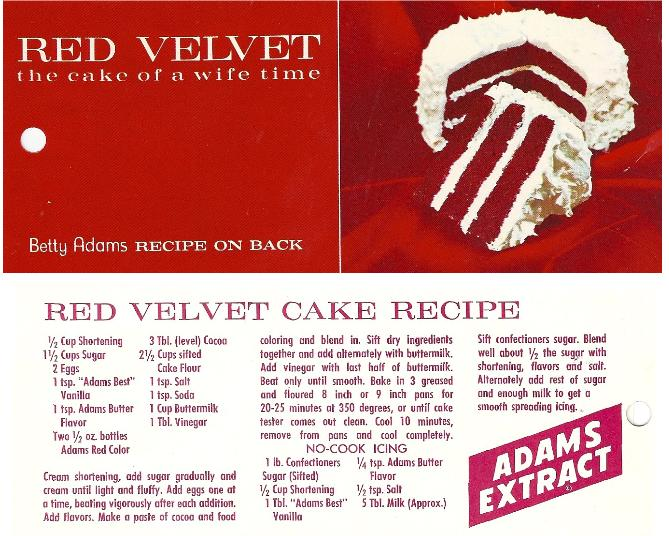
Original Adams Red Velvet Free Recipe Card circa 1969

Adams Extract, owned by Adams Extract & Spice, LLC (dba: Adams Flavors, Foods & Ingredients LLC), operates a full-service spice and extract packaging and manufacturing facility in Gonzales, Texas. Best known for its Adams Best Vanilla, it also sells product under the Adams Spice, Adams Extract, and Adams Reserve brands. In addition, Adams spices, extract and seasoning blends are found in many private label brands around the country as well as being used to season many commercially produced meat and food products.

Founded in 1888, Adams is one of the oldest continuously operated companies in Texas and one of the oldest spice and extract companies in the United States.

== History ==
John Anderson Adams, began making and selling extracts in Michigan in 1888. In 1905, he moved the family to Beeville, Texas. His wife was unhappy with the quality of the vanilla extract products available because she felt like they either baked or froze out. Mr. Adams decided to formulate one for her. When his wife tried the product, she was delighted and John replied, "Well, that's old man Adam's best." His vanilla extract became known as Adams Best Vanilla.

Mr. Adams, along with the help of his sons, Fred and Don, began to produce, package, and sell the vanilla extract door-to-door with a complete money back guarantee. After being the first to be awarded a Bachelor of Business Administration degree from University of Texas at Austin, Fred purchased the company from his father and relocated the production headquarters to Austin, Texas. In 1922, he built a two-story building downtown and continued production of the extracts and colors. Adams Extract is credited for having brought the Red Velvet Cake to kitchens across America during the time of the Great Depression by being one of the first to sell red food color and other flavor extracts with the use of point-of-sale posters and tear-off recipe cards. His son, John G. Adams, Sr., worked in the family business throughout his childhood. Following a break when he completed a BA at from the University of Texas at Austin (Chemistry), he returned expand the lines produced. In 1947, he created the assorted food color 4-pack line sold today.

In 1955, the company built a new plant on I-35, designed by the famous architecture firm Lundgren and Maurer. This plant helped expand the product line in 1959 to include spices. During this time, Betty Adams would played a big role in the company's recipe development. Her name can be found on many of the original recipes boasted by the company including the "Adams 75th Anniversary Poundcake" or more commonly known as the Five Flavor Cake.

In 2000, architecture students at The University of Texas at Austin helped the Adams Extract Company design a new manufacturing campus at Buda, Texas, south of Austin.

The Adams Extract building in Austin, Texas continued production under direction of family member John G. Adams, Sr., until 2002; the company was purchased and relocated to a facility to Gonzales, Texas. It's product line still includes: a full line of spices, the Adams Best Vanilla and food coloring.

In 2009, the movie Extract (film) was released and based on the childhood memories creator and director Mike Judge had of the Adams Extract Plant in Austin, Texas.

In mid-July 2011, Adams Best Vanilla, six other extracts, and food colors were added as a feature product in the popular Apple iTunes app, "Cupcakes!".

In January 2013, Adams Extract & Spice, was awarded the Texas Treasure Business Award, nominated by Senator Glenn Hegar and Representative John Kuempel. Created in the 79th Texas Legislature in 2005 with passage of Senate Bill 920, the program recognizes the accomplishments of Texas businesses that have provided employment opportunities and support to the state's economy for at least 50 years and pays tribute to the state's well-established businesses and their exceptional historical contributions toward the state's economic growth and prosperity. This award was presented to the company, on January 25, 2013, in front of the Alamo in San Antonio at their 125th Birthday Celebration.

== Other related information ==
The University Star, a student-run newspaper at Texas State University in San Marcos, Texas, was established in 1911 by Fred Adams, second owner of Adams Extract Co.
