= Lamugin =

Ghanaian non-alcoholic drink

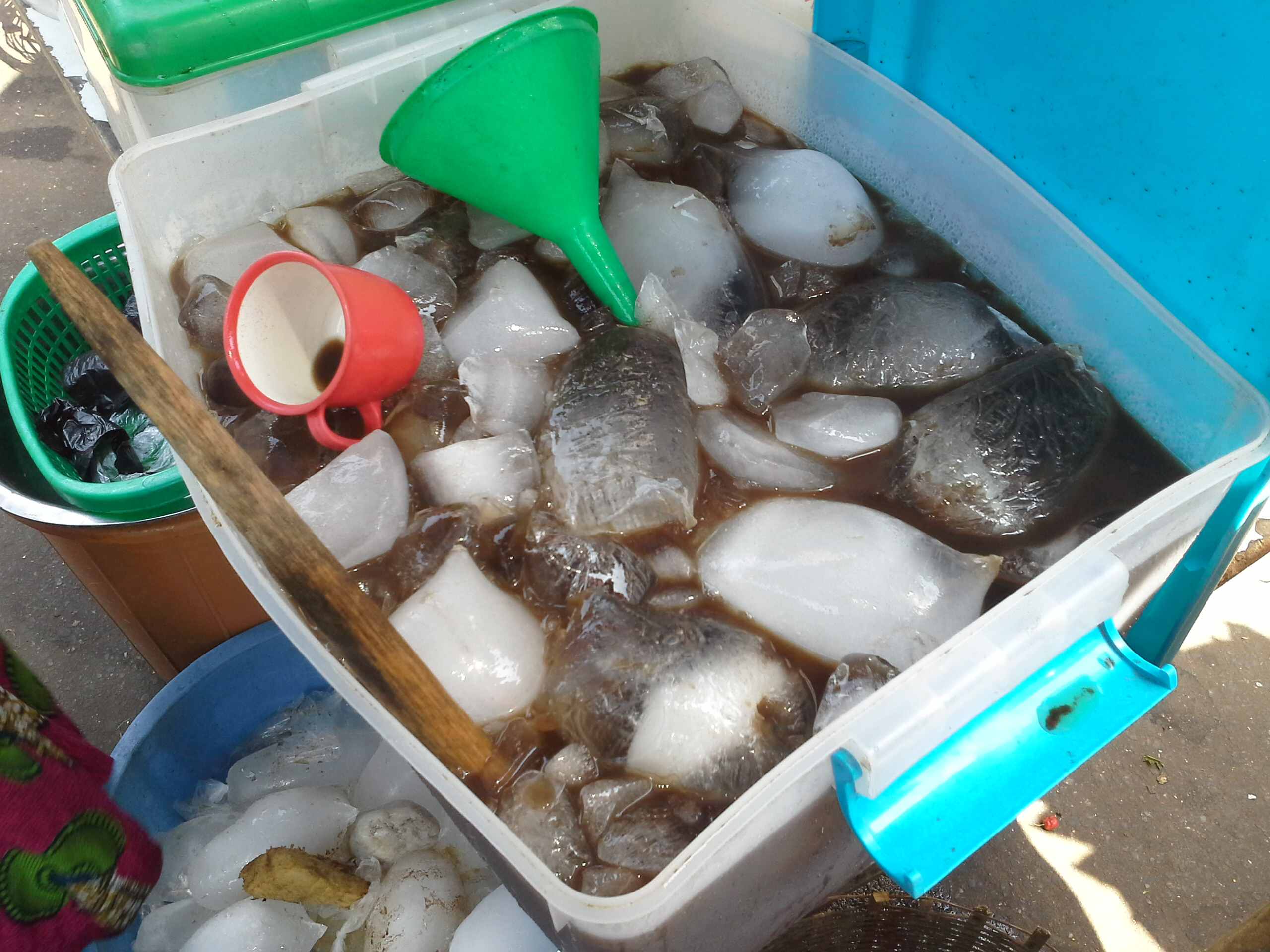
A picture of Lamugin

Lamougin is a local non-alcoholic drink that is mainly made with ginger and rice. It is very popular in the northern part of Ghana and some parts of southern Ghana. It is also known as 'Hausa beer'.

== Ingredients ==
- Ginger
- Rice or Millet
- Vanilla essence (optional)
- Cloves
- Water
- Sugar
- Tamarind also known as 'Samia' in Hausa language.

== Method of preparation ==
- Soak the rice or millet overnight (uncooked) to soften it.
- Strain off the water
- Pour rice into a blender, add water, cloves, tamarind and ginger and blend together
- Sift, add sugar and stir.

== Uses ==
It's suitable for all occasions and time.
