= University Star =

Student newspaper of Texas State University

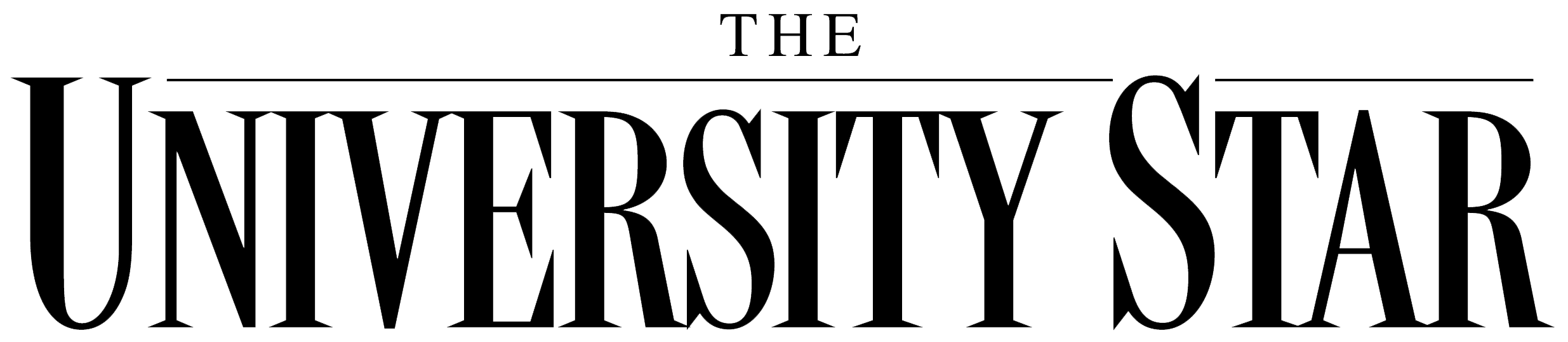

- Type: Student newspaper
- Format: Broadsheet
- Editor-in-chief: Carrington Tatum
- Managing editor: Katie Burrell
- News editor: Sawyer Click
- Founded: February 1911; 115 years ago
- Headquarters: San Marcos, Texas
- Country: United States
- Price: $7.65 non profit, $8.15 local, $11.15 agency
- Website: star.txstate.edu

The University Star, also called The Star, is a student-run newspaper for Texas State University. The Star provides news and information on issues that affect the Texas State community as well as San Marcos news.

== History ==
=== 20th century ===
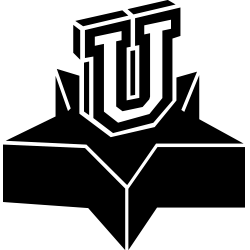
The secondary logo of the University Star

The first issue was published in February 1911, started by then student Fred W. Adams, son of John Anderson Adams, the founder of Adams Extract and Spice Company. Fred W. Adams persuaded the Southwest Texas Normal School administration to let him publish the newspaper, promising to pay for it himself if advertising could not sustain the cost.

The Star's notable alumni include former U.S. President Lyndon B. Johnson, who served as the newspaper's editor during the summers of 1928 and 1929, and expressed his ideas in his writings, which were heavily focused on politics.

=== 21st century ===
During the 2010-11 academic year, the University Star celebrated its 100th anniversary. At the end of April 2010, the newspaper held a reunion, bringing together both Star staff and alumni from across the country.

Also in 2010, the San Marcos City Council declared April 26 through May 1 as University Star Week in San Marcos.

== Distribution ==
The Star has a weekly distribution of 3,500 in the fall and spring semesters. It is produced on Tuesdays and distributed throughout the San Marcos and Round Rock campuses and San Marcos community. Content is produced twice during the summer, and has a distribution of 3,500 copies. The Star publishes special issues that complement its regular content throughout the year.

== Content ==
The Star covers local issues, controversies and events pertaining to the university, San Marcos, Hays County, and higher education. The newspaper is split into four sections: News, Life and Arts, Opinions and Sports.

In November 2017, the paper apologized for running a controversial student op-ed, titled "Your DNA is an Abomination."

== Awards ==
- The University Star has won several Texas Intercollegiate Press Association (TIPA) awards, College Media Association Pinnacles, Associated Collegiate Press Pacemakers, and Society of Professional Journalists Mark of Excellence Awards.
- Faculty adviser Laura Jett Krantz (2017-present) won the 2026 TIPA Adviser of the Year award.
- Faculty adviser Bob Bajackson (1999–2017) won the 2010 TIPA Adviser of the Year award

To date, three contributors to The University Star have been recognized by Hearst Journalism:

- David Rauf — 6th place (2006–07) In-Depth writing for "ASG executive officers defend 'conflict of interest' position" in The University Star
- Colter Ray — 12th place (2008–09) Photography — News & Sports, in the University Star
- Allen Reed — 17th place (2009–10) Feature writing for "A gift to Science in Death" in the Houston Chronicle during his internship at the Houston daily newspaper
