= Lundgren and Maurer =

Lundgren & Maurer was an Austin, Texas architecture firm active from 1950 until 1973. The firm was composed of principals Leonard J. Lundgren and Edward J. Maurer.

In 1954 the firm won an American Institute of Architects (AIA) merit award for the Pi Kappa Alpha Fraternity House in Austin, Texas.

Job files, photographs, and personal papers of Lundgren and Maurer are included in the architectural archives of the Austin History Center. Materials in the collection cover Lundgren and Maurer's work from the period 1961 through 1985.

== Notable buildings ==
- Pi Kappa Alpha Fraternity House, Austin, TX, 1954
- Adams Extract Headquarters and Plant (Demolished), Austin, TX, 1955
- Texas State Memorial, Vicksburg National Military Park, Vicksburg, MS, 1963
- Congregation Beth Israel Sanctuary Building, Austin, TX, 1967
- Holiday Inn Motor Hotel (Longbeach), Los Angeles, CA, 1967
- Holiday Inn Motor Hotel (Brentwood), Los Angeles, CA, 1969
- Holiday Inn Austin Town Lake, Austin, TX, 1967

== Residences ==
- Rubinett House, 3004 Belmont Cir., Austin, TX 1955
- Zidell House, 2015 W Lake Dr., Taylor, TX, 1953
- Sam Miller House, 6405 Shoal Creek Blvd., Austin, TX, 1955
- G.B. Guild House, 5817 Westslope Dr., Austin, TX, 1961
