= Frederick Bird Smith Cocke Jr. =

American politician

Texas State Representative from District 98 (Blanco, Comal, Gillespie, and Hays Counties)
- In office January 10, 1899 – January 8, 1901

Personal details
- Born: November 17, 1839
- Died: September 7, 1912 (aged 72)
- Resting place: Hays County, Texas
- Party: Democratic
- Spouse: Mary A. Eliza Carpenter
- Children: Birdie
- Occupation: Attorney

Frederick Bird Smith Cocke Jr. (November 17, 1839 – September 7, 1912) was the child of F.B.S. Cocke Sr. and Eliza M. Rogers. During the American Civil War, he served as the Captain of Cocke's Company, a unit raised in Caldwell County, Texas by John Salmon "Rip" Ford and later assigned to Benavides Cavalry Regiment. His unit saw service along the Rio Grande border and participated in the last battle of the Civil War, the Battle of Palmito Ranch. After the war, Cocke became active in the Democratic Party. He worked as a County and District Attorney in Bexar County. He was the lead attorney in the prosecution of Ben Thompson for the murder of Jack Harris. He was elected to the 26th Texas Legislature and in 1899 sponsored the bill establishing Southwest Texas State Normal School in San Marcos, now Texas State University. He died in 1912 and was buried in the Cocke family cemetery in Hays County, Texas.
