= Texas State University =

Public university in San Marcos, Texas, US

- Former name: List: Southwest Texas State Normal School (1899–1918) Southwest Texas State Normal College (1918–1923) Southwest Texas State Teachers College (1923–1959) Southwest Texas State College (1959–1969) Southwest Texas State University (1969–2003) Texas State University–San Marcos (2003–2013)
- Motto: Auctoritas Gravitas Humanitas Veritas (Latin)
- Motto in English: "Prestige, Seriousness, Humanity, Truth"
- Type: Public research university
- Established: May 10, 1899; 127 years ago
- Parent institution: Texas State University System
- Academic affiliations: CUMU; CONAHEC; Space grant
- Endowment: $1.6 billion ($463 million (FY 2025) + TXST’s TUF Share: $1.14 billion)
- Budget: $1.01 billion (FY2026)
- President: Kelly Damphousse
- Provost: Pranesh Aswath
- Students: 47,513 (fall 2026)
- Undergraduates: 41,285 (fall 2026)
- Postgraduates: 6,228 (fall 2026)
- Location: San Marcos, Texas, United States; 29°53′20″N 97°56′20″W
- Campus: 517 acres (209 ha); Small city
- Other campuses: Round Rock, Texas; Querétaro, Mexico
- Newspaper: University Star
- Colors: Maroon and gold
- Nickname: Bobcats
- Sporting affiliations: NCAA Division I FBS – Pac-12 Conference
- Mascot: Boko the Bobcat
- Website: txst.edu

Texas State University (TXST) is a public research university with its main campus in San Marcos, Texas, United States, with additional campuses in Round Rock, Texas, and Querétaro, Mexico. Established in 1899, the university has grown to be the seventh-largest university in Texas. Texas State University reached a record enrollment of 47,513 students for the fall 2026 semester, continuing a trend of enrollment growth over several years.

Texas State University offers over 200 bachelor's, master's, and doctoral degree programs from its nine colleges. TXST educates students at campuses in San Marcos, Round Rock, and Querétaro, Mexico, and through TXST Online, as well as offering degrees through TXST Local co-enrollment programs across the state. The university is accredited by the Southern Association of Colleges and Schools (SACS) and designated as a Hispanic-Serving Institution (HSI) by the U.S. Department of Education. Texas State is classified among "R2: Doctoral Universities – High research activity" and an Emerging Research University (ERU) by the State of Texas. It spent more than $160 million in research expenditures during fiscal year 2024.

Texas State's main campus consists of 250 buildings on 517 acres (2.09 km^{2}) of hilly land along the San Marcos River. It also has a 101 acres (0.41 km^{2}) satellite campus at its Round Rock Campus (RRC) in the greater north Austin area. The university operates the 70 acres (0.28 km^{2}) Science, Technology and Advanced Research (STAR) Park, a technology commercialization and applied research facility. Texas State has 4,522 acres (18.30 km^{2}) additional acres of recreational, instructional, farm, and ranch land. TXST’s Freeman Center is a 3,500-acre ranch that serves as a field laboratory for research, agriculture and land management projects and houses the Forensic Anthropology Center. The Forensic Anthropology Center at Texas State is the largest forensics research facility in the world.

Texas State University's intercollegiate sports teams, the Bobcats, compete in National Collegiate Athletic Association (NCAA) Division I as members of the Pac-12 conference.

== History ==
Texas State University was first proposed in a March 3, 1899 bill by state representative Fred Cocke with the name of Southwest Texas State Normal School. Cocke represented the citizens of Hays and surrounding counties where the school was to be located. While there was opposition to the bill, with the support of state senator J.B. Dibrell, it was finally passed and signed into law on May 10, 1899, by Governor Joseph D. Sayers. The school's purpose was to train the future teachers of Texas. Any students earning a diploma and teaching certificate from the school would be authorized to teach in the state's public schools. In October 1899, the San Marcos City Council voted to donate 11 acres (45,000 m^{2}) of land at what was known as Chautauqua Hill for the school to be built on. It was not until 1901 that the Texas legislature accepted this donation and approved $25,000 to be used for construction of buildings on the site. The building now known as Old Main was completed and the school opened its doors to its first enrollment of 303 students in September 1903.

The San Marcos School Board began a partnership with the school in 1912 in order to allow Southwest Texas State Normal School students to instruct local school children as part of their training to become teachers. The San Marcos East End Ward School, comprising the first eight grades of the school district, was moved onto the Southwest Texas State campus in 1917. In 1935, a formal contract between Southwest Texas State Teachers College, as it was known then, and the San Marcos school district for the "Public Schools [to become] the laboratory school for said Teachers College." The school would be under the control and supervision of the city of San Marcos but Southwest Texas State was responsible for providing and maintaining buildings and equipment for the city's elementary and junior high schools.

The college enrolled its first African-American students in 1963, following a federal lawsuit brought by Dana Smith, who became one of the first five African Americans at the institution when a district court judge ruled that they could not be denied admission based on race.

The school's most famous alumnus, United States president Lyndon B. Johnson, returned to his alma mater on November 8 of 1965 in order to sign the Higher Education Act of 1965, a part of the Great Society programs. The president gave a speech in the old Strahan Gymnasium on the school's campus (now the Music Building), before signing the bill. He recounted his own difficulties affording to go to college: having to shower and shave in the school's gymnasium, living above a faculty member's garage, and working multiple jobs.

Ten students were suspended from Texas State for protesting the Vietnam War on November 13 in 1969. They became known as the "San Marcos 10." They appealed their expulsion through the normal school channels, and then they filed a lawsuit against the president of the university, the dean of students and the Texas State University system Board of Regents. They were reinstated via an injunction and attended classes while their case moved through the courts. When their appeals were rejected, they submitted their case to the U.S. Supreme Court, but only Justice William Douglas voted to hear their argument so the decisions of the lower courts stood. The San Marcos 10 subsequently lost all of the credits for the semesters they completed while their lawsuit moved through the court system.

=== Expansion ===
The campus has grown substantially from its original 11 acres in 1899. During the first 40 years of the school's history, the campus was expanded to accommodate 18 buildings around the original Main Building. These buildings included academic buildings, a library, buildings to house the San Marcos school students, dormitories, a dining hall, and men's and women's gymnasiums. In 1926, 90 acres of land adjacent to the San Marcos River was purchased by A. B. Rogers to build a hotel, glass-bottom boat rides and other water-based attractions to become the Aquarena Springs theme park. The university bought the property in 1994 intending to use the land as a research and education center. In 2002, this piece of land became known as the International Institute for Sustainable Water Resources and offered educational tours including a wetlands boardwalk and continued to offer glass-bottom boat rides.

In 1996, the school began offering courses in Round Rock, Texas, on the campus of Westwood High School. It originally offered night classes that allowed students to earn graduate degrees in business administration and education. As enrollment in these programs increased and with a gift of 101 acres (0.41 km^{2}), the Texas State University Round Rock Campus was constructed and opened in 2005.

=== Name changes ===
The school's name has changed several times over the course of its history. The first change occurred in 1918 when Southwest Texas State Normal School became Southwest Texas State Normal College, after the Board of Regents, two years earlier, had authorized the school to begin granting degrees as a senior college. In 1921, a statewide effort was launched to improve academic standards in Texas normal schools to meet more closely the requirements of the University of Texas. These improvements prompted a second name change in 1923, when the Texas Legislature renamed the school Southwest Texas State Teachers College. Another change occurred in 1959, with the school becoming Southwest Texas State College. Ten years later, the legislature renamed the school Southwest Texas State University.

In 2003, members of the school's Associated Student Government (ASG), approached state senator Jeff Wentworth asking that the school be renamed Texas State University at San Marcos. The ASG had unanimously approved a resolution supporting the change, arguing that the current name reflected a regionalism that was not aligned with the university's effort to reach top-tier status. The ASG further said that donations from the school's alumni would pay for implementing the name change so that state tax dollars would not be required. Some students and alumni protested the change, pointing out that no vote had been taken on the matter. A bill, sponsored by Senator Wentworth, was passed and on September 1, 2003, the school became known as Texas State University–San Marcos. The city was originally included in the name to differentiate it from other schools in the Texas State University System, which were, at the time, expected to change their names to Texas State University (e.g. Texas State University–Beaumont). Those changes did not occur, however, and after Texas State continued to expand its campus in Round Rock, the university requested that the name of the city be removed from the school's name. In 2013, under the McDaniel-Sibley ASG Administration, Associated Student Government senator Quentin De La Garza continued the efforts to have the name changed. A bill to accomplish that change was passed by the Eighty-third Texas Legislature and signed by the governor. The name was officially changed on September 1, 2013, for the sixth time in the school's history.

== Campus ==
Texas State University comprises over 8 million gross square feet in facilities and its campuses are located on over 500 acres with an additional 4,000 acres of agriculture, research, and recreational areas. The Texas State University main campus is located in San Marcos, Texas, midway between Austin and San Antonio along Interstate 35. It spans 517 acres (2.09 km^{2}), including the original land donated by the city of San Marcos consisting of Chautauqua Hill on which Old Main still sits. The university also operates a 101 acres (0.41 km^{2}) Round Rock Campus and a 70 acres (0.28 km^{2}) Science, Technology, and Advanced Research (STAR) Park; other parts of the Texas State property including farm and ranch land, residential, recreational areas and commercial incubators cover more than 4,522 acres (18.30 km^{2}) of additional land.

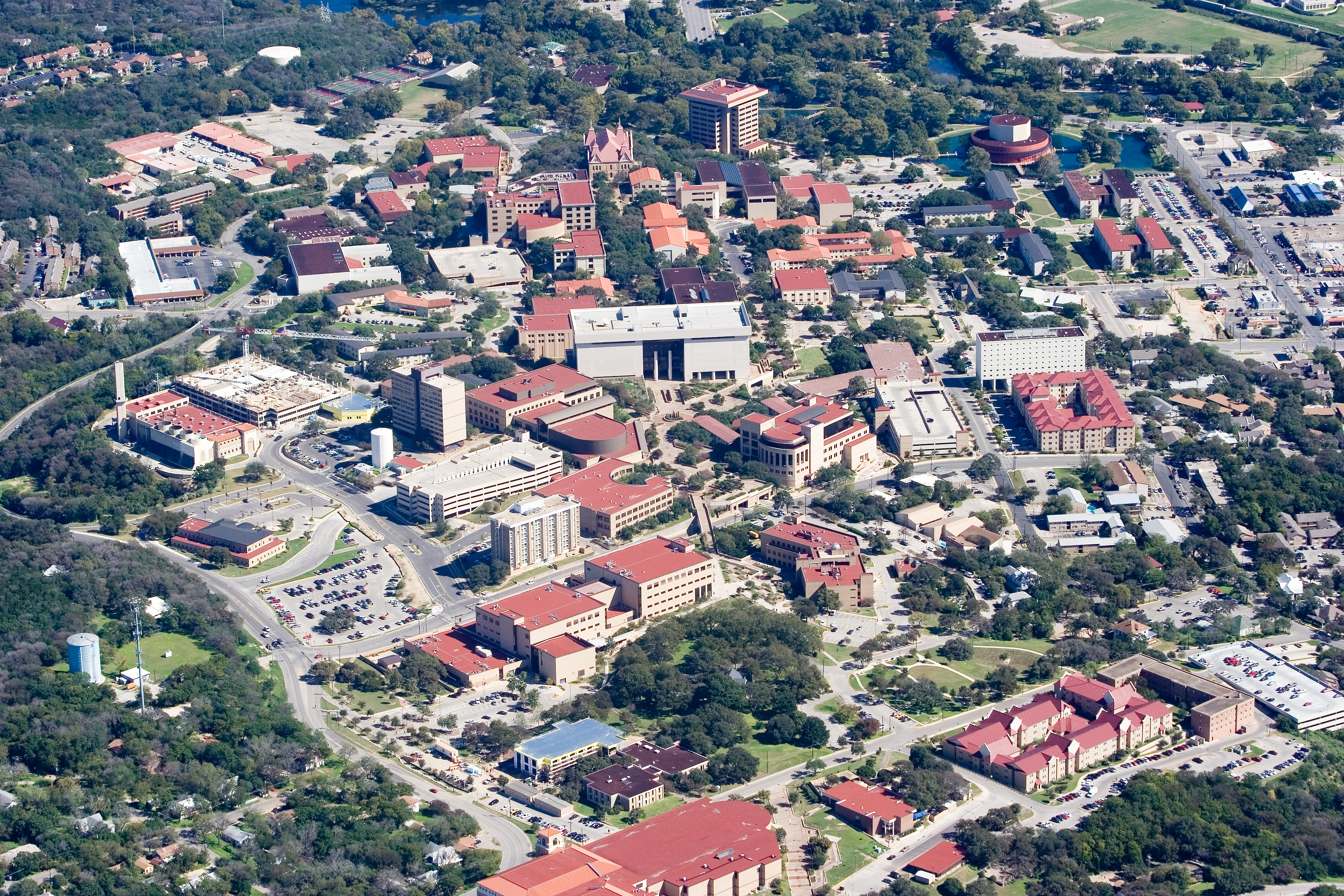
Aerial view of TXST campus in 2009

The Quad is the heart of campus because it is surrounded by a majority of the academic buildings and is near the bus loop where most of the university bus routes stop on campus. Since many students pass through the quad, it is the primary gathering place for student organizations, which often set up booths and tables promoting fundraisers and events. The west end of the Quad has a 17-foot high aluminum sculpture of two horses, called The Fighting Stallions. This area was designated as the university's free speech zone and was subject to one of the first court challenges to the creation of such zones after the suspension of ten students protesting the Vietnam War. The east end of the Quad rises to the top of the highest hill on campus where the university's oldest building, Old Main, sits.

The main campus in San Marcos served as the location of the fictional school TMU (Texas Methodist University) in the NBC TV series Friday Night Lights. San Marcos has also served as a location for films including The Getaway, Boyhood, Everybody Wants Some, Piranha, A Small Town in Texas, Courage Under Fire, and The New Guy, among others.

=== Old Main ===
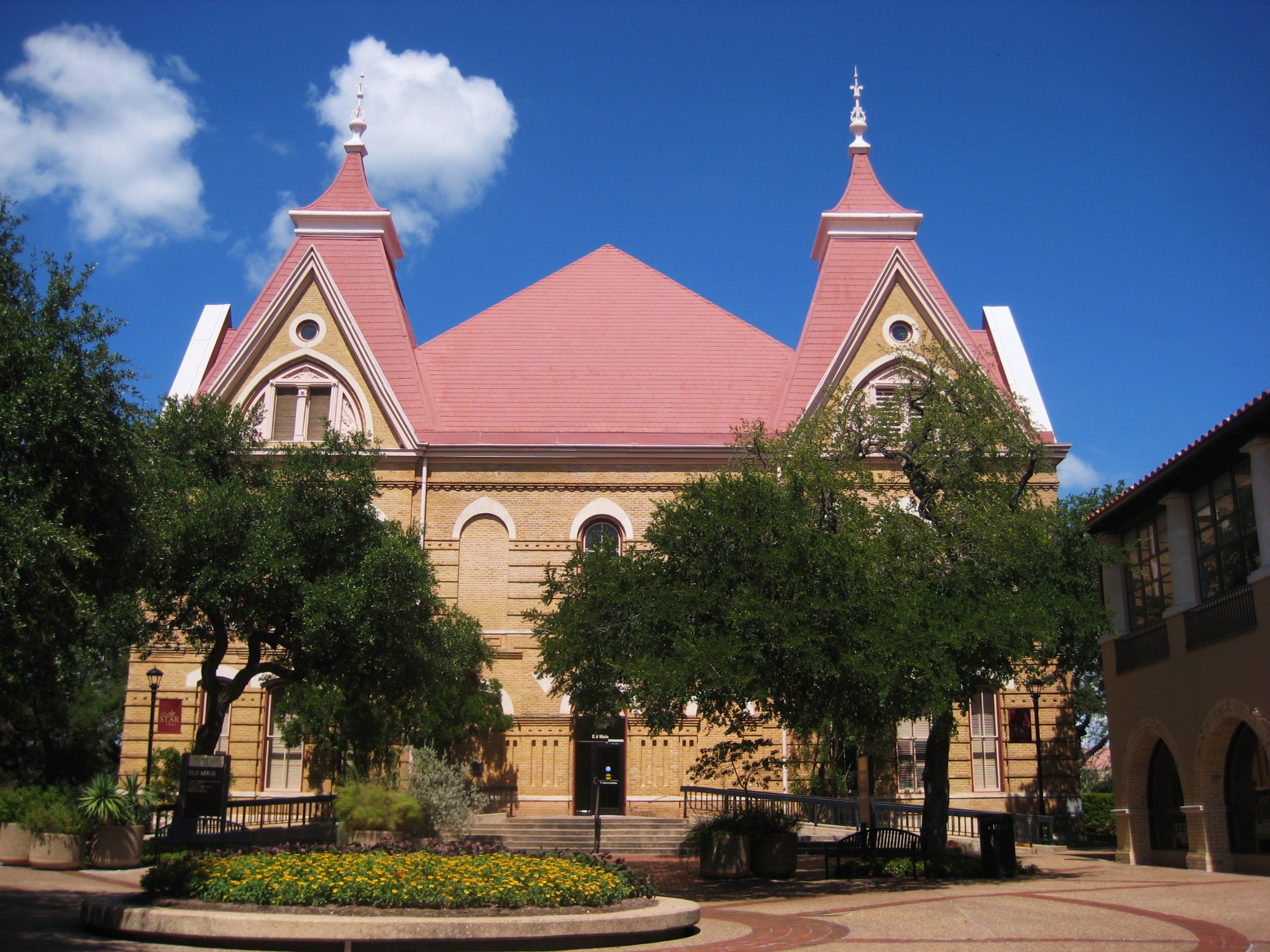
Old Main

Built in 1903 and originally called the Main Building, Old Main was the first building on the campus. The design was closely patterned on the Old Main Building of 1889 at Sam Houston State University, designed by Alfred Muller of Galveston. Fourteen years later, E. Northcraft, the engineer for the building at Sam Houston, oversaw construction of the Texas State University Main Building, a Victorian Gothic structure. It was added to the National Register of Historic Places in 1983. In more than a century of use, and through many renovations, the building has served varied purposes, from being the university's administration building to an auditorium and chapel to now housing the offices for the School of Journalism and Mass Communication as well as the offices of the College of Fine Arts and Communication.

=== Alkek Library ===
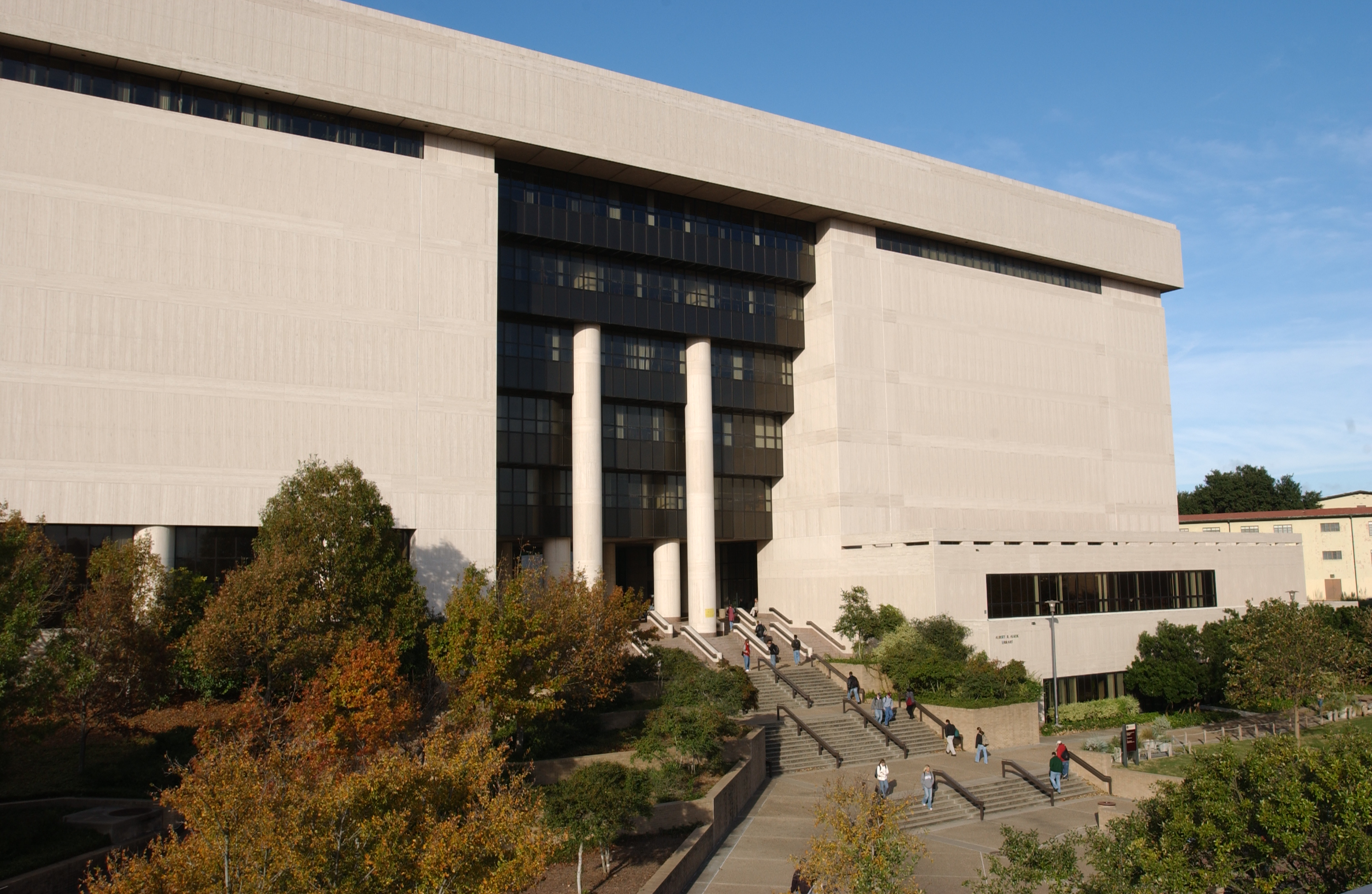
Alkek Library

The university's library was named in 1991 for an alumnus, Albert B. Alkek, who became an oilman, rancher, and philanthropist. The Albert B. Alkek Library serves as the main academic library supporting the university community. It is a "select depository" for United States and Texas government documents, receiving a large number of government publications from the state and 60% of all federal publications.

=== The Wittliff Collections ===
Located on the seventh floor of Alkek Library, The Wittliff Collections includes the Southwestern Writers Collection, the Southwestern & Mexican Photography Collection, the Lonesome Dove Collection, and the Texas Music Collection.

The Wittliff collects, preserves, and presents the cultural heritage of Texas, the Southwest, and Mexico through works of the region’s storytellers. It is home to the largest US repository of contemporary Mexican photography, as well as home of the King of the Hill archives and major collections of works by Cormac McCarthy, Sam Shepard, and Sandra Cisneros, and the Lonesome Dove miniseries collection. Its collections also include artifacts from musicians with strong connections to Texas such as Willie Nelson, Stevie Ray Vaughan, and Selena.

=== Sewell Park ===
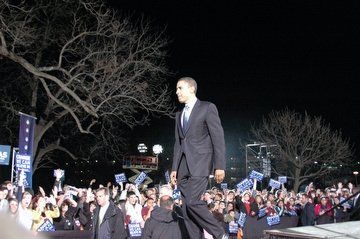
Presidential candidate Barack Obama on a campaign stop at Sewell Park in 2008

Sewell Park, located on the Texas State University campus on the banks of the San Marcos River in San Marcos, Texas, borders City Park, the San Marcos Mill Tract and Strahan Coliseum. It was opened in 1917 by Southwest Texas State Normal School as Riverside Park. The land was owned by the U.S. Bureau of Fisheries and leased to the school. It was originally used by students to learn how to swim and for general recreation. The river banks were built up from the river bottom by university workers. In 1949, the park was renamed Sewell Park in honor of S. M. Sewell, a mathematics professor who helped form the park.

After commencement ceremonies in Strahan Arena at the University Event Center conclude each year, the new graduates proceed to nearby Sewell Park where they jump into the river wearing their regalia.

=== Round Rock Campus ===
==== Establishment and Early Development ====
Texas State University began offering courses in Round Rock in 1996 through the Round Rock Higher Education Center (RRHEC), which was originally located on the campus of Westwood High School. The center expanded its academic offerings over the following years. By 1998, RRHEC offered 6 undergraduate degree programs and 19 graduate degree programs. During this time, only upper-level undergraduate courses were offered.

In 2004, construction began on the Avery Building, the first permanent facility at the future Round Rock Campus. The project marked the university's transition from a satellite instructional site to a dedicated campus. In 1998, Dr. Edna Rehbein was appointed the first director of the RRHEC and led the institution through its transformation into a comprehensive university campus.

==== Campus Expansion ====
The Avery Building opened in 2005, formally establishing the Texas State University Round Rock Campus. In 2010, the Nursing Building opened as the home of the St. David's School of Nursing, which welcomed its first cohort of students in August.

The campus continued to expand in the early 2020s. In 2023, Dr. Julie Lessiter was appointed the first vice president for the Round Rock Campus, reporting directly to the president of Texas State University. In 2024, the campus expanded its undergraduate degree programs, establishing its first ever cohort of first-year students pursuing 4-year degrees, fully based in Round Rock.

==== Freshman Enrollment and Recent Growth ====
In 2024, the Round Rock Campus enrolled its first freshman class, a shift from its traditional upper-division and graduate-level focus. As of fall 2025, enrollment at the Round Rock Campus reached 2,918.

==== Academics ====
As of 2025, the campus offers 20 undergraduate degree programs and 10 graduate degree programs, including: Applied Arts & Sciences, Communication Disorders, Computer Science, Criminal Justice, Elementary Education, Finance, Health Information Management, Health Sciences, Information Systems, Integrated Studies, Management, Marketing, Mass Communication, Nursing, Physical Therapy, Psychology, Public Relations, Radiation Therapy, Respiratory Care, and Social Work.

==== Facilities ====
===== Avery Building =====
Opened in 20025, the Avery Building was the first permanent academic facility at the Round Rock Campus.

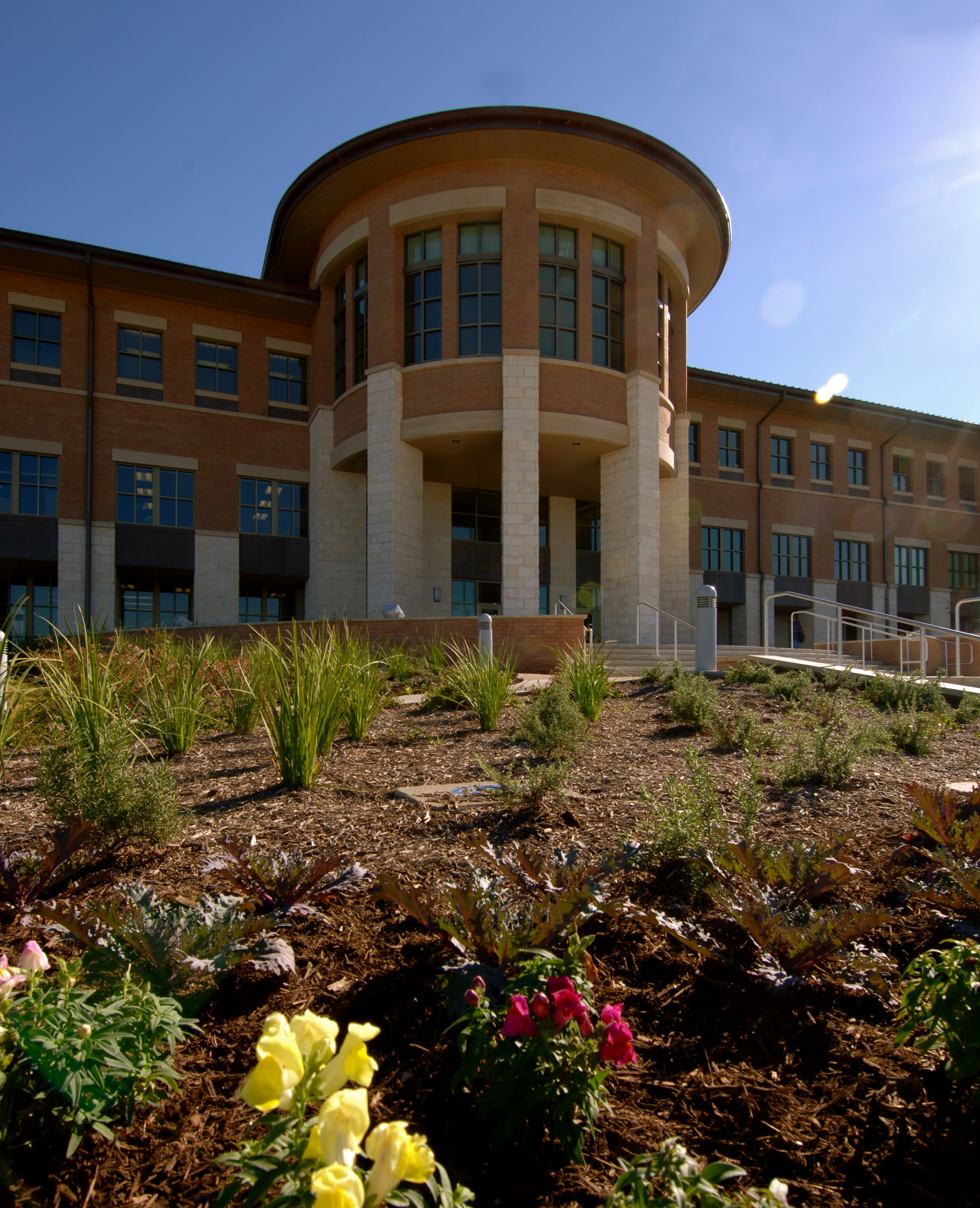
Avery Building at the Round Rock Campus

===== Nursing Building =====
The Nursing Building opened in 2010 and housed the St. David's School of Nursing during the early years of the campus's expansion into health professions education.

===== Willow Hall =====
Willow Hall opened in 2018 and became the primary home of health professions programs like physical therapy, communication disorders, and respiratory care.

===== Campus Services Building =====
Completed in 2021, the Campus Services Building houses Facility Services, Parking Services, and the University Police Department.

===== Esperanza Hall =====
Construction on Esperanza Hall began in 2024. The facility is intended to provide expanded student services, academic support resources, and campus engagement spaces.

==== Administration ====
Edna Rehbein served as the first director of the Round Rock Higher Education Center, beginning in 1998, and oversaw the institution's transition to a permanent campus. In 2023, Julie Lessiter became the first vice president for the Round Rock Campus.

== Academics ==
=== Student body ===
Student enrollment demographics as of 2026
Race and ethnicity	Total
Hispanic	38%
White	35%
Black	11%
International student	5%
Unknown	5%
Asian	3%
Two or more races	2%

As of the fall 2025 semester, Texas State University had a total enrollment of 44,596. Of the student body, 39,376 are undergraduate students with the remaining students being post-baccalaureate or graduate students. The university accepted 68% of freshmen applicants who applied to attend the fall 2023 semester. This includes the guaranteed acceptance of any Texas high school graduate with a grade point average that ranked them in the top 10% of their high school class. About 56% of undergraduate students earn their degree after six years. Hispanic students made up 30% of the student body in 2013, which increased to 32% in 2014, qualifying the university to be designated as a Hispanic-serving institution. Additionally, the student body consists of approximately 60% female students, 78% students who live off-campus, and only 10% students who are members of a fraternity or sorority.

=== Rankings ===
Academic rankings

National
- Forbes: 298
- U.S. News & World Report: 257 (tie)
- Washington Monthly: 223
- WSJ/College Pulse: 244

Global
- THE: 1,201-1,500
- U.S. News & World Report: 1,592 (tie)

In 2024, Texas State University earned its fourth consecutive gold designation in the Veteran Education Excellence Recognition Award by the Texas Veterans Commission's (TVC) Veterans Education Program. The university was also named a Fulbright Hispanic-Serving Institution Leader by the U.S. Department of State and was ranked among the best colleges in America by the Princeton Review, Wall Street Journal, and Forbes.

In the 2025 edition of the U.S. News & World Report rankings, Texas State was tied for 257th among national universities.

=== Colleges ===
Texas State University offers degrees in 104 bachelor programs, 94 master programs and 23 doctoral programs. The university has been accredited by the Southern Association of Colleges and Schools since 1925 and had its last review in 2021.

=== Research ===
In January 2012, Texas State University was designated an emerging research university by the Texas Higher Education Coordinating Board. To achieve this status a university must spend at least $14 million in its research endeavors and either offer at least 10 doctoral degrees or have at least 150 enrolled doctoral students. In 2016, the Carnegie Foundation for the Advancement of Teaching reclassified Texas State University as an R2 institution, the second-highest designation for research institutions in the country under Carnegie's respected classification system. The university's Run to R1 initiative is focused on achieving R1 status by 2027.

Texas State is home to more than 30 research centers and institutes, including the Center for Analytics and Data Science, The Meadows Center for Water and the Environment, The Texas School Safety Center, the Center for the Study of the Southwest, the Center for Texas Music History, the Translational Health Research Center (THRC) and more.

One of Texas State's facilities includes its Science, Technology, and Advanced Research (STAR) Park that was approved by the Texas State University System Regents in May 2011 with a focus on environmental sustainability and biotechnology. The facility is funded through multiple grants including $1.8 million from the U.S. Economic Development Administration and $4.2 million from the Texas Emerging Technology Fund. The facility serves as a location for university faculty to perform advanced research and to commercialize that research into startup companies.

The Advanced Law Enforcement Rapid Response Training (ALERRT) Center is a research-based active shooter response training center created as a partnership between Texas State, the San Marcos Police Department, and the Hays County Sheriff's Office. In 2013, the FBI declared the ALERRT Level 1 program as the national standard for active shooter and violent threat response training.

The Forensic Anthropology Center at Texas State is one of seven extant human decomposition research facilities (body farms) in the United States. It is the largest such forensics research facility in the world.

In August 2012, Texas State's River Systems Institute was renamed the Meadows Center for Water and the Environment. This name change was the result of donations totaling $5 million from the Meadows Foundation in Dallas, Texas. The center's mission is to inspire “research, innovation, and leadership that ensures clean, abundant water for the environment and all humanity,” and its studies and initiatives focus on water management, education, conservation, and sustainability.

== Extracurricular activities ==
=== Residential life ===
Approximately 20% of Texas State students live in on-campus or in university-owned housing including about 88% of freshman students. Beginning in fall 2024, there were approximately 9,042 students in a variety of housing options including traditional dorms and apartment-style housing offered by the university.

=== Student organizations ===
Texas State University has more than 300 student organizations registered with its Student Involvement department.

==== Student Government ====
The school's student government is an organization of both undergraduate and graduate students who represent student's interests with the university administration. Student government has dealt with issues including concealed carry on campus and the university's anti-tobacco policy. Student Government also administers a scholarship fund that any Texas State student can apply to earn.

==== Honors Societies ====
A number of honors societies exists on campus including Golden Key and the Alpha Chi honor society. Texas State was a charter member of Alpha Chi when it was created as the Scholarship Societies of the South in 1927. Texas State also has an active chapter of Alpha Phi Omega, National Service Fraternity.

In 2025, TXST inducted its first class into the TXST chapter of Phi Beta Kappa. The Phi Beta Kappa Society, founded in 1776, is the nation’s oldest academic honor society. It has chapters at more than 290 colleges and universities in the United States, nearly 50 alumni associations and more than half a million members worldwide.

==== Greek Life ====
These organizations include Greek organizations, academic groups, honors societies, service groups, sports clubs, and common interest groups. After the death of a Phi Kappa Psi pledge in November 2017, Texas State University halted all Greek life activities. They resumed in March 2018.

==== The Big Event ====
The Big Event, formerly known as Bobcat Build, is a yearly community service event that began in 2001 and is the largest such event run by students at the university. The event allows student organizations and individual Texas State students to sign up to perform service projects throughout the San Marcos community. The event has received recognition from state and national politicians including former state representative Patrick Rose and U.S. representative Lloyd Doggett.

==== Music and Performance Groups ====
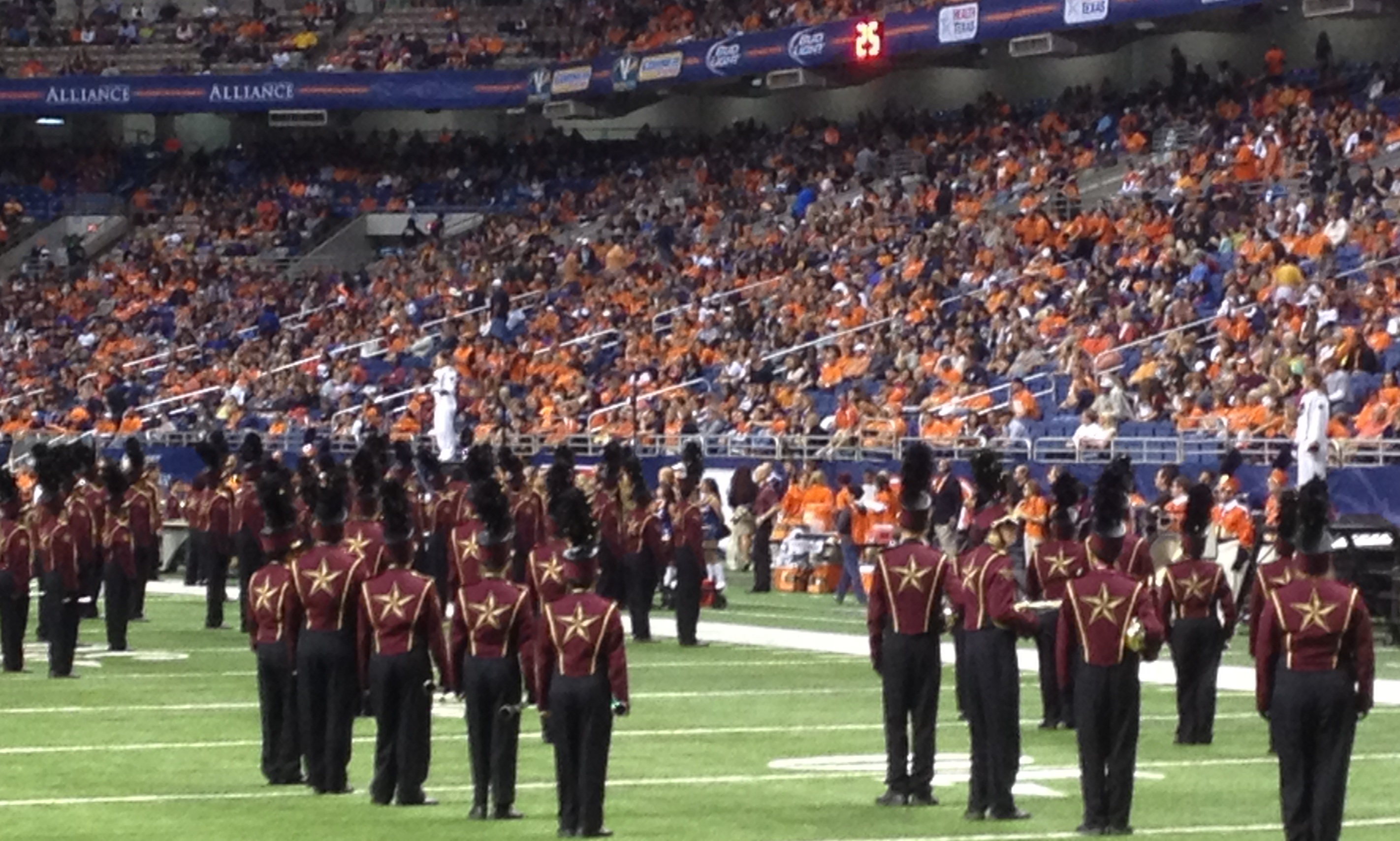
The Bobcat Marching Band performs during halftime at UTSA

===== Bobcat Marching Band =====
The Bobcat Marching Band is the collegiate marching band of Texas State University. Nicknamed "The Pride of the Hill Country," the band began in 1919 as a casual association of student musicians on campus. It later evolved into a formal organization that performs at Texas State football games, NFL football games, professional soccer games, two presidential inaugurations, and a number of Hollywood movies and marching band-oriented videos.

===== Mariachi Nueva Generación =====
Mariachi Nueva Generación became a class at TXST in 1997. The group is dedicated to the study and performance of all genres associated with mariachi. Since its creation, Texas State Mariachi Nueva Generación has established itself as one of the leading university mariachis in Texas, and it won first-place awards at Mariachi Vargas Extravaganza in 2024 and 2025.

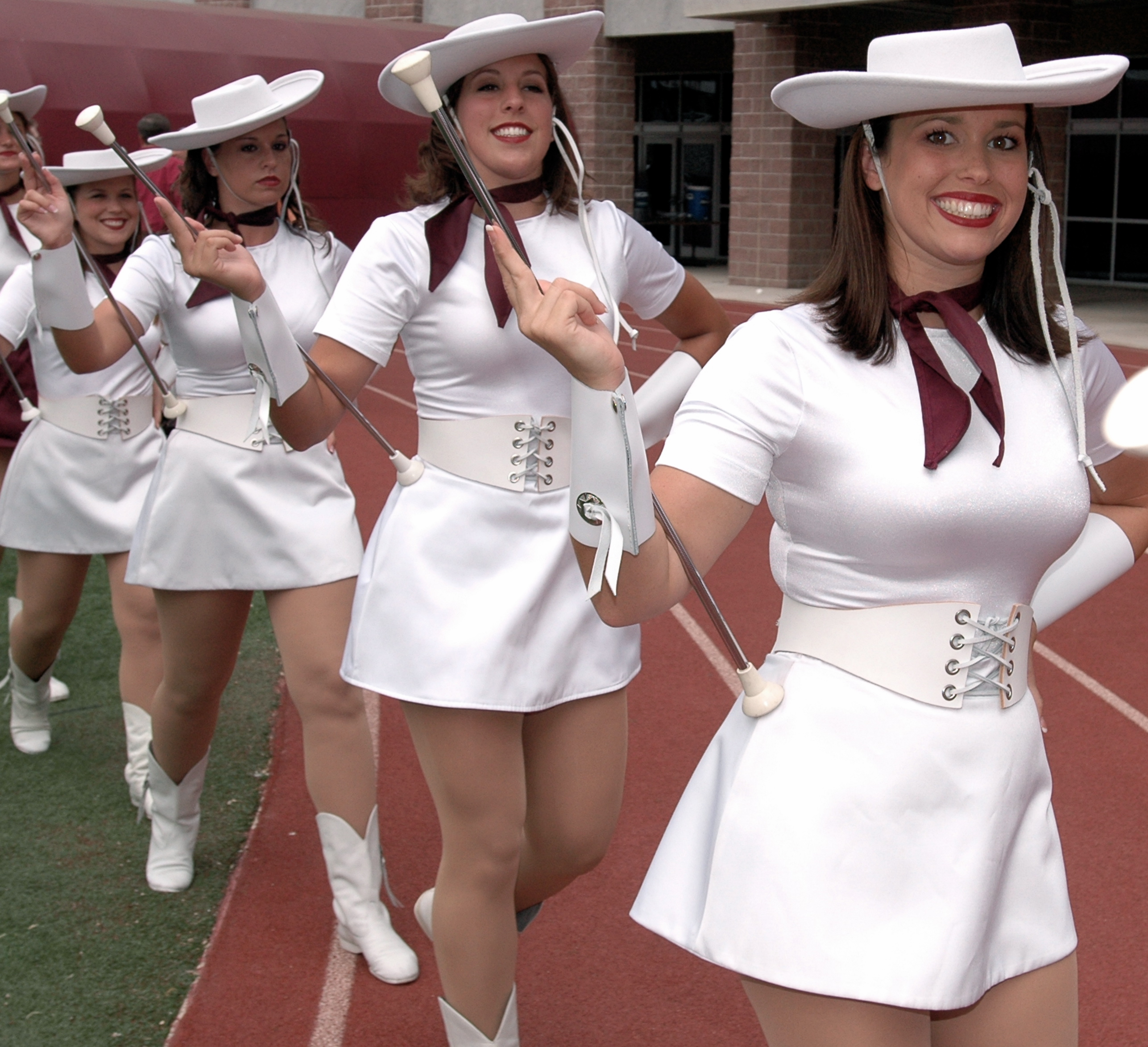
Texas State Strutters

===== Texas State Strutters =====
The Texas State Strutters are a precision dance team formed in 1960, the first of its kind at a four-year institution in the United States. The group performs to a variety of music including high kick, jazz, funk, and hip hop. The Strutters have performed nationally and internationally in 26 countries spanning 4 continents. Performances include two presidential inaugural parades, two Macy's Thanksgiving Day Parades, several NBA and NFL halftime shows, and America's Got Talent. They are the first university dance team to be invited to the People's Republic of China.

=== Media ===
The oldest form of student media at Texas State was a yearbook originally called the Pedagogue and later renamed the Pedagog. It was first published in 1904 and served to record each year's events through photographs and articles. It was temporarily discontinued in 1975 due to a combination of the cost to publish the annual and a lack of student interest. It was published again in 1978 as part of the school's seventy-fifth anniversary. In 1984 it resumed regular publication. However, it was last published in 2000 after university committees recommended replacing the printed yearbook with a video disk containing the same contents. The annual has since been discontinued entirely.

The university's newspaper was first published in 1911 and called the Normal Star. Now called the University Star, it publishes coverage of the college's news, trends, opinions and sports. The newspaper is published on Tuesdays while classes are in session in the fall and spring semesters. The paper is published five times during the summer. The Star has a web site which contains videos, blogs and podcasts in addition to the articles that are published in the print version of the paper. The Star and its staff have received awards including merits from Hearst Journalism, the Texas Intercollegiate Press Association and the Society of Professional Journalists.

Located in the Trinity Building, Texas State's FM radio station, KTSW, broadcasts at 89.9 MHz and provides sports coverage of Texas State Athletics and independent music. The KTSW website provides live-streaming broadcasts, and the Texas State television channel employs KTSW broadcasts as background music. KTSW's morning show, Orange Juice and Biscuits, gained recognition in 2007 for being a finalist in Collegiate Broadcasters Inc.'s "Best Regularly Scheduled Program" award. In October 2008, as it was among Austin360.com's top ten-rated morning radio shows.

== Athletics ==
Texas State currently competes at the NCAA Division I level and are members of the Pac-12 Conference as of 2026.

=== Recent Championships ===
Texas State teams and athletes from multiple sports have won national and regional championships as well as medals in the Olympic Games.

In 2026, TXST men's and women's track & field swept the Sun Belt Conference Indoor Championships for the first time in program history. In January 2026, the football team won its third bowl game in a row with a 41-10 win over Rice in the Armed Forces Bowl. In November 2025, Texas State secured its first Sun Belt Conference Women’s Soccer Championship in a 1-0 victory over third-seeded ULM. In 2025, for the second consecutive season, and third in the last four, Texas State won the Sun Belt Conference's Vic Bubas Cup, which is presented annually to the league's top athletics department.

=== Mascot and logo ===
In 1920, Texas State adopted its first official mascot, the bobcat, at the urging of Oscar Strahan, who became the school's athletic director in 1919. Strahan suggested the bobcat because the cat is native to central Texas and is known for its ferocity. The bobcat did not get a name until 1964. At that time, Beth Greenlees won the Name the Bobcat contest with the name Boko the Bobcat. The athletic logo, or spirit mark, is referred to as the SuperCat logo. The current version of the logo was designed by a student in 2003. In August 2009, Texas State refined the logo with the addition of the Texas State lettering.

=== Rivalries ===
A thirteen-year rivalry with Nicholls State University ended with the 2011 football season. It began in 1998 when the annual football game between the two schools was at first cancelled due to severe flooding in San Marcos, where the game was to be played. The athletic directors and coaches later decided to postpone the game from October to November. To remember those affected by the floods, including some people who had died in it, a wooden oar was made with each school's colors and initials. The winning school would take possession of the oar for the next year and have the score inscribed on it. This rivalry became known as the Battle for the Paddle. The oar was last traded in 2010 when Nicholls State received it following 47–44 win over Texas State after four overtimes. Prior to the schools' meeting in 2011, Rob Bernardi, the athletic director for Nicholls State, said that they would not be bringing the oar to San Marcos and would leave it on display in the Nicholls State athletic offices. Due to Texas State changing conferences, Bernardi said it was unlikely that the schools will face each other in football again and that the rivalry was ending.

The rivalry with the University of Texas at San Antonio (UTSA) is dubbed the I-35 Showdown for the interstate highway that links San Marcos and San Antonio. A trophy consisting of an Interstate Highway 35 sign was originally given to the winner of the men's basketball game, but that tradition has been expanded to all sporting events between the two schools.

Texas State's only in-state Sun Belt conference rival was the University of Texas at Arlington (UT Arlington). The rivalry never ceased as both schools moved from the Southland Conference to the Western Athletic Conference then on to the Sun Belt Conference until 2022 when the Sun Belt stopped sponsoring non-football teams and UT Arlington returned to the Western Athletic Conference.

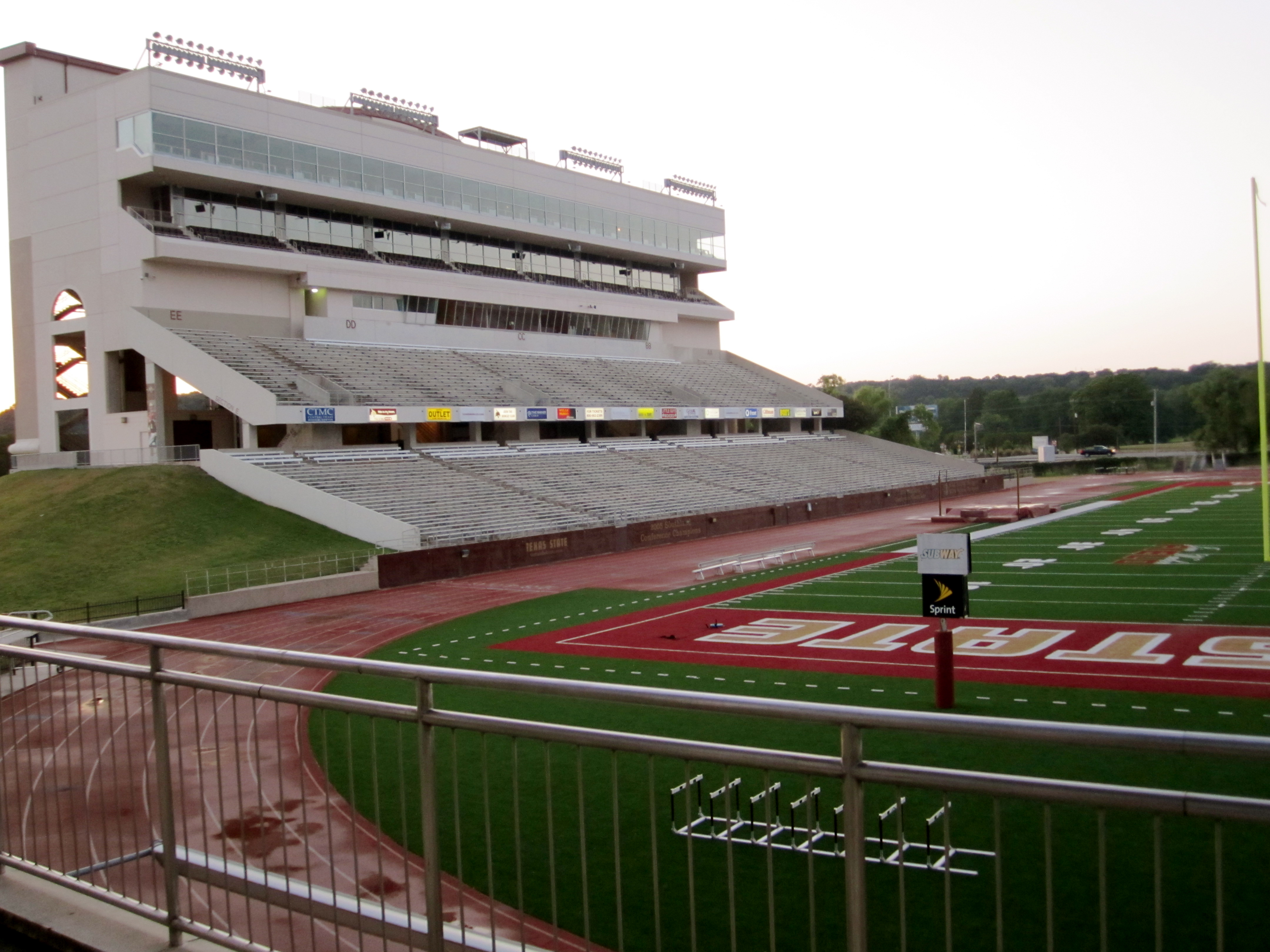
Fields West Side Complex at Bobcat Stadium completed in 2009

=== Transition to FBS ===
In the summer of 2007, university president Denise Trauth created the Athletic Strategic Planning Committee with the purpose of evaluating a move for the football team to go to the Football Bowl Subdivision (FBS). The committee released its final report in November 2007 which included a series of tasks that would need to be completed to make the move. The university called its efforts The Drive to FBS. Following the release of the committee's report, the university's Associated Student Government passed a bill for a student referendum to be held the following spring to obtain the student body's endorsement of an increase in fees to help pay for the move to the FBS. In February 2008, almost 80% of the students who voted in the referendum, approved a raise in the athletics fee by $10 over the next five years. Another set of milestones for the Drive involved improvements to Texas State's football stadium, Bobcat Stadium. Three phases of construction were completed to double the seating capacity of the stadium to 30,000, add luxury boxes, improvements to the press box, and replace the visitors' locker room.

== Alumni ==
Notable people

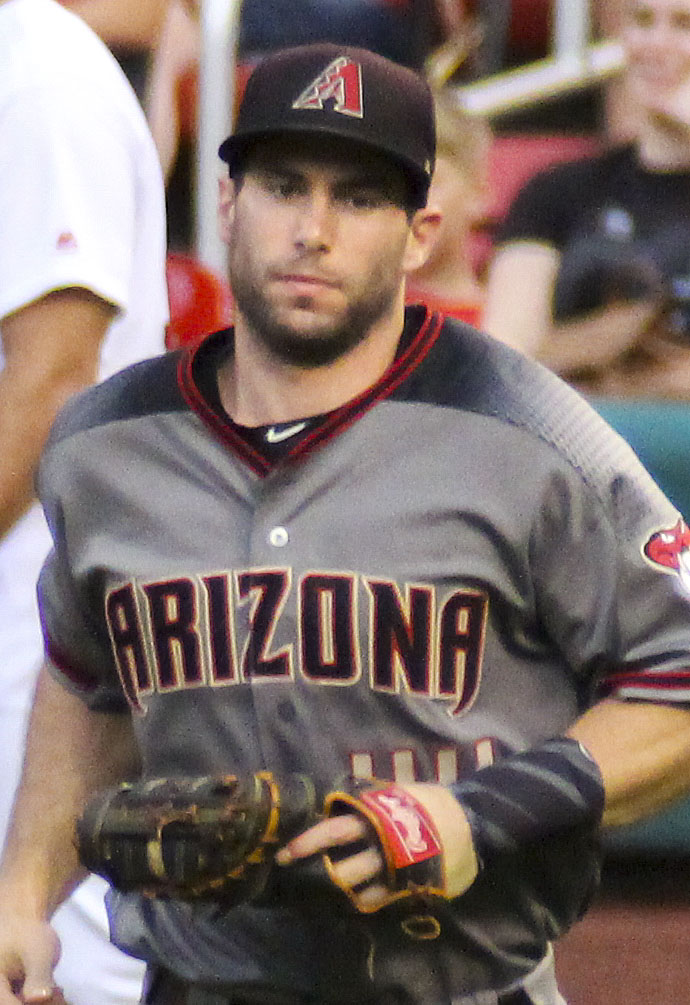
Paul Goldschmidt
7-time MLB All-Star

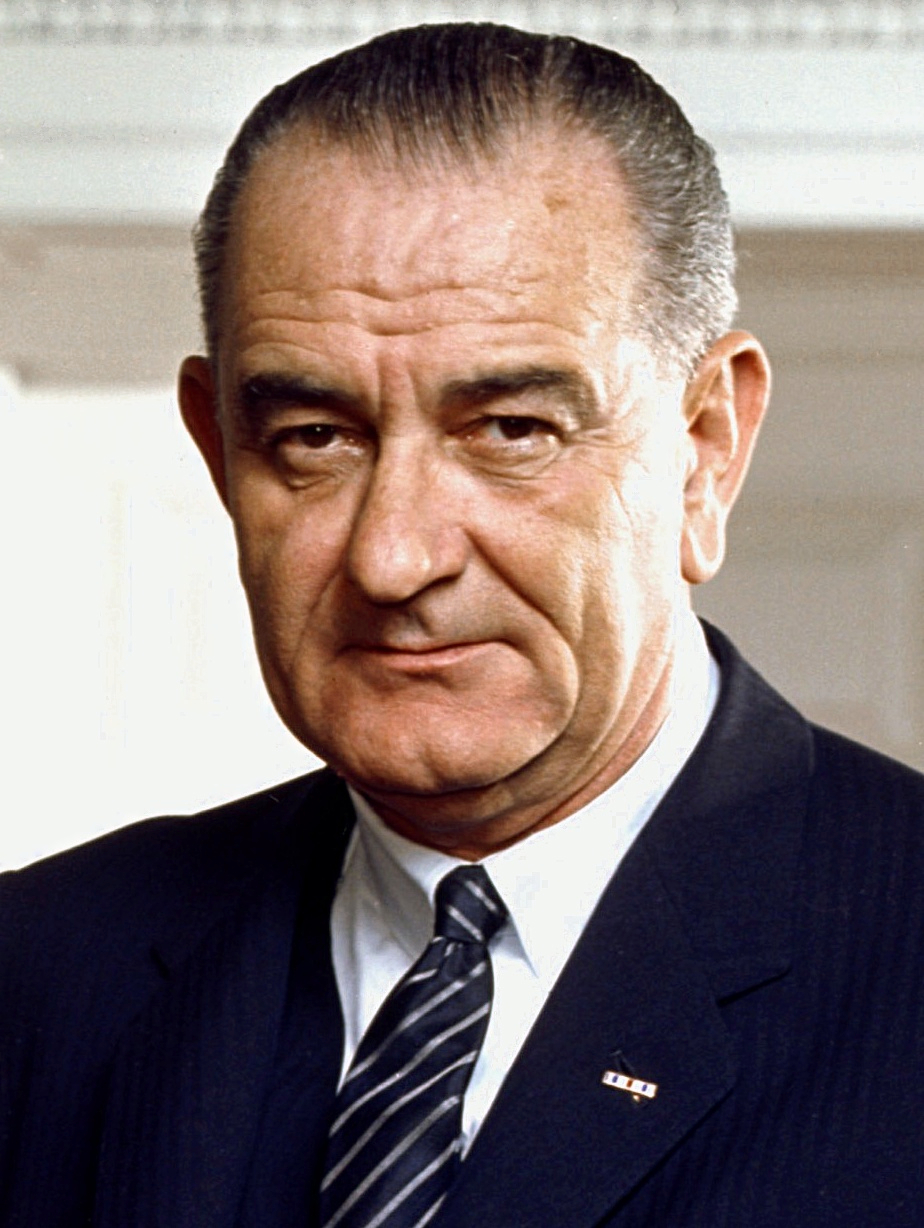
Lyndon B. Johnson
36th President of the United States

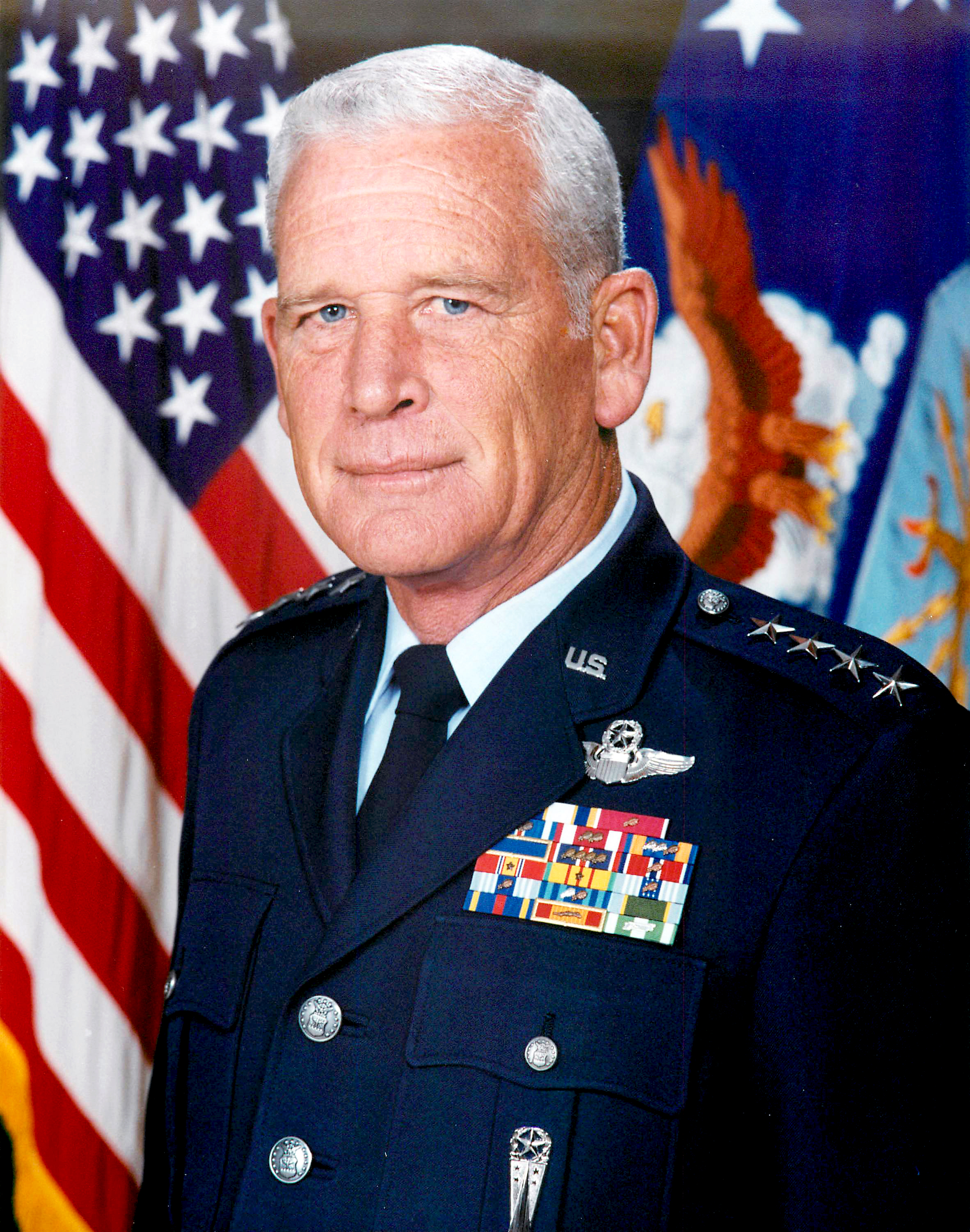
Robert L. Rutherford
General, United States Air Force

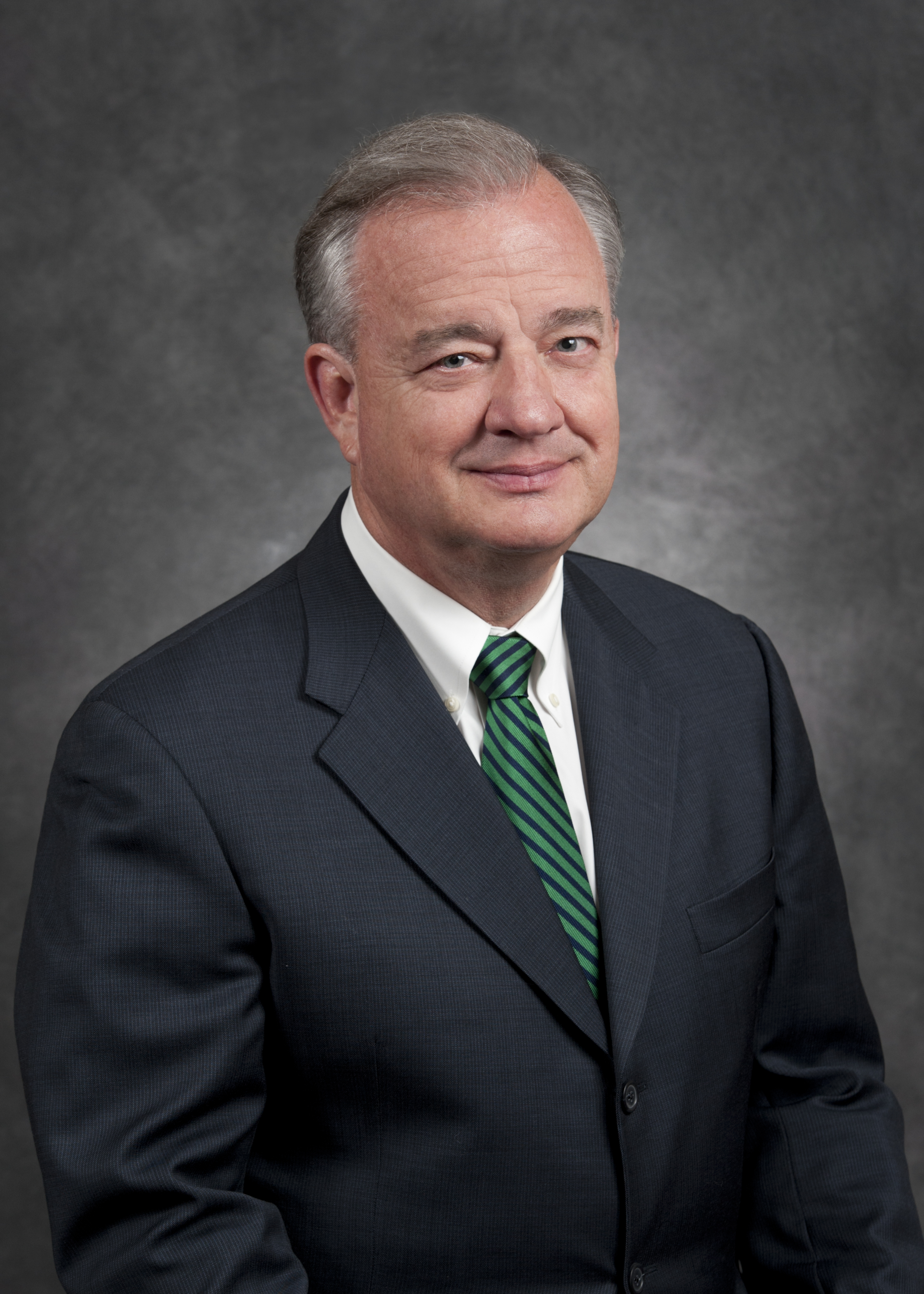
John Sharp
14th Chancellor of the Texas A&M University System

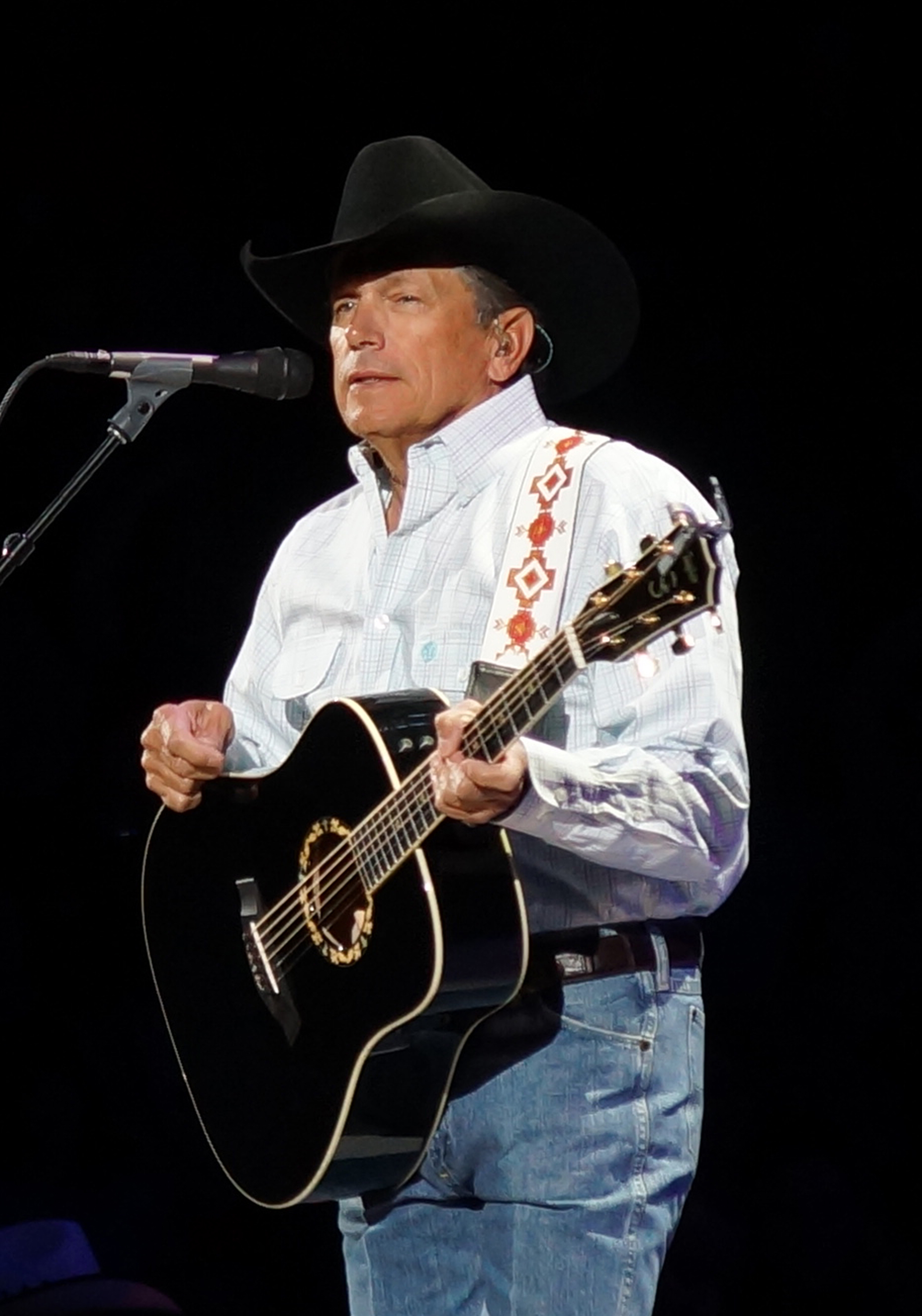
George Strait
Country music singer

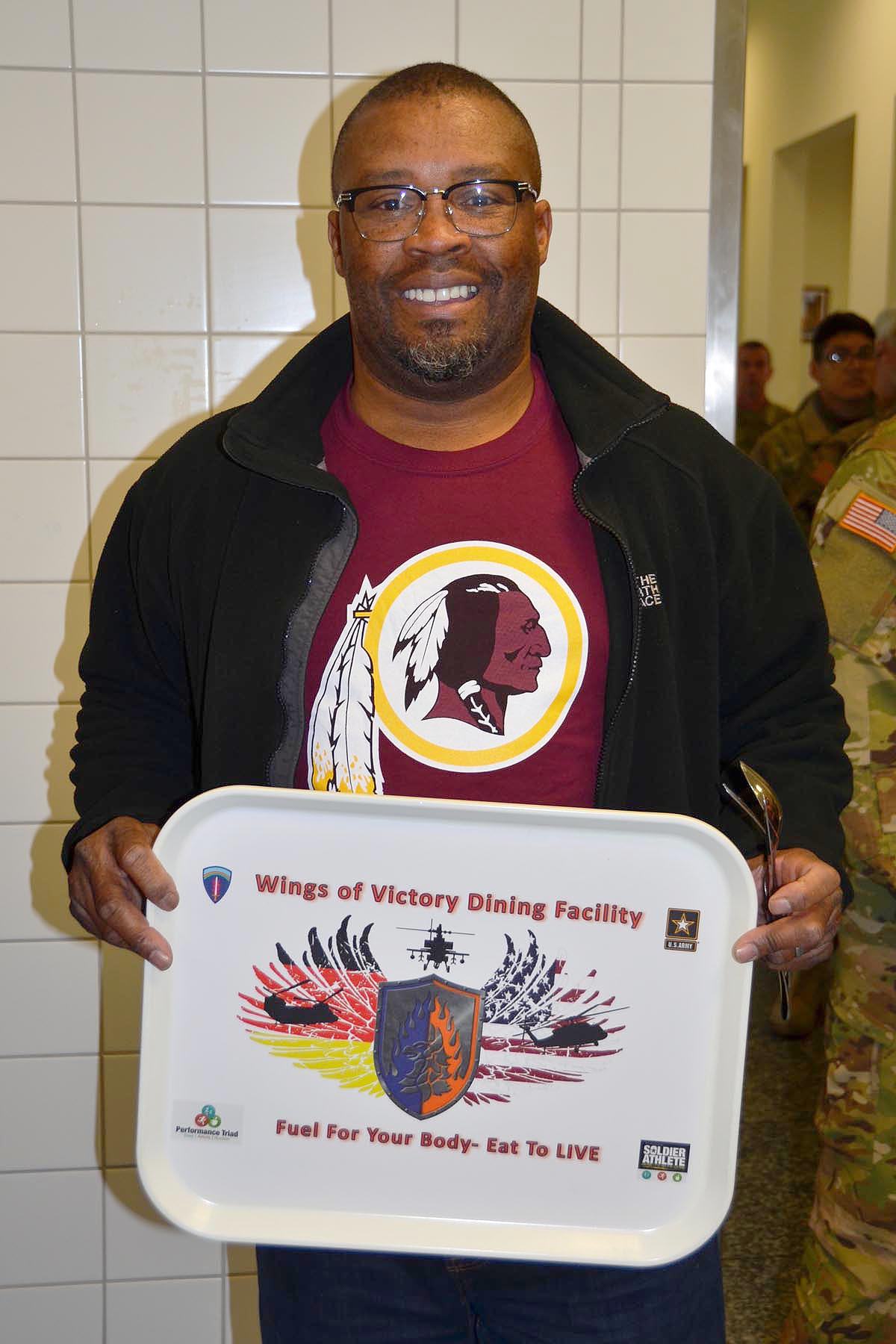
Ricky Sanders
2× Super Bowl champion (XXII, XXVI)

Texas State University's most notable alumnus is U.S. president Lyndon B. Johnson. Johnson attended the university, then known as the Southwest Texas State Teachers College, from 1926 until 1930 when he earned his Bachelor of Science degree. As a student, Johnson participated on the debate team and was an editor for the student newspaper, then known as the College Star. Johnson remains the only U.S. president who graduated from a university in the state of Texas.

Another notable alumnus is Grammy Award-winning American country music singer George Strait. Strait graduated in 1979 from the university, then known as Southwest Texas State University, with a Bachelor of Science in agriculture. As a student, Strait performed his first show with the Ace in the Hole Band at Cheatham Street Warehouse in San Marcos. In 2006, Strait was given an honorary Doctor of Humane Letters by university president Denise Trauth.

Also notable is the writer, producer, and director Taylor Sheridan. Sheridan attended Texas State University as a Theater Arts major but dropped out after his junior year. In 2025, he was awarded an honorary doctorate by the university.

Other notable alumni include country musician Sunny Sweeney; actress Edi Patterson; musician Randy Rogers; comedian Devon Walker, General Robert L. Rutherford, United States Air Force; musician Scott H. Biram; actor Powers Boothe; writer Tomás Rivera; Texas state representative Alfred P.C. Petsch; columnist "Heloise" (Ponce Cruse Evans); mathematician and former president of the American Mathematical Society R. H. Bing; professional baseball player Paul Goldschmidt; professional wrestler Lance Archer (Lance Hoyt); Texas musician Charlie Robison; and military historian Alan C. Carey.
