= Nielsen-Massey Vanillas =

Vanilla and flavor extract company based in Waukegan, Illinois

Nielsen-Massey Vanillas is a family-owned vanilla and flavor extract company based in Waukegan, Illinois and Leeuwarden, Netherlands. Founded in 1907, its products are sold in retail outlets as well as to foodservice and manufacturing customers.

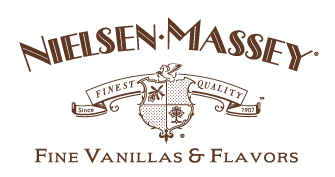

== Company history ==
The company was founded in 1907 by Otis Kline and Richard Massey. Headquartered in Sterling, Illinois, it was then called Massey's and was focused on the production of fragrances for cleaning products. In 1917, the company moved to Webster Avenue in Chicago to be closer to a transportation hub, and Chatfield Nielsen Sr. joined the company's leadership. Nielsen and Massey worked together to focus the company on manufacturing a variety of vanillas and other flavors, primarily for sale to food manufacturers. In 1954, upon the passing of Richard Massey, Nielsen purchased the company from the Massey family. His son Chatfield Jr. (Chat) joined the company in 1958 and ultimately become vice president in 1963. This same year, the company was renamed Nielsen-Massey. Chat later succeeded his father as president and focused on making Nielsen-Massey “pure vanilla specialists”— producing only all-natural vanilla products. In 1979, Chat's wife Camilla joined the company's leadership team.

Until the early 1980s, Nielsen-Massey only sold its products to industrial and foodservice customers. But in 1980, they were contacted by a then-unknown Chuck Williams, who wanted to place an order for 20,000 bottles of vanilla extract to sell at his retail store—then just a hardware store in Sonoma, California that also sold French cookware. That initial order led Nielsen-Massey to create a retail product line, bottling 8 oz. packages exclusively for Williams Sonoma, and Nielsen-Massey has continued to be sold in its stores, catalogs, and website ever since. In 1984, the company moved out of downtown Chicago, relocating its production to suburban Lake Forest, Illinois, and later moving to Waukegan in 1992 in order to increase plant size and expand production. After Chat's passing in 1992, Camilla took over company leadership. The third generation of the Nielsen family started joining the company in 1986, with the addition of Chat and Camilla's oldest son Craig, followed by younger son Matt in 1994. In 2006, their daughter Beth also joined the company.

The company expanded in the 1990s, first with the plant move to Waukegan, then with the opening of Nielsen-Massey Vanillas International, LLC in Leeuwarden, Netherlands in 1995. They also developed new vanilla products beyond just traditional extract, starting with Madagascar Bourbon Pure Vanilla Powder in 1995, then with Madagascar Bourbon Pure Vanilla Bean Paste in 1998. In 2005, the company introduced a line of flavor extracts, including almond, chocolate, coffee, orange, and peppermint. Also in 2005, Camilla Nielsen retired from Nielsen-Massey (although she remained chairman of the board until 2016), and her children Craig, Matt, and later Beth took on leadership of the company.

In 2017, the company established an outside board of directors and Kirk Trofholz became CEO. In 2018, it announced No Sugar Added Vanilla Extract and an organic line of flavor extracts.

== Leadership ==
In 2017, the company brought in an outside CEO, Kirk Trofholz, for the first time. In 2020, Jonathan Thompson joined the company as its new CEO.

Craig Nielsen, currently Vice President of Sustainability, is frequently interviewed about vanilla sourcing in the major growing regions, and also educates culinary students on the difference between vanilla varietals. Beth Nielsen, who serves as Chief Culinary Officer, has expertise on the use of vanilla in various food applications. Matt Nielsen, currently Vice President of Strategic Initiatives, was from 2008 to 2018 a director and officer of the Specialty Food Association, a food industry body.

== Charitable initiatives ==
The company donates 10% of profits annually to the Nielsen-Massey Foundation, which is chaired by Camilla Nielsen.

Nielsen-Massey is a founding member of the Sustainable Vanilla Initiative (SVI).
