= Beyond Good =

American confectioner

- Company type: Private
- Industry: Chocolate and vanilla products
- Founded: 2008
- Founder: Tim McCollum, Brett Beach
- Headquarters: Brooklyn, New York, United States
- Website: beyondgood.com

Beyond Good, formerly known as Madécasse, is a Brooklyn-based chocolate and vanilla company. It was established in 2008 by Brett Beach and Tim McCollum. The company sells a range of single-origin chocolate bars and vanilla products sourced from the island of Madagascar. All of their cocoa is certified direct trade and is sourced directly from Malagasy and Ugandan cocoa farmers. For several years, Beyond Good worked with a local chocolate producer in Antananarivo before moving its production facility to Madagascar and Europe.

== History ==
Brett Beach and Tim McCollum met while Peace Corps volunteers in Madagascar. After eight years on the island, McCollum and Beach devised their business model. Beach and McCollum wanted to produce chocolate on the island.

Beach and McCollum started Madécasse at Beach's residence in Lawrence, Kansas. They partnered with cocoa farmers of the Ezaka Cooperative. The company initially had trouble meeting the quality standards of the United States, as the cocoa beans needed more fermentation and drying. The farmers received training, equipment was purchased, and a bonus program for the company was developed.

According to Malagasy-born Michaël Chauveau, Director of Operations in Madagascar, Madécasse partnered with a factory on the island that has steadily increased its production outcome. As the company expanded, it partnered with more farming cooperatives to meet rising demand.

Beyond Good exports vanilla beans and extracts from Madagascar. Beyond Good has offices in Brooklyn and Madagascar.

In January 2020, the company officially changed its name from Madécasse to Beyond Good.

The company introduced a line of Ugandan chocolate bars in early 2020.

== Recognition ==
In 2010, Beyond Good was included in Food & Wine's list of 40 Big Thinkers 40 & Under. In 2011, it was listed as one of the World's 50 Most Innovative Companies by Fast Company. Beyond Good was named a Leader of Global Change in 2012 by the United Nations and Foundation for Social Change. In the same year, the brand also won the Good Food Award in the Chocolate category. In 2022, it received the Good Egg Award on the 2022 Chocolate Scorecard for its work with human rights and environmental issues such as traceability and transparency, living income, child labor, deforestation and climate, agroforestry, and agrochemical management.
