= List of caves in Texas =

List of caves in Texas Is a list of caves in the U.S. state of Texas. Some caves are show caves, and some are natural caves.

== List of caves ==
- Airmen's Cave: Travis County. 3,444 metres (11,299 ft) long.
- Baker Cave: Val Verde County. 120 feet long by 56 feet deep (37 m × 17 m).
- Bracken Cave (Bracken Bat Cave): Comal County. 136 metres (446 ft) in length and 35.7 metres (117 ft) deep. An estimated 20 million Mexican free-tailed bats roost in the cave at times.
- Cambria Cavern: Williamson and Travis counties. 70 metres (230 ft) in length and 7 metres (23 ft) deep.
- Cascade Caverns: Kendall County. 132 feet (40 m) at Cathedral Room and 1/2 mile (0.80 km) in length.
- Cave Without a Name: National Natural Landmark Show cave since 1939, in Kendall County. Mapped in 1975 at 2.7 mi (4.3 km).
- Caverns of Sonora: National Natural Landmark (1965) in Sutton County
- Devil's Sinkhole: Edwards County. 329.5 metres (1,081 ft) long and 107.0 metres (351.0 ft) deep.
- Goodenough Springs:
- Inner Space Cavern: Williamson County. Show cave since 1966
- Jacob's Well: Hays County, 1,618.8 metres (5,311 ft) in length and 41.8 metres (137 ft) deep.
- Kickapoo Cavern: Kinney County, 458.8 metres (1,505 ft) length and 39.7 metres (130 ft) deep.
- Langtry Lead Cave: Val Verde County 1,053.1 metres (3,455 ft) in length and 106.2 metres (348 ft) deep.
- Longhorn Cavern:
- Natural Bridge Caverns: 5,938.5 metres (19,483 ft) in length and 70.0 metres (229.7 ft) deep.
- Phantom Lake Spring Cave: Jeff Davis County. 3,440.3 metres (11,287 ft) in length and 182.7 metres (599 ft) deep. The Comanche Springs pupfish lives in the springs.
- Rock Dove Cave
- Sorcerer's Cave: Terrell County. 3,510 metres (11,520 ft) in length and 173.7 metres (570 ft) deep.
- Spring Creek Cave
- Whiteface Cave: San Saba County.
- Wizard's Well Cavern: Terrell County. 2,007.1 metres (6,585 ft) and 118.3 metres (388 ft) deep.
- Wonder Cave
