= Wonder World (Texas) =

Natural amusement park in San Marcos, Texas

Coordinates: 29.8779°N 97.9567°W

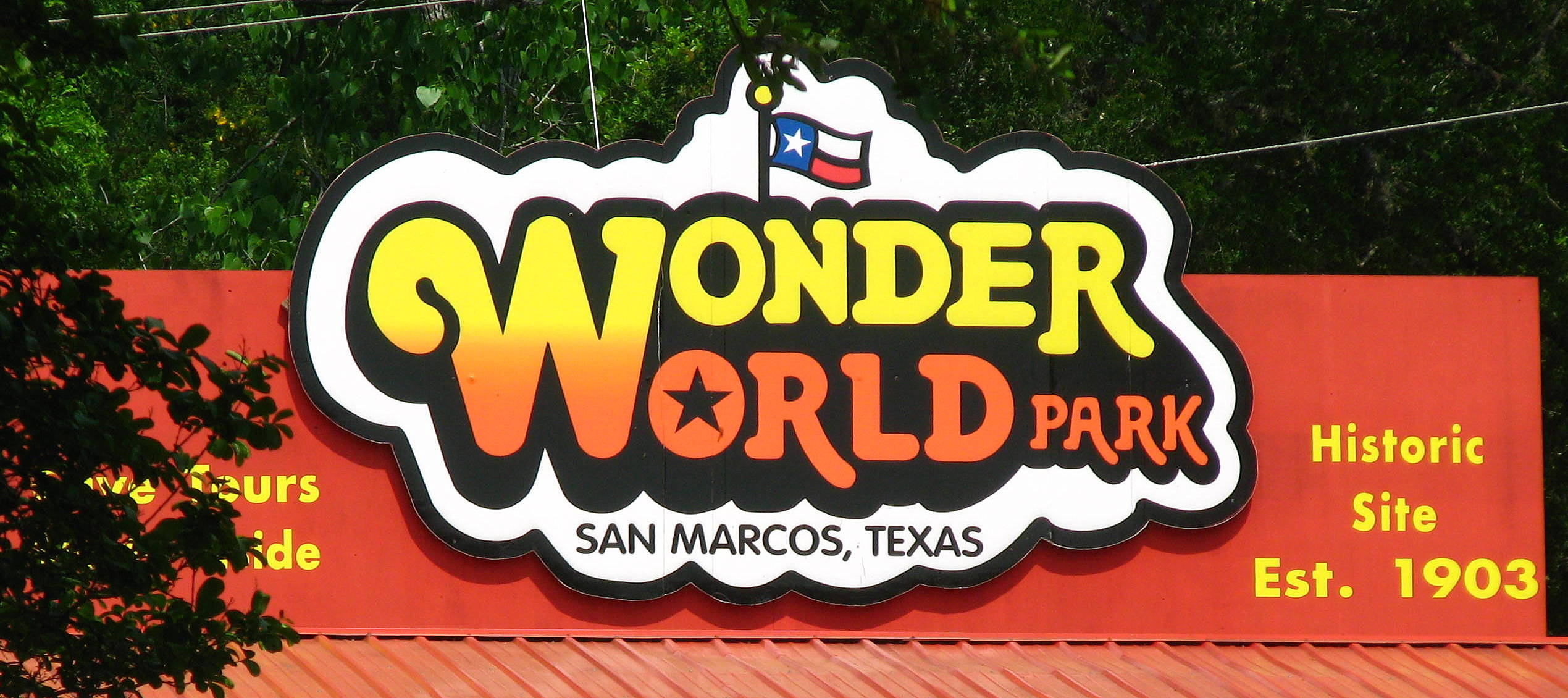
Wonder World

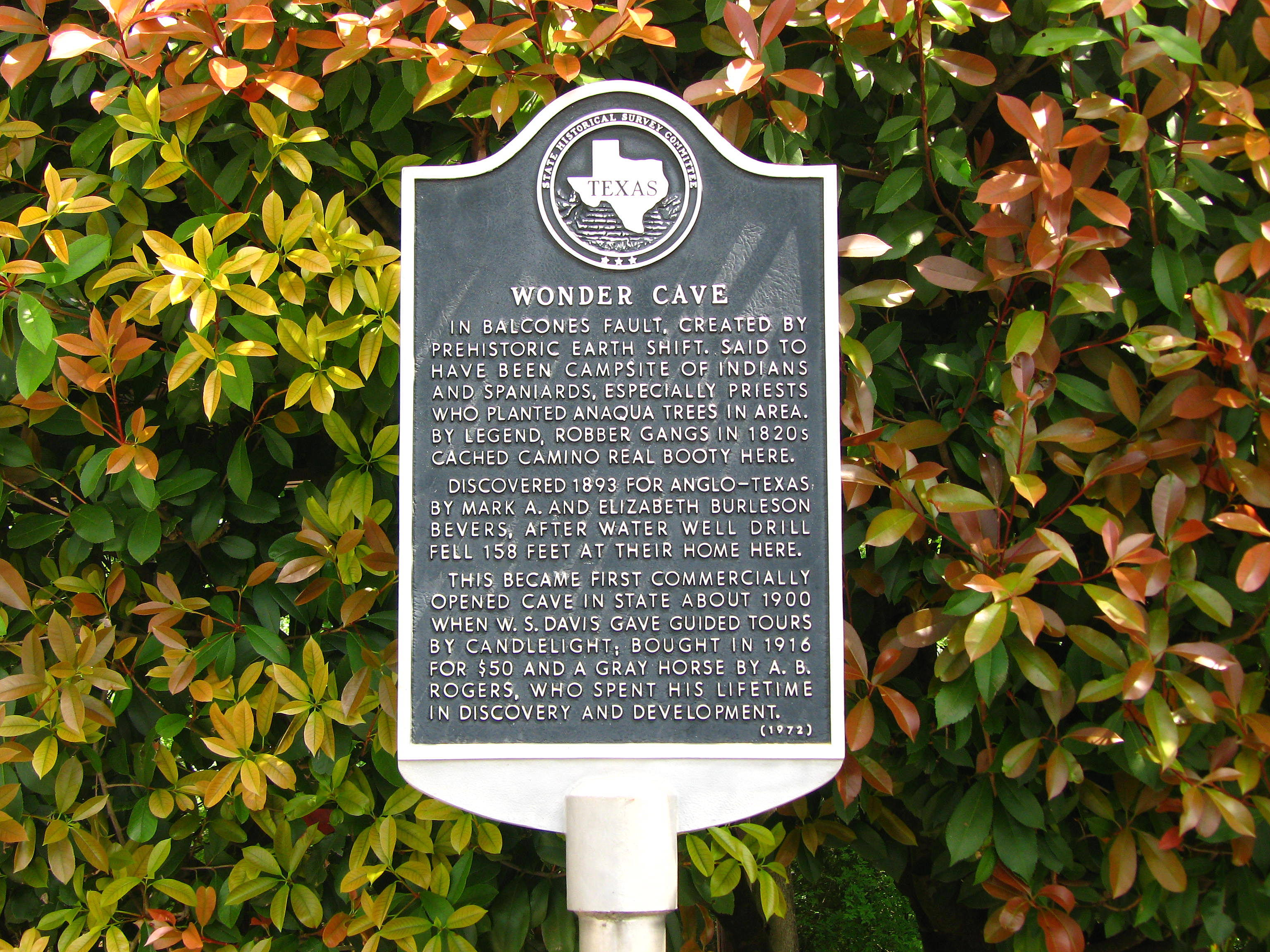
An informational sign explaining the history of Wonder Cave

Wonder World is a natural theme park located in San Marcos, Texas. The park's primary attraction is Wonder Cave, an ancient earthquake cave and Recorded Texas Historic Landmark. Other attractions include an anti-gravity house, a trackless motor train, and a wildlife park.
