= San Marcos Mill Tract =

Historical place in Texas

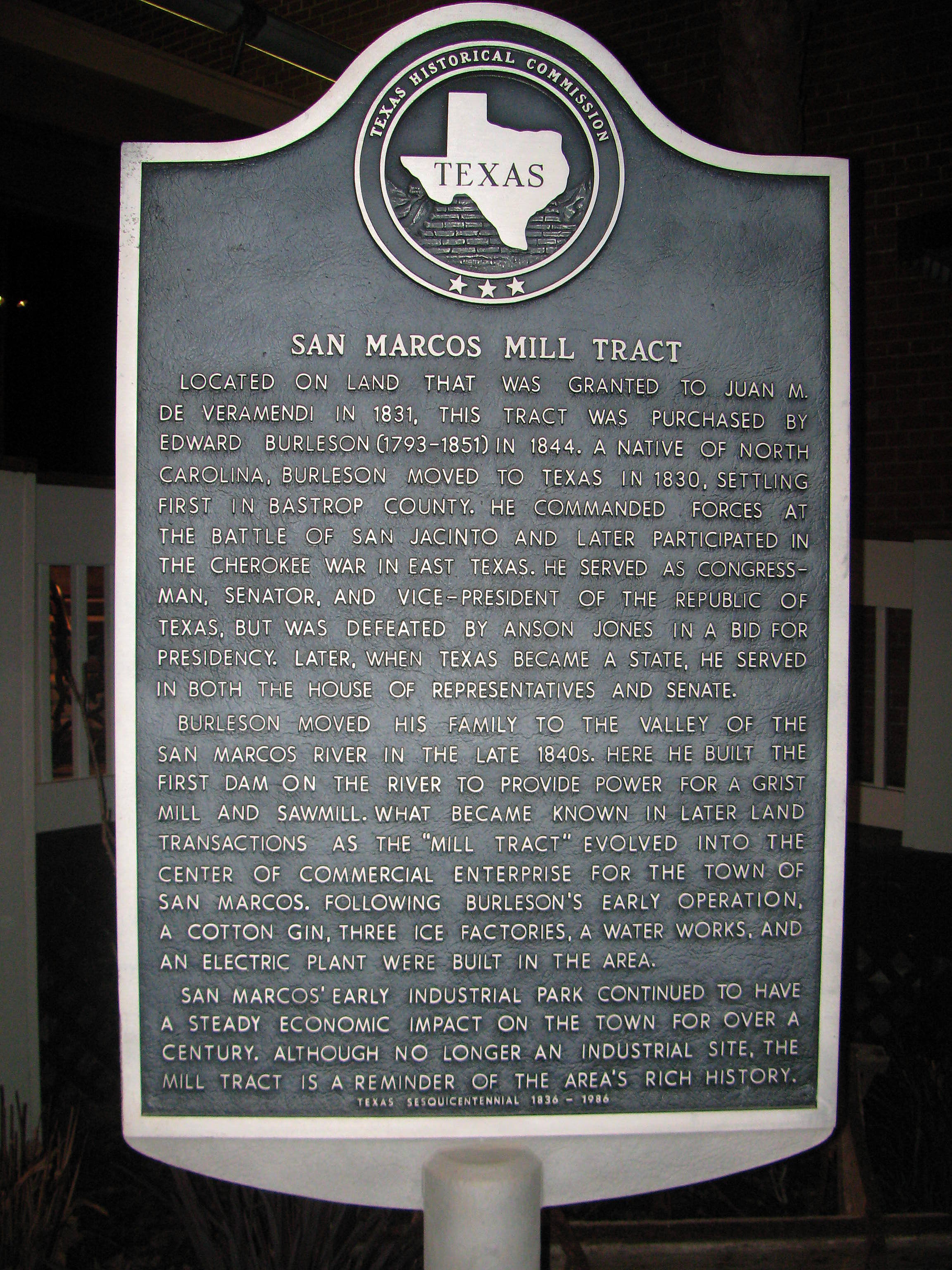
An informative historical landmark sign

The San Marcos Mill Tract is a historical tract of land located in San Marcos, Texas. It is recognized as a historic place by the Texas Historical Commission.

== History ==
The tract is located on land that was granted to Juan M. de Veramendi in 1831.

The property was later purchased in 1844 by Edward Burleson, where he built the first dam on the San Marcos River, simultaneously providing power for a grist mill and sawmill. The tract was later used as a cotton gin, three different icehouses, a waterworks, and an electric power plant. The tract evolved into an industrial park, substantially impacting the local economy.

In more recent years, the tract has served as the site of various scenic restaurants overlooking the headwaters of the San Marcos River. Over the past several decades, these popular restaurants have included Pepper's at the Falls, Joe's Crab Shack, Saltgrass Steak House, and the current San Marcos location of Kerbey Lane Cafe, which originated in Austin, TX.
