= Wonder Cave (San Marcos, Texas) =

Cave in Texas, US

Coordinates: 29.8779°N 97.9567°W

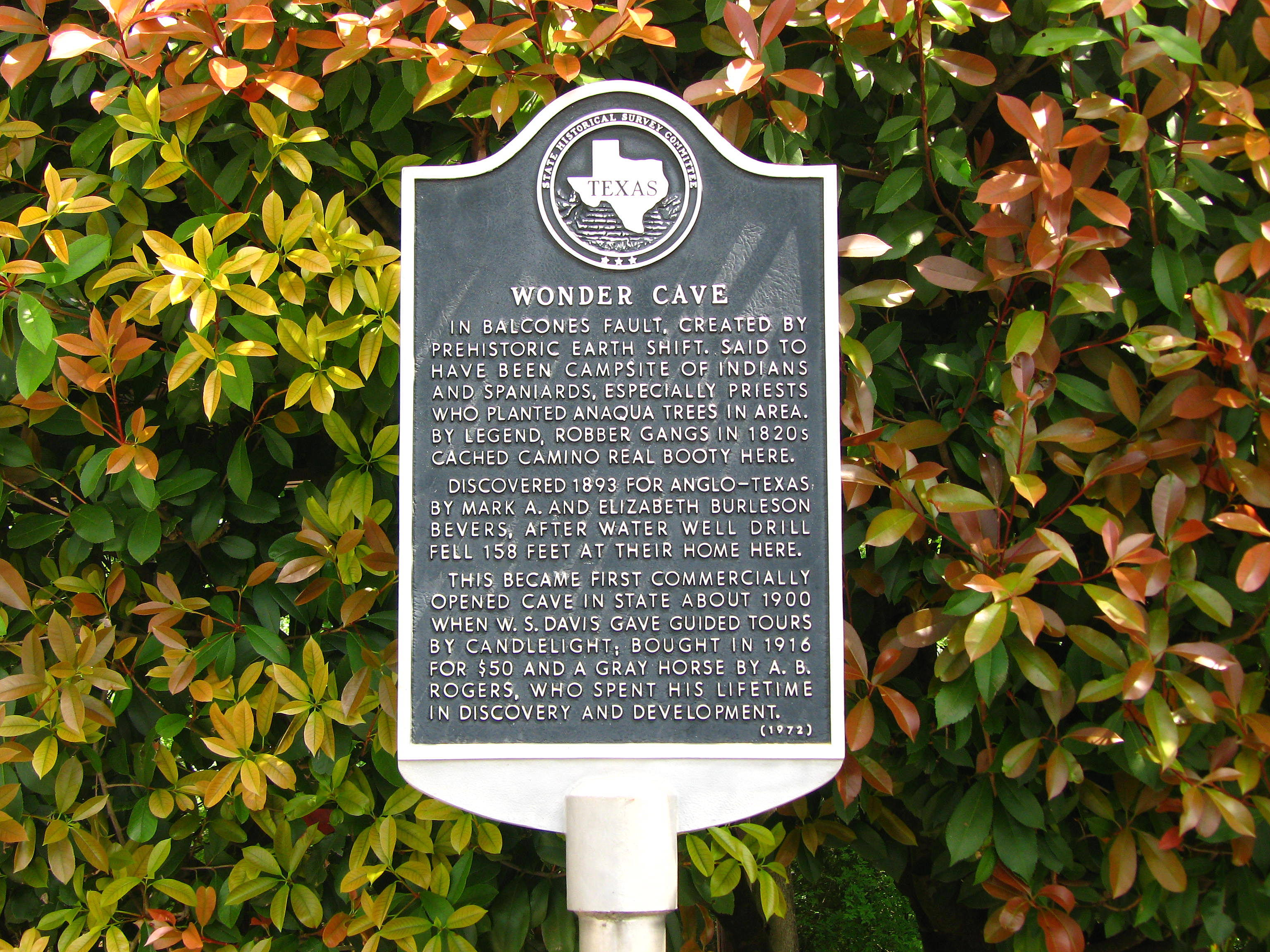
An informational sign elaborating on the history of Wonder Cave

Wonder Cave is a show cave located in the Balcones Fault in San Marcos, Texas. Its entrance is one mile southwest of the Hays County Courthouse. The cave is reported to be the only commercially operated dry-formed cave in the United States ("dry-formed" because the fissure was opened not by erosion but by the earthquake that produced the Balcones Fault). The fault itself is visible in the cave's ceiling. Originally named Bevers Cave after Mark Bevers, who discovered it in 1893, the cave for a while concealed Bevers' illicit distilling and gambling enterprises.

The cave is also home to the Wonder World amusement park, that features tours of the multichambered cave and a wildlife park. .

== See also ==
List of caves in Texas
