= San Marcos Outlet Malls =

Two malls in the city of San Marcos, Texas

Coordinates: 29.826666°N 97.984162°W

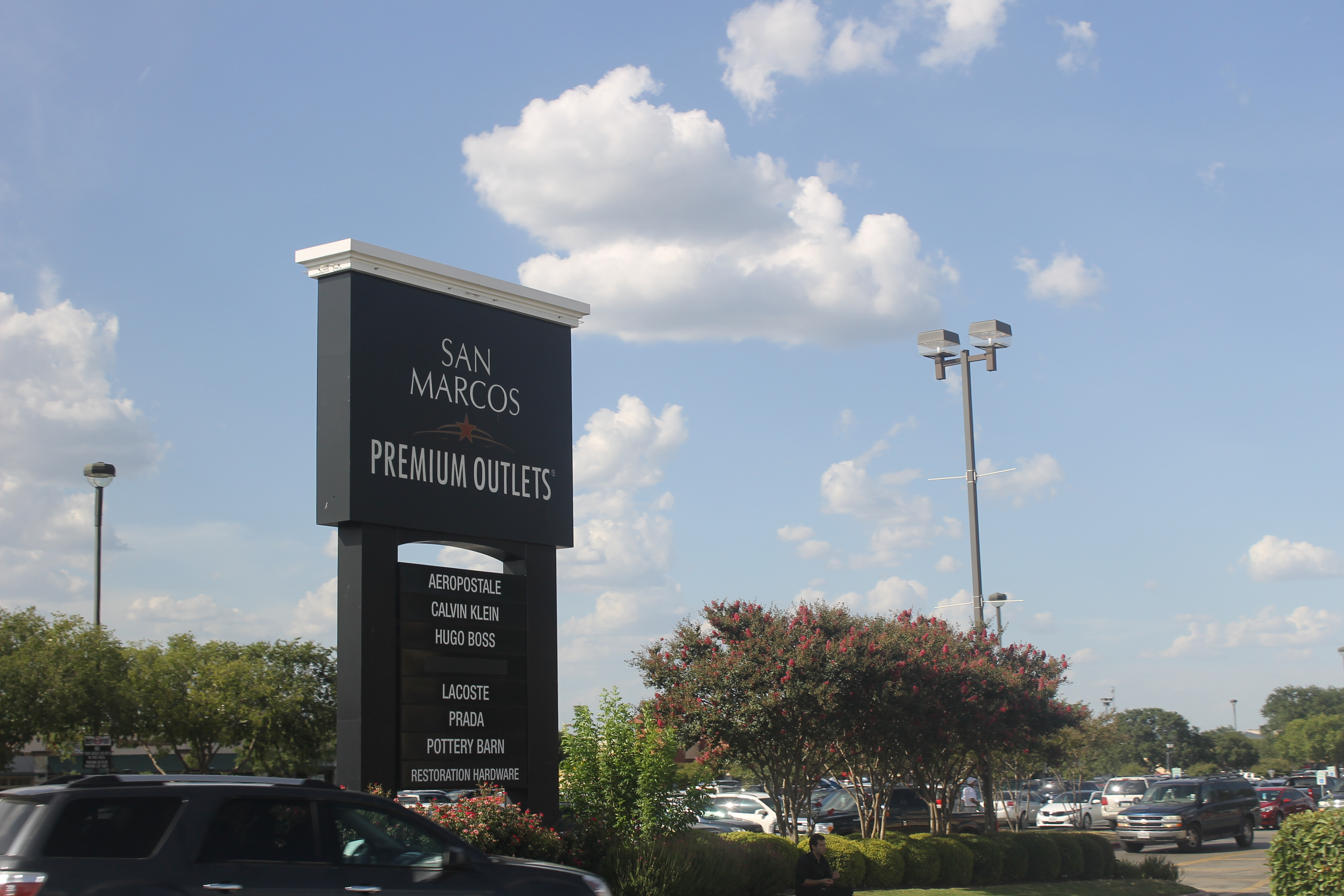
Entrance to Premium Outlets in San Marcos, Texas

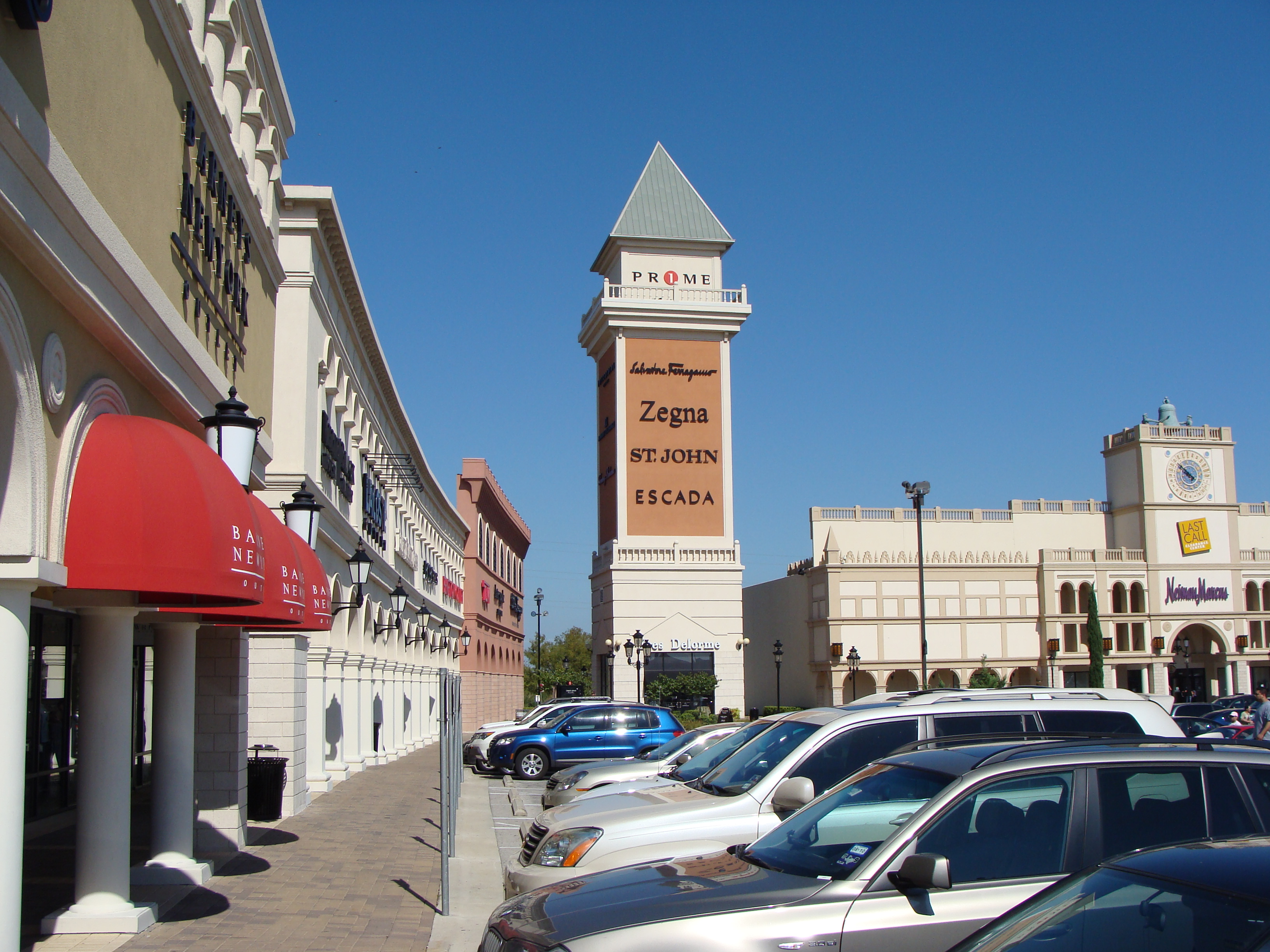
Premium Outlets in San Marcos

The San Marcos Outlet Malls are two distinct outlet malls, the Premium Outlets and the Tanger Factory Outlet Center, located off Interstate Highway 35 in San Marcos, Texas, United States. Combined, the two adjacent malls have more than 240 stores, and an excess of 1,000,000 sq ft (93,000 m^{2}). The outlet malls contains stores like Pottery Barn, Burlington, H&M, Polo Ralph Lauren, RH Outlet, and Old Navy Outlet. The Premium Outlets was formerly known as the Prime Outlets San Marcos until 2012.

During peak seasons, shoppers at the malls can reach numbers that effectively triple the population of San Marcos. The San Marcos Outlet Malls are one of the top tourist attractions in the state, and serve as one of the top employers of San Marcos residents and students of nearby Texas State University.

In 2006, ABC's The View named the San Marcos Outlets the third-best place to shop in the world.

Originally, the Premium Outlets was known under the name Prime Outlets San Marcos until its acquisition by Simon Property Group in 2012, which resulted in the name change to San Marcos Premium Outlets.

In October 2022, Burlington opened in the Premium Outlets, replacing its former Saks Off Fifth.
