= San Marcos, Texas =

City in Texas, United States

- City
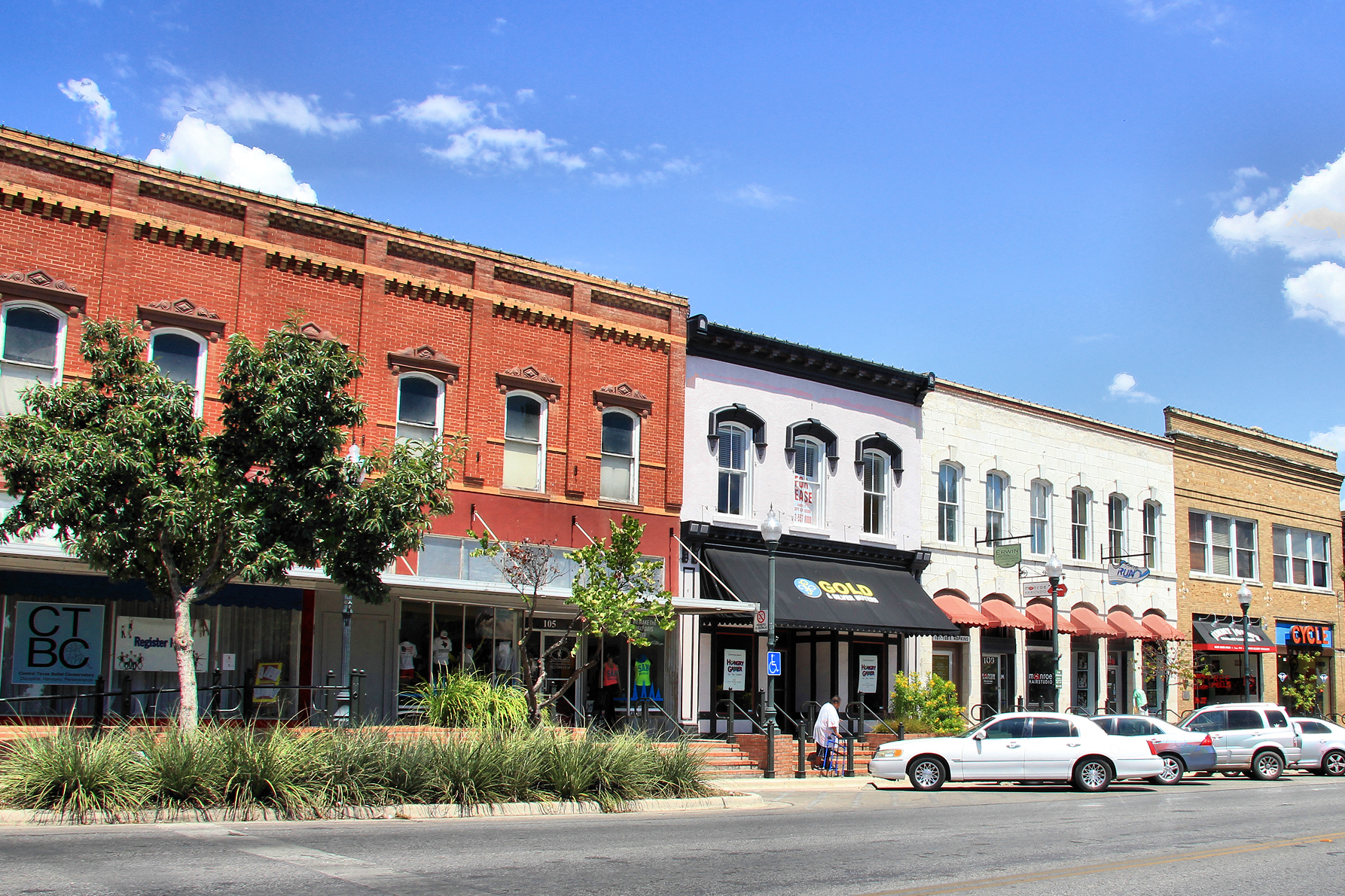
- Hays County Courthouse Historic District

- Seal
- Nickname: San Marvelous
- Coordinates: 29°52′46″N 97°56′20″W
- Country: United States
- State: Texas
- Counties: Hays, Caldwell, Guadalupe
- Incorporated: 1851

Government
  - Type: Council-Manager

Area
  - Total: 35.71 sq mi (92.50 km^{2})
  - Land: 35.59 sq mi (92.18 km^{2})
  - Water: 0.12 sq mi (0.32 km^{2})
- Elevation: 574 ft (175 m)

Population (2020)
  - Total: 67,553
  - Estimate (2025): 77,830
  - Density: 1,820/sq mi (702.7/km^{2})
- Demonym(s): San Marcoan, San Martian
- Time zone: UTC-6 (CST)
  - Summer (DST): UTC-5 (CDT)
- ZIP codes: 78666–78667
- Area codes: 512 and 737
- FIPS code: 48-65600
- GNIS feature ID: 2411798
- Website: www.sanmarcostx.gov

San Marcos (/ˌsæn ˈmɑːrkəs/) is a city in and the county seat of Hays County, Texas, United States. The city is mostly a part of the Greater Austin metropolitan area. San Marcos's limits extend into Caldwell and Guadalupe Counties, as well. The latter is part of the Greater San Antonio Metropolitan Area. San Marcos is on the Interstate 35 corridor between Austin and San Antonio. Its population was 44,894 at the 2010 census and 67,553 at the 2020 census. Founded on the banks of the San Marcos River, the area is thought to be among the oldest continuously inhabited sites in the Americas. San Marcos is home to Texas State University and the Meadows Center for Water and the Environment.

In 2010, San Marcos was listed in Business Week's fourth annual survey of the "Best Places to Raise your Kids". In 2013 and 2014, the United States Census Bureau named it the fastest-growing city in the United States. In December 2013, it was named number nine on Business Insider's list of the "10 Most Exciting Small Cities in America".

== History ==
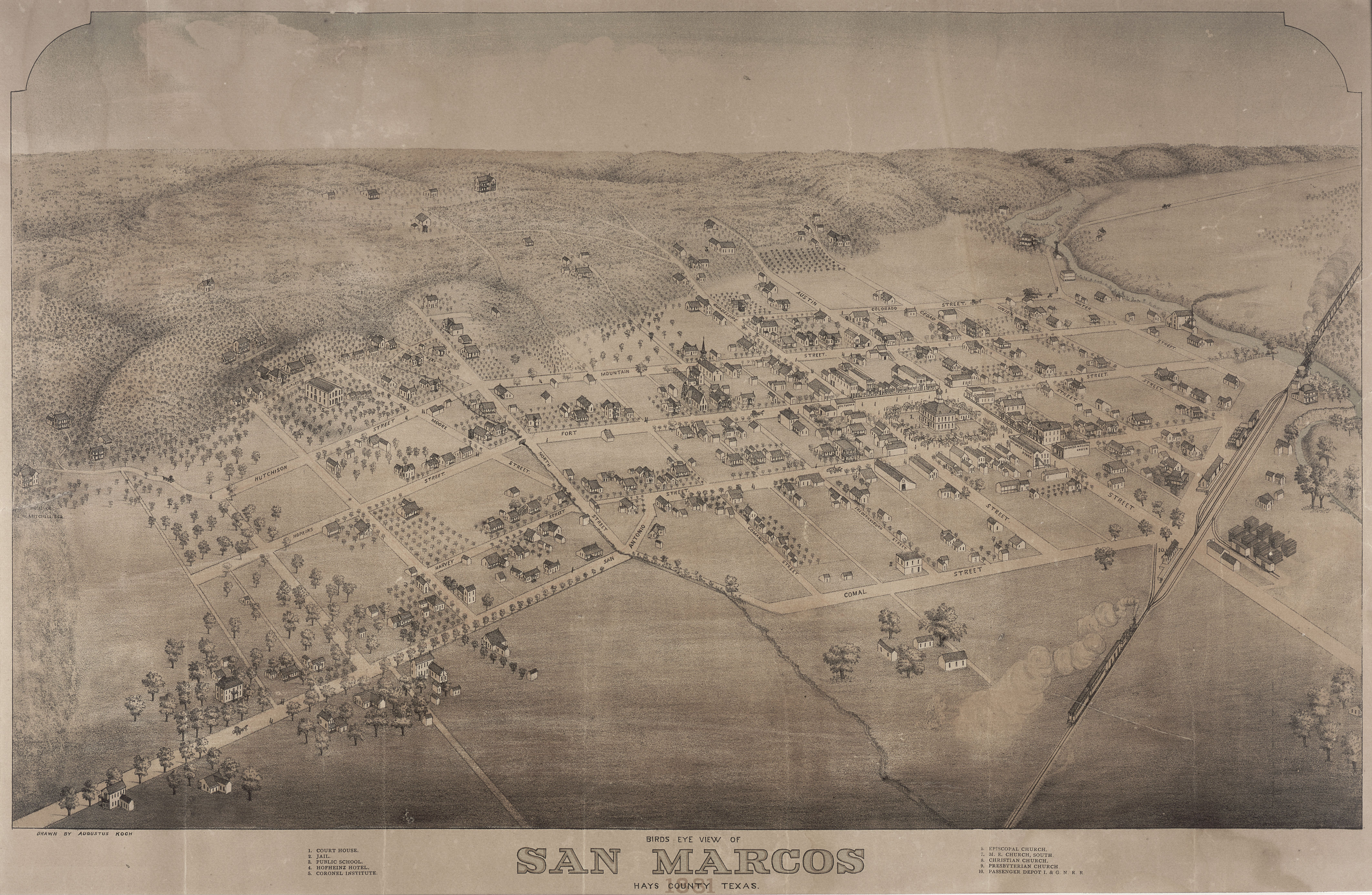
San Marcos in 1881

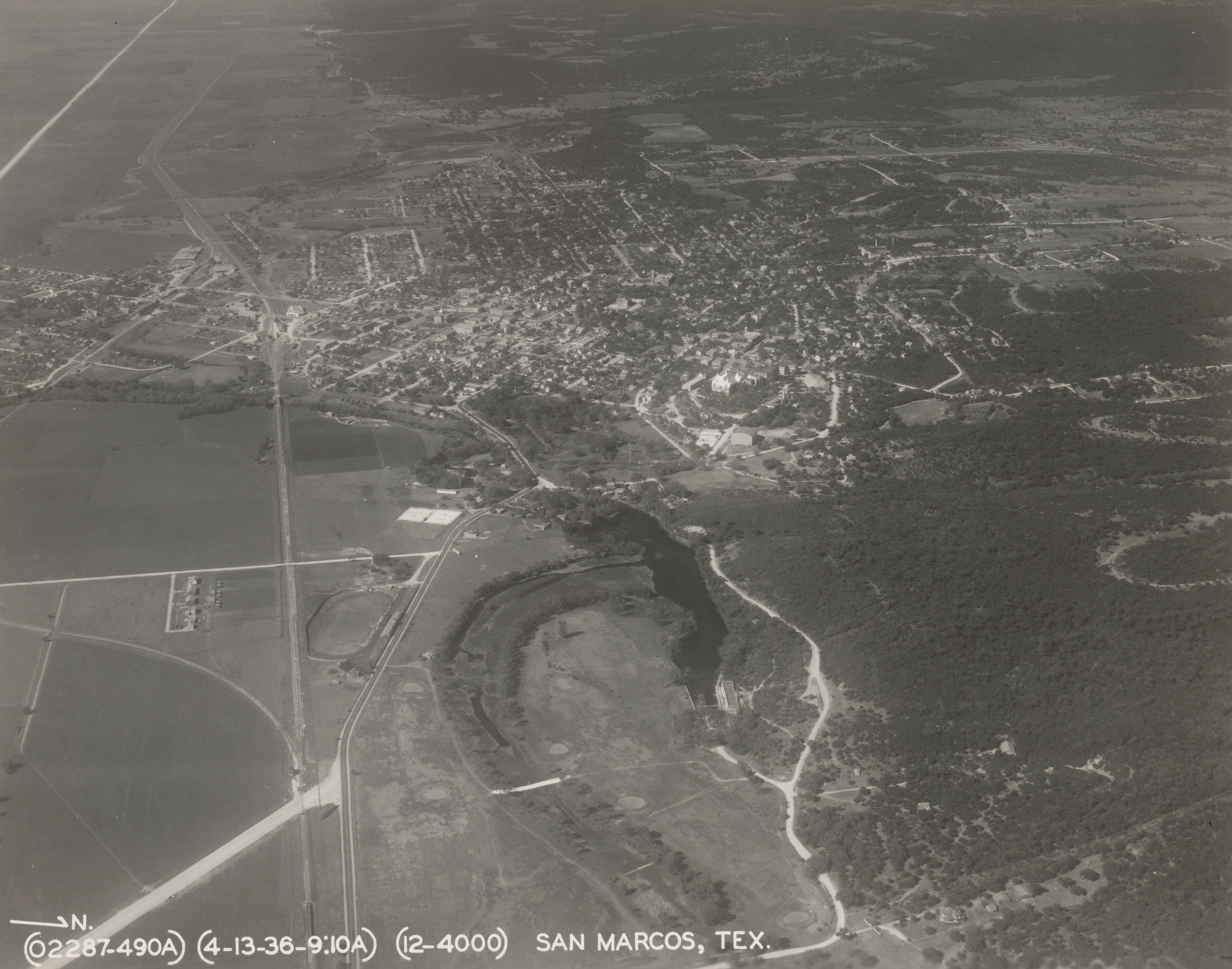
San Marcos in 1936

Archeologists have found evidence at the San Marcos River associated with the Clovis culture, which suggests that the river has been the site of human habitation for more than 10,000 years. The San Marcos Springs are the third-largest collection of springs in Texas. Never in recorded history has the river run dry.

In 1689, Spaniard Alonso de León led an expedition from Mexico to explore Texas and establish missions and presidios in the region. De León's party helped blaze the Camino Real (later known as the Old San Antonio Road), which followed present-day Hunter Road, Hopkins Street, and Aquarena Springs Drive (the route later shifted four miles to the south; it is now followed by County Road 266, known locally as Old Bastrop Highway). De León's party reached the river on April 25, the feast day of St. Mark the Evangelist; the river was thus named the San Marcos.

In 1803, after the Louisiana purchase, the Spanish government in Mexico became concerned about American citizens moving into Texas. Officials decided to establish more Spanish settlements between San Antonio de Béxar and Nacogdoches in an effort to secure Spanish presence in the area. The governor of the province of Texas, Manuel Antonio Cordero y Bustamante, approached his friend Felipe Roque de la Portilla to organize and oversee the venture. In 1807, after extracting promises from Cordero that he would receive a substantial land grant and that the government would assist the settlers financially, Portilla headed for Texas with a small group of settlers. The exact number has been disputed; some suggest that only 10 persons were in the original group, while other sources say the number was as high as 52. Also, some conflict exists in records as to whether Portilla's family was in the original group or whether they arrived in the fall of 1808. Most sources agree the group arrived at the San Marcos River on January 6, 1808. In April, Governor Cordero issued the official order that established San Marcos de Neve, and his military representative, Juan Ygnacio de Arrambide, issued 13 titles to town lots. Disaster struck the settlers in June, when a flood washed them out of their homes. Throughout the summer and fall, the settlers rebuilt their town. In letters to government officials, Portilla reported that he left the colony in September 1808 to get more settlers and returned with six new families in late October. While no other records confirm the increase, Portilla's census of 1809 did show a total of 73 persons and 1,771 animals. Over the next three years, the settlers made a valiant effort to maintain their new homes, but frequent Indian raids and the failure of the government to send soldiers for protection forced them to abandon the settlement in 1812. The settlers were plagued by floods and Indian raids, and the settlement was abandoned in 1812.

In November 1846, the first Anglo-American settlers moved into the vicinity of the San Marcos Springs. The Texas Legislature organized Hays County on March 1, 1848, and designated San Marcos as the county seat. In 1851, a town center was laid out about a mile southwest of the headwaters of the river. The town became a center for ginning and milling local agricultural products. The town's most notable founder and early settler was Gen. Edward Burleson, a hero of the Texas Revolution and former vice president of the Republic of Texas. Burleson built a dam on the upper reaches of the river in 1849. The dam powered several mills, including one within present-day Sewell Park.

In the decade following the arrival of the International-Great Northern Railroad on September 30, 1880, cattle and cotton provided the basis for the growth of San Marcos as a center for commerce and transportation.

In 1866, the Coronal Institute was established as an early private high school. In 1899, Southwest Texas State Normal School (now known as Texas State University) was established as a teacher's college to meet demand for public-school teachers in Texas. In 1907, the San Marcos Baptist Academy was established, furthering education as an important industry for the town. The demands of World War II forced the town's industry to diversify, and with the emergence of a manufacturing and light industrial sector, the town began to experience growth.

In the late 1940s, former Hollywood director Shadrack Graham produced a documentary about daily life in San Marcos as part of his "Our Hometown" series of films that encouraged commerce and civic activity in small communities. The film highlights several local businesses from the era, including Smith's Flowers, Waldrin's Cleaners, Lack's Furniture, and the Palace Movie Theater.

Gary Air Force Base, just east of town, was opened in 1942 as San Marcos Army Airfield, renamed San Marcos Air Force Base in 1947, and renamed finally in 1953 in honor of Lieutenant Arthur Edward Gary, killed at Clark Field in the Philippines on December 7, 1941, the first San Martian to die in World War II. During the war, the base trained over 10,000 navigators, and in the following years, it was the largest center of Air Force and Army helicopter training for pilots and mechanics in the United States, with 21 squadrons and 4800 personnel stationed there. The base was handed over to the Army in 1956, renamed Camp Gary, and was closed in 1963. Subsequently, part of the base was taken over by the city for use as San Marcos Airport, while another part was reopened in 1966 as the Gary Job Corps Center.

In the 1960s, with the establishment of Aquarena Springs and Wonder World as attractions, the tourist industry became a growing part of the city's economy. By the 1960s, what was then named Southwest Texas State University had grown into an important regional institution, and when coupled with the creation of Gary Job Corps Training Center in 1965, education became the largest industry in San Marcos. The remarkable growth explosion of Austin further allowed San Marcos to prosper.

By 1973, San Marcos and Hays County were included by the U. S. Census Bureau in the Austin metropolitan statistical area. By that year, the city's population had grown to 25,000 citizens, along with an additional Southwest Texas State University student body of 20,000.

By 1990, the city's population had grown to 28,743; by 2000, it reached 34,733, and by 2010, it was 44,894. A report released by the U.S. Census Bureau in May 2013 stated that San Marcos had the highest rate of growth among all U.S. cities and towns with at least 50,000 people. Its population rose 6.9% between 2011 and 2012. The university, now known as Texas State University, boasts a student body of 47,513 as of Fall 2026.

== Demographics ==
Historical population
Census	Pop.	Note	%±
1870	741		—
1880	1,232		66.3%
1890	2,335		89.5%
1900	2,292		−1.8%
1910	4,071		77.6%
1920	4,527		11.2%
1930	5,134		13.4%
1940	6,006		17.0%
1950	9,980		66.2%
1960	12,713		27.4%
1970	18,860		48.4%
1980	23,420		24.2%
1990	28,738		22.7%
2000	34,733		20.9%
2010	44,894		29.3%
2020	67,553		50.5%
2025 (est.)	77,830		15.2%
U.S. Decennial Census

As of the 2020 United States census, 67,553 people and 10,635 families were residing in the city.

=== Racial and ethnic composition ===
San Marcos city, Texas – Racial and ethnic composition Note: the US Census treats Hispanic/Latino as an ethnic category. This table excludes Latinos from the racial categories and assigns them to a separate category. Hispanics/Latinos may be of any race.
Race / Ethnicity (NH = Non-Hispanic)	Pop 2000	Pop 2010	Pop 2020	% 2000	% 2010	% 2020
White alone (NH)	19,165	24,098	28,505	55.18%	53.68%	42.20%
Black or African American alone (NH)	1,860	2,244	4,463	5.36%	5.00%	6.61%
Native American or Alaska Native alone (NH)	118	141	157	0.34%	0.31%	0.23%
Asian alone (NH)	418	659	1,930	1.20%	1.47%	2.86%
Native Hawaiian or Pacific Islander alone (NH)	34	35	54	0.10%	0.08%	0.08%
Other race alone (NH)	52	67	257	0.15%	0.15%	0.38%
Multiracial (NH)	410	683	4,747	1.18%	1.52%	7.03%
Hispanic or Latino (any race)	12,676	16,967	27,440	36.50%	37.79%	40.62%
Total	34,733	44,894	67,553	100.00%	100.00%	100.00%

=== 2020 census ===
As of the 2020 United States census, the median age was 23.7 years; 15.2% of residents were under 18 and 8.0% were 65 or older. For every 100 females, there were 92.8 males, and for every 100 females 18 and over, there were 91.3 males 18 and over.

About 98.3% of residents lived in urban areas, while 1.7% lived in rural areas.

Of the 26,954 households in San Marcos, 19.9% had children under 18 living in them, 22.2% were married-couple households, 32.4% were households with a male householder and no spouse or partner present, and 36.1% were households with a female householder and no spouse or partner present. About 36.4% of all households were made up of individuals, and 5.6% had someone living alone who was 65 or older.

The city had 29,680 housing units, of which 9.2% were vacant. The homeowner vacancy rate was 2.2% and the rental vacancy rate was 8.7%.

Racial composition as of the 2020 census
Race	Number	Percent
White	37,100	54.9%
Black or African American	4,868	7.2%
American Indian and Alaska Native	601	0.9%
Asian	2,013	3.0%
Native Hawaiian and other Pacific Islander	70	0.1%
Some other race	8,596	12.7%
Two or more races	14,305	21.2%
Hispanic or Latino (of any race)	27,440	40.6%

=== 2010 census ===
As of the census of 2010, 44,894 people lived in the city.

=== 2000 census ===
In 2000, 34,733 people, 12,660 households, and 5,380 families resided in the city. The population density was 1,907.5 people per square mile, (736.4/km^{2}) in 2000. The 13,340 housing units averaged 732.6 per square mile (282.8/km^{2}). The racial makeup of the city was 72.55% White, 5.53% African American, 0.65% Native American, 1.23% Asian, 0.11% Pacific Islander, 17.03% from other races, and 2.90% from two or more races. Hispanics or Latinos of any race were 36.50% of the population.

Of the 12,660 households, 19.2% had children under 18 living with them, 27.9% were married couples living together, 10.1% had a female householder with no husband present, and 57.5% were not families. About 31.0% of all households were made up of individuals, and 5.7% had someone living alone who was 65 or older. The average household size was 2.31, and the average family size was 3.08.

In the city, the population was distributed as 15.4% under 18, 41.9% from 18 to 24, 24.8% from 25 to 44, 10.7% from 45 to 64, and 7.2% who were 65 or older. The median age was 23 years. For every 100 females, there were 96.8 males. For every 100 females 18 and over, there were 95.4 males.

The median income in the city for a household was $25,809 and for a family was $37,113. Males had a median income of $25,400 versus $22,953 for females. The per capita income for the city was $13,468. About 13.8% of families and 28.5% of the population were below the poverty line, including 22.1% of those under 18 and 15.1% of those 65 or over.

== Geography ==
San Marcos is in Central Texas. It is 30 miles (48 km) southwest of Austin and 51 miles (82 km) northeast of San Antonio. According to the United States Census Bureau, in 2010, it had a total area of 30.3 square miles (78.6 km^{2}), of which 0.1 square miles (0.3 km^{2}), or 0.44%, was covered by water. Interstate 35 is the main highway through it, with access from exits 199 through 208. It is situated on the Balcones Fault, the boundary between the Hill Country to the west and the Coastal Plains to the east. Along the fault, many springs emerge, such as San Marcos Springs, which forms Spring Lake and is the source of the San Marcos River. The eastern part is Blackland Prairie. The western part consists of forested or grassy rolling hills, often marked with cacti.

The San Marcos River and the Blanco River, part of the Guadalupe watershed, flow through the city, along with Cottonwood Creek, Purgatory Creek, Sink Creek, and Willow Springs Creek.

=== Climate ===
The climate in this area is characterized by hot, humid summers and generally mild to cool winters, with some winter frost at night. The annual precipitation is about 36.55 inches (928 mm). According to the Köppen climate classification, San Marcos has a humid subtropical climate, Cfa on climate maps.

Climate data for San Marcos, Texas (1991–2020 normals, extremes 1895–present)
Month	Jan	Feb	Mar	Apr	May	Jun	Jul	Aug	Sep	Oct	Nov	Dec	Year
Record high °F (°C)	89 (32)	99 (37)	100 (38)	102 (39)	106 (41)	109 (43)	110 (43)	111 (44)	111 (44)	101 (38)	98 (37)	91 (33)	111 (44)
Mean maximum °F (°C)	78.6 (25.9)	83.1 (28.4)	87.4 (30.8)	91.1 (32.8)	94.8 (34.9)	99.1 (37.3)	101.1 (38.4)	102.5 (39.2)	98.9 (37.2)	92.7 (33.7)	85.1 (29.5)	80.3 (26.8)	103.9 (39.9)
Mean daily maximum °F (°C)	62.3 (16.8)	66.6 (19.2)	73.1 (22.8)	79.8 (26.6)	86.2 (30.1)	92.4 (33.6)	95.7 (35.4)	96.8 (36.0)	90.5 (32.5)	82.1 (27.8)	71.5 (21.9)	63.7 (17.6)	80.1 (26.7)
Daily mean °F (°C)	50.6 (10.3)	54.5 (12.5)	61.3 (16.3)	68.0 (20.0)	75.5 (24.2)	82.1 (27.8)	84.5 (29.2)	85.2 (29.6)	79.5 (26.4)	70.1 (21.2)	59.9 (15.5)	52.2 (11.2)	68.6 (20.3)
Mean daily minimum °F (°C)	38.9 (3.8)	42.4 (5.8)	49.5 (9.7)	56.3 (13.5)	64.9 (18.3)	71.7 (22.1)	73.4 (23.0)	73.7 (23.2)	68.5 (20.3)	58.1 (14.5)	48.3 (9.1)	40.8 (4.9)	57.2 (14.0)
Mean minimum °F (°C)	25.5 (−3.6)	29.0 (−1.7)	33.6 (0.9)	41.0 (5.0)	52.0 (11.1)	64.5 (18.1)	68.8 (20.4)	67.8 (19.9)	56.4 (13.6)	42.1 (5.6)	32.2 (0.1)	26.9 (−2.8)	23.0 (−5.0)
Record low °F (°C)	−2 (−19)	5 (−15)	17 (−8)	30 (−1)	40 (4)	51 (11)	56 (13)	50 (10)	39 (4)	27 (−3)	17 (−8)	4 (−16)	−2 (−19)
Average precipitation inches (mm)	2.41 (61)	1.73 (44)	2.76 (70)	3.20 (81)	4.53 (115)	3.57 (91)	2.21 (56)	2.60 (66)	4.03 (102)	4.41 (112)	2.69 (68)	2.41 (61)	36.55 (928)
Average snowfall inches (cm)	0.0 (0.0)	0.0 (0.0)	0.0 (0.0)	0.0 (0.0)	0.0 (0.0)	0.0 (0.0)	0.0 (0.0)	0.0 (0.0)	0.0 (0.0)	0.0 (0.0)	0.0 (0.0)	0.0 (0.0)	0.0 (0.0)
Average precipitation days (≥ 0.01 in)	7.1	7.4	8.1	6.5	8.0	6.3	5.2	4.8	7.2	6.0	6.1	7.6	80.3
Average snowy days (≥ 0.1 in)	0.0	0.1	0.0	0.0	0.0	0.0	0.0	0.0	0.0	0.0	0.0	0.0	0.1
Source: NOAA

== Government ==
In 2022, city voters approved the decriminalization of possession of misdemeanor amounts of marijuana.

== Education ==
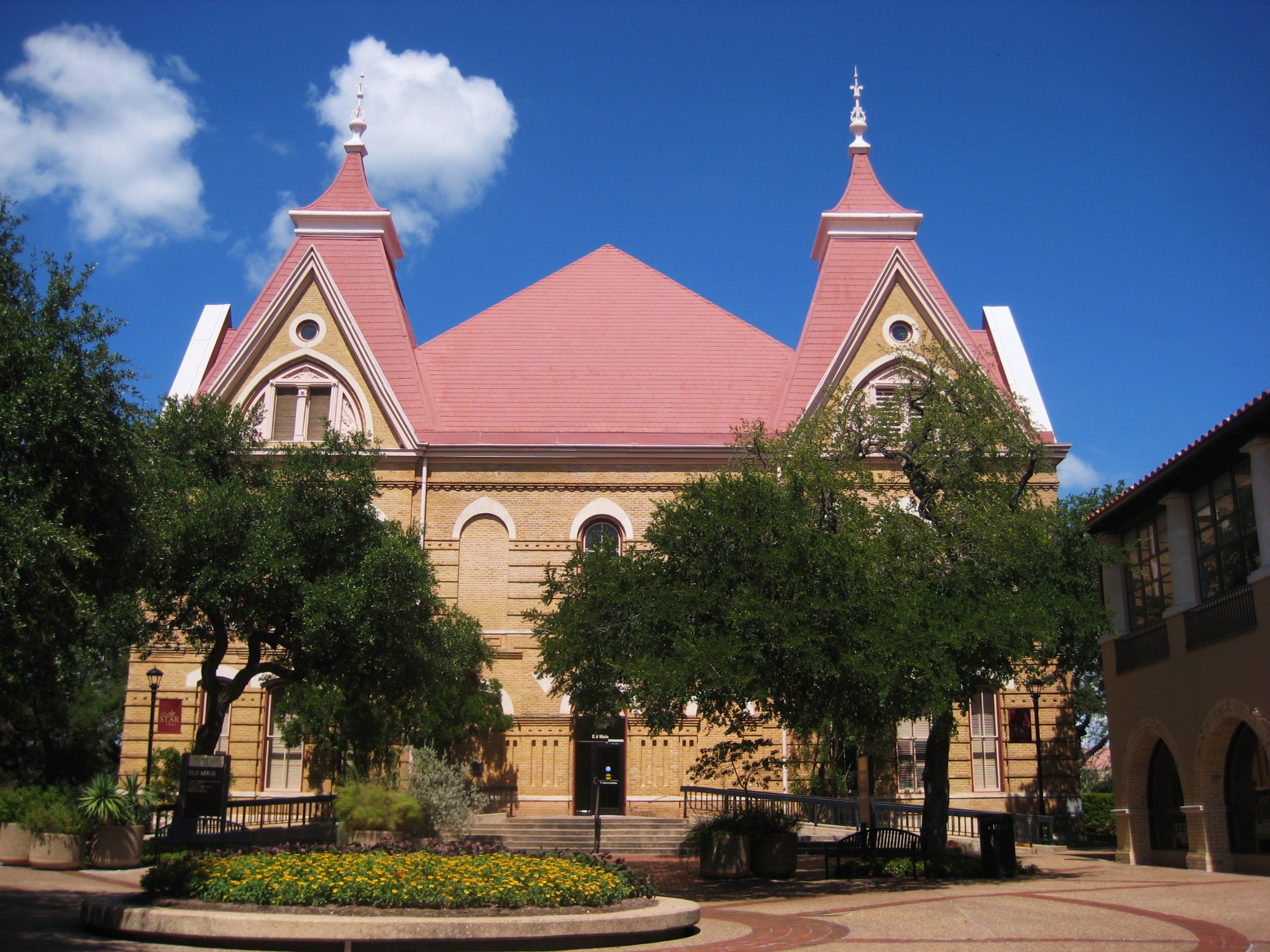
Old Main academic building at Texas State University

San Marcos is home to Texas State University, a multidisciplinary public research university that was established in 1899.

For primary and secondary education, San Marcos is served by the San Marcos Consolidated Independent School District. San Marcos High School is the district's sole high school. San Marcos Academy, a private high school, is in the city. Doris Miller Middle School and Owen Goodnight Middle School are the two middle schools located in San Marcos and is home to seven elementary schools: Rodriguez, Hernandez, Mendez, Crockett, Travis, Bowie, and DeZavala. The city also houses a prekindergarten school, named Bonham Pre-K.

San Marcos is also served by the Hays Consolidated Independent School District, in which Blanco Vista Elementary School is located within the San Marcos city limits in the extreme northeastern part of the city.

The Forensic Anthropology Center at Texas State is one of the four extant body farms in the United States and the largest such forensics research facility in the world.

San Marcos is also home to Aquarena Center, the Meadows Center for Water and the Environment, the San Marcos National Fish Hatchery and Aquatic Resource Center, the A. E. Wood Texas Fish Hatchery, the San Marcos Nature Center, the Centro Cultural Hispano de San Marcos, and the Indigenous Cultures Institute.

== Transportation ==
- Capital Area Rural Transportation System
- San Marcos Municipal Airport
- San Marcos Station is served by Amtrak's Texas Eagle

== Economy ==
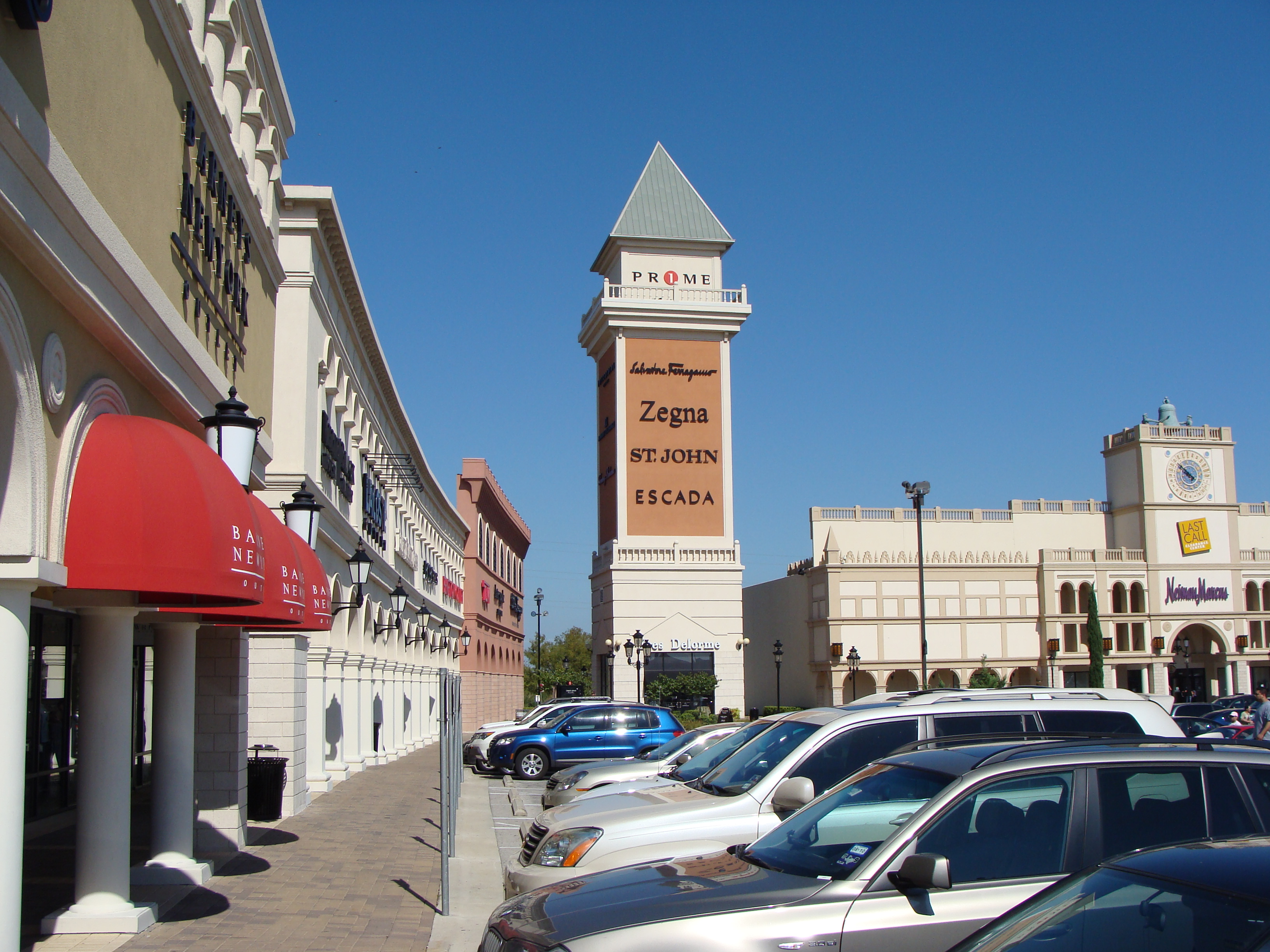
San Marcos Outlet Malls located to the east of Interstate 35

San Marcos' central location along I-35 and strong infrastructure make it conducive for industry. It includes business incentives, high quality of life, regional airports and proximity to major international airports, access to major roadways such as I-35, SH-130, US-183, and I-10, networking opportunities and support for small businesses and entrepreneurs, low tax structure, and a diverse workforce.

The top employers in 2021 are the following:

Rank	Employer	Employees
1	Amazon	5000
2	Texas State University	3730
3	San Marcos Premium Outlets	1600
4	Tanger Factory Outlets	1540
5	SMCISD	1400
6	Hays County	885
7	City of San Marcos	870
8	HEB Distribution Center	750
9	Central Texas Medical Center	675
10	CFAN	500

Along with its easy access to air travel, San Marcos has ready access to several freight routes and IH-35 and IH-10, which run north/south and east/west, respectively, through the region. The access points of the area provide an easy route to major cities in Texas such as Austin, San Antonio, Dallas, and Houston.

The region has several institutions of higher education that provide a continual source of talent for the region's workforce. These institutions include the fourth-largest university in the state, Texas State University, as well as Gary Job Corps, an education and career technical training program.

The area's quality of life is highlighted by the San Marcos River, which is naturally fed by the San Marcos Springs. Many other lakes and rivers dot the local landscape, and the region's location within the Texas Hill Country provides easy access to the many outdoor amenities. In June 2006, The View named the San Marcos Outlet Malls as the third-best place to shop in the world. About 14 million people visit them annually.

== Parks and recreation ==
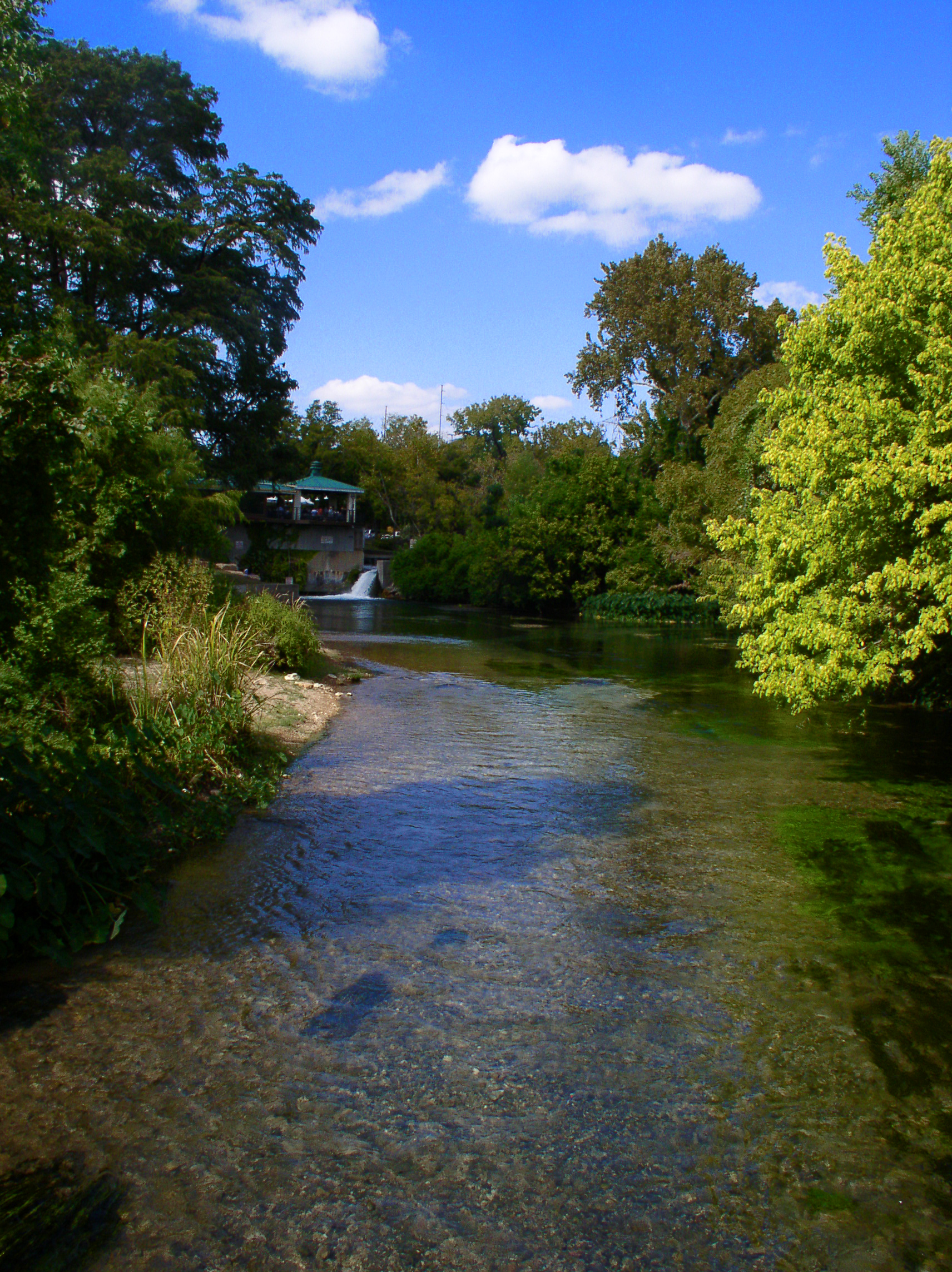
Downstream from the headwaters of the San Marcos Springs

The San Marcos and Blanco Rivers flow through the city, along with Cottonwood Creek, Purgatory Creek, Sink Creek, and Willow Springs Creek. Each of these rivers and creeks has parks or nature preserves with hiking trails along it.

The San Marcos River rises from the San Marcos Springs. The springs are home to several threatened or endangered species, including the Texas blind salamander, San Marcos salamander, fountain darter, San Marcos gambusia, and Texas wild rice. The river begins at San Marcos Springs, rising from the Edwards Aquifer into Spring Lake. The upper river flows through Texas State University and San Marcos and is a popular recreational area. It is joined by the Blanco River after four miles, passes through Luling and near Gonzales, and flows into the Guadalupe River after 75 miles (121 km). This course is the first leg of the Texas Water Safari, marketed as the "World's Toughest Canoe Race". San Marcos has many areas meant for recreation, but one of the most popular is Sewell Park. It is an open area along part of the San Marcos River. Because of its location on the Texas State University campus, the park is a popular spot for college students to swim, play, or just hang out. Many activities are available at Sewell Park, such as volleyball, picnics, and swimming/tubing. It is also known for being the spot where some newly graduated Texas State students jump into the San Marcos River after their graduation ceremony.

== Sports ==
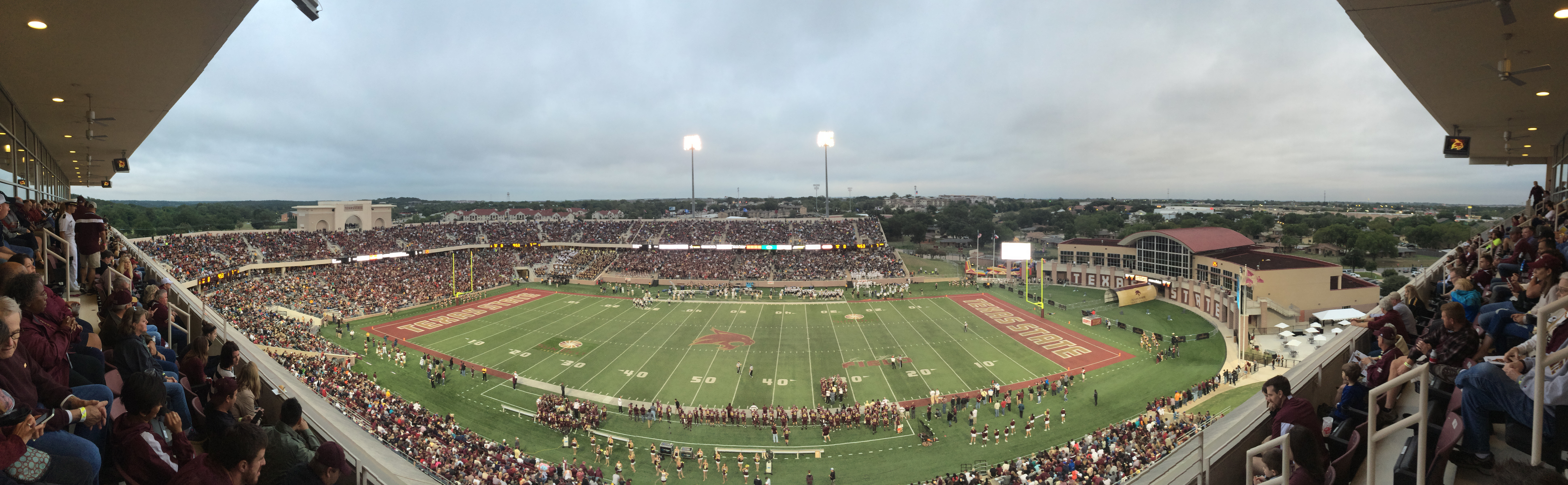
Texas State Bobcats vs Navy Midshipmen – September 13, 2014

Many residents of San Marcos support the athletic programs of Texas State University, known as the Texas State Bobcats. The football program won the NCAA Division II National Championships in 1982 and 1983 and now competes in the NCAA Division I (FBS) Pac-12 Conference. The Texas State Bobcats play home games in Bobcat Stadium, seating over 33,000 fans. Basketball and volleyball games are played at Strahan Arena. Baseball games are played at Bobcat Ballpark.

Amateur sports-car racing takes place at Harris Hill Raceway.

== Arts and culture ==
In 2010, San Marcos was listed in Business Week magazine's fourth annual survey of the "Best Places to Raise your Kids." In 2013 and 2014, the United States Census Bureau named it the fastest-growing city in the United States. In December 2013, it was named number 9 on the Business Insider list of the "10 Most Exciting Small Cities in America."

The river is a popular recreational area and is frequented by residents and tourists for tubing, canoeing, swimming, and fishing. The Texas Water Safari starts in San Marcos on the first Saturday in June each year. Due in part to its natural beauty, the city was nicknamed "San Marvelous". San Marcos references the nickname in its "Keep San Marcos Beautiful" campaign.

The town center (referred to locally as "the square") was laid out in 1851 and is listed in the National Register of Historic Places. The Hays County Courthouse, which sits in the center, was built in 1908. The downtown area surrounding the courthouse is home to many of the city's bars, restaurants, boutiques, and music venues, making it a top entertainment destination. The Marc, directly across the street from the courthouse, hosted the 2011, 2012, and 2013 Lone Star Music Awards.

In addition to the historic downtown, San Marcos has five residential historic districts. It also boasts of at least 40 homes and buildings on the National Register of Historic Places.

Local media include the San Marcos Daily Record and The University Star.

=== Public art ===
The City of San Marcos and the San Marcos Arts Commission in collaboration with a committee of citizens from the community and Texas State University broke ground in January 2013 on a commemorative sculpture intended to sit at the intersection of LBJ Drive and MLK Drive. Designed by Aaron P. Hussey of Baton Rouge, it depicts Johnson and King conversing in the Oval Office. It was officially unveiled on Martin Luther King Jr. Day in 2014.

The Walkers' Gallery: In July 1997, the City of San Marcos Department of Parks and Recreation opened the San Marcos Activity Center. Along with the recreational facilities and meeting rooms, this new building debuted an extensive community art gallery. The gallery is directed and curated by the San Marcos Area Arts Council, a nonprofit organization, and is sustained through grants from the San Marcos Arts Commission. Named the Walkers' Gallery because of its placement in the walking corridors of the building, it displays seven diverse exhibits a year, primarily of art by area artists and occasional invitational exhibits. The public can enter the Activity Center to see the exhibits and attend art receptions at no charge. Artists of all ages and levels may submit their work that can be simply displayed or be for sale.

The downtown area has become home to several graffiti-style murals, including designs depicting Jeff Bridges' character the Dude from The Big Lebowski.

In 2016, the San Marcos Arts Commission erected 10 mermaid statues throughout the city. Mermaids have been part of San Marcos culture since the mid-1900s, when the former Aquarena Springs began underwater performances by women dressed as mermaids. Each mermaid statue is 7 ft tall and mounted on a limestone slab to make the final height closer 9 ft. Each mermaid is decorated by a different regional artist, and celebrates the art, culture, and natural beauty of the city.

=== Music ===
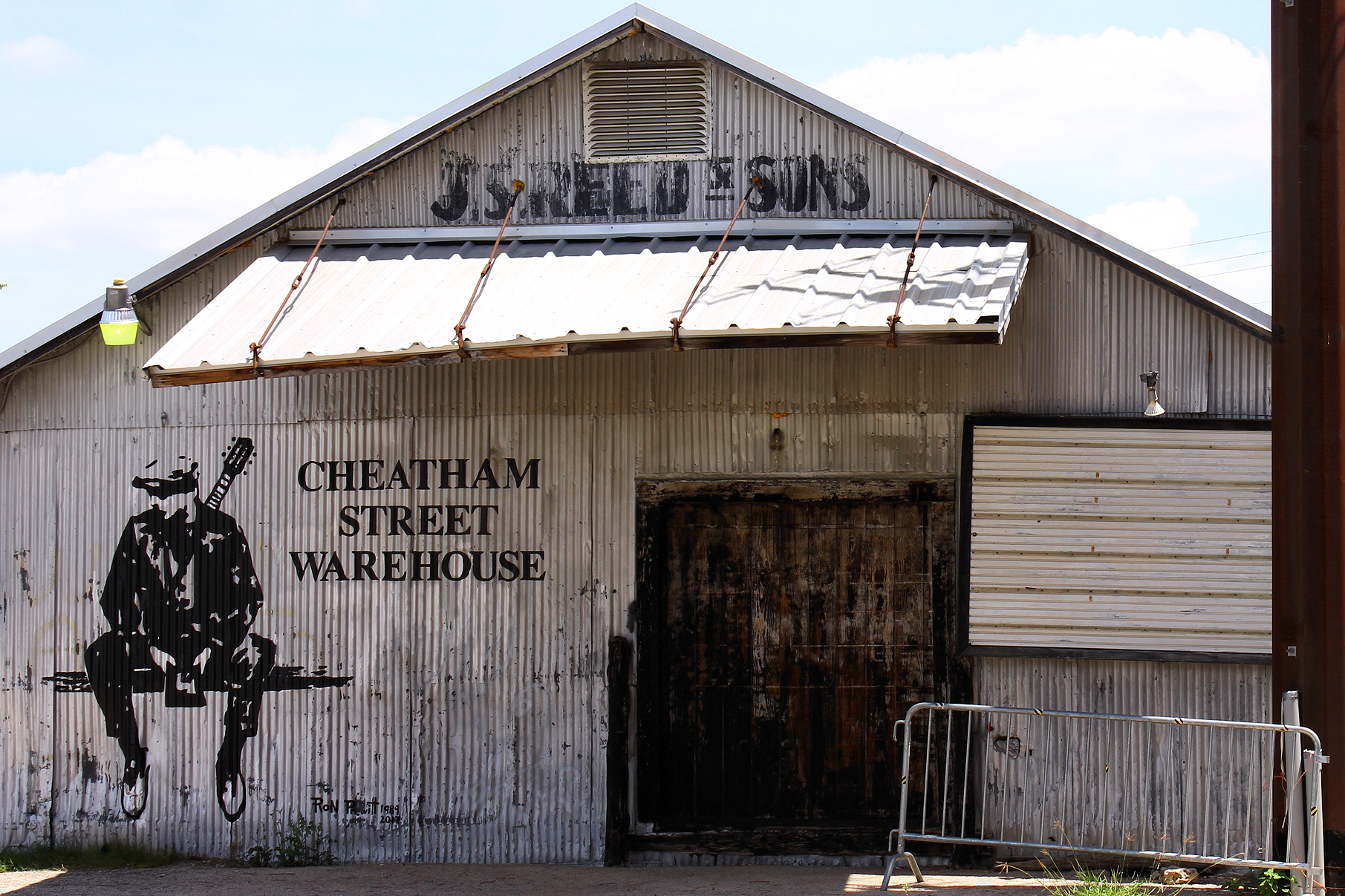
The west entrance of the Cheatham Street Warehouse

For more than 20 years, as of 2008, the San Marcos Performing Arts Commission and the San Marcos Parks and Recreation Department have hosted the Summer in the Park concert series with live music at an outdoor venue every Thursday night from June to August.

The Cheatham Street Warehouse helped launch the careers of George Strait, Stevie Ray Vaughan, Randy Rogers, Todd Snider, James McMurtry, and Terri Hendrix, among others. The Cheatham Street Foundation continues work to preserve Texas music traditions and has offered seminars on the business end of the music business.

Contributing to the music scene in San Marcos, Texas State University hosts the Hill Country Jazz Festival and Eddie Durham Celebration annually.

=== Film ===
Many television shows and movies have filmed in San Marcos, including Friday Night Lights, D.O.A., Everybody Wants Some!!, Boyhood, American Crime, That's What I'm Talking About, Piranha, The Ringer, Courage Under Fire, The New Guy, The Faculty, Idiocracy, The Getaway, The War at Home, Little Boy Blue, Flesh and Bone, Race With the Devil, and The Tree of Life.

The San Marcos Cinema Club hosts the Lost River Film Festival, which is named for the fictional Lost River in the film Piranha, which was filmed on the San Marcos River.

== Places of interest ==
- Alkek Library
- Bobcat Ballpark
- Bobcat Stadium
- Calaboose African American History Museum
- Cheatham Street Warehouse
- Centro Cultural Hispano de San Marcos
- Eye of the Dog Art Center
- First United Methodist Church
- Fort Street Presbyterian Church
- Freeman Ranch
- Lyndon Baines Johnson Museum of San Marcos
- Meadows Center for Water and the Environment
- Old Main
- Rio Vista Dam
- San Marcos Mill Tract
- San Marcos Outlet Malls
- Texas State University
- Sewell Park
- Strahan Coliseum
- Wonder Cave

== Sister cities ==
- Mexico Monclova, Coahuila
- Mexico Santiago, Nuevo León
