= Cambria Cavern =

Closed cave in Texas

- Location within Texas Location within the United States
- Location: Round Rock, Texas
- Coordinates: 30°29′21.5304″N 97°44′38.7672″W
- Depth: 5 feet (1.5 m)
- Length: 230 feet (70 m)
- Height variation: 23 feet (7.0 m)
- Discovery: 2018
- Geology: Limestone
- Access: Closed (2018)

Cambria Cavern was a small limestone solutional cave which was discovered on 8 February 2018 when a portion of the cave's roof collapsed, causing sinkhole opened up in a residential area in Round Rock, Texas. To stabilize the road and utility lines above the cave, the cave was partially filled with concrete and sealed.

== Description ==
The cave is one of an estimated 3,000 under the extensive karst landscape of the Edwards Plateau, formed by the dissolution of Edwards Group limestone by rainwater. The cave, which is an estimated 40 million years old, was the second discovered in the immediate residential area: during construction of the area in 1986, a separate cave was found and dynamited by housing developers.

Upon discovery, the shallow cave, which in some areas was only five feet below the surface, was mapped to be approximately 230 feet (70 m) long and 40 feet (12 m) wide. The cave consisted of five chambers, which were extensively decorated with speleothems, most notably a massive flowstone column in the main chamber. The chambers varied in dimension, with the main chamber being 23 feet (7.0 m) tall and the fourth chamber only 3 feet (0.91 m) tall. The cave had no natural entrances prior to the 2018 collapse.

== Collapse and filling ==
On the morning of 8 February 2018, a portion of the undiscovered cave's roof collapsed under Cambria Drive in a Round Rock residential neighborhood. The sound of the collapse was likened to an explosion. When work crews and geologists arrived at the cave, more parts of the roadway started collapsing leading to the county enlarging the collapse to allow safe entrance of the cave. Security was heightened when there was a reported trespasses into the cave in April 2018.

After an environmental assessment conducted by the Texas Commission on Environmental Quality, the county decided to partially fill the cave with concrete to repair the road and ensure the safety of residences above the cave. Before the cave was filled, 3D maps of the cave were produced to preserve imagery of the cave and assist in plans to fill the cave. On 1 August 2018, while filling the cave, work crews discovered a new chamber, bringing the total number of chambers to five. The filling, which used poured concrete in conjunction with a geogrid and wires for support, was concluded on 31 August 2018. In September 2018, while rebuilding utilities, workers discovered a small void thought to be connected to the cave, and the feature was plugged.
