= Rock Dove Cave =

Large cave in San Antonio, Texas, United States

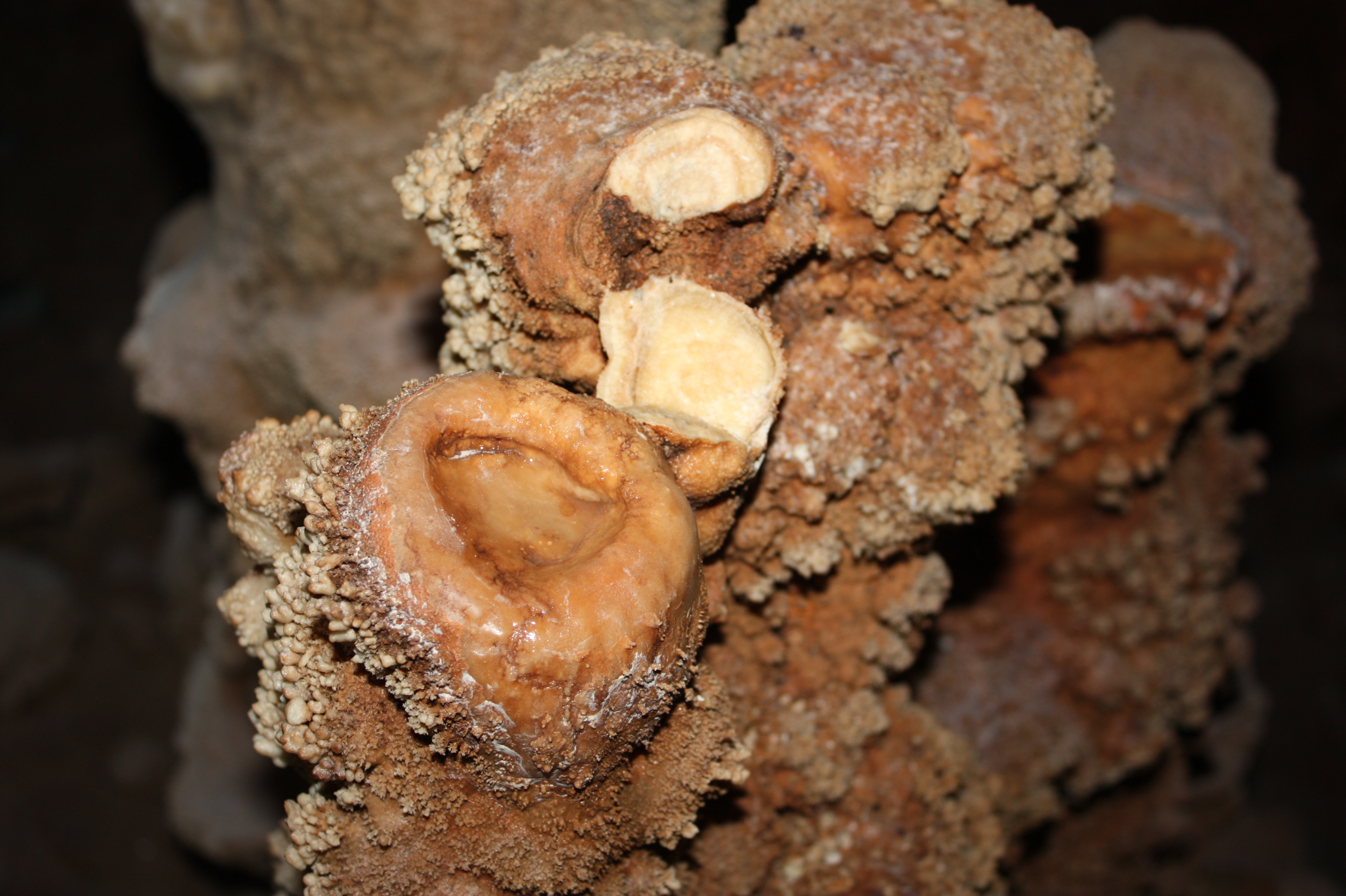
- Rock Dove Cave - formation

- Location within Texas
- Location: San Antonio, Texas, United States
- Coordinates: 29°41′13.86″N 98°28′05.54″W
- Discovery: January 2013
- Access: Private

Rock Dove Cave is a cave in San Antonio, Texas, United States discovered by local boys who were exploring a construction site owned by McMillin Homes. The cave is believed to be the fifth largest in Bexar County.

== History ==
The sprawling cave was found in January 2013 by two boys, Ethan and Brendon, who were exploring near the Ridge at Lookout Canyon, on land being developed for residential homes. The developer, McMillin Homes, notified The Texas Commission on Environmental Quality (TCEQ) of the cave on January 31, 2013.

McMillin Homes placed grates over several of the entrances and sealed a larger access. According to some residents in the area, potential homeowners in the development are not being told that the cave exists under their home sites, however, McMillan home has stated that the existence of the cave and the engineers' assessments will be disclosed to prospective homeowners. The cave is believed by experts to be the fifth largest cave in Bexar County.

The developer of the neighborhood wishes to seal of the cave with concrete and to redesign then subdivision, so no house will be built atop it. He plans on doing this, not only to preserve the cave, but also to finish his neighborhood. The cave has been seriously damaged after the deep rock trenching by the developer, inadequate protection from the elements and local, amateur spelunkers that explored the system. The developer and explorers have broken soda straws, stalagmites, and stalactites. Geologists are seriously concerned with the future of this cave, as it is in danger of further harm. Scientists wish to study the cave as it may hold secrets of the Edwards Aquifer, endangered species, and important information about the regions geology.

== Gallery ==
Rock formations in Rock Dove Cave
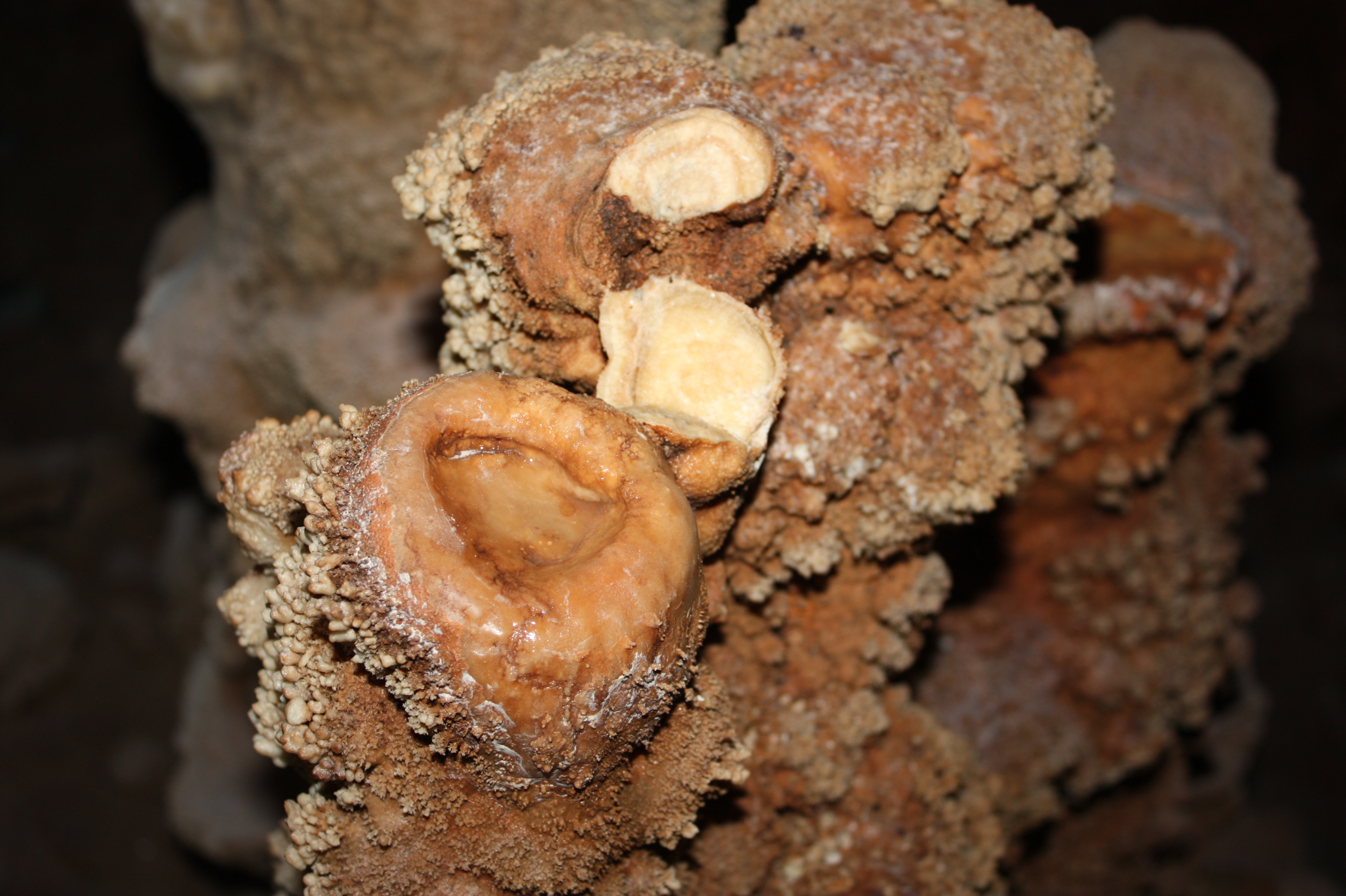
Rock formation

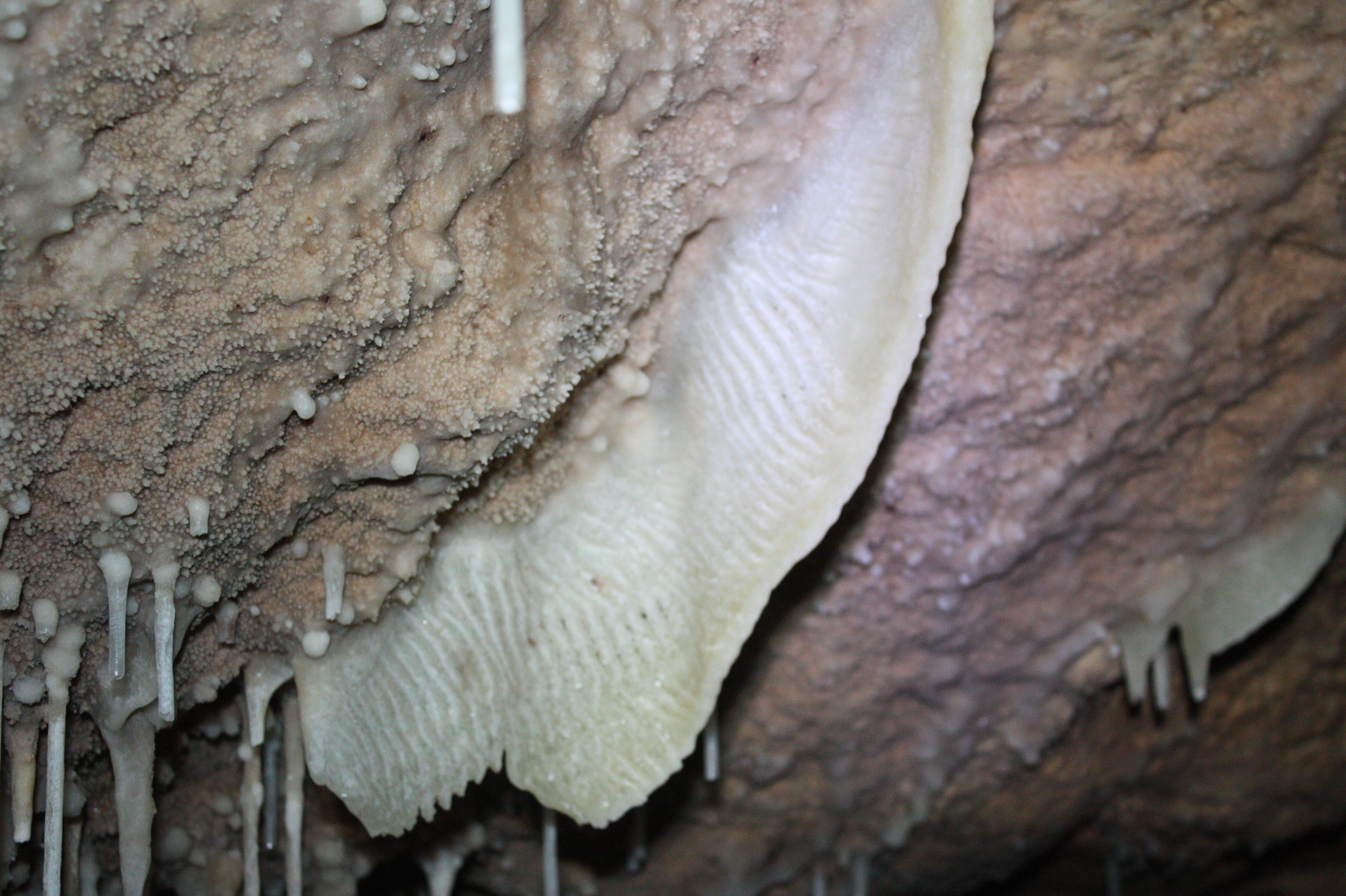
Rock formation

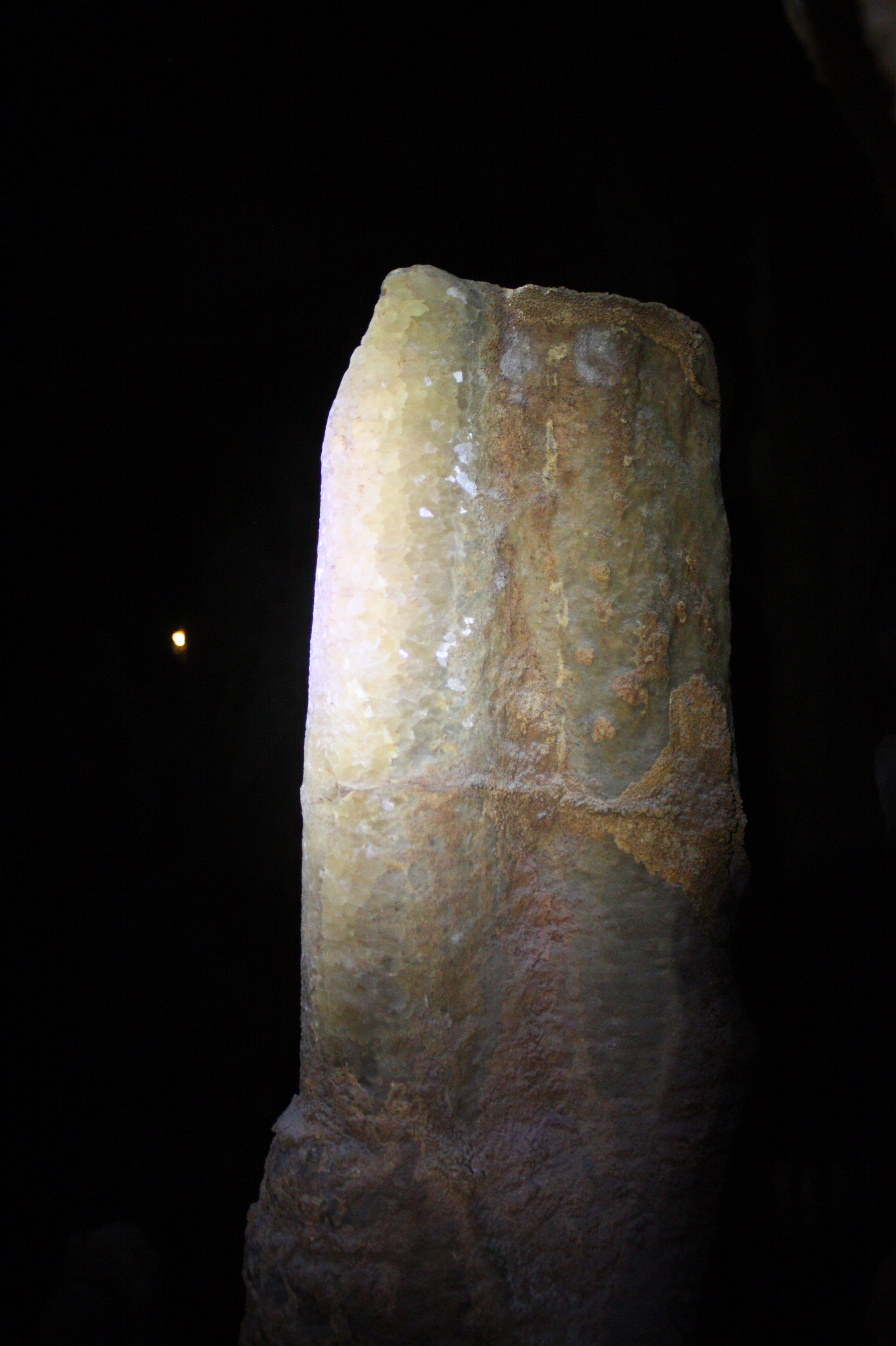
Rock formation

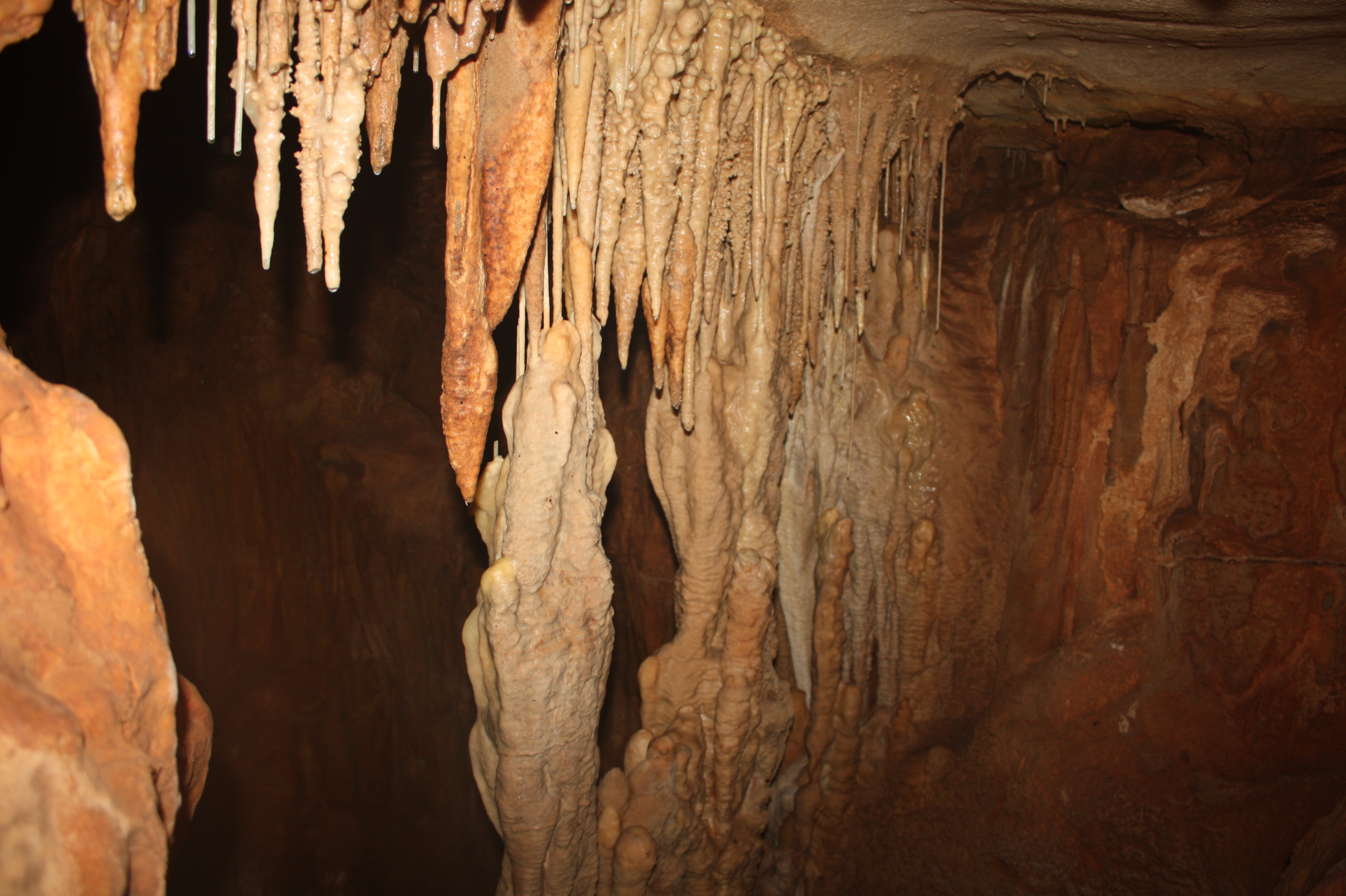
Rock formation
