= List of amphibians of North Carolina =

This is a list of amphibian species and subspecies found in North Carolina, based mainly on checklists from the North Carolina Museum of Natural Sciences. Common and scientific names are according to the Society for the Study of Amphibians and Reptiles publications.

== Salamanders ==
Order: Caudata

Family: Sirenidae
- Eastern lesser siren Siren intermedia intermedia
- Greater siren Siren lacertina
Family: Cryptobranchidae
- Eastern hellbender Cryptobranchus alleganiensis alleganiensis
Family: Proteidae
- Neuse River waterdog Necturus lewisi
- Common mudpuppy Necturus maculosus maculosus
- Dwarf waterdog Necturus punctatus
Family: Amphiumidae
- Two-toed amphiuma Amphiuma means
Family: Ambystomatidae
- Mabee's salamander Ambystoma mabeei
- Spotted salamander Ambystoma maculatum
- Marbled salamander Ambystoma opacum
- Mole salamander Ambystoma talpoideum
- Eastern tiger salamander Ambystoma tigrinum
Family: Salamandridae
- Red-spotted newt Notophthalmus viridescens viridescens
- Broken-striped newt Notophthalmus viridescens dorsalis
Family: Plethodontidae
- Green salamander Aneides aeneus
- Seepage salamander Desmognathus aeneus
- Holbrook's southern dusky salamander Desmognathus auriculatus
- Carolina mountain dusky salamander Desmognathus carolinensis
- Spotted dusky salamander Desmognathus conanti
- Dwarf black-bellied salamander Desmognathus folkertsi
- Northern dusky salamander Desmognathus fuscus
- Imitator salamander Desmognathus imitator
- Shovel-nosed salamander Desmognathus marmoratus
- Seal salamander Desmognathus monticola
- Ocoee salamander Desmognathus ocoee
- Blue Ridge dusky salamander Desmognathus orestes
- Northern pygmy salamander Desmognathus organi
- Black-bellied salamander Desmognathus quadramaculatus
- Santeetlah dusky salamander Desmognathus santeetlah
- Pygmy salamander Desmognathus wrighti
- Chamberlain's dwarf salamander Eurycea chamberlaini
- Southern two-lined salamander Eurycea cirrigera
- Three-lined salamander Eurycea guttolineata
- Junaluska salamander Eurycea junaluska
- Long-tailed salamander Eurycea longicauda
- Southeastern dwarf salamander Eurycea quadridigitata
- Blue Ridge two-lined salamander Eurycea wilderae
- Blue Ridge spring salamander Gyrinophilus porphyriticus danielsi
- Carolina spring salamander Gyrinophilus porphyriticus dunni
- Northern spring salamander Gyrinophilus porphyriticus porphyriticus
- Four-toed salamander Hemidactylium scutatum
- Blue Ridge gray-cheeked salamander Plethodon amplus
- Tellico salamander Plethodon aureolus
- Chattahoochee slimy salamander Plethodon chattahoochee
- Cheoah Bald salamander Plethodon cheoah
- Atlantic Coast slimy salamander Plethodon chlorobryonis
- Eastern red-backed salamander Plethodon cinereus
- White-spotted slimy salamander Plethodon cylindraceus
- Northern slimy salamander Plethodon glutinosus
- Red-cheeked salamander Plethodon jordani
- South Mountain gray-cheeked salamander Plethodon meridianus
- Southern gray-cheeked salamander Plethodon metcalfi
- Northern gray-cheeked salamander Plethodon montanus
- Southern ravine salamander Plethodon richmondi
- Southern red-backed salamander Plethodon serratus
- Red-legged salamander Plethodon shermani
- Southern Appalachian salamander Plethodon teyahalee
- Southern zigzag salamander Plethodon ventralis
- Wehrle's salamander Plethodon wehrlei
- Weller's salamander Plethodon welleri
- Yonahlossee salamander Plethodon yonahlossee
- Mud salamander Pseudotriton montanus
- Blue Ridge red salamander Pseudotriton ruber nitidus
- Northern red salamander Pseudotriton ruber ruber
- Black-chinned red salamander Pseudotriton ruber schencki
- Many-lined salamander Stereochilus marginatus

== Frogs ==
Order: Anura

Family: Scaphiopodidae
- Eastern spadefoot Scaphiopus holbrookii
Family: Bufonidae
- Eastern American toad Anaxyrus americanus americanus
- Fowler's toad Anaxyrus fowleri
- Oak toad Anaxyrus quercicus
- Southern toad Anaxyrus terrestris
Family: Hylidae
- Eastern cricket frog Acris crepitans
- Southern cricket frog Acris gryllus
- Pine Barrens treefrog Hyla andersonii
- Cope's gray treefrog Hyla chrysoscelis
- Green treefrog Hyla cinerea
- Pine woods treefrog Hyla femoralis
- Barking treefrog Hyla gratiosa
- Squirrel treefrog Hyla squirella
- Gray treefrog Hyla versicolor
- Mountain chorus frog Pseudacris brachyphona
- Brimley's chorus frog Pseudacris brimleyi
- Spring peeper Pseudacris crucifer
- Upland chorus frog Pseudacris feriarum
- Southern chorus frog Pseudacris nigrita
- Little grass frog Pseudacris ocularis
- Ornate chorus frog Pseudacris ornata
Family: Microhylidae
- Eastern narrow-mouthed toad Gastrophryne carolinensis
Family: Ranidae
- Gopher frog Lithobates capito
- American bullfrog Lithobates catesbeianus
- Green frog Lithobates clamitans
- River frog Lithobates heckscheri
- Pickerel frog Lithobates palustris
- Southern leopard frog Lithobates sphenocephalus
- Wood frog Lithobates sylvaticus
- Carpenter frog Lithobates virgatipes
