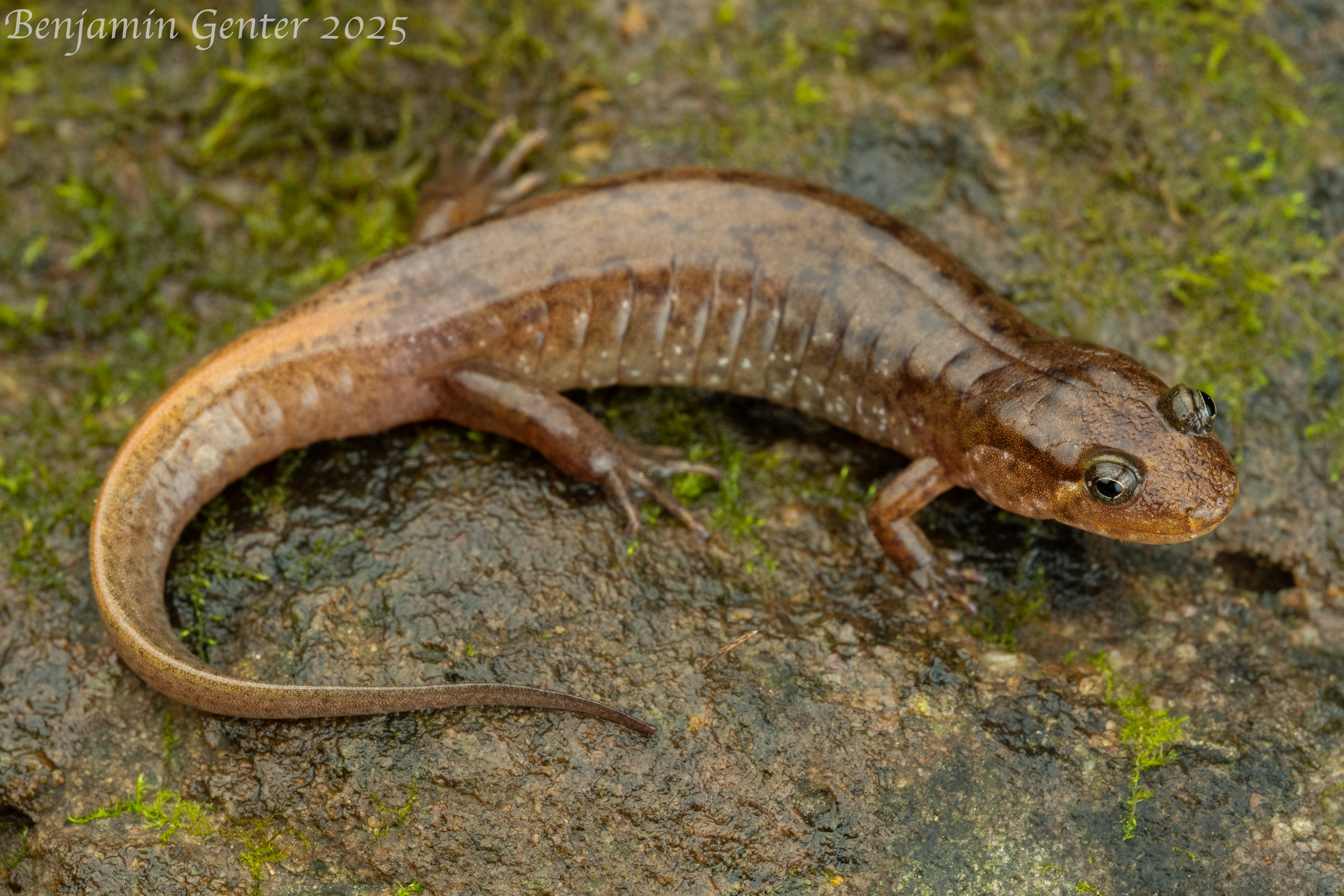

Scientific classification
- Kingdom: Animalia
- Phylum: Chordata
- Class: Amphibia
- Order: Urodela
- Family: Plethodontidae
- Genus: Desmognathus
- Species: D. cheaha

Binomial name
- Desmognathus cheaha Pyron and Beamer, 2023

= Talladega seal salamander =

Species of amphibians

The Talladega seal salamander (Desmognathus cheaha) is a mid-sized stream-dwelling plethodontid salamander native to the Southeastern United States. This species was split from the common seal salamander (Desmognathus monticola) in 2022.

== Distribution and habitat ==
The Talladega seal salamander can be found in the U.S. States of Georgia, Alabama, and Florida. This species occurs in the Ridge & Valley, Piedmont, and Coastal/Southeastern Plains physiographic provinces, in contrast with Desmognathus monticola, which predominantly occurs in the Appalachian highlands. The only known population in Florida is believed to have undergone a dramatic population decline, and may be extirpated, after nearby logging activities impacted stream habitat.

The Talladega seal salamander occurs in streams throughout its range. Populations in the Coastal Plain appear to be restricted to high-gradient streams and microhabitats in contact with rock and flowing water.
