= Nantahala black-bellied salamander =

Scientific classification
- Kingdom: Animalia
- Phylum: Chordata
- Class: Amphibia
- Order: Urodela
- Family: Plethodontidae
- Genus: Desmognathus
- Species: D. amphileucus

Binomial name
- Desmognathus amphileucus Bishop, 1941

Synonyms
- D. quadramaculatus amphileucus Bishop, 1941

Species of amphibian

== General ==
The Nantahala black-bellied salamander or southern black-bellied salamander (Desmognathus amphileucus) is a species of lungless salamander in the family Plethodontidae. It is endemic to the eastern United States, where it is only known from the southern Appalachian Mountains.

Initially described in 1941 as a subspecies of the blackbelly salamander ("D. quadramaculatus"), a 2022 study found significant genetic divergence within the species, but also found that the name D. quadramaculatus had in fact been coined for the northern dusky salamander rather than the blackbelly salamander. D. amphileucus, already having previously received a name, was uplifted as a distinct species.

== Morphology ==
Desmognathus amphileucus is a medium-sized salamander that can grow up to 18 centimeters.

== Distribution ==
It is known from southwestern North Carolina, extreme western South Carolina, extreme southeastern Tennessee, and northeastern Georgia. It is restricted to the Blue Ridge Mountains subrange, with its range being roughly bordered by the Great Smoky Mountains to the north and the French Broad River to the east. Isolated populations are known from the Piedmont of Georgia and South Carolina that may have resulted from introductions via fishing bait buckets.

== Behavior ==
The southern black-bellied salamander are mostly nocturnal but they will stay in a semi-active state under a cover object during the day. They will also avoid light.

== Predators ==
Larval salamanders are predated on by fish and larger salamanders/larvae.
