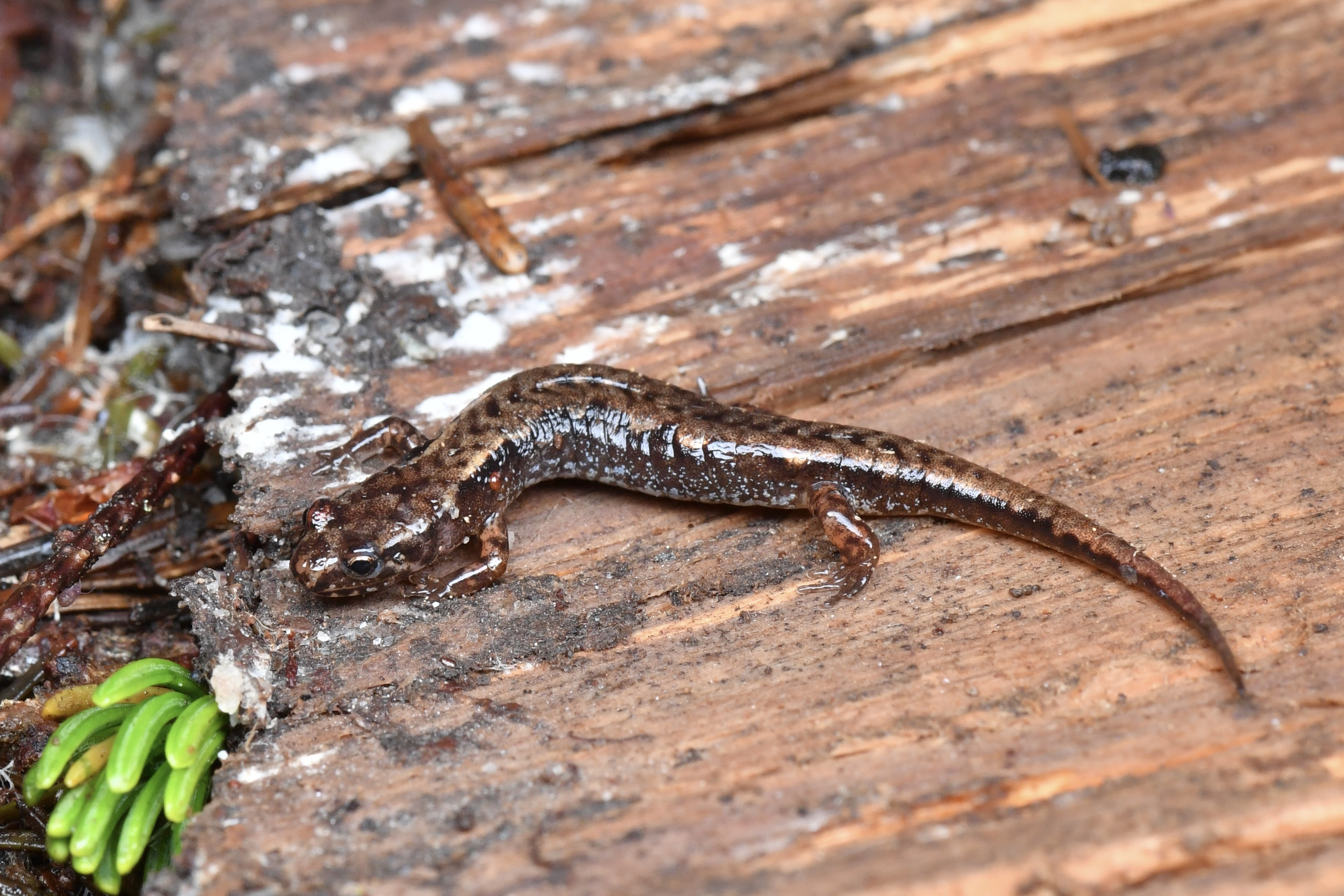

Conservation status
- Vulnerable (NatureServe)

Scientific classification
- Kingdom: Animalia
- Phylum: Chordata
- Class: Amphibia
- Order: Urodela
- Family: Plethodontidae
- Genus: Desmognathus
- Species: D. organi

Binomial name
- Desmognathus organi Crespi, Browne, and Rissler, 2010

= Northern pygmy salamander =

Species of amphibian

The northern pygmy salamander (Desmognathus organi) is a terrestrial species of salamander in the family Plethodontidae and genus Desmognathus. Along with the southern pygmy (D. wrighti) and the seepage salamander (D. aeneus), these are some of the smallest salamander species in North America and can be found in higher elevations in the southern Appalachians.

== Description ==
Desmognathus organi can be identified by its small size, averaging only 40–60 mm total length, and its distinct herringbone pattern on the dorsal side and copper colored eyelids, which are traits only shared with D. wrighti. Dorsal coloration can vary from dark reddish-brown to light brown, with a much lighter ventral surface. Characteristic of the Desmognathus species, there is a light colored eye stripe to the jaw, and the hindlimbs are longer and more robust than the forelimbs. However, unlike most of the other Desmognathus species, the tail is round in cross section and is also less than half of the total length of the salamander, this seems to be characteristic of these smaller species, including the southern pygmy (D. wrighti) and seepage salamander (D. aeneus). In contrast to D. wrighti, D. organi salamanders are generally slightly larger in size, with the maximum total length of adult D. wrighti being 50 mm whereas most adult D. organi exceed 50 mm. They also have wider heads than D. wrighti, and D. organi females tend to be larger than males. This sexual dimorphism is absent in D. wrighti.

== Geographic distribution ==
Populations of Desmognathus organi can be found in high elevation spruce-fir and hardwood forest habitats in the Blue Ridge Mountains. It is rare to find this species below 1500m. It is thought that historically the distribution of spruce-fir forests and subsequent populations of pygmy salamanders may have been continuous at one point, but as the climate became warmer and drier populations became isolated on the high elevation "islands" that we see today. This species occurs north and east of the French Broad river, ranging from the southwesternmost part of Virginia, particularly Mount Rogers and Whitetop Mountain, to the ridges of western North Carolina and eastern Tennessee. Its sister species, D. wrighti, occurs at similar elevations and habitats south and west of the French Broad to the Georgia state line.

== Life history ==
Desmognathus organi undergoes direct development to bypass the aquatic larval stage. This is a unique trait of D. organi and the other small Desmognathus species D. wrighti and D. aeneus, allowing them to be the most terrestrial species of the genus. Most Desmognathus species rely on a water source to lay their eggs and mature in the water for the first stage of their lives, but by hatching as small adult salamanders, D. organi can survive in wooded areas away from streams. D. organi have been reported climbing trees as high as 2 meters off the ground, and this is believed to be a method for catching prey or escaping predation. Males reach reproductive maturity by 3.5 yrs old, and females mature by 4.5. Mating occurs in fall and spring, and involves the males biting on to the female's tail to initiate the mating process. In a typical Plethodontidae mating behaviour, the pair will then walk in a line with the female straddling the male's tail and the male will then deposit a spermatophore on the ground and guide the female to it so she may pick it up with her cloaca. This is how they achieve internal fertilization, and the female will lay a clutch averaging 3-10 eggs in a seepage area or wherever she can find moist ground and stay nearby to protect them. Finding a moist place to lay the eggs is only necessary so the eggs do not dry out, as once the eggs hatch the hatchlings will not live in water. D. organi can be found mostly on the forest floor under moss, leaf litter, fallen logs, or small stones. It has been observed that they seem to prefer smaller covers of woody debris rather larger covers, such as big rocks. D. organi will overwinter in clusters underground in seepage areas, often communally. In 1959, James Organ uncovered as many as 649 individuals from a single nesting/hibernating site in a seep. During spring through fall, D. organi will be mostly active at night and when it rains, and will hunt small invertebrates such as mites, moths, small beetles, and spiders. Predators of D. organi may include the spring salamander (Gyrinophilus porphyriticus), larger Desmognathus species such as the blackbellied salamander (D. quadromaculatus), small snakes like the ringneck (Diadophis punctatus), carabid beetles, and birds.

== Conservation status ==
Currently, Desmognathus organi has not been assessed by the IUCN, but Desmognathus wrighti (which previously encompassed Northern and Southern pygmy populations) has been classified as Least Concern nationally, but was deemed in need of management in Tennessee in 2011. Further assessment of the species is still needed. The species could face habitat loss due to logging, increased recreation in the Pisgah and Cherokee National Forests, and habitat alteration resulting from climate change and acid rain in some areas.
