= Kanawha black-bellied salamander =

Scientific classification
- Kingdom: Animalia
- Phylum: Chordata
- Class: Amphibia
- Order: Urodela
- Family: Plethodontidae
- Genus: Desmognathus
- Species: D. kanawha

Binomial name
- Desmognathus kanawha Pyron and Beamer, 2022

Species of amphibian

The Kanawha black-bellied salamander or New River black-bellied salamander (Desmognathus kanawha) is a species of lungless salamander in the family Plethodontidae. It is endemic to the eastern United States, where it is only known from the south-central Appalachian Mountains.

The northernmost member of the "blackbelly salamander" complex, it is primarily known from the Kanawha River basin of southwestern Virginia and southern West Virginia, but is also known from the upper Pee Dee River basin of northwestern North Carolina and southwestern Virginia, the upper Tennessee River basin of southwestern Virginia and northeastern Tennessee, the Roanoke River basin of north-central North Carolina and south-central Virginia, and the lower Chesapeake River basin of west-central Virginia. It is currently unknown how far southwest and northeast this species ranges.

Initially grouped with the blackbelly salamander (D. quadramaculatus), a 2022 study found significant genetic divergence within the species, but also found that the name D. quadramaculatus had in fact been coined for the northern dusky salamander rather than the blackbelly salamander. The northern population was thus described as a distinct species, D. kanawha, after the Kanawha basin.
