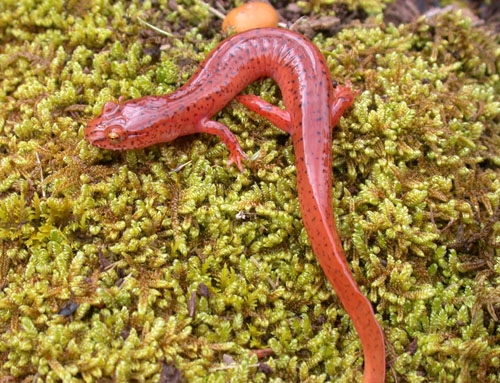

Conservation status
- Least Concern (IUCN 3.1)

- Secure (NatureServe)

Scientific classification
- Kingdom: Animalia
- Phylum: Chordata
- Class: Amphibia
- Order: Urodela
- Family: Plethodontidae
- Genus: Gyrinophilus
- Species: G. porphyriticus

Binomial name
- Gyrinophilus porphyriticus (Green, 1827)
- Range of Gyrinophilus porphyriticus subspecies: Brown: G. p. porphyriticus Black: G. p. duryi Magenta: G. p. danielsi Purple: G. p. dunni

Synonyms
- Salamandra porphyritica Green, 1827

= Spring salamander =

Species of amphibian

The spring salamander (Gyrinophilus porphyriticus) is a species of salamander in the family Plethodontidae (lungless salamanders). It is found in Canada and the United States. The genus, Gyrinophilus, means "tadpole lover" and refers to the long period of time it spends as a gilled larva before maturing. The specific epithet, porphyriticus, is Latin from Greek, meaning the color of porphyry, a purple stone, and this salamander has also been called the purple salamander.

Its natural habitats are temperate forests, rivers, swamps, freshwater marshes, freshwater springs, inland karsts, and caves. In addition to insects, spiders, mites, millipedes, centipedes, slugs, snails, annelid worms, and other small invertebrates, the fairly large spring salamander may also consume smaller stream dwelling salamanders and their eggs, such as two-lined and dusky salamanders, as well as pygmy, ocoee, Jordan's, southern red-backed, southern Appalachian, and red salamanders. They are also known to be cannibalistic. They are considered salamander specialists in some areas, such as the mountains of North Carolina, where between 40 and 50% of their adult diets may consist of other salamanders.

Although deforestation is a potential threat, the spring salamander occurs in many protected areas and is not listed as threatened in the IUCN Red List.

== Description ==
Like all members of the family Plethodontidae these salamanders have a nasolabial groove. The subspecies G. p. porphyriticus and G. p. duryi can be 4.75–7.5 in (12.1–19.1 cm) long. The record length is 9.125 in (23.18 cm). The light line from eye to nostril is bordered below by gray pigment, but the markings are not always conspicuous. The dorsal coloration varies from salmon or light brownish to pink or reddish. The ground color has a cloudy appearance, and the darker markings are vague. The subspecies G. p. danielsi and G. p. dunni can be 5–7.5 in (13–19 cm). The record length is 8.06 in (20.5 cm). Adults reach larger sizes at higher elevations as a consequence of delay in development to maturity after metamorphosis in high-level populations. The white line from eye to nostril, bordered below by a conspicuous black or dark brown line, is distinctive. There also may be a dark line above the white line, often conspicuous. The dorsal coloration can be clear reddish, salmon, or orange-yellow marked with black or brown spots or flecks. 17 to 19 costal grooves. Larvae are aquatic and have stream-type morphology. Juveniles are typically more brightly colored than adults.

== Habitat ==
This species is found in cool springs and mountain springs, but is also likely to be found in any wet depression beneath logs, stones, or leaves in the surrounding forest. They require being in areas that provide them with adequate oxygen and moisture because they conduct cutaneous respiration. During the colder months of the year, the salamanders will spend their time in wet soil close to a source of water where they remain somewhat active in burrows, or in the leaf litter near a stream or other body of water.

== Geographic range ==
Its distribution ranges from southern Quebec to northern Alabama and extremely northeast Mississippi. There is also an isolated colony in Hamilton County, Ohio. G. p. duryi is present in southern Ohio, eastern Kentucky, West Virginia, and western Virginia. The distribution range of G. p. danielsi is the southern Appalachian Mountains and the adjacent Piedmont from North Carolina to Alabama. G. p. dunni is distributed through the southern portion of the Blue Ridge Province and the Piedmont from southwest North Carolina to eastern to central Alabama. The nominate subspecies, G. p. porphyriticus, occupies the remainder of the geographical range of this species.

== Reproduction ==
Spring Salamanders commonly breed in late summer into fall. The courtship begins with the male sliding his head over the female's body. From there, a tail-straddle walk begins. This walk entails the female straddling the male's tail while both walk forward. From there, the male deposits the spermatophore on the substrate. The female then picks it up and will store it until ready to fertilize eggs. Once the spermatophore is deposited, the male walks forward with his tail standing straight up. He then proceeds to undulate his tail while the base of the tail touches the chin of the female. This causes the tail's base to rub over most of the female's chin.

The females will lay eggs in the summer following their mating. The eggs are sticky when laid and will allow the egg mass to adhere wherever applied. The egg mass can contain between 16-160 eggs. The females will protect this egg mass until they hatch, usually in late summer or early fall. The larvae may stay around the mother after hatching but do not directly depend on her. Larvae for this species remain in this larval stage for multiple years, some up to four years. It takes the post-metamorphosis individual another four years before reaching sexual maturity.

== Predation and enemies ==
Fish are the main predators of the spring salamander, including the Brook Trout (Salvelinus fontinalis). Survival of the spring salamander is reduced by over 50% in the presence of fingerling brook trout with an even greater reduction in the presence of adult fish. The growth of spring salamanders is reduced by as much as 90% in areas where spring salamanders and brook trout coexist. Enemies include the Ocoee salamander, who is more likely to flee when it encounters the spring salamander. Other predators of this species include the Eastern Garter Snake (Thamnophis sirtalis) and the Northern Water Snake (Nerodia sipedon). Larger specimens of this species will also exhibit cannibalism of smaller individuals. This species will also put off a toxin through their skin to try and ward off predation.

== Conservation status ==
The IUCN Red List categorizes the Spring salamander as least concern, and the United States Federal list has no specific status noted for G. porphyriticus. However in the states of New Jersey, Connecticut, Mississippi, Massachusetts, Rhode Island and Texas, G. porphyriticus is listed as threatened. These state populations are threatened primarily due to deforestation, agriculture, and introduction of fish for sport such as trout. The Adirondack / Appalachian population in Québec, Canada has been listed as threatened on Schedule 1 of the Species at Risk Act since 2017.

== Subspecies ==
- Northern spring salamander (Gyrinophilus porphyriticus porphyriticus)
- Kentucky spring salamander (Gyrinophilus porphyriticus duryi)
- Blue Ridge spring salamander (Gyrinophilus porphyriticus danielsi)
- Carolina spring salamander (Gyrinophilus porphyriticus dunni)
