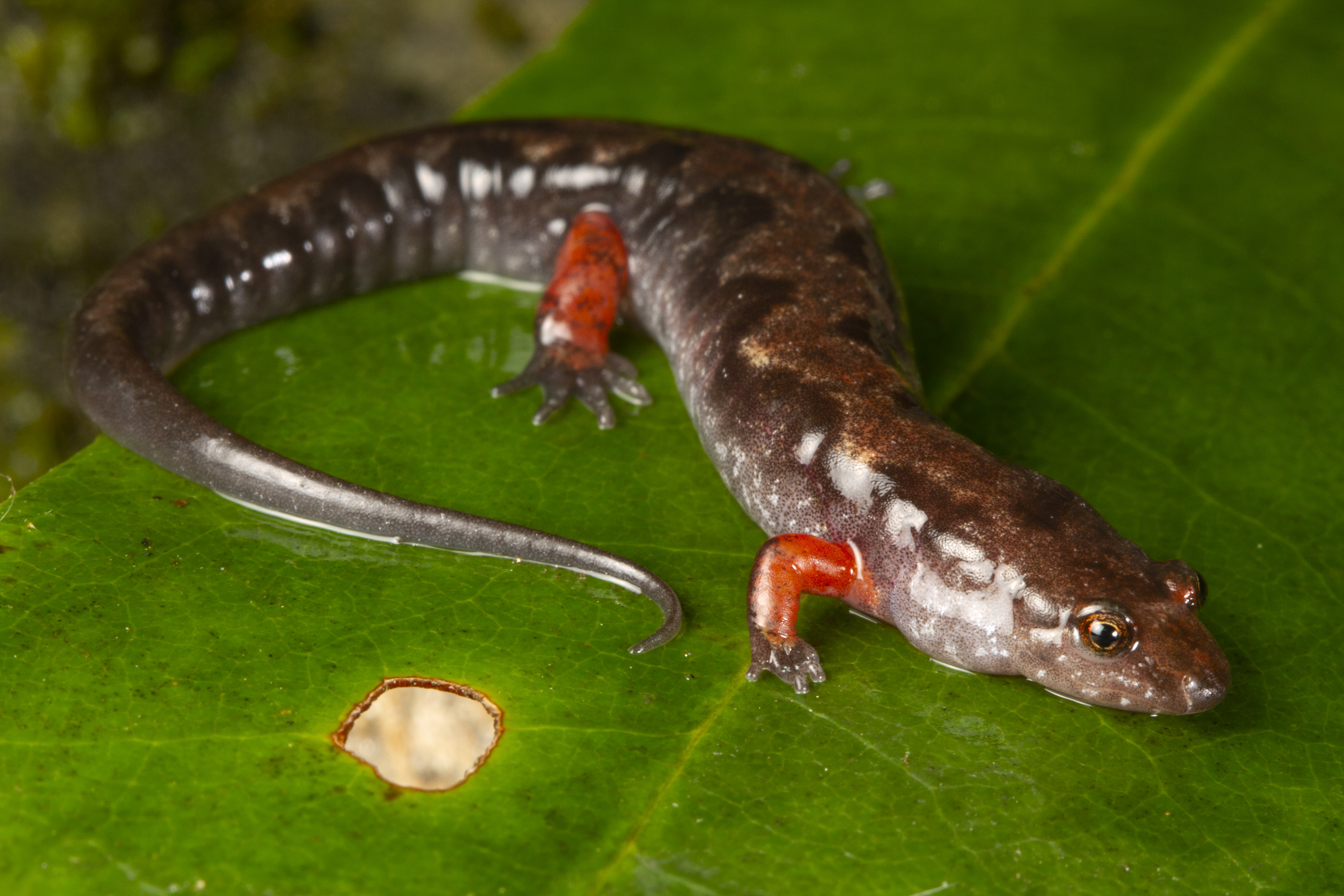

Conservation status
- Least Concern (IUCN 3.1)

Scientific classification
- Kingdom: Animalia
- Phylum: Chordata
- Class: Amphibia
- Order: Urodela
- Family: Plethodontidae
- Genus: Desmognathus
- Species: D. ocoee

Binomial name
- Desmognathus ocoee Nicholls, 1949

= Ocoee salamander =

Species of amphibian

The ocoee salamander (Desmognathus ocoee) is a species of salamander in the family Plethodontidae. This salamander has a variety of colors and patterns, and got its name from Tennessee state wildflower. Its natural habitats are temperate forests, rivers, intermittent rivers, freshwater springs and wet rocks in mountainous areas of the Southeastern United States. It was first described by Nicholls in 1949. They are territorial and feed on small invertebrates. It is widely distributed in the southeastern United States and is listed as "Least Concern" by the International Union for Conservation of Nature.

== Description ==
The ocoee salamander (Desmognathus ocoee) is a small mountain dusky salamander that exhibits a wide range of colors and patterns. The species got its name from the Tennessee state wildflower and symbol Passiflora incarnata (passionflower), which is termed "ocoee" in the Cherokee tribe. The Ocoee River and the Ocoee salamander were thus named after the Cherokee word for passionflower. Some individuals have distinct red, yellow, or orange patches on their legs and cheeks. Populations in central Tennessee, northwestern Georgia, and northeastern Alabama usually have a dark brown or black color, and faded larval spots. Compared to other Desmognathus species, Desmognathus ocoee have smaller bodies (around 7–11 cm), shorter and narrower heads, longer limbs, and no vomerine teeth in adult males. Juveniles have pairs of alternating pale spots on their middorsal line. As they move on to adulthood, these spots might fuse.

== Habitat and distribution ==
=== Habitat ===
The ocoee salamander is found in two separate populations. The more numerous is in the Blue Ridge Mountains and at lower levels in the gorges of the rivers Hiwassee, Ocoee, Tugaloo and Tallulah. The less numerous population is in the Appalachian Plateau in northeastern Alabama. It is found over a greater range of altitudes than other members of the genus Desmognathus. At lower levels it is an aquatic species but at higher altitudes it is mostly terrestrial. It is found close to fast flowing mountain streams, in seepage areas, on moist forest floors and on wet rocks. In cove valleys in the Appalachian Mountains it prefers hardwood forests with trees that are more than eighty-five years old.

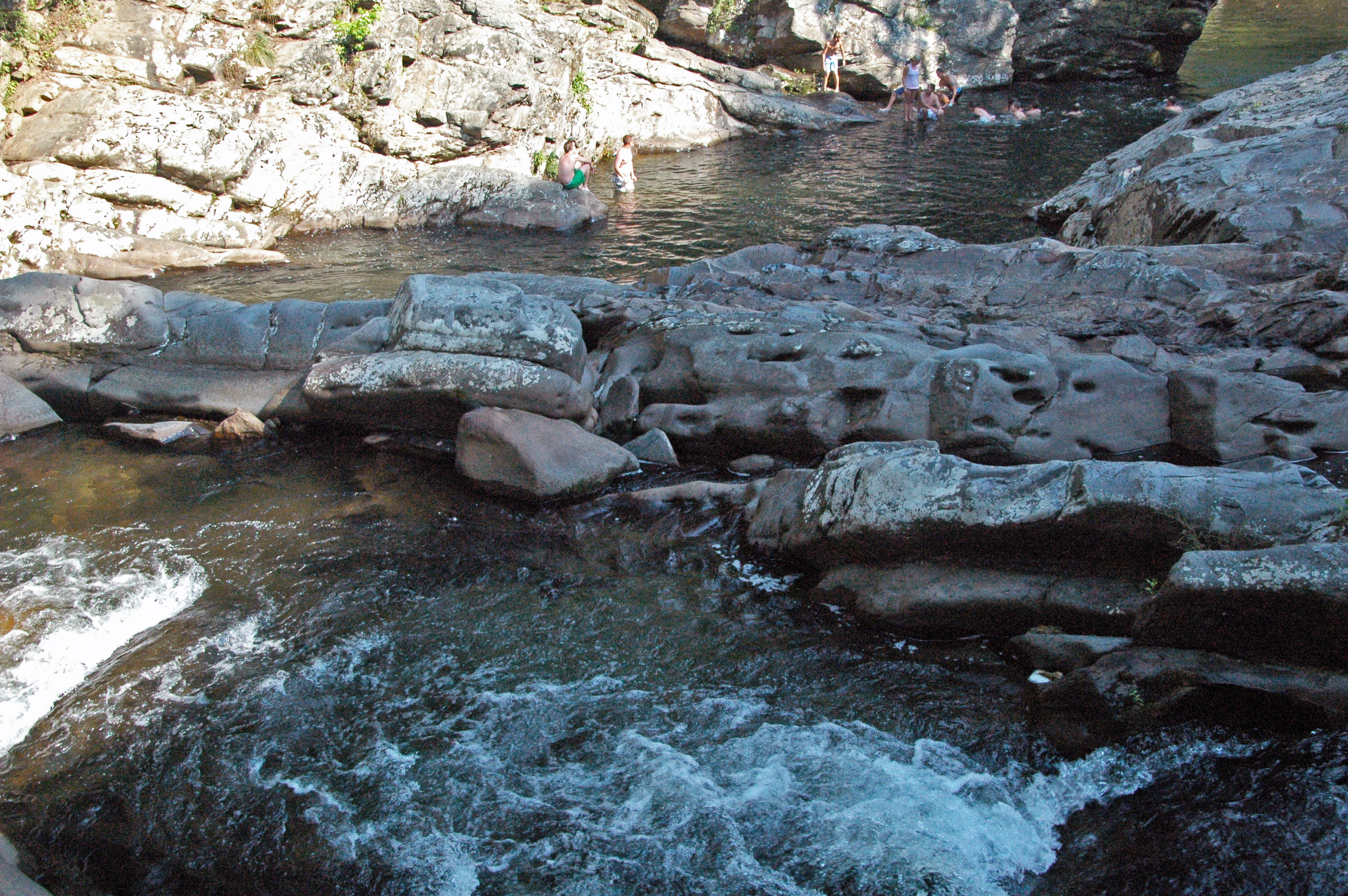
Ocoee River in the Great Smoky Mountains, Tennessee

Semi-aquatic salamanders like the ocoee contribute considerably to the terrestrial vertebrate biomass. They depend on water for reproduction, but their short larval period allows them to take advantage of wetted habitats such as small streams and wet rock faces. Despite this, they are the most terrestrial of the stream-breeding Desmognathus salamanders. Under moist conditions, they will leave streambeds and move into the forest. They prefer cove forests of more than 85 years of age, with a significant amount of emergent rocks. These rocks are important for soil moisture retention, and are thus vital for the survival of D. ocoee eggs during brooding. As vertebrate predators, D. ocoee are integral to the dynamics of the food webs around their habitat. They can often be found some distance from a water source, usually in the forest at higher elevations. Population densities on wet rock faces are around six adults per meter square. Overall, the population trends for the ocoee salamanders in the Appalachian Mountains have not changed significantly in the last twenty years.

== Population structure, speciation, and phylogeny ==
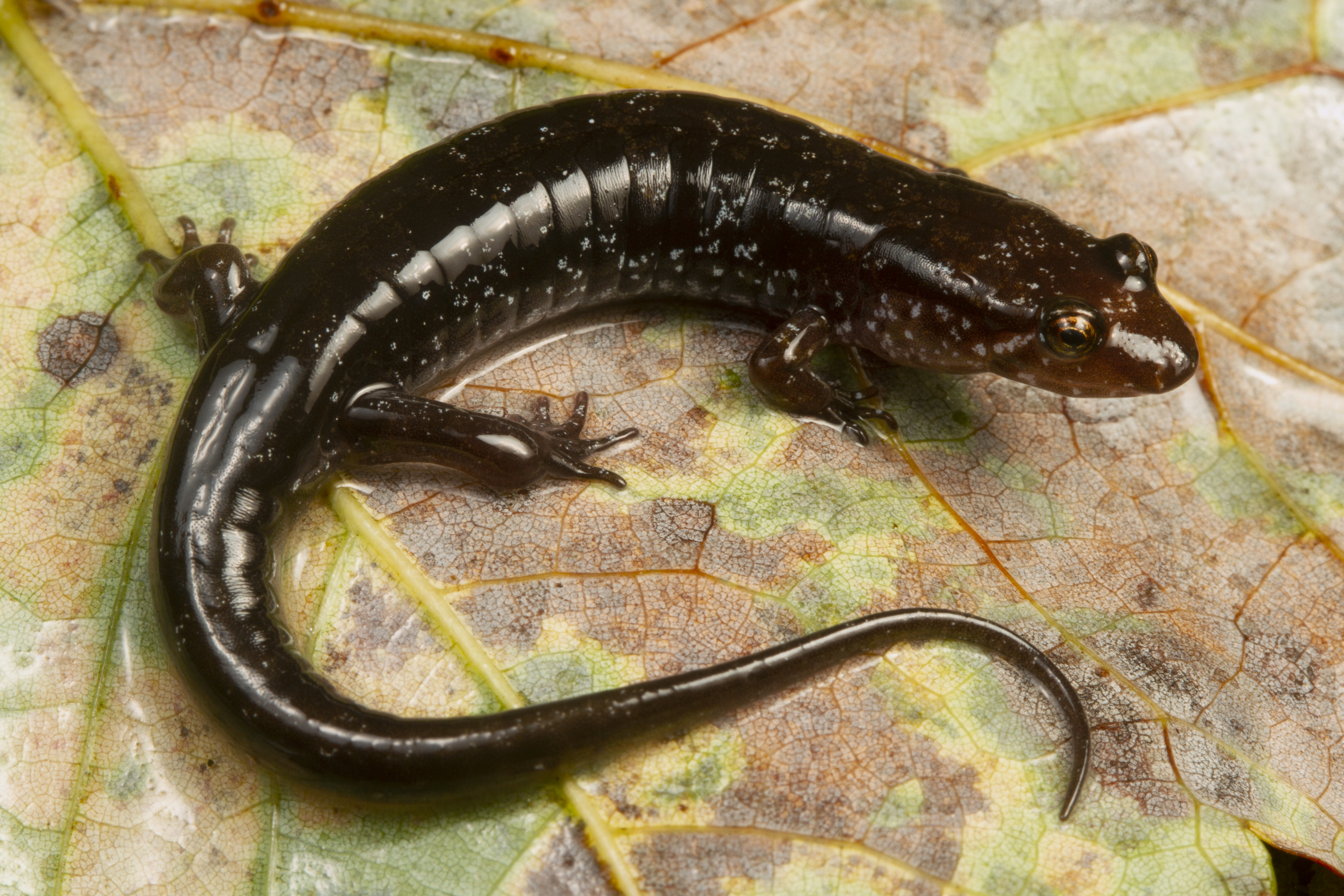
Dark-colored ocoee salamander

=== Close relatives ===
The ocoee salamander has gone through various classifications in the last century. Originally considered as a single species (D. ochrophaeus), populations of Desmognathus salamanders across the Appalachians are now divided into five distinct species D. abditus, D. carolinensis, D. ochrophaeus, D. ocoee, and D. orestes. These five species do not form a phylogenetic clade and are differently related to one another, but complete reproductive isolation is rarely observed in distantly related Desmognathus, and thus some hybridization between geographically-close lineages occurs. The "gray zone" that contains the potential arguments on species delimitation still exists, but genetic analyses provide enough evidence for the delimitation of these five species.

=== Genetic population structure ===
Before the advancement of genetic and molecular techniques, the classification of plethodontids was limited by geographical and morphological differences between individuals and groups. This was not a very accurate method for taxonomy because the color patterns and phenotypic variations among the family of Plethodontids was conserved and the genetic underpinnings of these morphological traits were not well known. In genetic studies in the past few decades, by the use of biochemical markers, it has been shown that this conservatism of morphological traits in many of the salamanders of the family Plethodontidae actually sometimes masks complex patterns of genetic differentiation. These genetic studies ultimately allowed for better-defined species delimitation of Desmognathus ocoee.

== Territoriality and diet ==
The ocoee salamander maintains a small territory when on land, which it defends against other conspecific members. The Ocoee salamanders feed on insects and other small invertebrates. Potential prey species include flies, ants, wasps, beetles, spiders, mites.

Studies suggest that larval D. ocoee prefer to feed at low elevation rock faces and high elevation woodland habitats over high elevation rock faces. This is likely due to the cooler environment associated with elevated altitudes, which reduces the salamander's general activity levels.

The ocoee salamander was used as a study subject to measure the impact of stress on feeding behavior. Stress was induced either by 1) repeated handling, or 2) CORT glucocorticoid hormone administered via a dermal patch. Both stressful conditions led to reduced feeding in females, and reduced activity and body weight in both sexes compared to a control group.

== Predators ==
It is preyed upon by birds, snakes, and even another species of salamander. The ocoee salamander has developed many different anti-predator defenses to use in different situations. When approached by a predator it may remain immobile, but is more likely to flee when it encounters the Spring salamander (Gyrinophilus porphyriticus). The salamanders are also prone to autotomizing the tail to avoid an attack. When attacked by a snake, ocoee salamanders writhe about and try to bite the snake on the head.

== Mating ==
=== Pheromones ===
Pheromonal communication is very common in salamanders, newts, and even in some frogs and toads. Pheromones are chemosensory stimuli that are used to signal information between individuals of the same species. In vertebrates, there are two types of pheromones. Releasing pheromones are usually peptides and proteins that influence behaviors (such as male-female or male-male interactions) through neural systems that detect and process pheromones. Priming pheromones modify the endocrine system or the psychological mood of the individual. Usually, these different types of pheromones exist as a mixture, so they have complex behavioral and psychological effects. Pheromones from other individuals are detected by the chemosensory receptors on the vomeronasal organ and main olfactory epithelium. Chemosensory cues such as pheromones play an important role in mating because they bring males and females together in both aquatic and terrestrial environments. These cues can signal a variety of information to others in the surrounding area, including the species, sex, and the reproductive condition of the individual. Once suitable partners have been attracted, these cues can also help determine mate quality.

=== Courting ===
Sexually active adults use a variety of tools to court each other before copulation occurs. As is common in the plethodontids, a female is exposed to tactile, chemical, and visual stimuli presented by the male. The females will also signal attraction through chemical cues, reduced tendencies to flee from courting males, and a willingness to engage in tail-straddle walk, which is the phase in courtship where insemination occurs. This course of behaviors from both individuals will lead to successful copulation.

=== Copulation ===
Ocoee salamanders do internal fertilization. When a female is ready for mating, the male uses a spermatophore to transfer his sperm to a female. A spermatophore is a gelatinous capsule containing spermatozoa, and it is accepted into the female's reproductive organ, the cloaca, where it is stored until fertilization. The male typically leads the female to the spermatophore for her to pick it up.

=== Number of mates ===
Ocoee salamanders do internal fertilization and thus postcopulatory sexual selection plays an important role in their reproduction. In adult Desmognathus ocoee, the mating period lasts from early fall to late spring. Females tend to engage in multiple matings throughout these 9 months, and store sperm in their bodies for extensive periods. This means that a clutch of female eggs can be fertilized by stored sperm from multiple competing males. Usually it is around two to three males. Sperm competition within males is thus an important aspect of sexual selection. Sperm from the males are stored in spermatheca, an organ in the female's reproductive tract, until June and July, during which ovulation, fertilization, and oviposition all occur rapidly. Until the fertilization event, sperm require hospitable conditions to survive in, and are stored in the spermatheca, where they remain viable.

Females that experience courtship that ends with successful insemination do not become inseminated when they encounter sexually active males for about four nights after the first insemination. This is caused by a temporary inhibition of female sexual responsiveness, which happens during the initial insemination. Upon the female taking in the spermatophore into her reproductive tract, the sperm mass remains externally visible in the female's cloaca for around 38 hours. This extended stay of the sperm mass likely results in tactical and chemical stimulation, which inhibits the female's sexual responsiveness and her willingness to perform behavioral patterns necessary for successful courtship and sperm transfer. Ultimately, this seems to be a mechanism developed in males to compete with other males for egg fertilization.

== Parental care ==
=== Oviposition ===
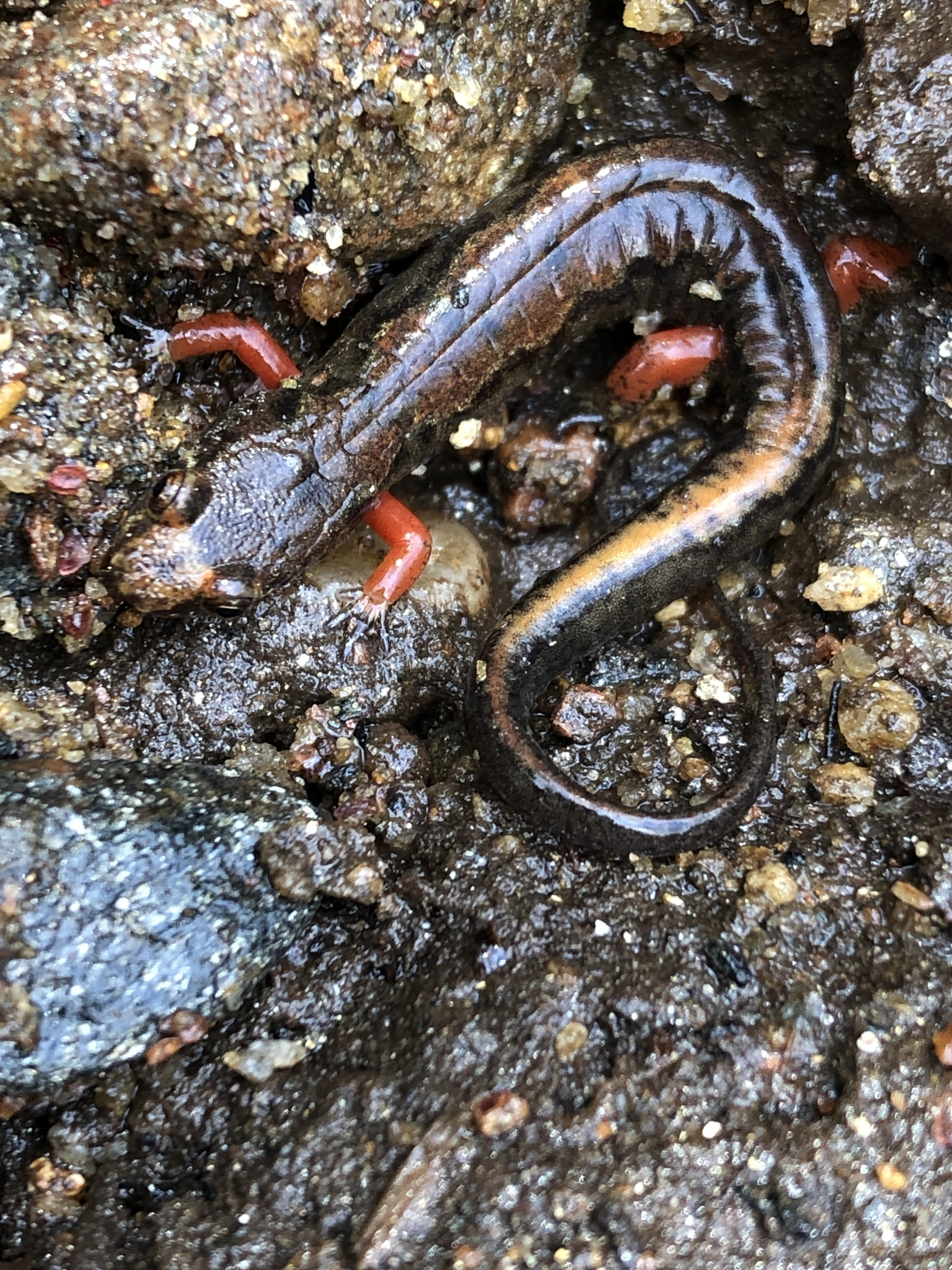
Desmognathus ocoee

Oviposition occurs from June to September on land, after which the female tends her clutch of 9–32 eggs for 6–8 weeks. Clutch sizes can vary from female to female, and is closely related to the body size of the female. During oviposition, females tend to deposit their eggs in cavities under rocks, moss, decaying logs, leaf litter, springs, and behind vegetation or in other crevices. It is important to pick a spot with just enough moisture to avoid the desiccation and loss of eggs.

=== Egg guarding ===
After oviposition, maternal care for the clutch lasts for about 3 months, and ends after the eggs hatch into larvae. Maternal care during brooding includes defense against predators, removal of dead eggs, reduction of egg desiccation and fungal infections, and helping the hatchlings with cracking open their shells. If left unguarded, the eggs are in danger of being eaten by surrounding salamanders. Males do not provide resources to either the female or the offspring.

Oophagy seems to be a normal behavior in brooding females, but is usually suppressed. In the case of limited foraging availability, disturbed or starved females may choose to eat their own eggs. This may also be done if the egg is dead—the female will eat the dead egg in order to remove it from the clutch before it infects other eggs around it. Fungal infections from dead eggs (if not removed in time) will usually lead to the embryos in viable eggs being smothered and killed.

Larvae are smaller than in other subspecies, reaching around 8–10 mm at hatching. Upon hatching, D. ocoee larvae have short and silvery external gills, and they often have distinctive larval spots that other species do not have. The tails of the larvae are keeled and they narrow to a knife edge along the dorsal surface. Once out of the egg, the larvae quickly disperse to a nearby water source. During their development, they are found in shallow waters or in thin films of water, they feed on small aquatic invertebrates. In captivity, they can also eat worms. Usually, the larvae metamorphose into their adult form in the following few weeks, the time depending on the availability of food, other resources in the environment, and the temperature.

== Conservation status ==
The ocoee salamander is one of the most common salamanders in the southern Appalachian Mountains. It is believed to have a large and stable population and much of its range lies in state parks or other protected areas. It faces few threats and is listed as being of "Least Concern" in the IUCN Red List of Threatened Species.
