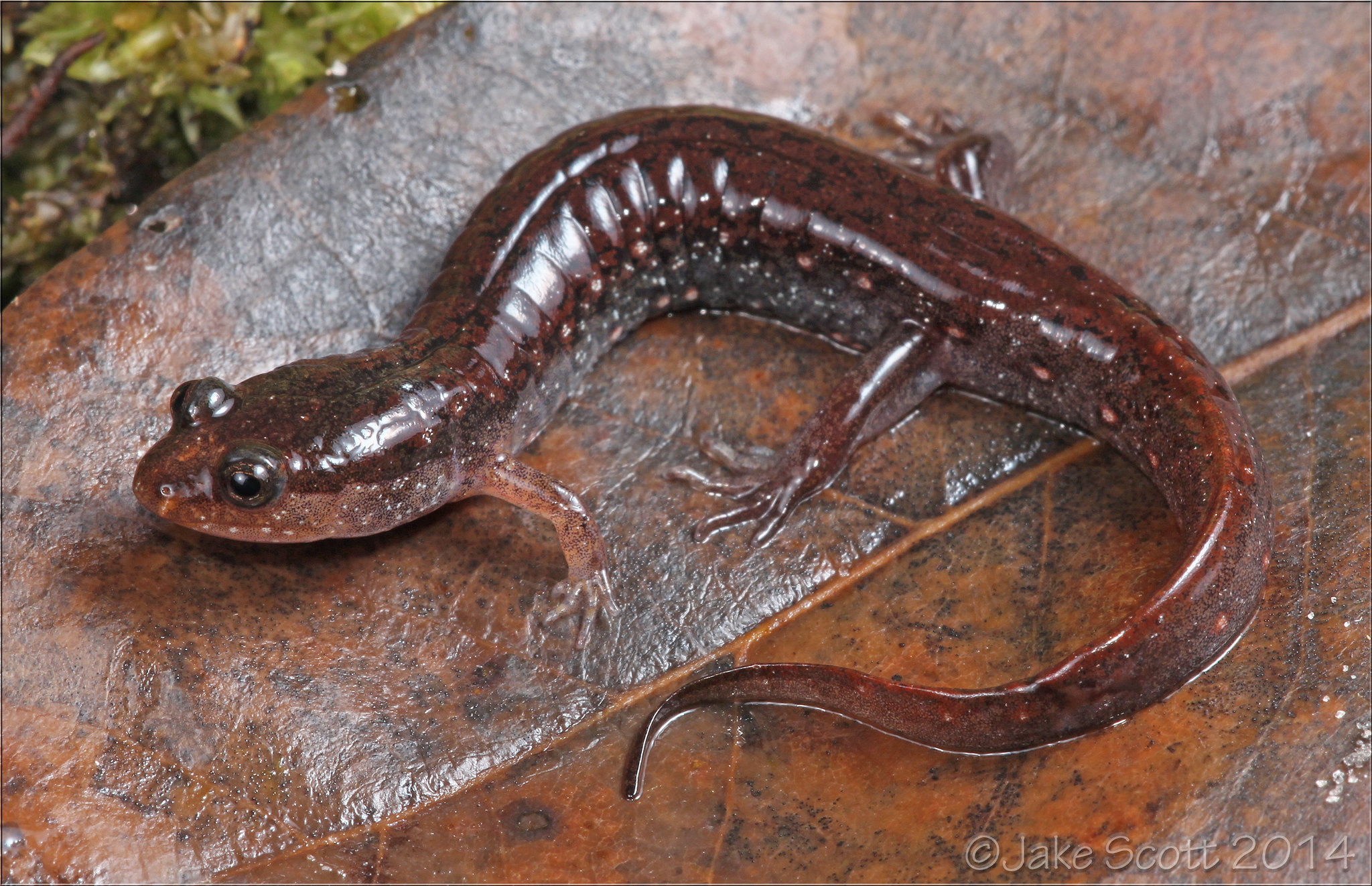

Conservation status
- Least Concern (IUCN 3.1)

Scientific classification
- Kingdom: Animalia
- Phylum: Chordata
- Class: Amphibia
- Order: Urodela
- Family: Plethodontidae
- Genus: Desmognathus
- Species: D. auriculatus

Binomial name
- Desmognathus auriculatus (Holbrook, 1838)

Synonyms
- Salamandra auriculata Holbrook, 1838; Cylindrosoma auriculatum Duméril, Bibron, and Duméril, 1854; Desmognathus fuscus auriculatus Boulenger, 1882

= Holbrook's southern dusky salamander =

Species of amphibian

Holbrook's southern dusky salamander (Desmognathus auriculatus), previously known as the southern dusky salamander, is a species of salamander endemic to the southeastern United States. Older sources often refer to it as the eared triton. Formerly abundant, it has precipitously declined since the 1960s.

== Taxonomy ==
As previously defined as the southern dusky salamander, it was thought to range from southern Virginia south to Florida, and west to Texas. However, a 2008 study found D. auriculatus as previously defined to be polyphyletic, with many populations being assigned to this species on the basis of similar morphology; for example, Texas populations were found to belong to the spotted dusky salamander (D. conanti). Several other populations assigned to this species were found to be northern dusky salamander (D. fuscus), D. conanti, or undescribed species. In 2017, one of these species was described as Valentine's southern dusky salamander (D. valentinei). A 2020 study identified three distinct mito-nuclear lineages that likely represented distinct species: D. auriculatus A (D. auriculatus sensu stricto), D. auriculatus B, and D. auriculatus C.

It was described by John Edwards Holbrook and renamed after him in 2017 to distinguish it from D. valentinei.

Desmognathus fuscus carri was a subspecies of the northern dusky salamander thought to have existed in peninsular Florida prior to its unexplained disappearance in the 1970s. A 2021 phylogenetic analysis found it to belong to D. auriculatus sensu stricto, albeit being a distinct genetic lineage of it.

== Distribution ==
The three lineages presently assigned to D. auriculatus range along the Atlantic coastal plain from southern Virginia south to peninsular Florida, and west to the Florida Panhandle and southern Alabama. However, populations from Virginia south to Georgia are now thought to belong to the distantly related lineages D. auriculatus B and D. auriculatus C, representing undescribed species. D. auriculatus A, the "true" D. auriculatus, ranges from southern Georgia south to peninsular Florida, and west to the Florida Panhandle and southern Alabama.

== Description ==
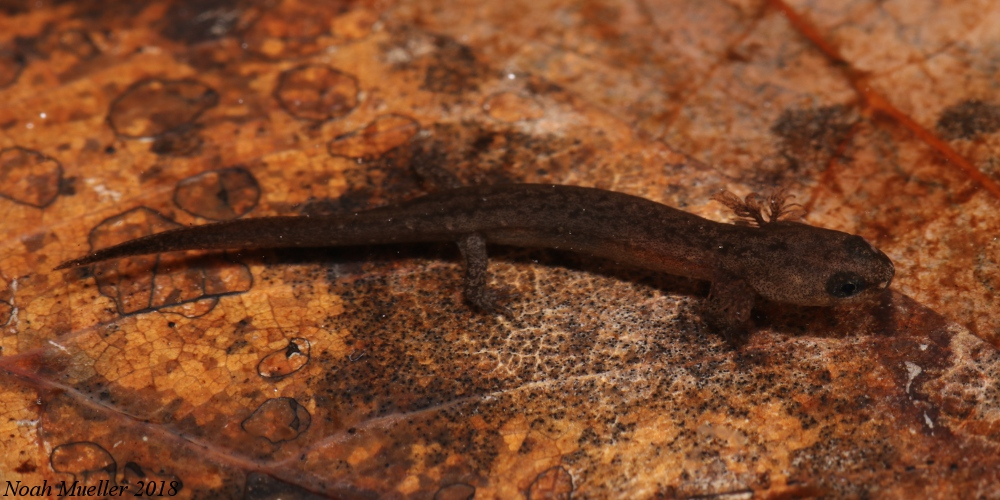
Southern Dusky Salamander larva

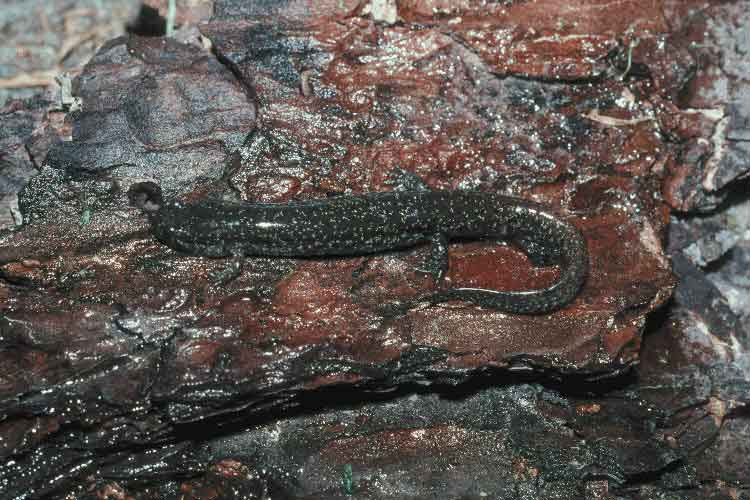
D. auriculatus on a log

Holbrook's southern dusky salamander grows from 3 to 6 inches in length. It is typically dark brown to black in color, with a long tail, and rear legs which are noticeably larger than its front legs.

== Behavior ==
Holbrook's southern dusky salamander prefers tannic, swampy areas near ponds or on the flood plain of streams and rivers. It is largely nocturnal. Breeding takes place in the fall months, and females lay eggs in moist, sheltered areas of ground debris.

== Threats ==
The "true" D. auriculatus, D. auriculatus A, was formerly abundant but has experienced major, unexplained declines since the late 1960s to 1970s, disappearing from large areas of optimal, undisturbed habitat. They are now found in less than 1 percent of their former range. Although it persists at several sites in southern Georgia and northern Florida, it has seemed to have disappeared entirely from peninsular Florida. The exact causes of these declines remain unknown, as other salamanders inhabiting the areas, including other Desmognathus species, have not seen the same declines experienced by D. auriculatus.
