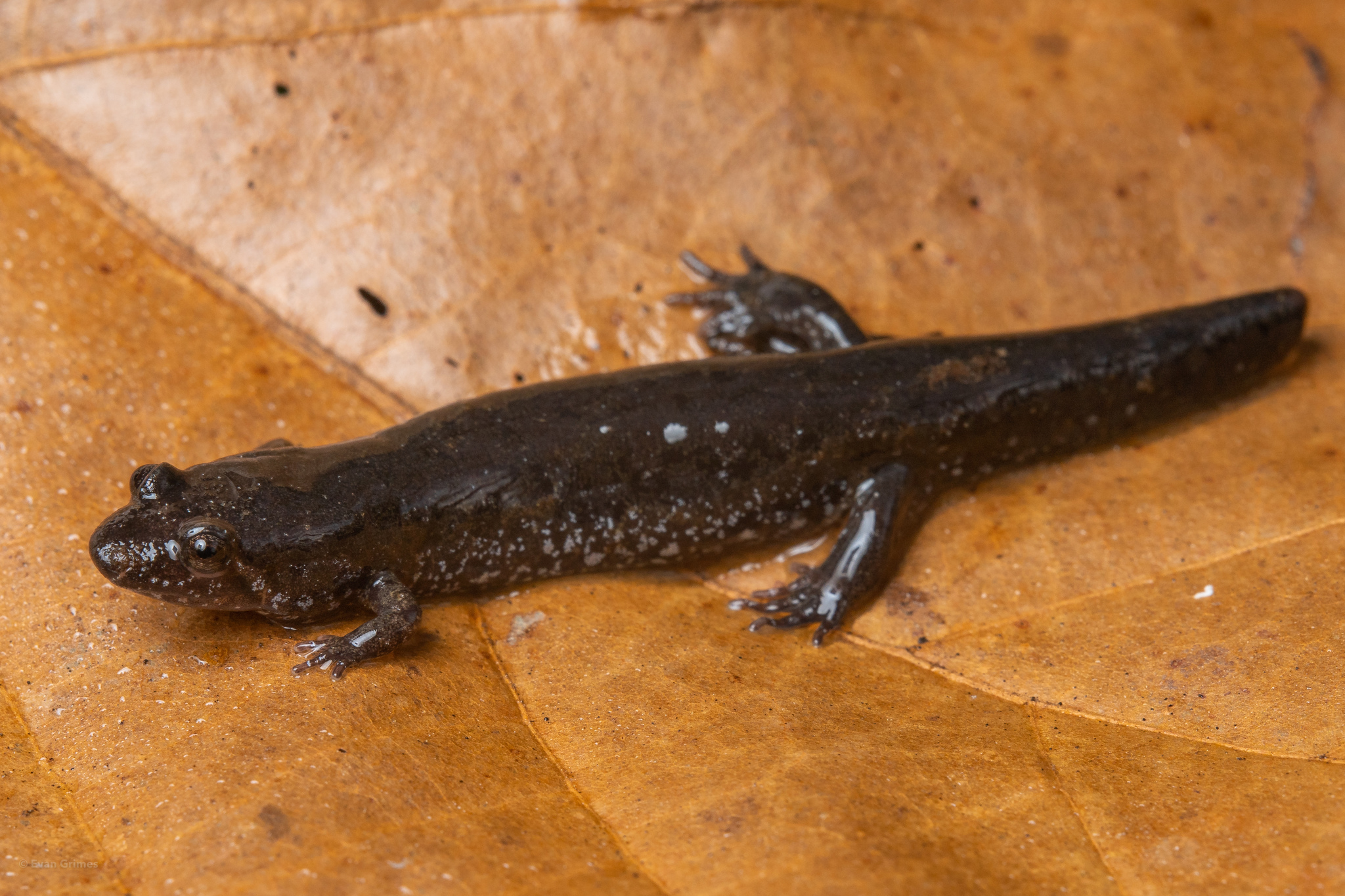

Conservation status
- Least Concern (IUCN 3.1)

- Apparently Secure (NatureServe)

Scientific classification
- Kingdom: Animalia
- Phylum: Chordata
- Class: Amphibia
- Order: Urodela
- Family: Plethodontidae
- Genus: Desmognathus
- Species: D. apalachicolae

Binomial name
- Desmognathus apalachicolae Means & Karlin, 1989
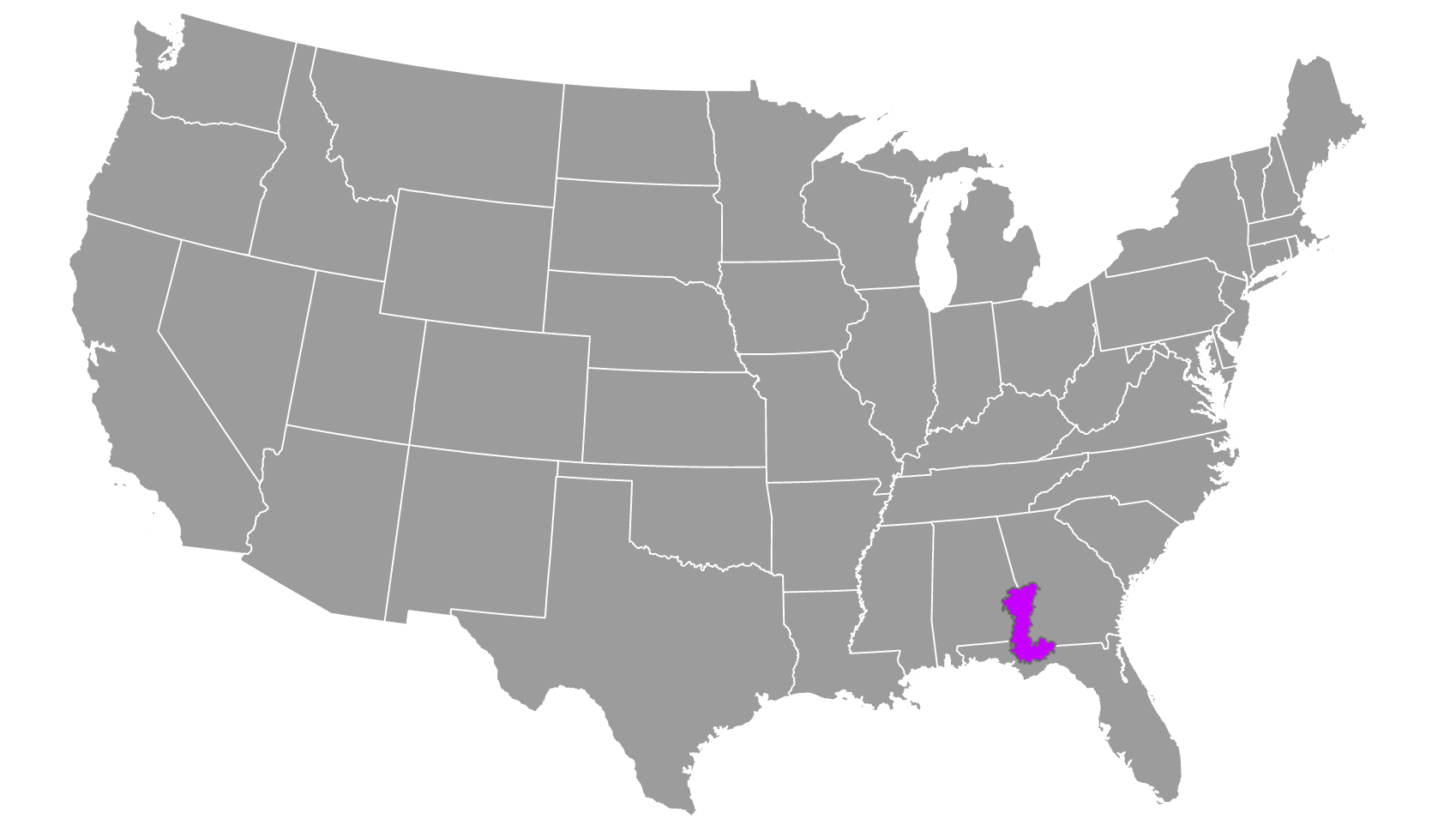
- Apalachicola dusky salamander range

= Apalachicola dusky salamander =

Species of amphibian

The Apalachicola dusky salamander (Desmognathus apalachicolae) is a species of salamander in the family Plethodontidae. It is threatened by habitat loss.

== Distribution ==
The species is endemic to Alabama, Florida, and Georgia, in the Southeastern United States. Its natural habitats are temperate forests, intermittent rivers, and freshwater springs.
