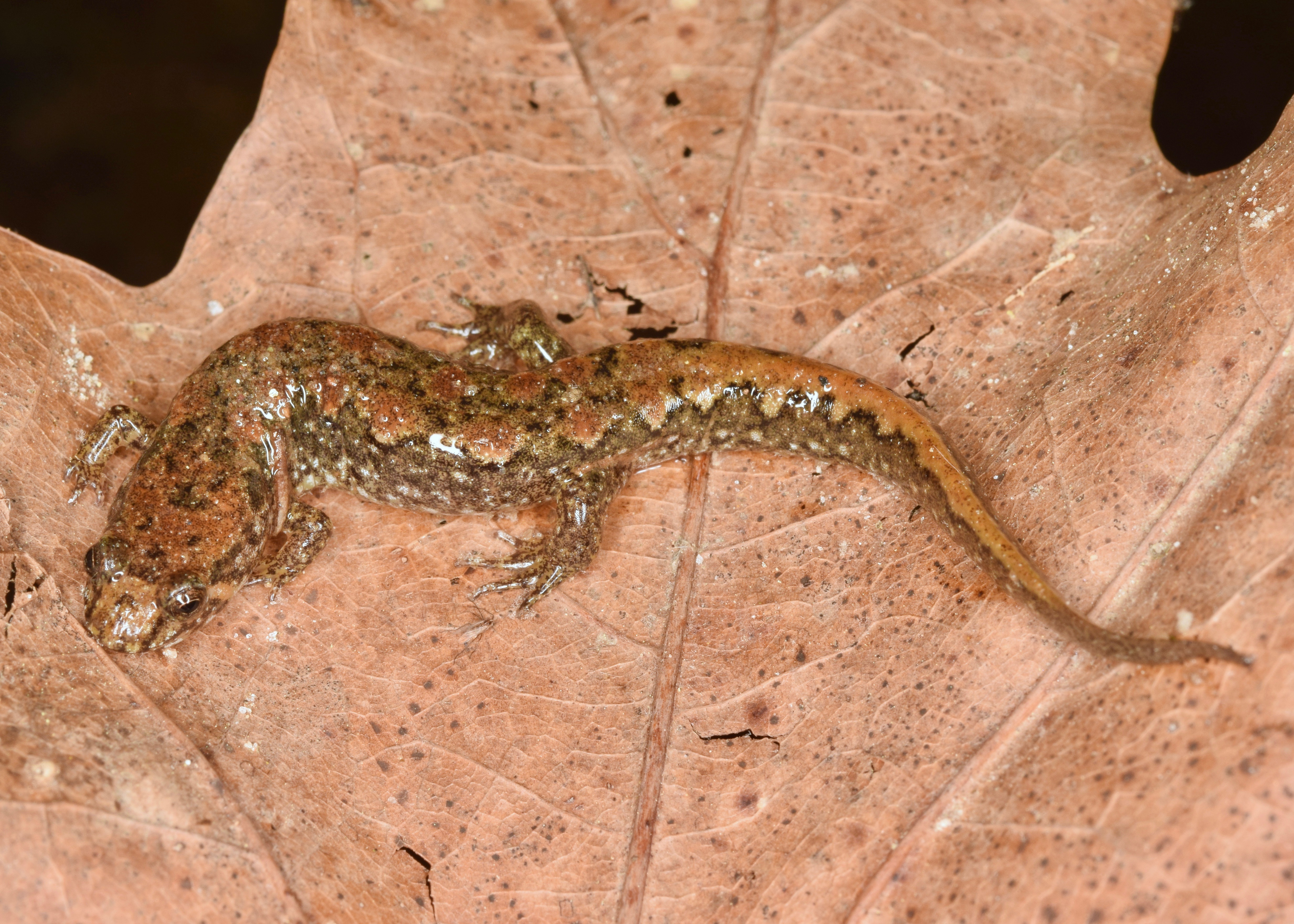

Conservation status
- Secure (NatureServe)

Scientific classification
- Kingdom: Animalia
- Phylum: Chordata
- Class: Amphibia
- Order: Urodela
- Family: Plethodontidae
- Genus: Desmognathus
- Species: D. conanti

Binomial name
- Desmognathus conanti Rossman, 1958

Synonyms
- Desmognathus fuscus conanti

= Spotted dusky salamander =

Species of salamander

The spotted dusky salamander (Desmognathus conanti) is a species of salamander in the family Plethodontidae. It is endemic to the United States.

== Taxonomy ==
Desmognathus conanti was described in 1958 by Douglas A. Rossman, but was later reclassified as a subspecies of the northern dusky salamander (D. fuscus). However, numerous genetic and morphological studies since then have affirmed it as being a distinct species and it was elevated to full specific status in 1996. In addition, genetic studies indicate that D. conanti is paraphyletic with respect to the Santeetlah dusky salamander (D. santeelah), which lies nested within it; thus, D. conanti itself likely represents a species complex of multiple undescribed cryptic species.

== Range and Habitat ==
Desmognathus conanti has a wide range in the southeastern and south-central United States, ranging from southern Illinois south to the panhandle of Florida, and west to Louisiana and southern Arkansas. They are semiaquatic, typically inhabit cool, forested seeps or streams/streamsides.

== Description ==
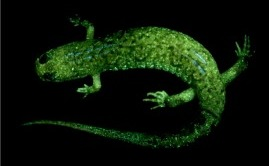
D. conanti fluorescing

Desmognathus conanti is a medium sized salamander, between 35-40 mm in body length at sexual maturity and is moderately stout with a moderately keeled tail. It is described as having a bright color pattern and colored stripe behind its eyes. It has several pairs of golden spots on the dorsum, which are larval spots often retained as adults that may sometimes fuse to form a light dorsal stripe in adults. The belly is light with dark flecks. It closely resembles D. fuscus and D. santeetlah, and is thus best distinguished from them by range.

== Mating ==
Females typically move or turn away as males approach and the males must follow slowly after the female. The male will perform a variety of movements including a jerking movement with its head, a "butterfly" movement with its forelimbs(where it swings them in circular motions simultaneously) a nudge of the female with the head, a head rub, or tail undulation. With the male's tail undulating, it will attempt to slide the stationary female onto it and essentially drag her forward and deposit his spermatophore in order for her to receive it through her cloaca.
