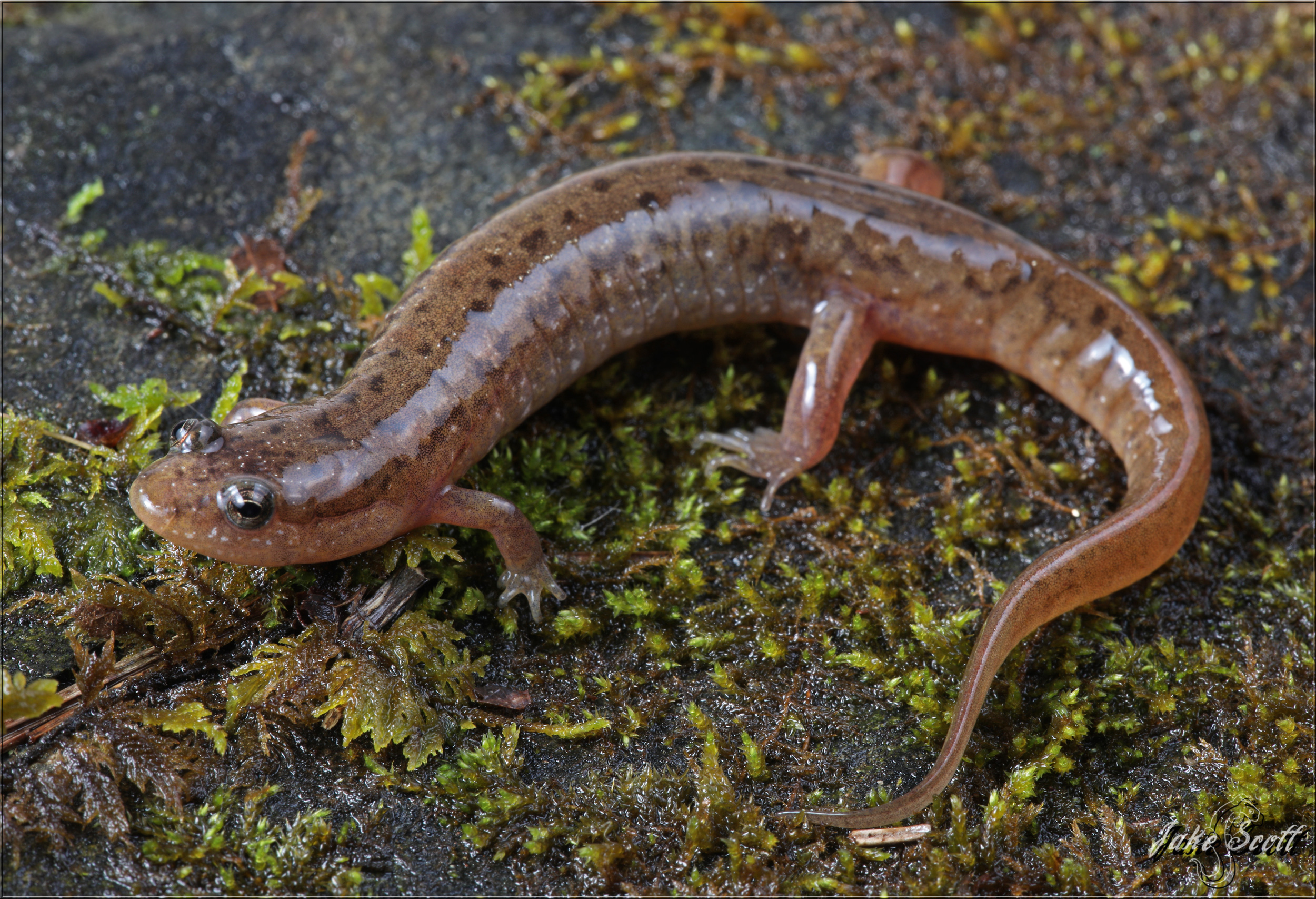

Conservation status
- Endangered (IUCN 3.1)

- Vulnerable (NatureServe)

Scientific classification
- Kingdom: Animalia
- Phylum: Chordata
- Class: Amphibia
- Order: Urodela
- Family: Plethodontidae
- Genus: Desmognathus
- Species: D. planiceps

Binomial name
- Desmognathus planiceps Newman, 1955

= Flat-headed salamander =

Species of salamander

The flat-headed salamander (Desmognathus planiceps) is a species of salamander in the family Plethodontidae. It is endemic to the United States, where it is known from Virginia and likely North Carolina.

== Taxonomy ==
Desmognathus planiceps was described in 1955 but was later reclassified as synonymous with the northern dusky salamander (D. fuscus). However, a phylogenetic study in 2008 affirmed it as being a distinct species, and it was thus revived as such.

== Distribution ==
It is found in the Blue Ridge Mountains and adjacent Piedmont of Virginia, ranging from southern Roanoke County south to the headwaters of the Dan River in Patrick County and east to Pittsylvania County. Potential specimens referable to this species are also known from the New River drainage in Floyd County and potentially adjacent regions of North Carolina.

== Description ==
Desmognathus planiceps closely resembles many other species in the genus Desmognathus, but can be distinguished by its flattened head, reddish-brown dorsal stripe dotted with dark spots, and tan spots on the venter.
