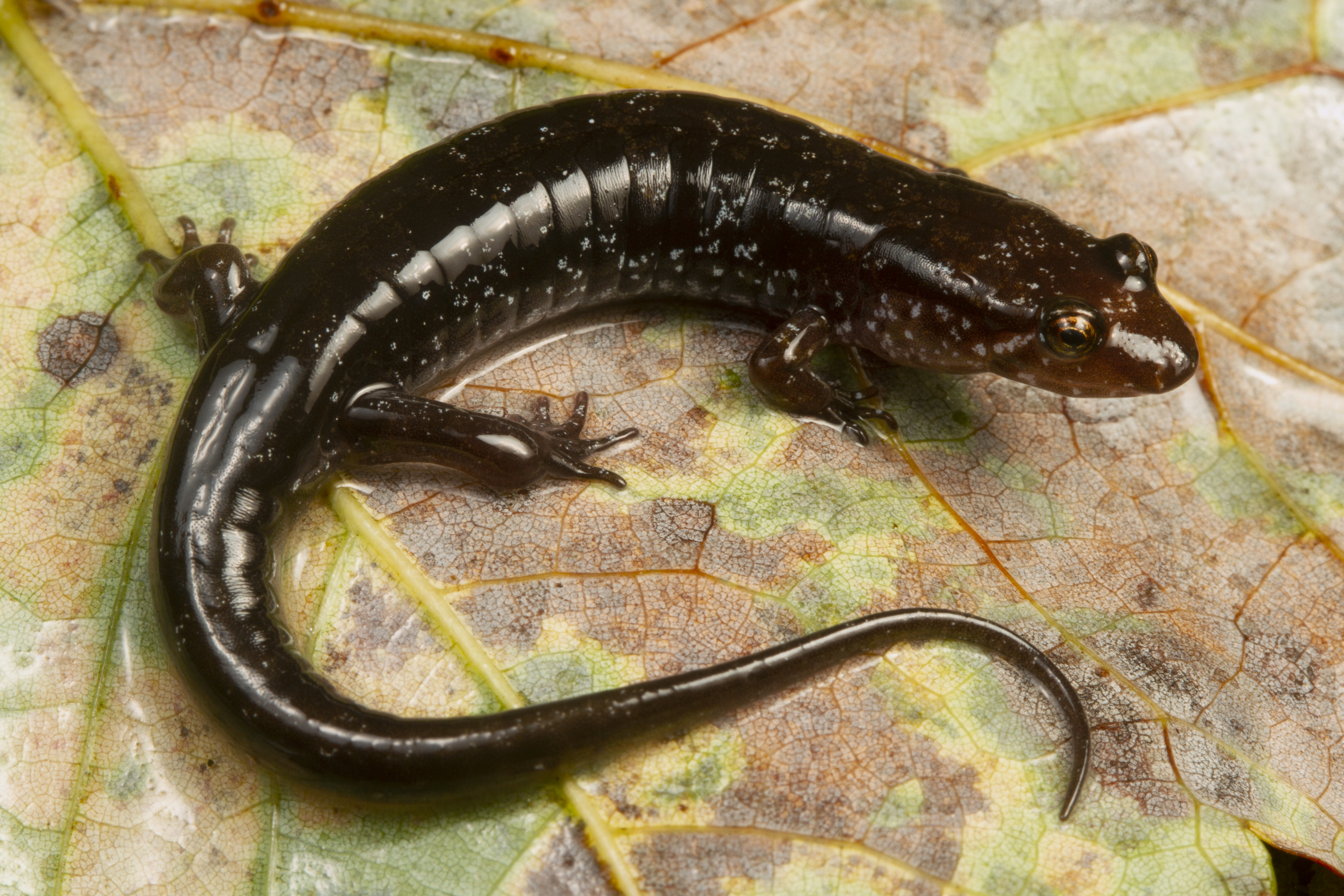
- Ocoee salamander (Desmognathus ocoee)

Scientific classification
- Kingdom: Animalia
- Phylum: Chordata
- Class: Amphibia
- Order: Urodela
- Family: Plethodontidae
- Subfamily: Plethodontinae
- Genus: Desmognathus; Baird, 1850

Species
- See table.

= Desmognathus =

Genus of salamanders

Desmognathus is a genus of lungless salamanders in the family Plethodontidae known as dusky salamanders. They range throughout the eastern United States as far west as Texas, and north to southeastern Canada.

== Characteristics ==
Species of the genus Desmognathus have a unique jaw-opening mechanism where the lower jaw is stationary and the skull swings open. There are additional stalked condyles, an atlanto-mandibular ligament, along with other skeletal and musculature features that have evolved to accompany this type of jaw-opening mechanism. Additionally, they are known to exhibit maternal care by brooding over their eggs.

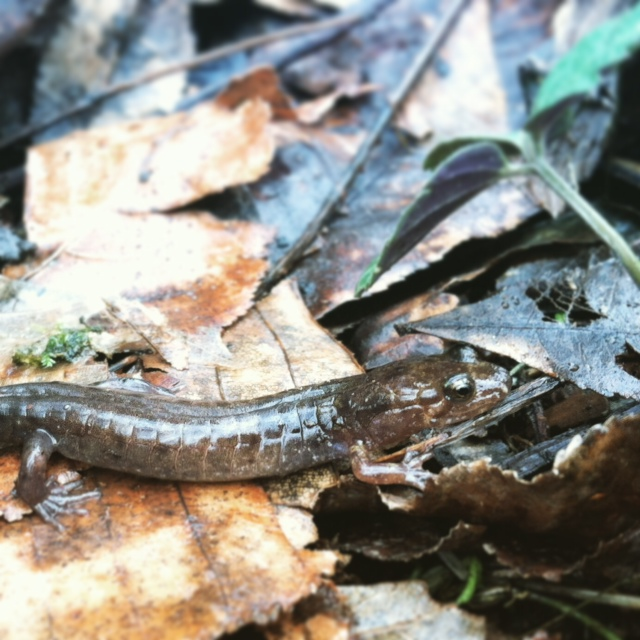
An unidentified Desmognathus species as seen in Great Smoky Mountains National Park, TN.

== Species ==
This genus includes the following 39-40 species:

Binomial Name and Author	Common name
Desmognathus abditus Anderson & Tilley, 2003	Cumberland dusky salamander
Desmognathus adatsihi Pyron and Beamer, 2022	Cherokee mountain dusky salamander
Desmognathus aeneus Brown & Bishop, 1947	Seepage salamander
Desmognathus amphileucus Bishop, 1941	Nantahala blackbelly salamander
Desmognathus anicetus Pyron and Beamer, 2023	Foothills dusky salamander
Desmognathus apalachicolae Means & Karlin, 1989	Apalachicola dusky salamander
Desmognathus aureatus (Martof, 1956)	Golden shovelnose salamander
Desmognathus auriculatus (Holbrook, 1838)	Holbrook's southern dusky salamander
Desmognathus bairdi Pyron and Beamer, 2023	Piedmont dusky salamander
Desmognathus balsameus Pyron and Beamer, 2022	Great Balsams mountain dusky salamander
Desmognathus brimleyorum Stejneger, 1895	Ouachita dusky salamander
Desmognathus campi Pyron and Beamer, 2023	Savannah dusky salamander
Desmognathus carolinensis Dunn, 1916	Carolina mountain dusky salamander
Desmognathus catahoula Pyron and Beamer, 2023	Catahoula spotted dusky salamander
Desmognathus cheaha Pyron and Beamer, 2023	Talladega seal salamander
Desmognathus conanti Rossman, 1958	Spotted dusky salamander
Desmognathus folkertsi Camp, Tilley, Austin & Marshall, 2002	Dwarf blackbelly salamander
Desmognathus fuscus (Rafinesque, 1820)	Northern dusky salamander
Desmognathus gvnigeusgwotli Pyron and Beamer, 2022	Cherokee blackbelly salamander
Desmognathus imitator Dunn, 1927	Imitator salamander
Desmognathus intermedius (Pope, 1928)	Central shovelnose salamander
Desmognathus kanawha Pyron and Beamer, 2022	Kanawha blackbelly salamander
Desmognathus lycos Pyron and Beamer, 2023	Wolf dusky salamander
Desmognathus marmoratus (Moore, 1899)	Shovelnose salamander
Desmognathus mavrokoilius Pyron and Beamer, 2022	Pisgah blackbelly salamander
Desmognathus monticola Dunn, 1916	Seal salamander
Desmognathus ochrophaeus Cope, 1859	Allegheny mountain dusky salamander
Desmognathus ocoee Nicholls, 1949	Ocoee dusky salamander
Desmognathus orestes Tilley & Mahoney, 1996	Blue Ridge dusky salamander
Desmognathus organi Crespi & Browne, 2010	Northern pygmy salamander
Desmognathus pascagoula Pyron, O'Connell, Lamb, and Beamer, 2022	Pascagoula dusky salamander
Desmognathus perlapsus Neill, 1950	Tallulah dusky salamander
Desmognathus planiceps Newman, 1955	Flat-headed salamander
Desmognathus quadramaculatus (Holbrook, 1840)	Blackbelly salamander (defunct)
Desmognathus santeetlah Tilley, 1981	Santeetlah dusky salamander
Desmognathus tilleyi Pyron and Beamer, 2023	Max Patch dusky salamander
Desmognathus valentinei Means, Lamb, and Bernardo, 2017	Valentine's southern dusky salamander
Desmognathus valtos Pyron and Beamer, 2022	Carolina swamp dusky salamander
Desmognathus welteri Barbour, 1950	Black Mountain dusky salamander
Desmognathus wrighti King, 1936	Pygmy salamander
