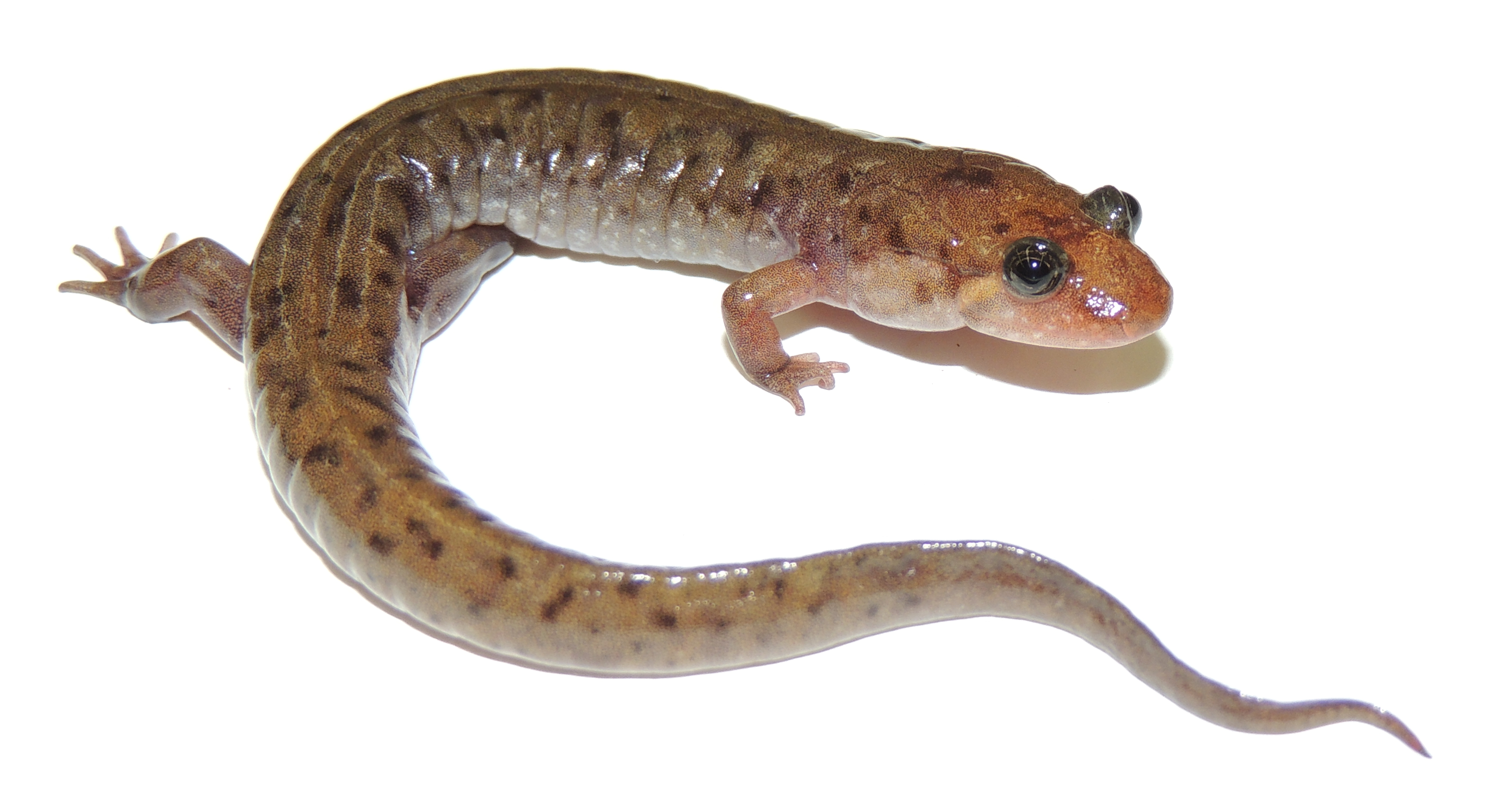

Conservation status
- Least Concern (IUCN 3.1)

Scientific classification
- Kingdom: Animalia
- Phylum: Chordata
- Class: Amphibia
- Order: Urodela
- Family: Plethodontidae
- Genus: Desmognathus
- Species: D. monticola

Binomial name
- Desmognathus monticola Dunn, 1916

Synonyms
- Desmognathus monticola jeffersoni Hoffman, 1951; Desmognathus monticola monticola – Hoffman, 1951; Desmognathus phoca — Dunn, 1923; currently synonym of Desmognathus fuscus

= Seal salamander =

Species of amphibian endemic to the Eastern United States

The seal salamander (Desmognathus monticola) is a species of lungless salamander that is endemic to the Eastern United States.

== Distribution and habitat ==
The seal salamander can be found from southwestern Pennsylvania and south through Appalachian Mountains areas of high elevation in West Virginia, western Maryland, western and northern Virginia, eastern Kentucky, western North Carolina, eastern Tennessee, western South Carolina, and northern Georgia to central Alabama. There are also disjunctive populations in southern Alabama as well as at the very western end of the Florida panhandle. In the north of its range, it has not been observed north or west of the Ohio River.

An introduced population is present in Benton County, Arkansas. This population was first found in 2003 and occurs at higher densities than first thought. This is a possible conservation concern for the native ecosystem.

Its habitat includes rocky mountain streams, spring-fed brooks in the ravines of deciduous forests, muddy sections of streams and seepages. The total adult population size of the species is assumed to exceed 100,000.

== Etymology ==
The genus name Desmognathus refers to the characteristic bundle of ligaments that connect to the jaw in this species group. The comes from the Greek words desmos, which means "ligament," and gnathos which means "jaw". The specific epithet monticola comes from Latin and means "mountaineer" or "highlander," in reference to the high-elevations where this species is commonly found.
