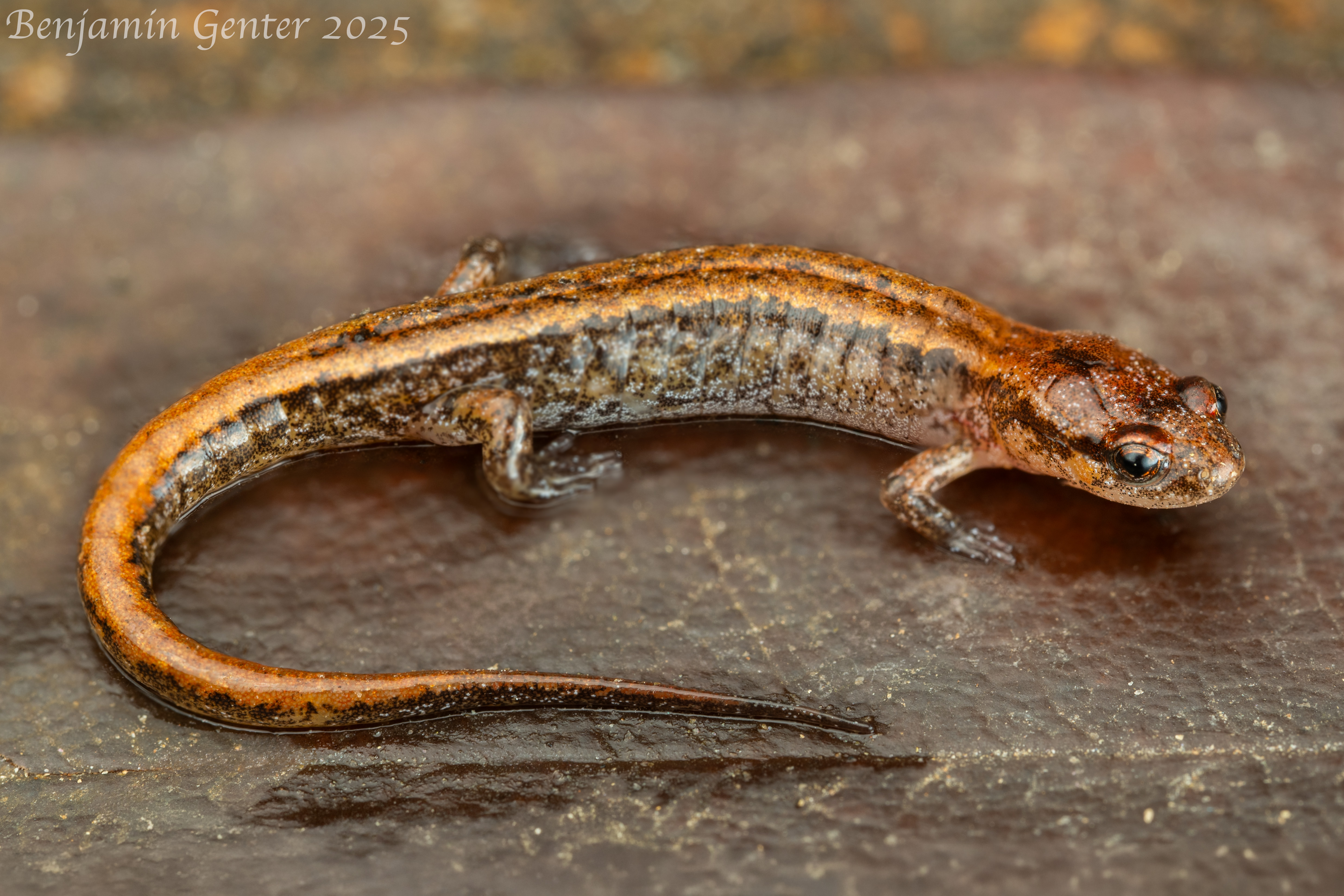

Conservation status
- Near Threatened (IUCN 3.1)

Scientific classification
- Kingdom: Animalia
- Phylum: Chordata
- Class: Amphibia
- Order: Urodela
- Family: Plethodontidae
- Genus: Desmognathus
- Species: D. aeneus

Binomial name
- Desmognathus aeneus Brown & Bishop, 1947

= Seepage salamander =

Species of amphibian

The seepage salamander (Desmognathus aeneus) is a small, terrestrial species of salamander in the family Plethodontidae. It is endemic to the United States. They are found in small areas of Tennessee, North Carolina, Georgia, and Alabama. Its natural habitats are temperate forests, intermittent rivers, and freshwater springs. It gets its name from the seepages around which it lives. It is very similar in its appearance and life history to the pygmy salamander (Desmognathus wrighti). These two species differ greatly from the other Desmognathus species. They are the smallest salamanders in the genus, measuring only 3–5 cm (1–2 in) in length. They are also the only two terrestrial, direct-developing Desmognathus species. However, the two species are not often seen to coexist, differing in distribution by elevation, although there are exceptions. The seepage salamander is currently listed as Near Threatened, with its numbers declining in most of states in which it is found. It is threatened by habitat loss, with logging having a major effect.

== Description ==
The seepage salamander is a very small and slender salamander, ranging from 4.4–5.7 cm (1.75–2.25 in). The adults possess vomerine teeth. The tail is terete and rounded. The seepage salamander has a pale dorsal stripe, with a wide, wavy to almost straight shape, and ranging in color from yellow or tan to reddish brown. The stripe is sometimes flecked with a darker pigment. A mid-dorsal, dark line is also seen and is continuous with a Y-shaped mark on the head. There is a dark brown band on the sides, fading towards the belly. The underbelly is pale and is mottled with brown and white, but it may also be plain, with no other coloration.

The seepage salamander is easily confused with the Pygmy Salamander (Desmognathus wrighti). These two species overlap in a small area of southern North Carolina. D. wrighti and D. aeneus are the smallest species in the genus Desmognathus and are the only terrestrial direct-developers, lacking a free-swimming larval stage. They both have vomerine teeth, and similar tail length to total body length ratios; however, they have different patterns and coloration. Seepage salamanders have a smoother top of the head. The mental glands are also shaped differently in the males. The pygmy salamander has a large, U-shaped mental gland, while the seepage salamander's is small and kidney shaped.

== General description and taxonomy ==
The seepage salamander is part of the genus Desmognathus and the family Plethodontidae. Like all other plethodontids, the seepage salamander is lungless and respires through its skin and the lining of its mouth. They also have a naso-labial groove and a relatively immoveable lower jaw, which allows them to force their way under objects. As with all species in Desmognathus, they have a pale line running diagonally from the eye to the angle of the jaw. This line may be hard to see in older, darker adults. Their hind legs are larger and stouter than the forelegs. Their body is short and stout, and they are good jumpers, often used as an escape.

According to the phylogenetic tree, the seepage salamander branched deep within the tree of the Desmognathus species. D. aeneus is a sister group to all species of Desmognathus except D. wrighti, which is an outgroup. D. aeneus and D. wrighti have distinct character differences from the rest of the Desmognathus species. They are the smallest species, direct-developers, and the most terrestrial, with all other species being semi-aquatic or aquatic. Since these two species branch the earliest, evolution has moved toward larger body size, lengthened larval periods, and more aquatic habitats within Desmognathus.

== Geographic distribution ==
Seepage salamanders get their name from the seepage areas where they are often found. However, they are also found near streams and under leaf litter, leaf mold, and rotten logs. They are a terrestrial species.

Seepage salamanders are distributed in southeast Tennessee, southwest North Carolina, northern Georgia, and central to northern Alabama. They are found in Monroe and Polk counties in Tennessee; Fannin, Pickens, Towns, and Union counties in Georgia; Oconee County in South Carolina; and Cherokee, Clay, Graham, Macon, and Swain counties in North Carolina. In Alabama, they can be found in Calhoun, Clay, Cleburne, and Tallapoosa counties. They also might be found in Cherokee, Chilton, Etowah, Hale, and Tuscaloosa counties in Alabama, but may be extirpated from these locales.

Populations have a disjunct distribution and are highly localized. There is an isolated colony in western Alabama, and one in northeastern Georgia. Populations are found at elevations ranging from 210–1,370 m (700–4,500 ft). However, in the colony in northeastern Georgia they can be found as low as 30 m (100 ft).

== Ecology ==
The seepage salamander does not experience much competition from other species of salamanders due to its habitat. Because it is a terrestrial salamander, it is not disturbed by the semi-aquatic and aquatic salamanders. Almost all other Desmognathus species are found at closer distances to streams. The lack of competition also may be due to the fact that it is very secretive. It is seldom seen on the surface, which may be an anti-predatory response.

The only species of Desmognathus which would be found in the same habitat as the seepage salamander and create competitive pressure is the pygmy salamander (D. wrighti). However, the ranges of the two species rarely overlap. The pygmy salamander is found at higher elevations, while the seepage salamander is found at lower ones. The pygmy salamander is found on the border of North Carolina and Tennessee. The distribution range of the seepage salamander begins just below the pygmy salamander's range. However, there have been cases where the two species are found together. It has been observed that they coexist in Monroe County, Tennessee and it is possible that they coexist in Blount County, Tennessee. Further studies are needed to determine their interactions and would aid in conservation efforts.

== Life history and behavior ==
Seepage salamanders are rarely seen on the surface even at night, despite being nocturnal. The food sources consist mainly of arthropods, especially insect larvae and springtails. Mites, spiders, earthworms, crustaceans, nematodes, myriapods, and snails have also been found to be eaten by seepage salamanders.

=== Life history ===
The seepage salamander is terrestrial and develops directly into juveniles, skipping the aquatic, larval stage. The length of time between fertilization and hatching is 68–75 days. When eggs hatch, the juveniles clearly resemble the adults.

Oviposition occurs in April and May, with all eggs ready for deposition by the female being laid. The eggs hatch in the late spring and summer. There have been some discrepancies about how long it takes for the eggs to hatch. Both males and females reach sexual maturation after two years. Harrison (1967) found that eggs hatched in 43–45 days, but Marks and Collazo found 68–75 days. This may be due to different incubation temperatures, but the difference has not been fully explored.

=== Courtship ===
There is little diversity within Plethodontidae in regard to mating. The mating process consists of courting behavior, the tail straddling walk, sperm deposition in the form of a spermatophore, and insemination. However, the seepage salamander differs in its courtship behavior.

As with all other plethodontids, pheromones are secreted by males and are used during the courtship process. Most species use a pulling or snapping behavior. However, only D. aeneus and D. wrighti use biting as a delivery mechanism. These two species physically and directly restrain the females and bite them. The bites can last up to several hours. Then they release pheromones into the bite wounds. Other plethodontids do not directly restrain the females when excreting pheromones.

== Conservation ==
The seepage salamander is classified as Near Threatened by the IUCN because its range is not greater than 20,000 km^{2} and its habitat and population size are decreasing. The isolation of the different populations also increases susceptibility to declines. Seepage salamanders are on the verge of becoming classified as Vulnerable.

The species is in decline in Alabama and North Carolina, but is stable in South Carolina. It is listed as in need of management in Tennessee.

Logging is a main source of decline within the species, particularly in Alabama. Around half of the populations known in 1976 are now extinct. Other forestry practices, like clear cutting, also threaten seepage salamanders.

Most populations of seepage salamanders do not occur within protected areas. Therefore, to decrease vulnerability of populations to certain forestry practices, buffers should be set up in susceptible areas around seepages and streams.
