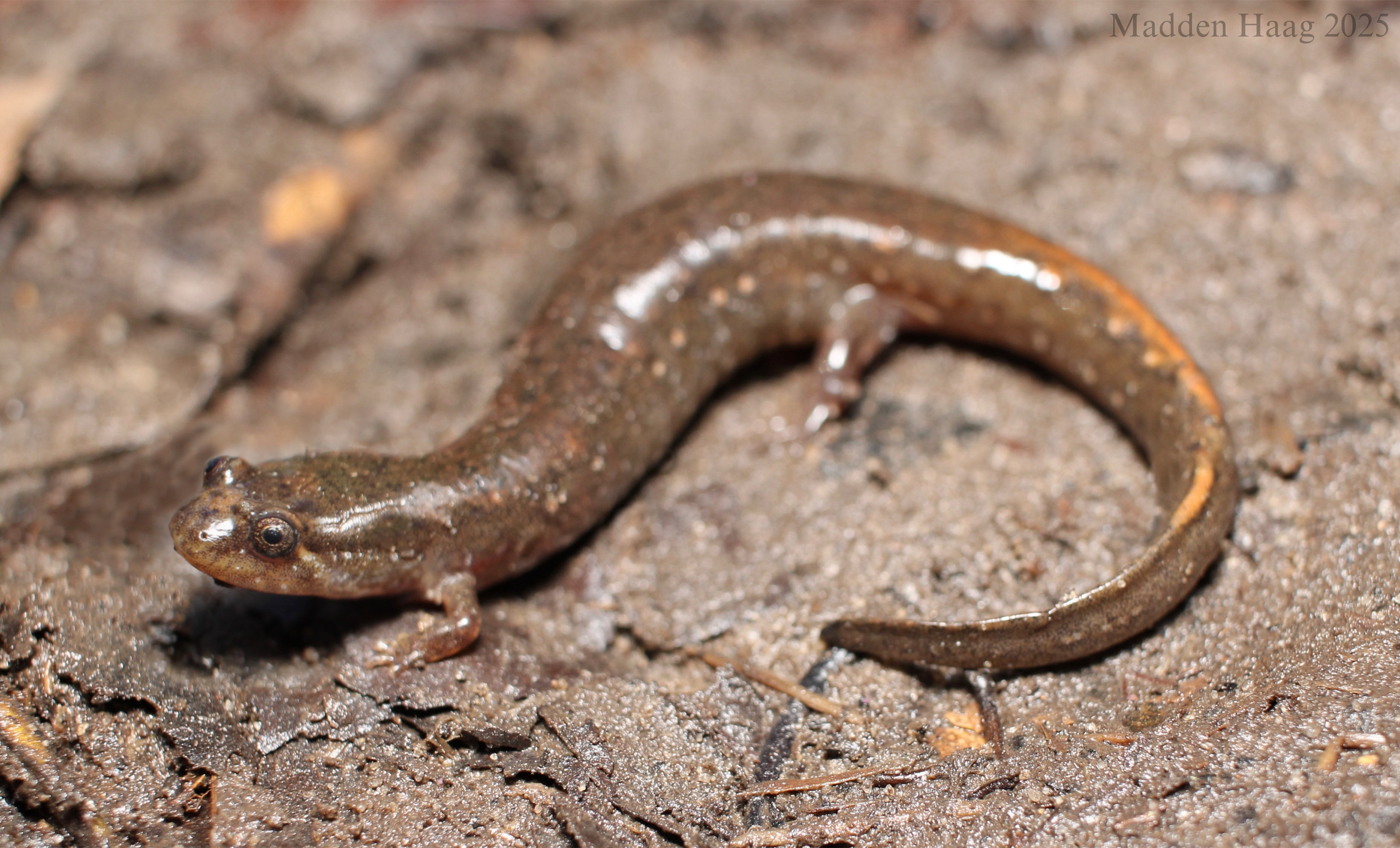
- Valentine's southern dusky salamander (Desmognathus valentinei)

Conservation status
- Least Concern (IUCN 3.1)

Scientific classification
- Kingdom: Animalia
- Phylum: Chordata
- Class: Amphibia
- Order: Urodela
- Family: Plethodontidae
- Genus: Desmognathus
- Species: D. valentinei

Binomial name
- Desmognathus valentinei Means, Lamb & Bernardo, 2017

= Valentine's southern dusky salamander =

Species of salamander

Valentine's southern dusky salamander (Desmognathus valentinei) is a species of salamander in the family Plethodontidae. It is endemic to the southeastern United States.

== Taxonomy ==
It was previously thought to be a population of Holbrook's southern dusky salamander (D. holbrooki), with both species being grouped together as the southern dusky salamander. However, a 2008 study found D. holbrooki as previously defined to be polyphyletic and containing multiple undescribed species. One of these undescribed species was formally described in 2017 as D. valentinei. It is named in honor of Barry D. Valentine, a biologist and former faculty emeritus at Ohio State University, who had first suggested the distinctiveness of this taxon in the early 1960s.

== Distribution ==
It is found in the Gulf Coast region, where it ranges from the Mobile Bay region of Alabama west through the southern half of Mississippi to eastern Louisiana.

== Description ==
Despite its close resemblance to D. holbrooki, it has some morphological differences. It has a larger body structure than D. holbrooki and has undistinguished dorsal markings instead of the crisply defined blotches on other Desmognathus species. They also differ in aspects of the skull, and the tails of D. valentinei have a bladelike shape instead of narrowing to a tip.
