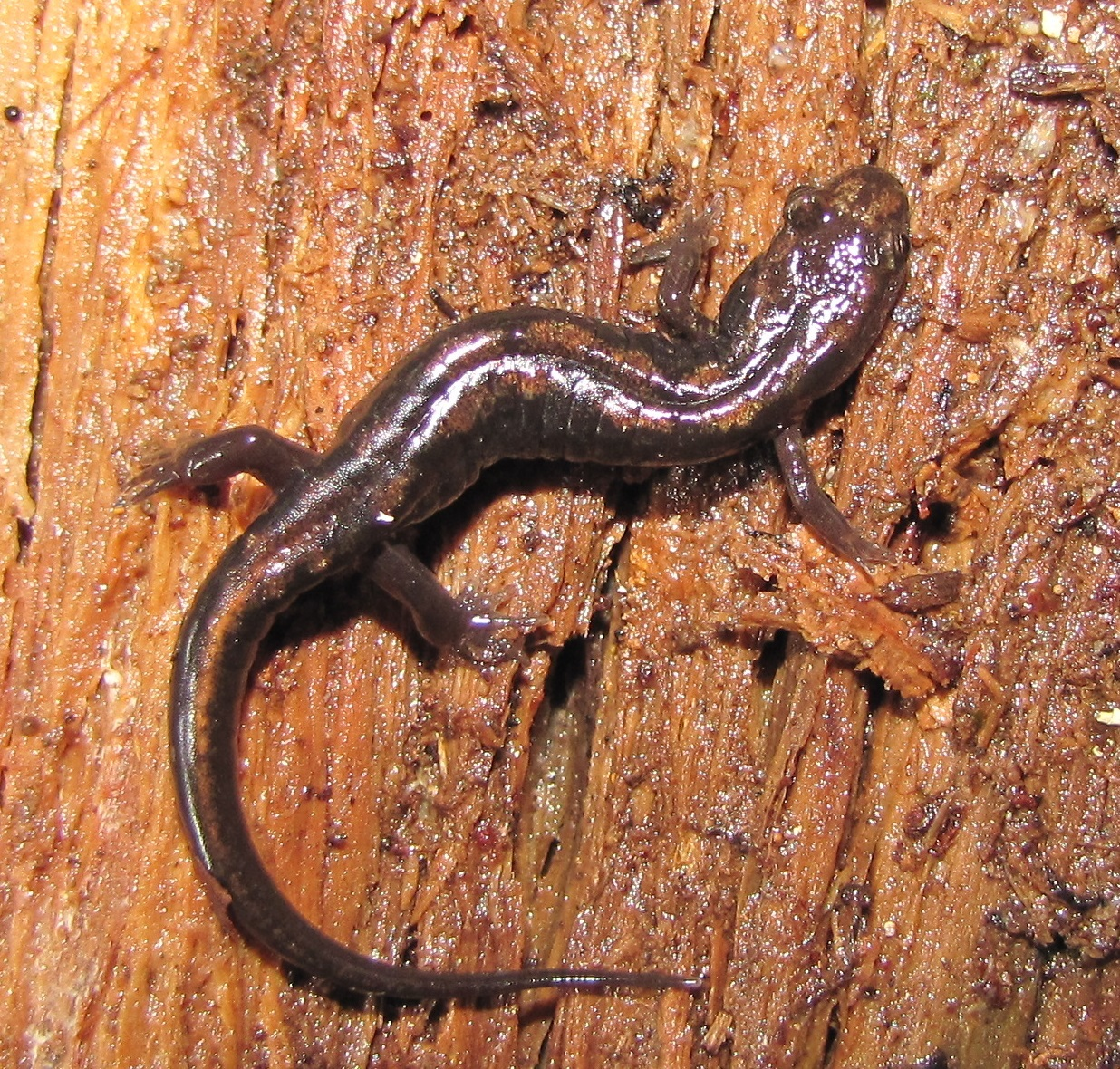

Conservation status
- Least Concern (IUCN 3.1)

Scientific classification
- Kingdom: Animalia
- Phylum: Chordata
- Class: Amphibia
- Order: Urodela
- Family: Plethodontidae
- Genus: Desmognathus
- Species: D. carolinensis

Binomial name
- Desmognathus carolinensis Dunn, 1916

= Carolina mountain dusky salamander =

Species of amphibian

The Carolina mountain dusky salamander (Desmognathus carolinensis) is a species of salamander in the family Plethodontidae.

== Distribution ==
The species is endemic to the Appalachian Mountains within North Carolina in the south-eastern United States. Subranges it is found in include the Blue Ridge Mountains.

Its natural habitats are temperate forests, rivers, intermittent rivers, freshwater springs, and rocky areas.

It is threatened by habitat loss.
