= Blue Ridge dusky salamander =

Conservation status
- Least Concern (IUCN 3.1)

Scientific classification
- Kingdom: Animalia
- Phylum: Chordata
- Class: Amphibia
- Order: Urodela
- Family: Plethodontidae
- Genus: Desmognathus
- Species: D. orestes

Binomial name
- Desmognathus orestes Tilley & Mahoney, 1996

Species of amphibian

The Blue Ridge dusky salamander (Desmognathus orestes) is a species of salamander in the family Plethodontidae.

== Distribution ==
The species is endemic to the Blue Ridge Mountains range of the southern Appalachian Mountains, within western Virginia and North Carolina in the south-eastern United States.

Its natural habitats are temperate forests, rivers, intermittent rivers, freshwater springs, and rocky areas.

It is threatened by habitat loss.

== Description ==
Their eggs are laid under logs or rocks.
