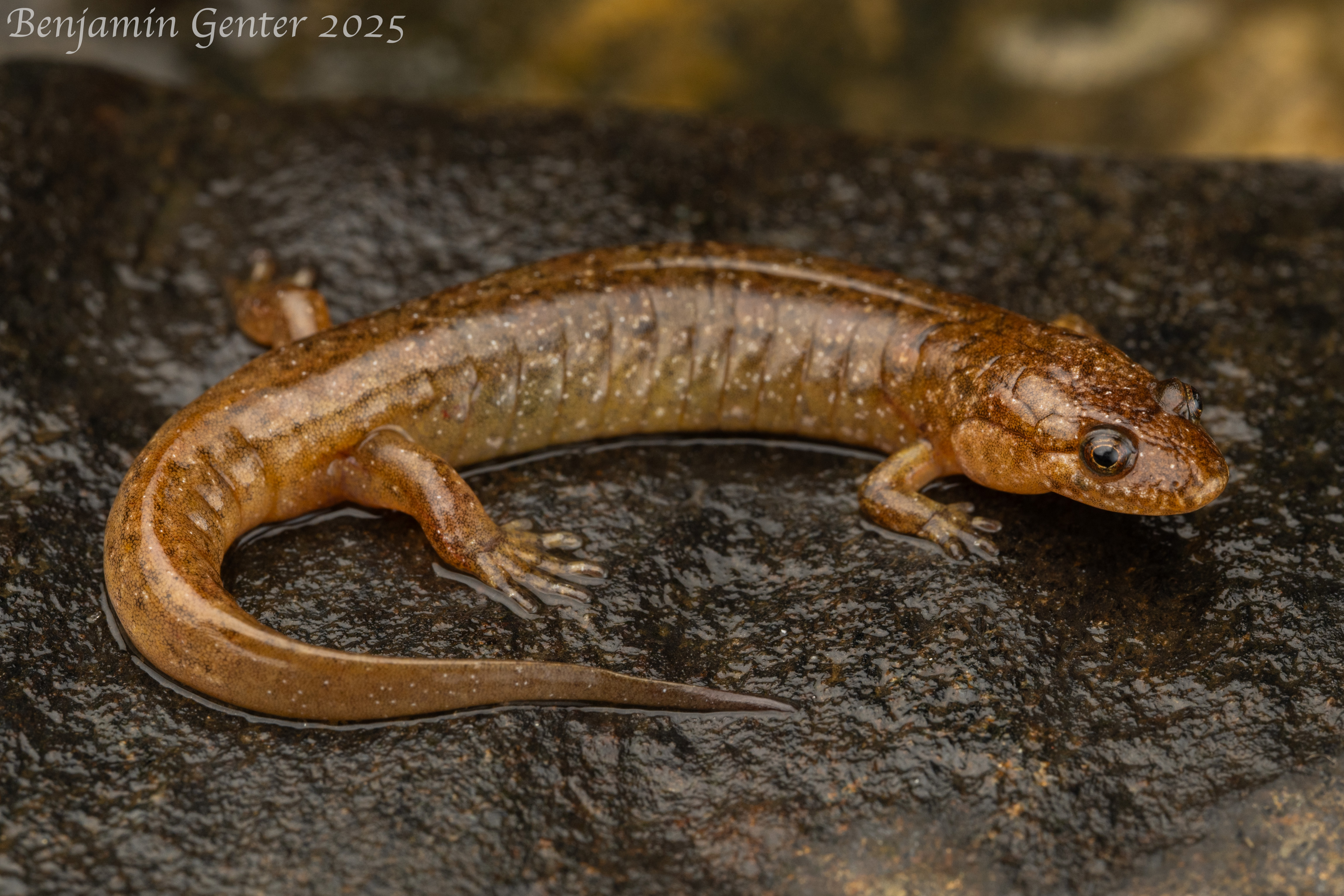

Conservation status
- Near Threatened (IUCN 3.1)

Scientific classification
- Kingdom: Animalia
- Phylum: Chordata
- Class: Amphibia
- Order: Urodela
- Family: Plethodontidae
- Genus: Desmognathus
- Species: D. santeetlah

Binomial name
- Desmognathus santeetlah Tilley, 1981

= Santeetlah dusky salamander =

Species of amphibian

The Santeetlah dusky salamander (Desmognathus santeetlah) is a species of salamander in the family Plethodontidae. It is endemic to the United States.

Its natural habitats are rivers, intermittent rivers, and freshwater springs. It is threatened by habitat loss.
