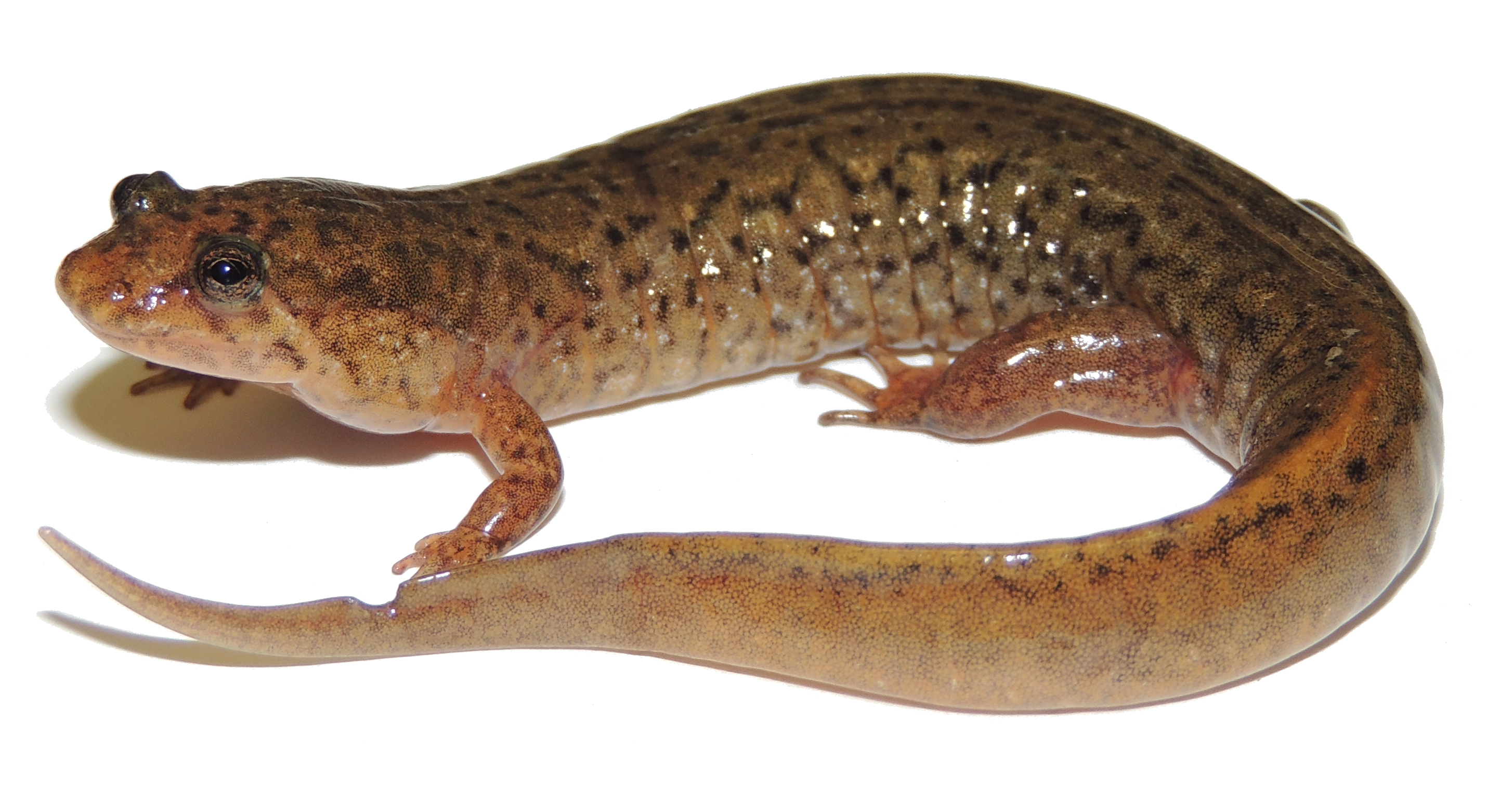

Conservation status
- Least Concern (IUCN 3.1)

Scientific classification
- Kingdom: Animalia
- Phylum: Chordata
- Class: Amphibia
- Order: Urodela
- Family: Plethodontidae
- Genus: Desmognathus
- Species: D. fuscus

Binomial name
- Desmognathus fuscus (Rafinesque, 1820)
- Range of D. fuscus

Synonyms
- Salamandra fusca Green, 1818 (nomen dubium); Salamandra nigra Green, 1818 (nomen dubium); Salamandra sinciput-albida Green, 1818 (nomen dubium); Triturus fuscus Rafinesque, 1820; Salamandra picta Harlan, 1825; Salamandra intermixta Green, 1825; Salamandra frontalis Gray, 1831; Molge brunnea A.M.C. Duméril, Bibron & A.H.A. Duméril, 1854; Molge arenatus A.M.C. Duméril, Bibron & A.H.A. Duméril, 1854; Salamandra phoca Matthes, 1855

= Desmognathus fuscus =

Species of amphibian

Desmognathus fuscus is a species of amphibian in the family Plethodontidae (lungless salamanders). The species is commonly called the dusky salamander or northern dusky salamander to distinguish it from populations in the southern United States which form several distinct species, the southern dusky salamanders (D. auriculatus, D. valentinei). The northern dusky salamander is the most widespread representative of its genus in Canada. It can be found in eastern North America from extreme eastern Canada in New Brunswick south to South Carolina. The size of the species' total population is unknown, but is assumed to easily exceed 100,000. The species' habitat differs somewhat geographically; dusky salamanders in the northern part of the range prefer rocky woodland streams, seepages, and springs, while those in the south favor floodplains, sloughs, and muddy places along upland streams. They are most common where water is running or trickling. They hide under various objects, such as leaves or rocks, either in or near water. Alternatively, they may enter burrows for protection. The dusky salamander lays its eggs close to water under moss or rocks, in logs, or in stream-bank cavities. The larval stage which follows is normally aquatic.

== Taxonomy ==
The holotype for Desmognathus fuscus does not exist; Rafinesque (1820) described the type locality to be in the northern parts of the state of New York in small brooks. The spotted dusky salamander (D. conanti) and the flat-headed salamander (D. planiceps) were described in the 1950s but were later thought to be synonymous with the northern dusky salamander, but further studies have found all of them to be distinct species from one another.

== Description ==
A small but sturdy salamander, the upper body of the northern dusky salamander varies in colour from reddish-brown to gray or olive, with a white or grey underside. The body is sparsely covered with dark spots or mottling concentrated on the sides. It also has a light dorsal stripe or two dark stripes that continue on to the first part of the tail. Juvenile colouring consists of five to eight pairs of dorsal spots or blotches located between the front and hind legs. Older individuals tend to be uniformly dark brown or black. As with all dusky salamander species, both juveniles and adults have a pale single stripe outlined in black that extends from the eye and runs diagonally to the rear of the jaw. Additionally, both have 14 costal grooves, larger hind limbs than forelimbs, and a keeled (knife-like) tail that is triangular in cross-section and compressed laterally at the base. The tail is less than half its body length and is normally lighter in colour in comparison to the body. Adults attain lengths of up to 14 cm, with the average length of adult males and females being 9.4 cm and 8.6 cm, respectively. Being from the family Plethodontidae, the northern dusky salamander is lungless. It absorbs oxygen through the skin and membranous tissue located in the mouth and throat. The dusky salamander also has a naso-labial groove, which aids olfaction, and thus the ability to search out mates and prey through smell.

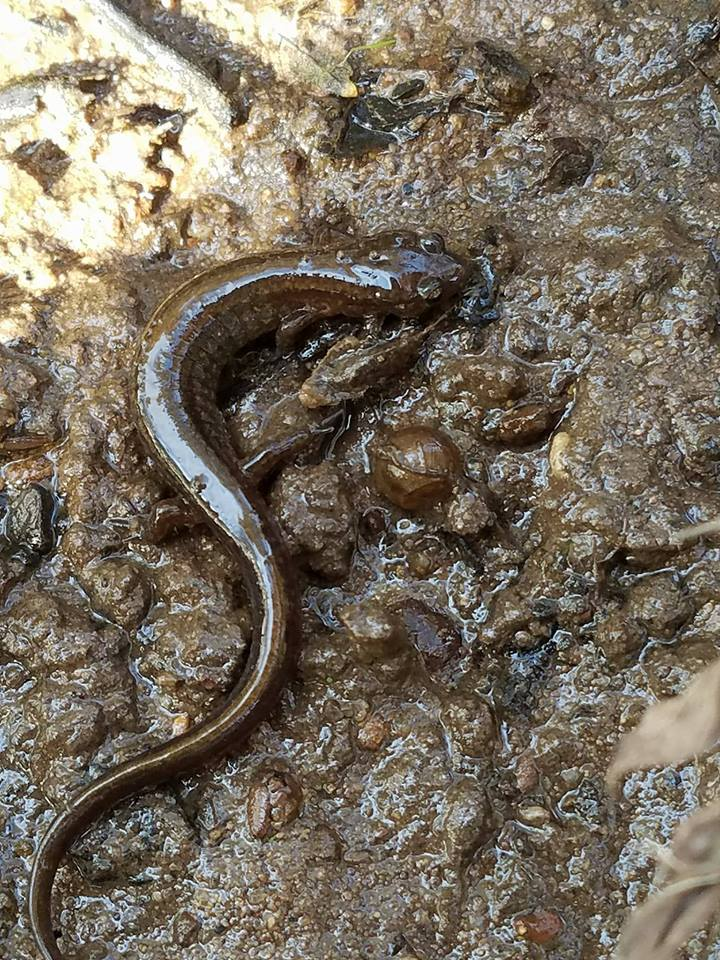
A northern dusky salamander in mud.

=== Similar species ===
The dusky salamander is similar in appearance to and thus often confused with the Allegheny Mountain dusky salamander (Desmognathus ochrophaeus). Distinguishing characteristics are that the dorsal spots of the Mountain dusky salamander are usually chevron-shaped and its tail rounded at the base rather than laterally compressed. Additionally, hybridization has been known to occur between the Allegheny Mountain dusky salamander and the northern dusky salamander.

The northern dusky salamander can also be differentiated from other lungless salamanders including the eastern red-backed, the northern two-lined and the four-toed. They have a distinguishing pale-coloured line that runs from behind their eyes to the rear of the jaw, and heavier set bodies with longer hind legs than front legs.

== Range ==
This species is native to North America, and occurs throughout central-eastern regions of Canada and the United States, from southern New Brunswick, southeastern Quebec and southern Ontario south to South Carolina. Populations south of this range are now thought to belong to other, previously-synonymized species such as D. conanti. The Canadian distribution accounts for approximately 5% of the global range. Within its Canadian range, the northern dusky salamander usually occurs in forested habitat located in high elevation, low-order streams. There are two separate units (DU), the Quebec/New Brunswick DU and the Carolinian DU in Ontario. A comprehensive review of Ohio populations was published in "Amphibians of Ohio" (2013). An isolated breeding population exists in eastern Michigan; however, it is not known whether this population is natural or was introduced.

== Habitat ==
In the northern extent of their range, the northern dusky salamander inhabits saturated soil near springs, seepages, and small tributaries of small headwater streams otherwise known as the riparian zone. Habitat quality is optimal in undisturbed watersheds and where water is running or trickling and there is an abundance of forest cover The forest cover serves to keep the water cool and well oxygenated, and maintains moisture and temperature at levels necessary for salamander survival. In the south, the northern dusky salamander can be found in upland streams as well as floodplains, sloughs and muddy sites.

== Predation ==
Northern Dusky Salamanders are an important food source for many species. They are preyed on by among others, the Eastern Garter Snake. Tail autonomy is a defense against predation The species uses subterranean retreats or burrows near the streams edge as well as leaf litter, logs, rocks and moss as a source of protective cover for avoiding desiccation and predators. These microhabitats are also important for foraging and nesting both of which take place on land close to the water's edge. As a result of desiccation and predators, activity of the northern dusky salamander peaks in the morning, and the evening and early night. Alongside the stream, females nest in cryptic microhabitats where soil is saturated with water. Their eggs are often laid in logs, under rocks or moss, or stream-bank cavities. During development while in the larval stage, the northern dusky salamander is strictly aquatic, its habitat the interstitial spaces between rocks of the streambed. In winter, they remain in shallow running water, whereas adults overwinter in subterranean retreats or in streams, often remaining active throughout winter if the substrate doesn't freeze.

As a relatively small amphibian, the northern dusky salamander spends most of its life in hiding. If predated it is capable of autotomy along any point of its tail, but lacks chemical defense mechanisms against its main predators which include larger salamanders, birds, fish, snakes, crayfish, and small mammals.

The home range of the northern dusky salamander is limited to 1m^{2} to 3.6 m^{2}. The northern dusky salamander has seasonal variations with its patterns of movement. During warmer months the salamanders have larger home ranges that average around 1.5 m2. This is reduced during the winter and some populations move into specific areas for condensed winter retreats.

== Reproduction and development ==
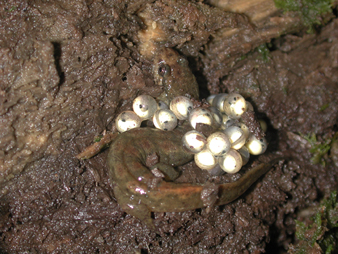
dusky salamander with eggs in Page County, Virginia

Due to their lack of mobility, some populations of dusky salamander are genetically distinct. Breeding is terrestrial and occurs annually in spring or fall and includes elaborate courtship rituals. Adult males have papillose cloacal lips and a small mental gland. These glandular tissues become enlarged when sexually active. Female individuals lack a mental gland and have folded cloacal lips. For reproduction, the male applies the snout, cheeks and mental gland to the snout of the female, who usually responds by picking up the spermatophore. Fecundity increases with body size.

Females normally deposit between 10 and 30 eggs under logs, moss or rocks located streamside where soil is saturated with water. Clutch size has been known to vary geographically and can be as large as forty-five, or as few as eight. Females remain with their eggs for an incubation period of six to ten weeks (45 to 60 days) in order to protect them from desiccation and predation . The larvae are predominantly aquatic and approximately 1.5 cm in length upon hatching. The larvae then metamorphose into semi-terrestrial adults, with juvenile salamanders being 2.8 to 4.4 cm in length. Their biphasic life cycle includes an aquatic state of seven to 16 months, followed by a semi-terrestrial adult stage. The northern dusky salamander attains sexual maturity at approximately three to four years of age. Life expectancy is 10 to 15 years.

== Feeding ==
The northern dusky salamander is considered to be a feeding generalist, with its diet varying based on food availability. Stream salamanders are known to be significant predators. This is because they are dominant vertebrates within headwater riparian forest ecosystems, with a biomass greater than that reported for fish, birds or small mammals. The species is carnivorous and consumes a variety of aquatic and terrestrial invertebrates. Larvae feed predominantly on aquatic invertebrates (such as copepods, other crustaceans and insect larvae), as well as mites, whereas the adult diet consists of 60 to 85% of terrestrial invertebrates, including arthropods (such as crustaceans, spiders, mites, flies and fly larvae, ants, beetles and beetle larvae, centipedes, moths and mayflies), snails, slugs and earthworms. When prey is in excess, the northern dusky salamander does typically have a preference for the larger and fleshier terrestrial invertebrates, such as earthworms. The aquatic portion of the adult's diet is habitat specific and commensurate with the seasonal abundance and diversity of invertebrates.

== Conservation ==
=== Population and trends ===
Current data does not allow an accurate estimate of population size or trends. That said, the total adult population size of the northern dusky salamander is known to exceed 100,000 individuals. There are numerous stable populations throughout the range. The species is widespread in Quebec and New Brunswick but local densities are usually low. In Ontario, the species is rare with a population size estimated at fewer than 250 individuals.

=== Threats and limiting factors ===
The northern dusky salamander is extremely vulnerable to desiccation and therefore reliant on clean headwater streams. Resultantly, contamination of ground water or waterways through pollution from urban areas, industry, or agriculture, can be catastrophic to local populations. The disappearance of the species from the Acadia National Park in Maine is believed to be the result of heavy metal contamination. Freshwater stream acidification also poses a significant threat with 40% of streams in the southern Appalachians showing signs of acidification.

Changes to stream flow or the groundwater supply, can have significant impacts on local salamander genetics and populations vis-à-vis loss of suitable aquatic or terrestrial habitat, bank instability from excessive runoff, or simply changes to the moisture in the terrestrial habitat. Such changes can be naturally occurring or artificially induced (e.g. discharged water volumes). The activities of forestry can be similarly devastating. Timber harvesting, wind farms and watershed urbanization reduce water supply, water quality and microhabitat availability. Aquatic habitat can be degraded through siltation of streams, or the microhabitat conditions of the forest floor undergoing alterations. Siltation is of particular consequence to the northern dusky salamander because the interstitial spaces that they use for foraging, nesting and overwintering are lost. Urbanization has resulted in the disappearance of the species in Mount Saint-Hellaire National Park in Quebec, as well as other areas. Vulnerability to extirpation is further heightened when the species relies on a single watershed. Such is the case of the Ontario population of the northern dusky salamander. The species is also threatened through the introduction of predatory fish, such as Brook Trout.

=== Conservation status ===
The northern dusky salamander is listed as endangered in Ontario and is declining in many parts of the United States yet some populations remain stable. The International Union for Conservation of Nature (IUCN) lists its global status as Least Concern.

In the province of Ontario, where the status of the Carolinian population of the northern dusky salamander is listed as Endangered, the northern dusky salamander is protected under the Ontario Endangered Species Act of 2007 and by the Ontario Fish and Wildlife Conservation Act. These acts protect its habitat and make it illegal to possess, harm or kill the species. In Ontario, a dusky salamander recovery team entitled the "Allegheny Mountain Dusky Salamander and Northern Dusky Salamander Recovery Strategy" has also been established to develop a recovery plan for both species. The Quebec / New Brunswick population of the northern dusky salamander is considered not at risk. Nonetheless, it is currently on a list of species likely to be designated as threatened or vulnerable by the Quebec provincial government and is also protected by a provincial act that prohibits the collecting or selling of specimens. Likewise, Article 22 of the provincial Environmental Quality Act offers protection against unregulated degradation of the dusky salamander's environment. In New Brunswick, the species is designated as Sensitive under the General Status of Species in Canada. Protection is offered the species by the New Brunswick Fish and Wildlife Act.
