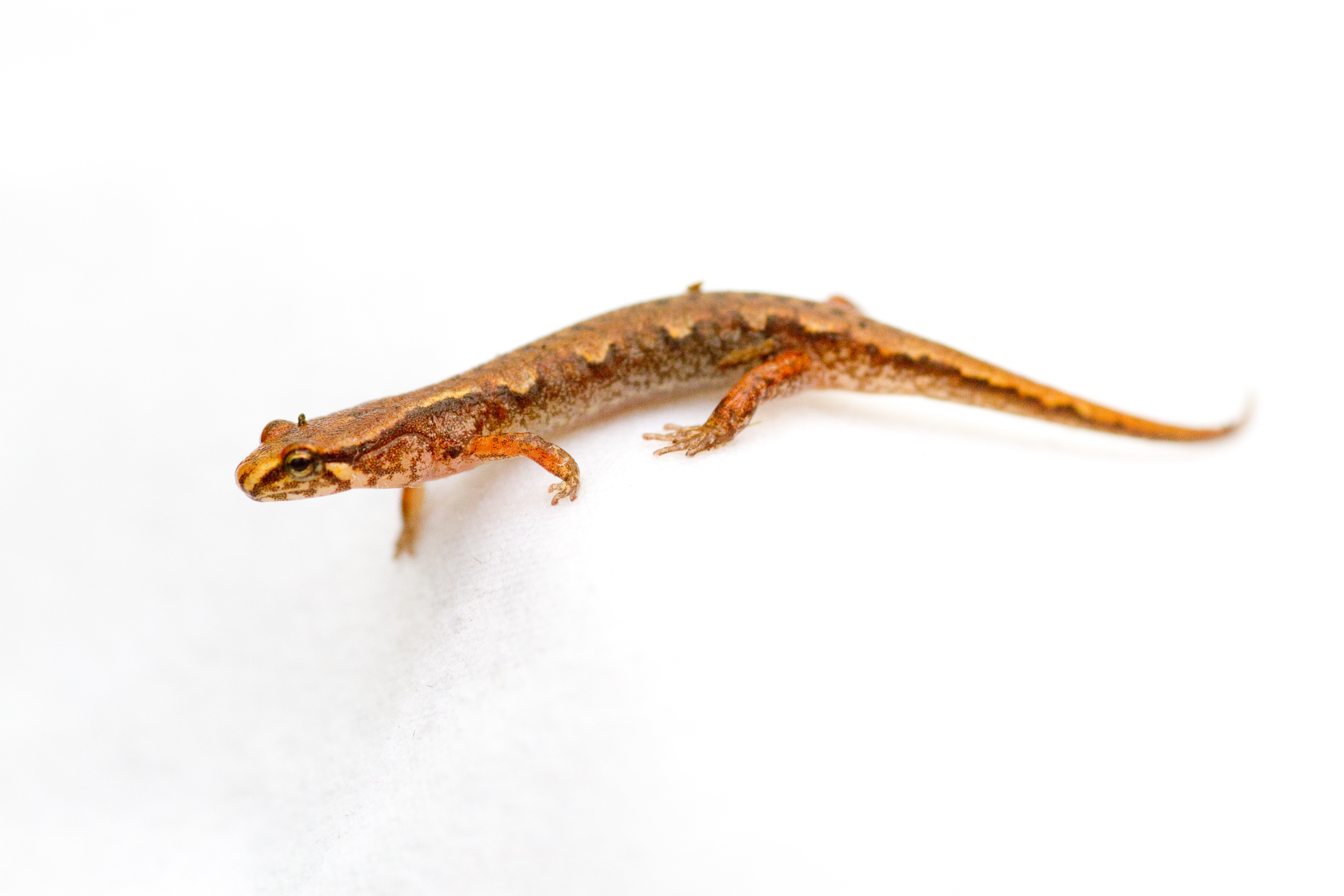

Conservation status
- Least Concern (IUCN 3.1)

Scientific classification
- Kingdom: Animalia
- Phylum: Chordata
- Class: Amphibia
- Order: Urodela
- Family: Plethodontidae
- Genus: Desmognathus
- Species: D. wrighti

Binomial name
- Desmognathus wrighti King, 1936

= Pygmy salamander =

King Pygmy salamander

Species of amphibian

The pygmy salamander (Desmognathus wrighti) is a species of salamander in the family Plethodontidae. It is endemic to the United States in the southern Appalachians in North Carolina and Tennessee. Desmognathus wrighti is a member of the family Plethodontidae and is commonly known as the pygmy salamander. As the name suggest the pygmy salamander is the smallest of the nineteen species in the genus Desmognathus. D. wrighti undergoes direct development and does not have a free-living larval stage. Only two other taxa in Desmognathus, D. aeneus and D. organi, exhibit direct development along with the pygmy salamander. In the genus Desmognathus, body size, habitat preferences, and patterns used by males during courtship are quite variable. D. wrighti courtship is noted by the male biting and seizing its partner in order to provide them with a chemical stimulus. The pygmy salamander can be found in the southern Appalachians of the United States in western North Carolina and eastern Tennessee. Geographical distribution of the Desmognathus wrighti is fragmented and the highest abundance of the species can be found at high elevations in spruce and fir tree forest.

== Identification ==
Desmognathus wrighti has a light belly with a gold-colored iridophore pattern that extends from the abdomen to the anterior of the cloacal vent. The salamander has a rounder snout and the total body length ranges from 35–44 mm (1.4–1.7 in). The tail is not keeled and the body length is equal to or greater than the tail length. Pygmy salamanders are typically light brown with dark brown pigment on the dorsal side forming an inverted V-shape marking down the back This 'V' shape marking is a classic pigmentation marking. The salamander's color can range from brick red to yellow but usually is found as a light brown shade. The light stripe from the eye to the jaw designates the salamanders as a desmognathan. Desmognathus wrighti typically has six vomerine teeth on each side of the mouth along with premaxillary and mandible teeth. The maximum size of males and females has been determined to have no real difference in the species.

== General description and taxonomy ==
Desmognathus wrighti was named and discovered by King in 1936. The pygmy salamander's natural habitat includes temperate forests, intermittent rivers, and freshwater springs. This species small size places it among the smallest salamanders in the world. D. wrighti adult size is in the range of the sizes of the genus Thorius, which are neo-tropical and considered the smallest urodeles in the world. The genus Desmognathus consists of nineteen species which all vary in body size, life history, and habitat. The most basic way of sorting the species in this genus is by body size and distance they are found from streams which they inhabit.

In 2010, there was a taxonomic revision to Desmognathus wrighti. This revision was based on genetic and ecological analyses. This divergence has been reported by DNA sequencing, but further research shows several differences in the body type and ventral pigmentation. An ecological niche analysis was completed on two niches separated by the French Broad River and significant morphological variation was found between the two lineages. Findings show differences in snout-vent length, body condition, and head width, suggesting that there are two distinct and separately evolving lineages in Desmognathus wrighti. The diverging northern lineage, Desmognathus organi, is the new species described by Crespi and Browne in 2010. The revision to the taxonomic Desmognathus wrighti was seen needed for the northern pygmy salamander to reflect the genetic, ecological, and geographical differences in the two different populations located north and south of the French Broad River. The original species Desmognathus wrighti described by King more accurately describes the lineage from the southern part of the French Broad River and the morphological descriptions described on this page. The new species Desmognathus organi, the Northern pygmy salamander, is a sister taxon to D. wrighti. Differences of D. organi from its sister taxon includes a slightly larger body length, wider heads, and the ventral gold iridophore patterns are absent. Also, D. organi is found in higher elevations north of the French Broad River including Tennessee, North Carolina, and Virginia.

== Geographical distribution ==
Desmognathus wrighti has a very fragmented geographical distribution. The species is found in the Southern Appalachian Mountains of North Carolina and Tennessee south of the French Broad River. In Tennessee, D. wrighti inhabits the Great Smoky Mountains National Park in Blount, Cocke, and Sevier counties. The species is also found in the Cherokee National Forest in Monroe County. In North Carolina, the pygmy salamander is only documented in Graham County along the Tennessee border. The highest abundance of pygmy salamanders is found at higher elevations ranging from 1600 to 2082 meters. The distribution of the salamander primarily lies adjacent to areas of red spruce (Picea rubens) and Fraser's fir (Abies fraseri) forests at these high elevations. However, pygmy salamanders populations can be found at lower elevations from 950 to 1400 meters, but the highest densities occur at the higher elevations. Desmognathus wrighti populations appear to have stayed fragmented for some time due to their restriction to high elevation. The lower elevation populations of the pygmy salamanders documented exhibit little gene flow. This low gene flow reflects their preference for higher elevation and possible competition with other Appalachian salamanders. In its known geographical locations the pygmy salamander can primarily be found in moist depressions such as under logs and rocks along streams, in damp leaf litter, and in mossy areas.

== Ecology ==
Desmognathus wrighti is typically a light brown color with a dorsal pigmentation pattern of inverted V's in a darker brown. The salamander ranges from 35 mm to 55 mm and rarely exceeds 50 mm making it the smallest salamander in the genus Desmognathus. Pygmy salamanders are typically found at higher elevations. Adult salamanders are active at night and have been found up to one meter above the ground in vegetation. The pygmy salamander is the most terrestrial species of its genus. It lives in depressions in moss and leaf litter on the forest floors and is most often found in spruce-fir forests of high elevation. The salamander goes to seepages and stream banks for egg-laying in summer and early autumn.

== Life history and behavior ==
D. wrighti courtship differs from other members of Desmognathus in the phenology of oviposition which is in late summer into autumn. Males reach sexual maturity by their second or third year while females reach their sexual maturity by their third year. Males normally have two testes lobes but this number can increase with body size. In courtship males use their vomerine teeth to bite the female which in turn allows pheromone secretion to enter directly into the female circulation. D. wrighti and D. aeneus are the only two desmognathine salamanders that exhibit the courtship that which the male bite and seizes its partner before behaviors exhibited to accomplish sperm transfer. The male approaches the female quickly, bites, and tugs as he begins to undulate his tail. The female in return turns towards the male and places her chin on his laterally undulating tail so that they rotate in full circle. Typically in courtship behavior a Plethodontidae characteristic tail-straddling walk follows. In the tail-straddling walk, the male release the female and slides his head under her chin, then her forelimbs straddle the male's tail and the pair then move forward. The male then deposits a spermatophore on the ground which is followed by the female picking up a sperm cap with her cloacal lips as she moves forward undulating her pelvic area.

Desmognathus wrighti females have an average clutch size of 8 to 9 eggs which are suspended by a single attachment stalk and develop between 4 and 25 oocytes. Females lay eggs in banks of streams in areas of saturated gravel. The females also typically remain close to their egg mass and coil their bodies around the mass. Eggs change from spheroid shape to ovoids when hatching conditions occur. The embryo then thrusts itself against the capsule and rotates within the egg until it escapes from the egg fluid. D. wrighti hatchlings are not larvae and have gills in late embryonic stages. At hatching the ventral side is unpigmented and the characteristic 'V' pigmentation is found on the dorsal side. The characteristic stripe from the eye to the jaw is also present in late embryo and hatching stages.

== Conservation ==
Desmognathus wrighti was assess in 2004 as being of least concern on the IUCN Red List of Threatened Species, in light of the species having a wide distribution, a large population, and being unlikely to decline fast enough to be placed in a more threatened category. Threats to the pygmy salamander include deforestation of spruce-fir forest. Acid rain is also a threat at the high elevation that can destroy the spruce-fir trees in the pygmy salamander's natural habitat.
