= Fernbank =

Fernbank may refer to:

== Australia ==
- Fernbank, Victoria
  - Fernbank railway station, Victoria

== Canada ==
- Fernbank, Ontario a proposed community near Ottawa, Ontario

== United States ==
- Fernbank, Alabama
- Fernbank was the estate of Col. Z. D. Harrison in DeKalb County, Georgia. Following his death in 1938, it was preserved and devoted to educational purposes. It lends its name to the following:
  - Fernbank Forest
  - Fernbank Museum of Natural History
  - Fernbank Observatory
  - Fernbank Science Center
