= USS Okinawa (LPH-3) =

Iwo Jima–class amphibious assault ship

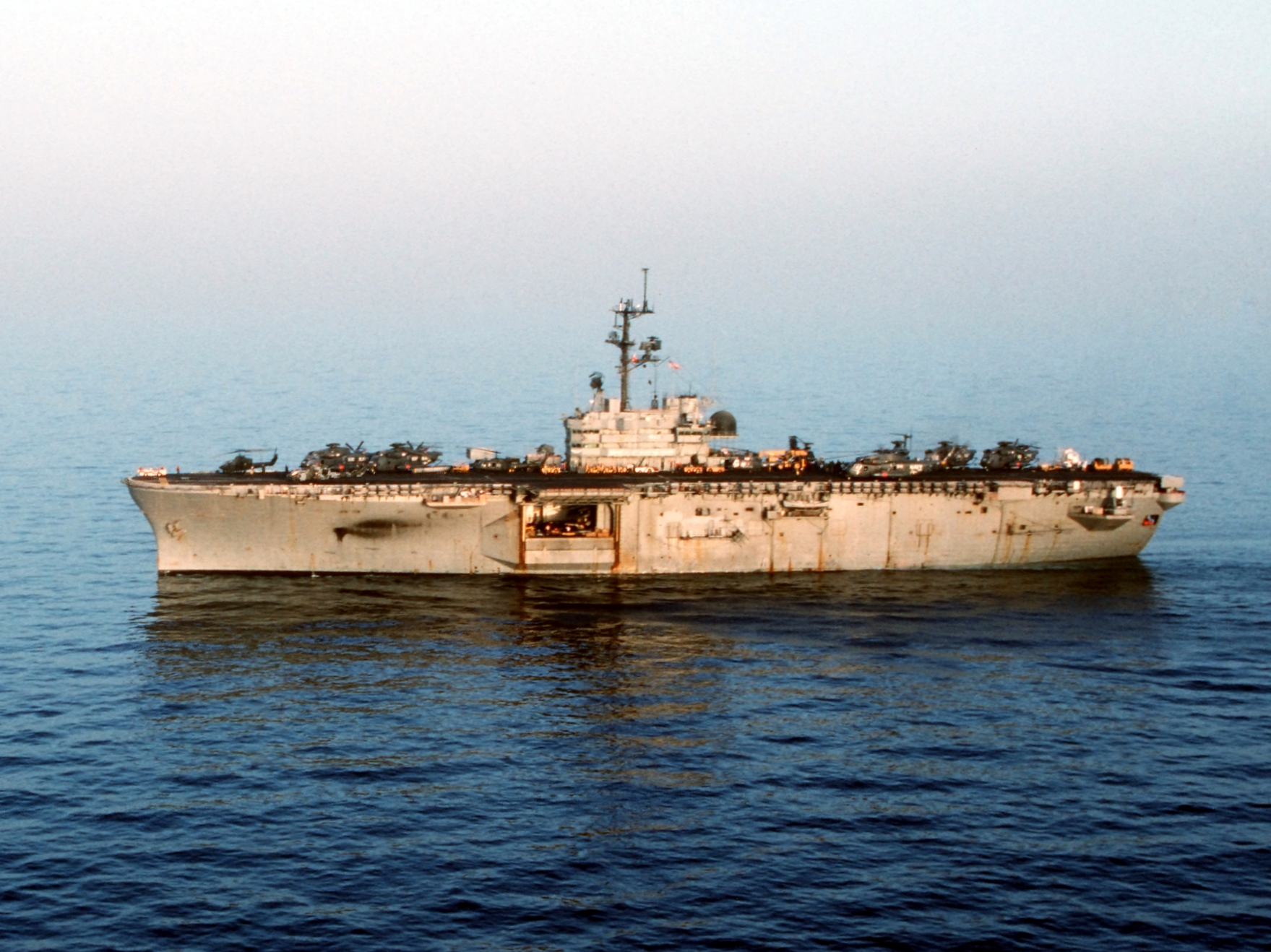
- USS Okinawa in the Persian Gulf in 1987

History

United States
- Name: Okinawa
- Namesake: Battle of Okinawa
- Ordered: 24 October 1958
- Builder: Philadelphia Naval Shipyard
- Laid down: 1 April 1960
- Launched: 19 August 1961
- Commissioned: 14 April 1962
- Decommissioned: 17 December 1992
- Stricken: 17 December 1992
- Identification: Callsign: NOKI; Hull number: LPH-3
- Fate: Sunk as target, 6 June 2002
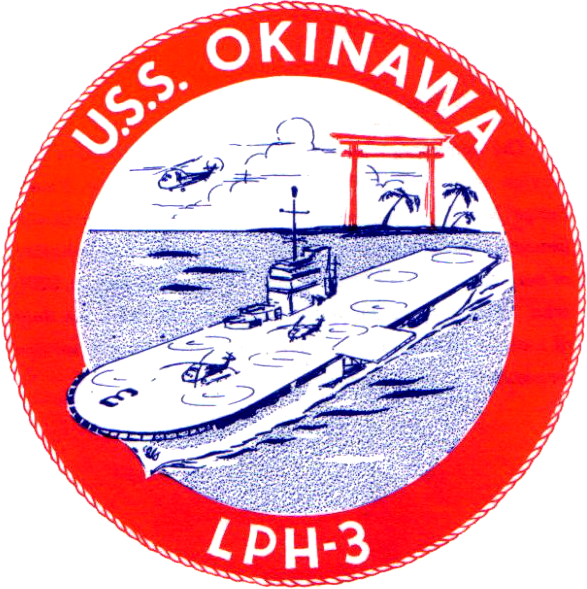
- Badge

General characteristics
- Class & type: Iwo Jima-class amphibious assault ship
- Displacement: 11,000 tons
- Length: 592 ft (180 m)
- Beam: 84 ft (26 m)
- Draft: 27 ft (8.2 m)
- Propulsion: 2 × 600 psi (4.1 MPa) boilers, one geared steam turbine, one shaft, 22,000 shaft horsepower; (16 MW)
- Speed: 22 knots (41 km/h)
- Complement: 667
- Armament: Initially: 2 × 2 3-inch (76 mm) / 50 caliber DP guns, 8 cell Sea Sparrow BPDMS launchers, Later: 2 × Phalanx CIWS
- Aircraft carried: 25 helicopters

USS Okinawa (LPH–3) was the second Iwo Jima-class amphibious assault ship of the United States Navy. She was the second Navy ship assigned the name "Okinawa", in honor of the World War II Battle of Okinawa.

== Construction ==
Okinawa was laid down on 1 April 1960 (15th anniversary of the invasion of Okinawa) by the Philadelphia Naval Shipyard, Philadelphia, Pennsylvania; launched on 19 August 1961; sponsored by Mrs. John L. McClellan, wife of Arkansas Senator John L. McClellan; and commissioned on 14 April 1962.

== History ==
=== Early career ===
Following commissioning and sea trials, Okinawa departed Philadelphia on 20 June 1962 for her homeport, Norfolk, Va., where she spent a month fitting out. After a six-week shakedown cruise out of Guantanamo Bay, Cuba and another month in Norfolk, the amphibious assault ship began participation in her first fleet exercise in the Caribbean, 15 October. Shortly thereafter the Cuban Missile Crisis arose and Okinawa remained in the area, lending force to the United States' stand, until 3 December, when she returned to Norfolk.

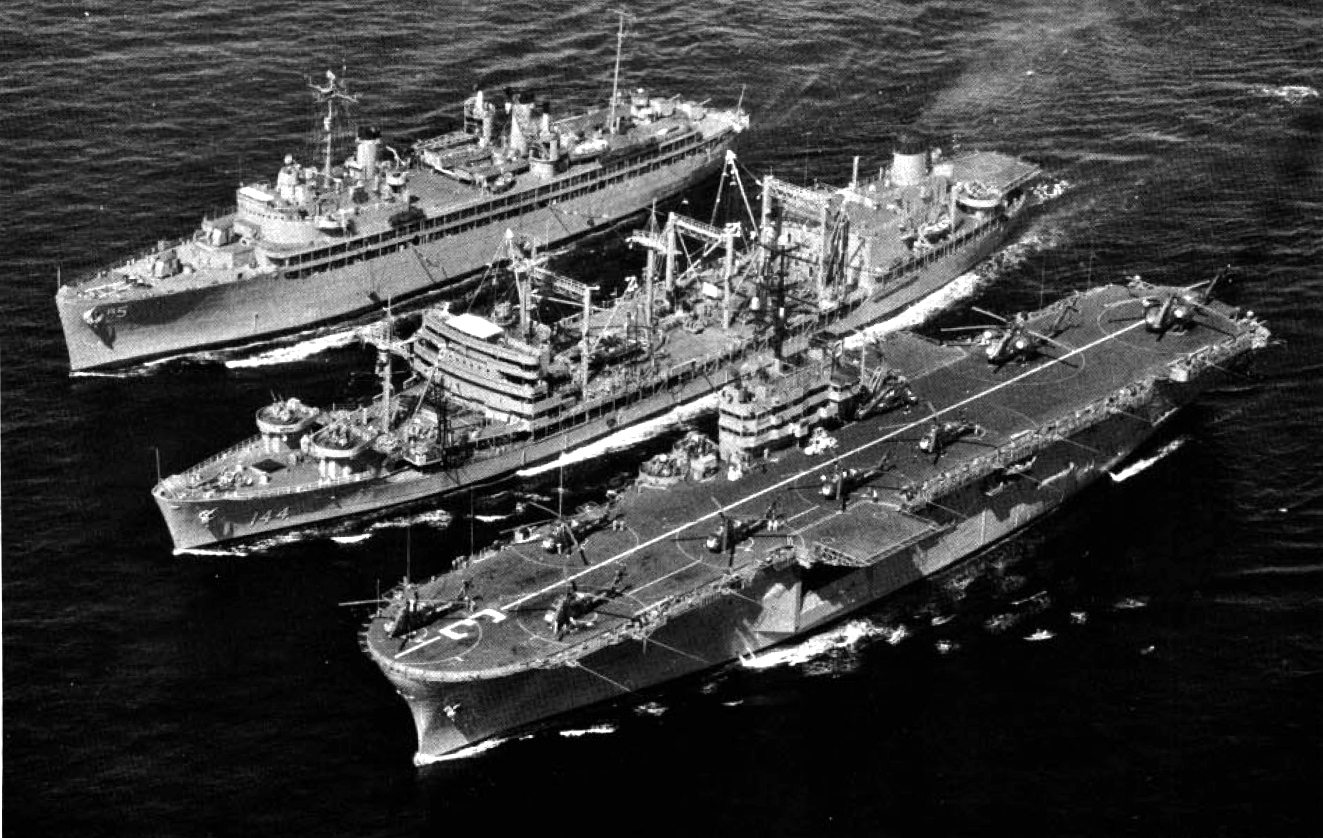
Mississinewa refuels Okinawa and Vulcan, in 1962.

The first half of 1963 was spent in availability at the Philadelphia and Norfolk Naval Shipyards and further trial operations in the Caribbean and out of Norfolk. On 9 July, Okinawa began her first formal Caribbean deployment, returning to Norfolk on 1 October and spending the remainder of that year and the first part of the next in that area. During June 1964, she sailed to Newport, Rhode Island and New York City for the World's Fair. On 7 October, she left on her first trip to European waters, for operation "Steel Pike I," an amphibious exercise off the coast of Spain. After a stop in France and a goodwill visit to Plymouth, England, Okinawa arrived back in Norfolk at the end of November.

=== Dominican Republic ===
In April 1965, while participating in an exercise off Puerto Rico, Okinawa was alerted and sent to an area off the Dominican Republic to act as medical evacuation ship with HMM-263 (Reinf) and the 1st Bn., 2d Marines during the Dominican crisis. The mission concluded on 29 May. Then, following the end of her deployment, she proceeded via Norfolk to Philadelphia for overhaul. In April 1966 she returned to Norfolk and began her third Caribbean deployment on 13 June. Okinawa was transferred to the Pacific Fleet; she set sail for the West Coast on 24 January 1967 and arrived at San Diego, her new home port, on 8 February.

=== Vietnam and Apollo 6 and Apollo 15 spacecraft recoveries ===
Okinawa left on 10 March for her first deployment off Vietnam. On 13 April, while sailing from Okinawa to Taiwan, the ship was diverted by a distress call, and the next day rescued all 38 persons from the grounded Panamanian vessel Silver Peak near the Sento Shosho Islands. While off Vietnam, Okinawa was a mobile base from which a well-equipped force of marines could quickly strike via helicopters at the Communist insurgents. She returned to San Diego on 5 December.

On 4 April 1968, after an intensive period of special training, Okinawa recovered the unmanned Apollo 6 space capsule 380 miles north of Kauai, Hawaii. With further exercises and upkeep, she conducted her second Westpac deployment from 2 November to 26 June 1969, when she arrived in San Diego for leave and upkeep.

On 17 May 1970, Okinawa delivered ten A-4K Skyhawk single-seaters, and four TA-4K two-seaters to New Zealand, after their purchase for the Royal New Zealand Air Force. The ship survived a severe storm after leaving Hawaii and the captain considered dumping the aircraft into the sea to save his ship but the storm abated.

In 1970 Okinawa was awarded the Philippine Presidential Unit Citation for her humanitarian assistance to the people of Lagonoy Gulf, Republic of the Philippines, who had been devastated by Typhoon Jean in October 1970.

On 7 August 1971, Okinawa was the recovery ship for the Apollo 15 spacecraft and crew of the fourth crewed Apollo program lunar landing mission.

=== The downfall of Republic of Cambodia ===
In April 1975, Okinawa participated in Operation Eagle Pull, the evacuation of Phnom Penh, Cambodia and Operation Frequent Wind, the evacuation of Saigon, Vietnam.

=== Persian Gulf ===
From 7 October 1987 to 7 April 1988, Okinawa was deployed to the Persian Gulf in support of mine sweeping operations and MAGTF 1-88. She began her deployment heading West and continued West, circumnavigating the world.

Okinawa was the command ship of the 13th Marine Expeditionary Unit in August 1990 as part of a WestPac deployment when it was diverted to the Persian Gulf in support of Operations Desert Shield and Desert Storm during the Gulf War. Helicopters were launched as a diversion during the start of the ground phase of the war.

=== Fate ===
Okinawa was decommissioned and stricken from the Naval Vessel Register on 17 December 1992. She was transferred to MARAD and laid up in the National Defense Reserve Fleet, in Suisun Bay, Benicia, Calif.

The ship was sunk as a target in a COMSUBPAC ship sinking exercise (SINKEX) on 6 June 2002, off the coast of Southern California, in 2,020 fathoms (3,690 m) at 031°27′N 119°42′W. After being hit by several Maverick, Harpoon missiles, and general-purpose bombs, the ex-Okinawa was finally sunk by a Mk 48 torpedo fired by the USS Portsmouth.

== Awards, citations, and campaign ribbons ==

- Top Row: Combat Action Ribbon (2) / Navy Unit Commendation (5)
- Second Row: Navy Meritorious Unit Commendation (3) / Navy Battle "E" Ribbon / Navy Expeditionary Medal (1: Cuba, 2: Iran/Indian Ocean)
- Third Row: National Defense Service Medal / Armed Forces Expeditionary Medal (1: Cuba, 1: Dominican Republic, 1: Op. Eagle Pull, 1:Op. Frequent Wind, 2: Persian Gulf Op. Earnest Will) / Vietnam Service Medal (7)
- Fourth Row: Southwest Asia Service Medal / Humanitarian Service Medal (1: Eagle Pull, 1: Frequent Wind) / Philippine Presidential Unit Citation
- Fifth Row: Republic of Vietnam Gallantry Cross Unit Citation (5) / Republic of Vietnam Campaign Medal / Kuwait Liberation Medal (Kuwait)

== Gallery ==
USS Okinawa Lifecycle

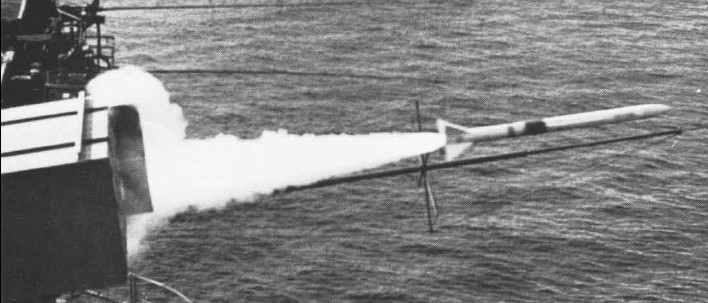
USS Okinawa fires a RIM-7 Sea Sparrow Missile in 1970.

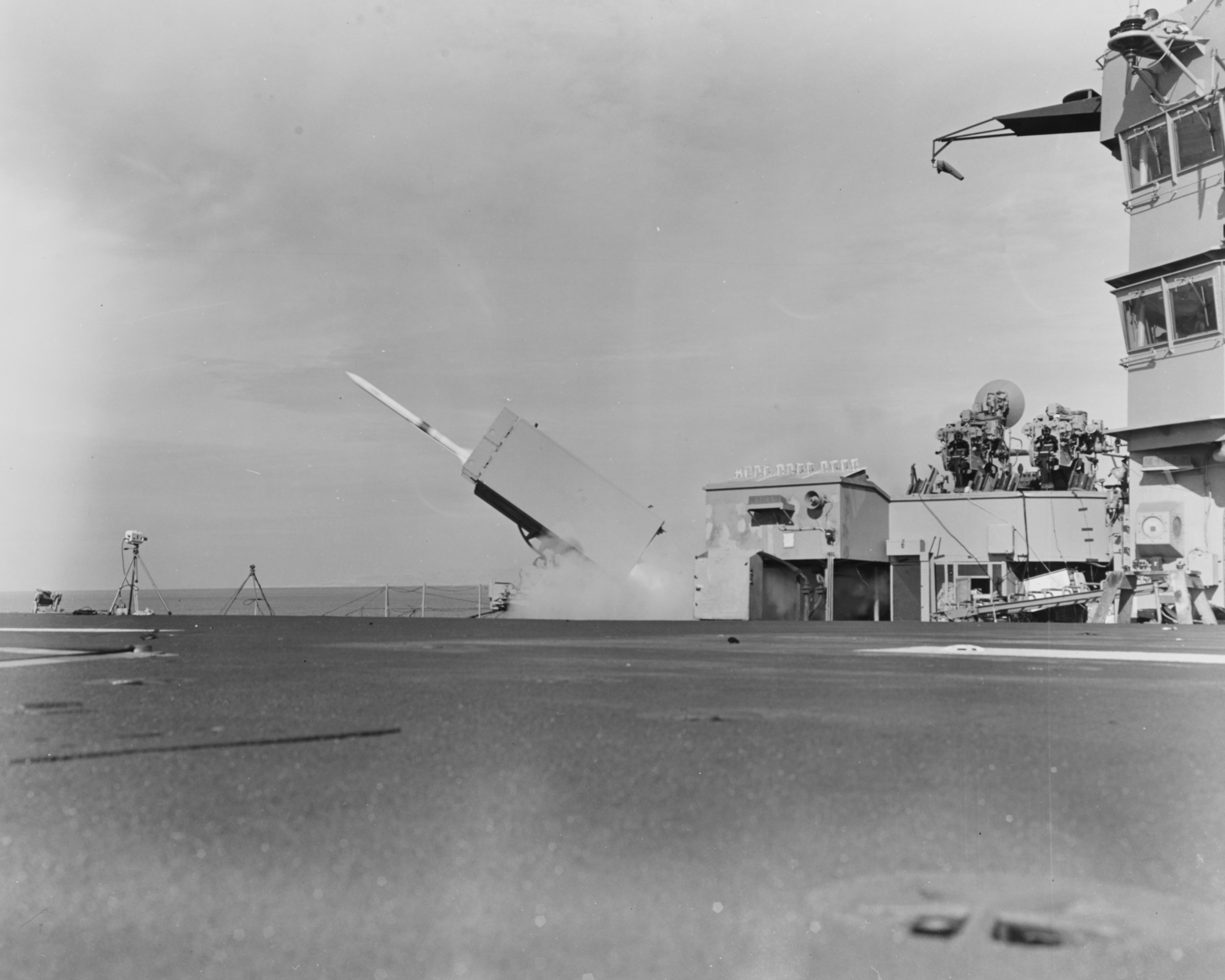
USS Okinawa fires a RIM-7 Sea Sparrow Missile on 9 January 1970.

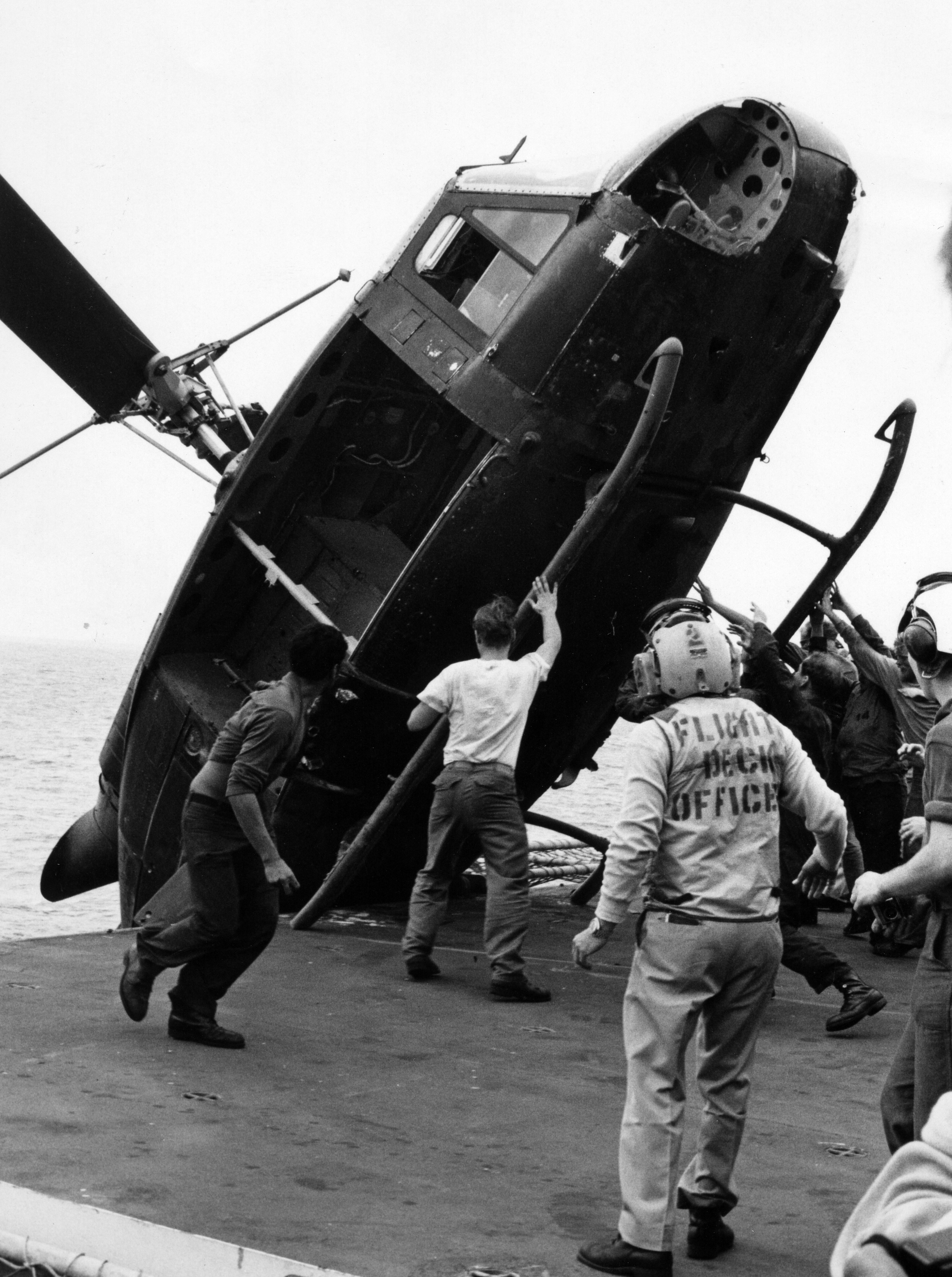
South Vietnamese helicopter is pushed over the side of USS Okinawa during Operation Frequent Wind in April 1975.

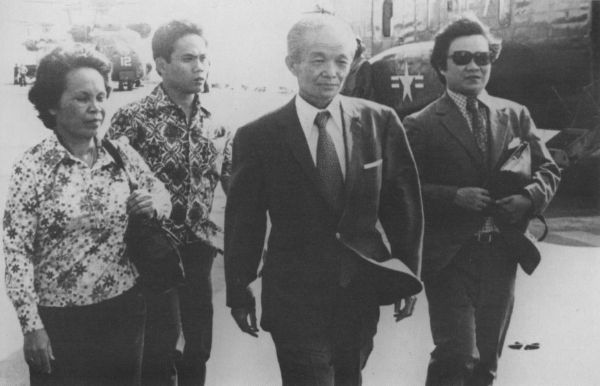
General Saukham Khoy arrives on board USS Okinawa, 12 April 1975.

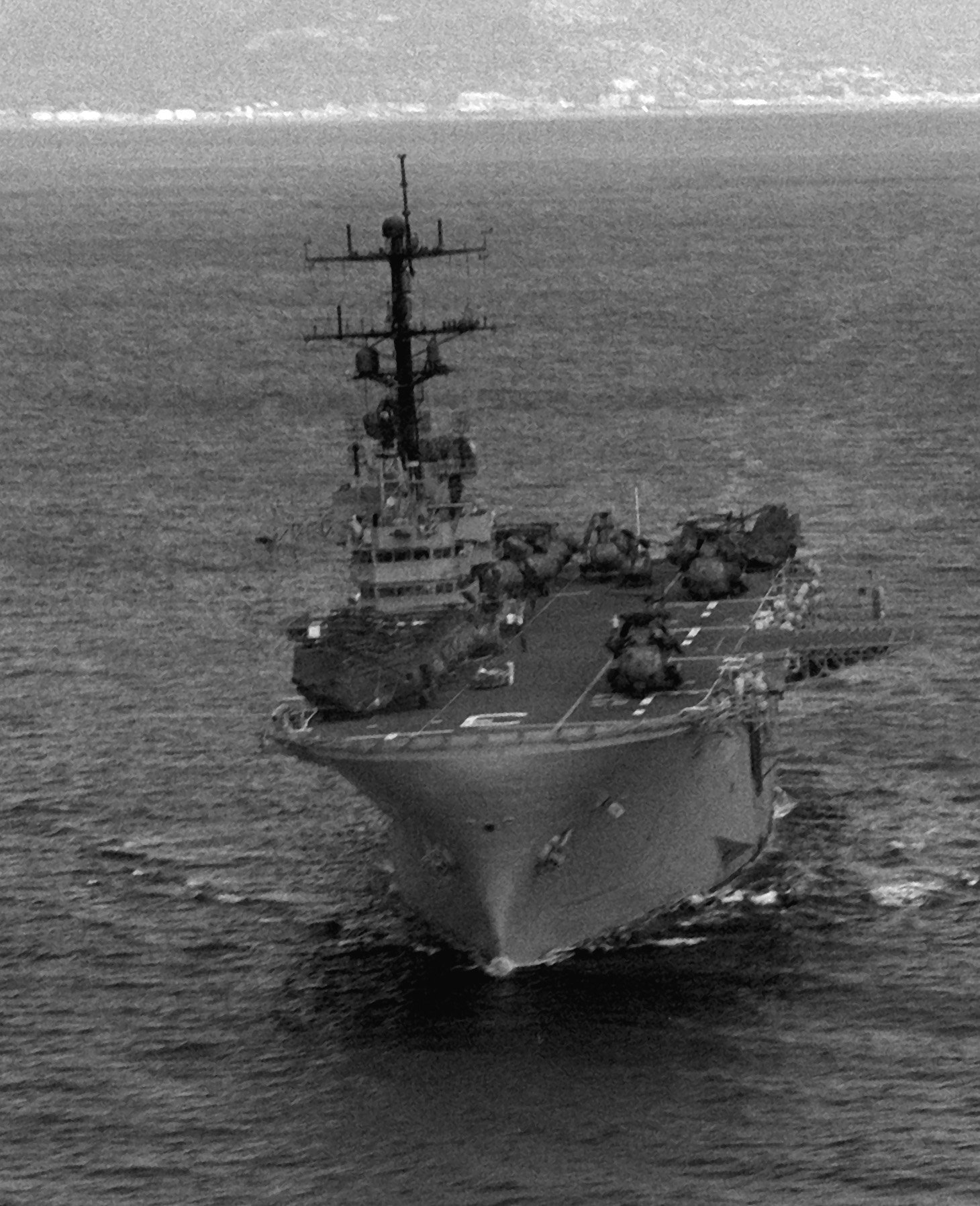
USS Okinawa underway in 1982.

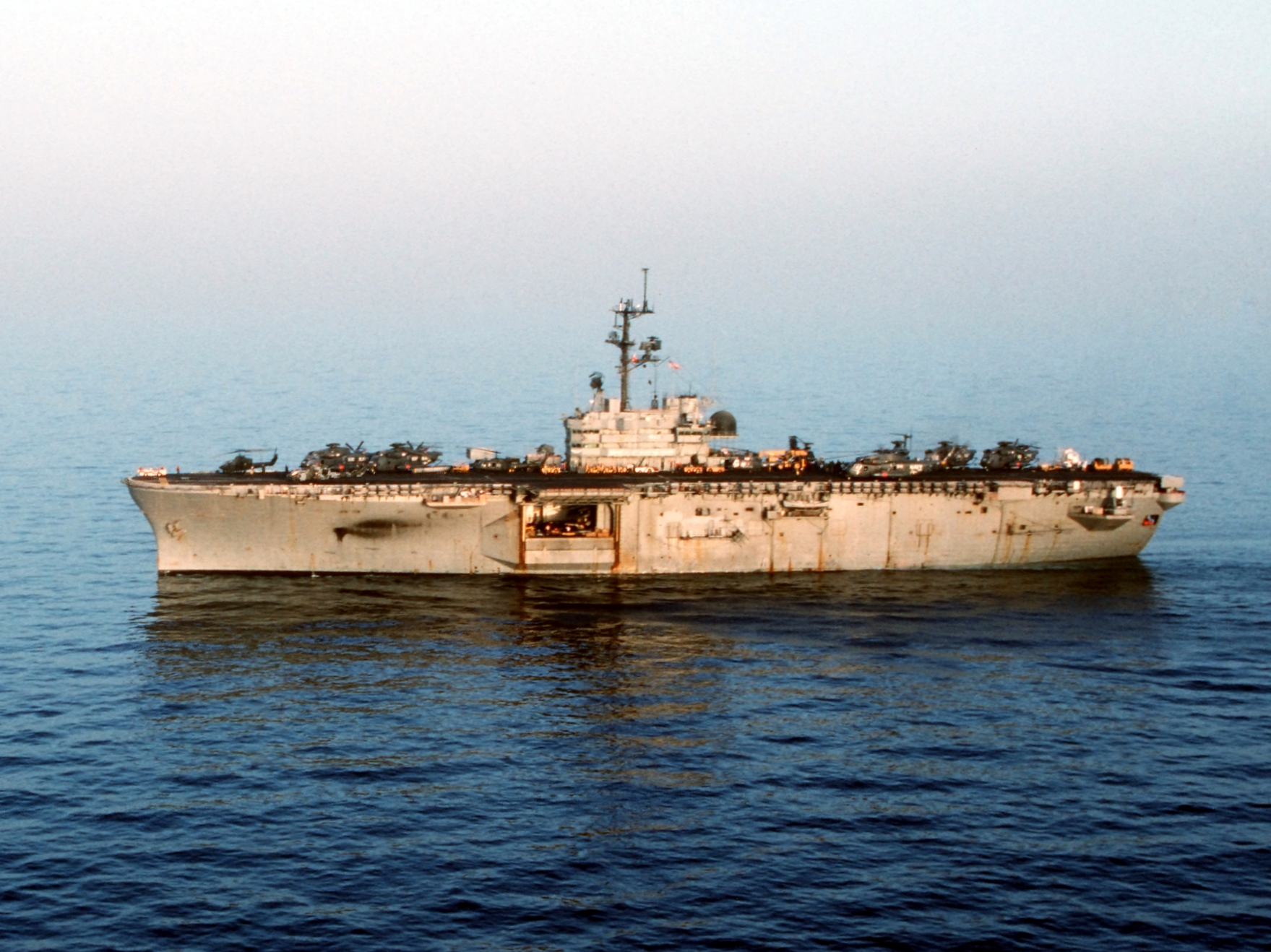
USS Okinawa in early 1987.

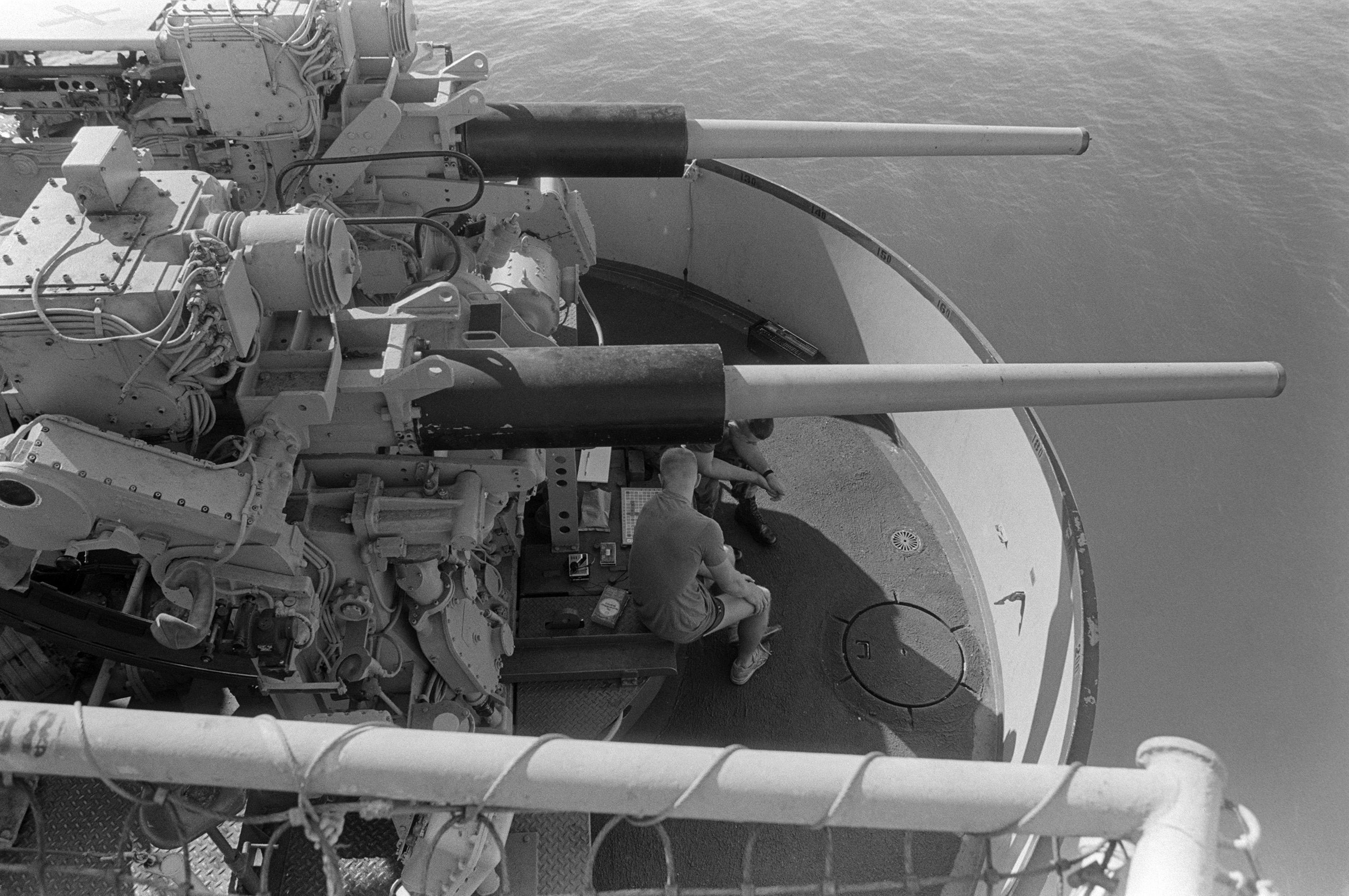
Dual 3inch 50cal gun of USS Okinawa in 1987.

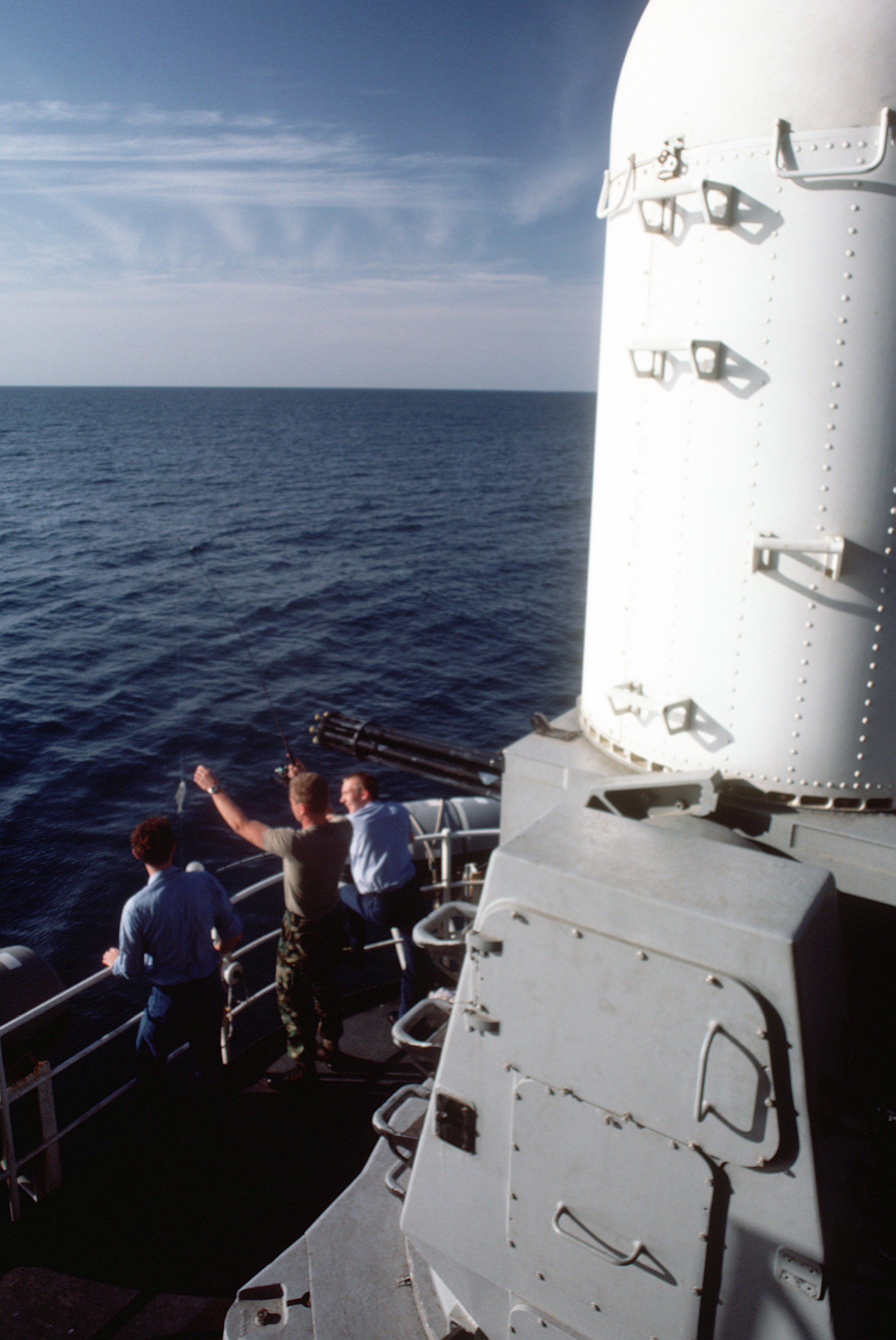
USS Okinawa's Mk16 Phalanx CIWS in 1987.

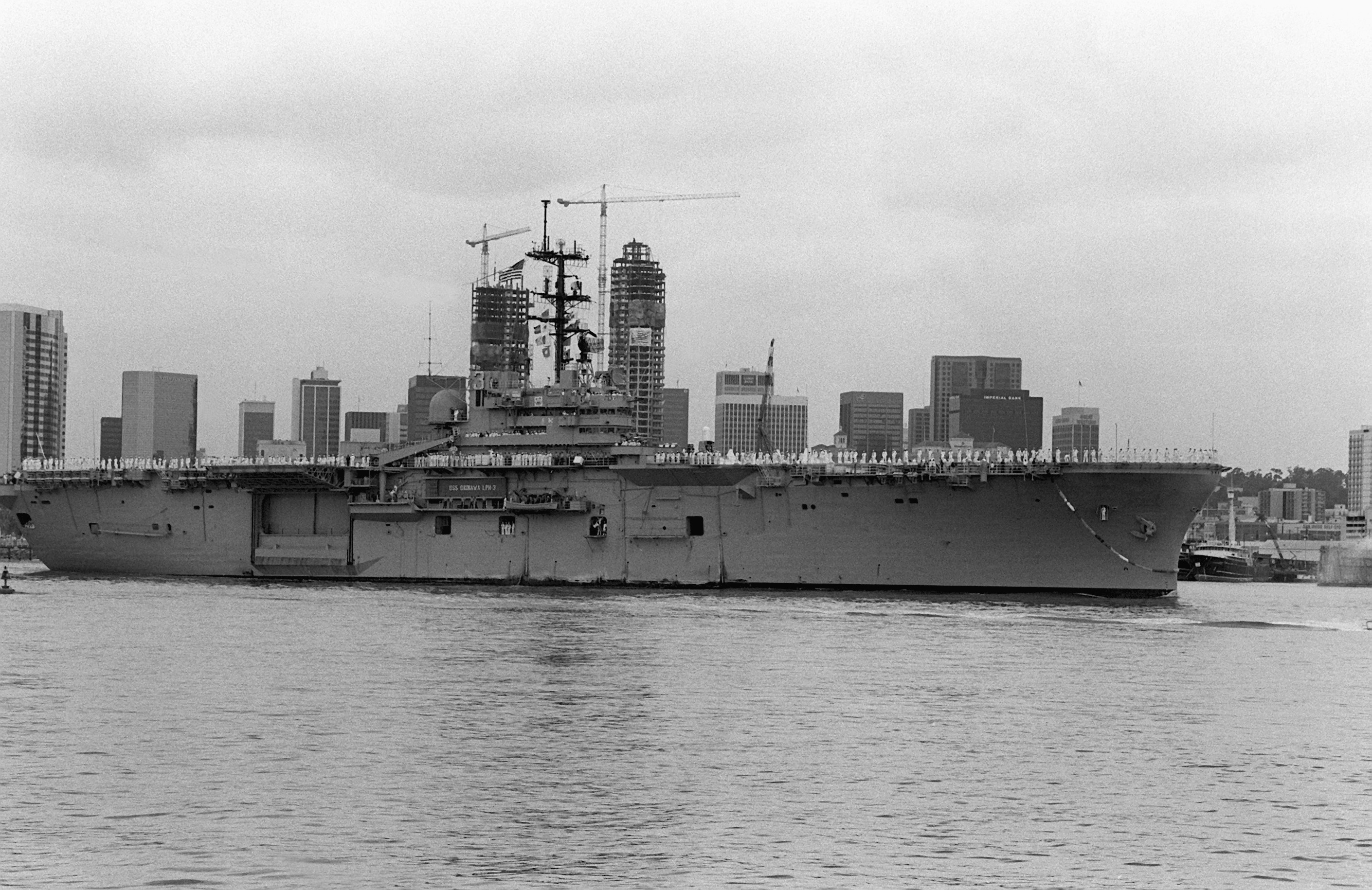
USS Okinawa arrives at San Diego in 1991.

Kuwaiti SA330 lands on USS Okinawa in 1992.

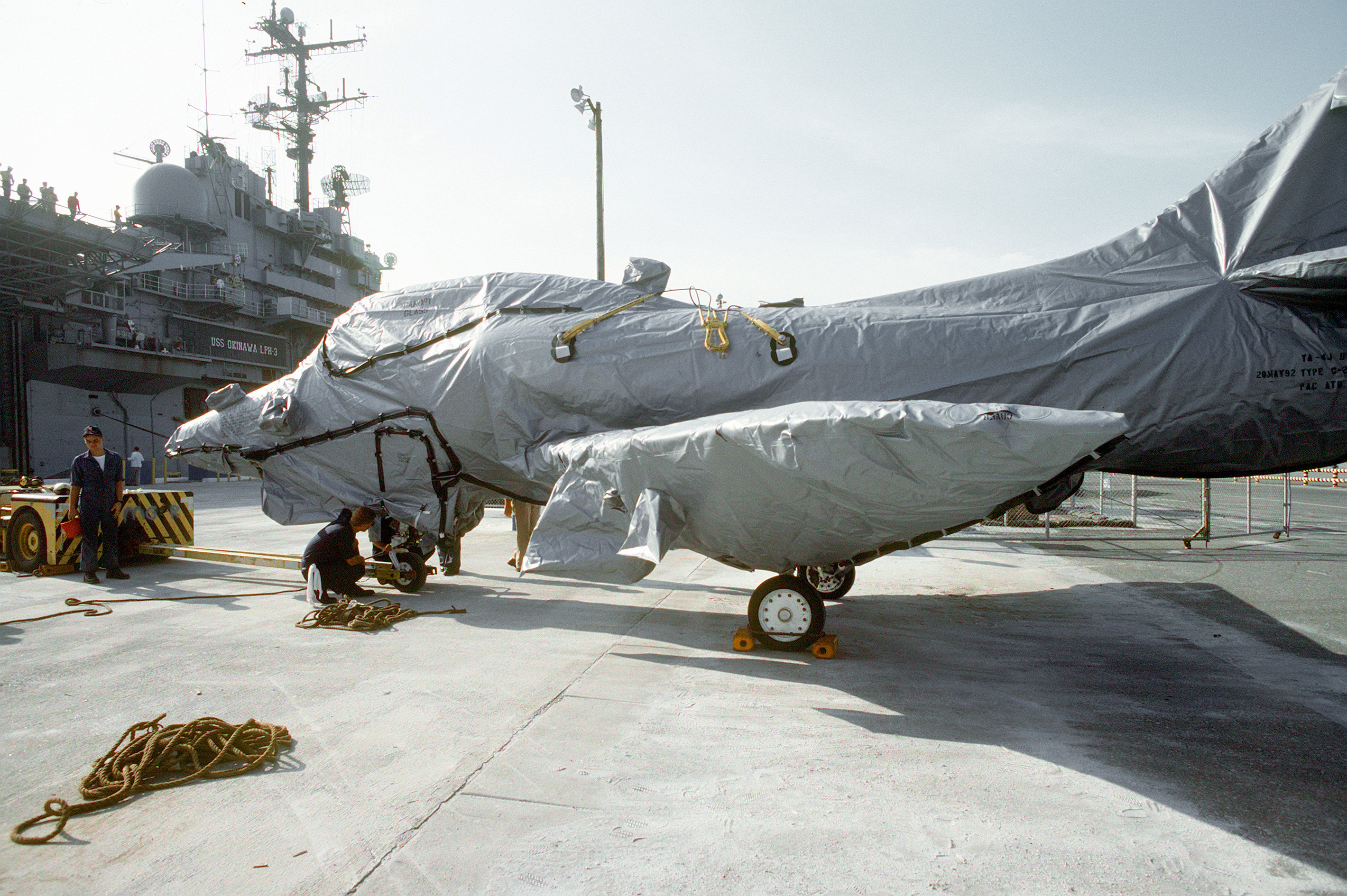
Douglas TA-4J Skyhawk prior being loaded into USS Okinawa at NAS Cubi Point on 4 June 1992.

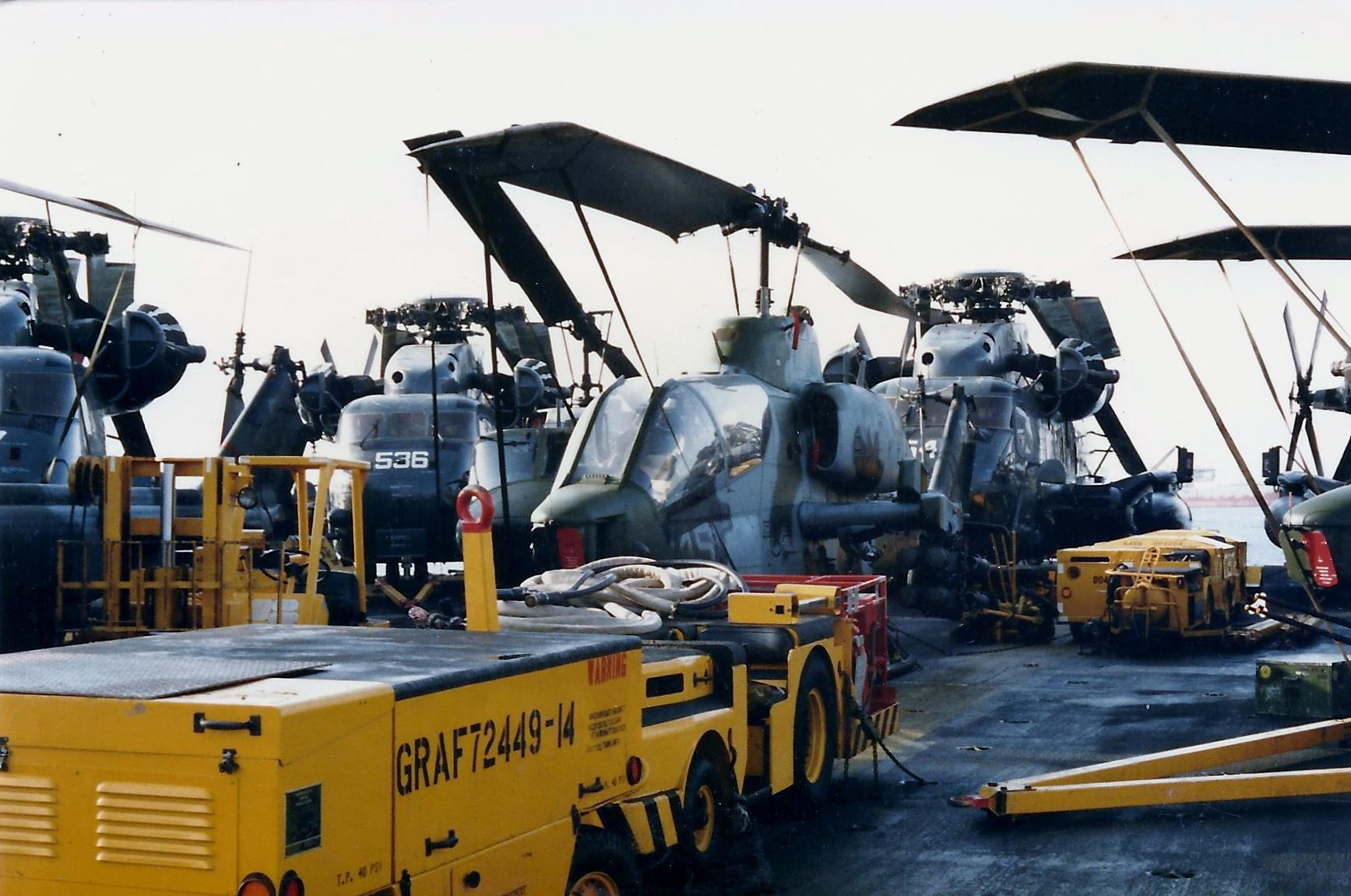
Aft flight deck. Photo taken in late 87 or early 88. HM-14's RH-53D and HMLA-169's AH-1W Cobras
