= Apollo 6 =

1968 American Saturn V rocket test flight

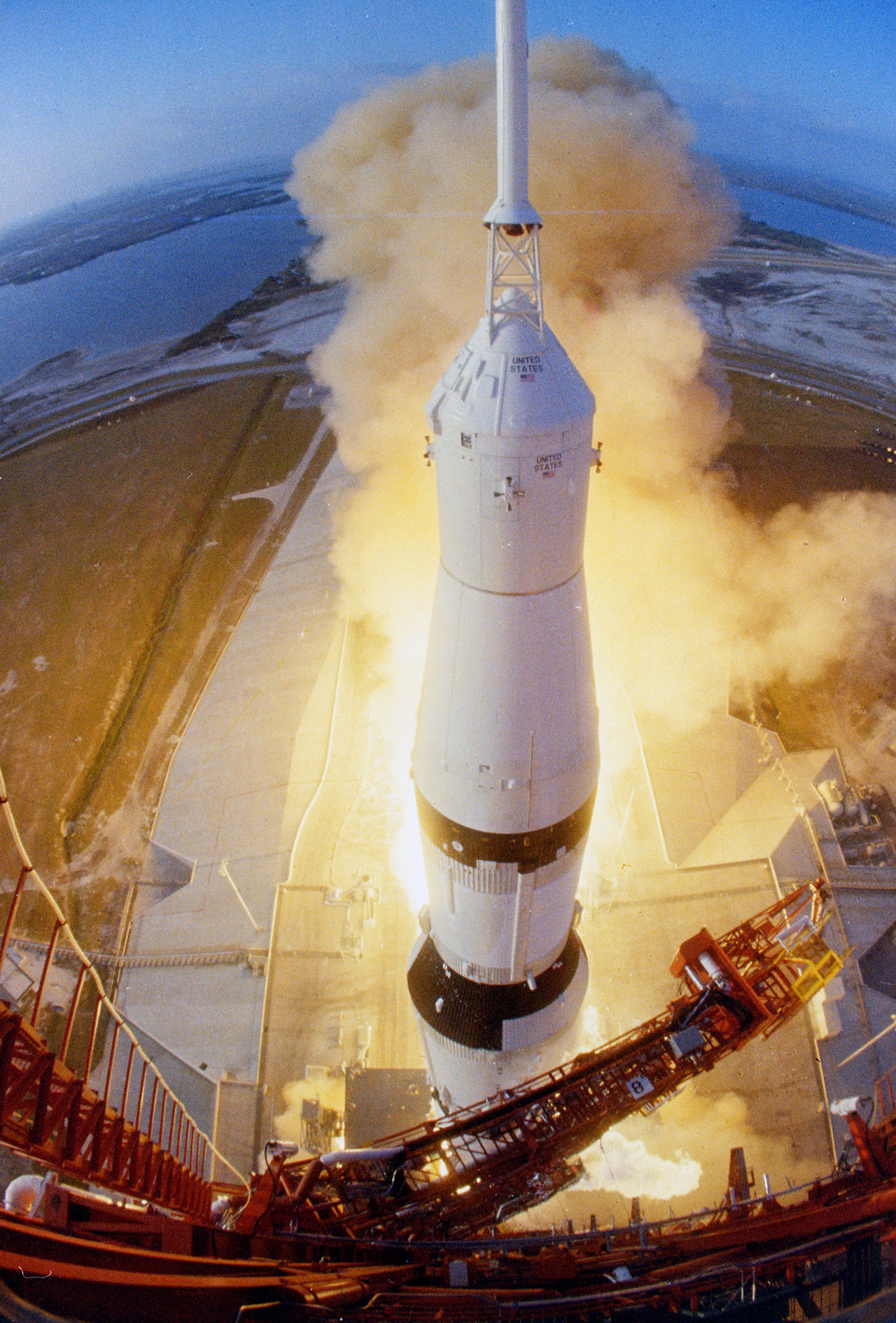
- Launch of Apollo 6 (identifiable by its white-painted service module) as seen from the top of the launch tower
- Mission type: Uncrewed Earth orbital CSM flight (A)
- Operator: NASA
- COSPAR ID: 1968-025A
- SATCAT no.: 3170
- Mission duration: 9 hours 57 minutes 20 seconds
- Orbits completed: 3

Spacecraft properties
- Spacecraft: Apollo CSM-020; Apollo LTA-2R
- Manufacturer: North American Rockwell
- Launch mass: Total: 36,930 kilograms (81,420 lb); CSM: 25,140 kilograms (55,420 lb)

Start of mission
- Launch date: April 4, 1968, 12:00:01 UTC
- Rocket: Saturn V SA-502
- Launch site: Kennedy Space Center Launch Complex 39

End of mission
- Recovered by: USS Okinawa
- Landing date: April 4, 1968, 21:57:21 UTC
- Landing site: 27°40′N 157°55′W

Apollo 6 (April 4, 1968), also known as AS-502, was the third and final uncrewed flight in the United States' Apollo program and the second test of the Saturn V launch vehicle. The Saturn V's utilization during the mission qualified it for use during human spaceflight, and it was used beginning on Apollo 8 in December 1968.

Apollo 6 was intended to demonstrate the ability of the Saturn V's third stage, the S-IVB, to propel itself and the Apollo spacecraft to lunar distances. Its components began arriving at the Kennedy Space Center in early 1967. Testing proceeded slowly, often delayed by testing of the Saturn V intended for Apollo 4—the inaugural launch of the Saturn V. After that uncrewed mission launched in November 1967, there were fewer delays, but enough so that the flight was postponed from March to April 1968.

The flight plan called for, following trans-lunar injection, a direct return abort using the service module's main engine with a flight time totaling about 10 hours, but vibrations damaged some of the Rocketdyne J-2 engines in the second and third stages by rupturing internal fuel lines causing a second-stage engine to shut down early. An additional second-stage engine also shut down early due to cross-wiring with the engine that had shut down. The vehicle's onboard guidance system compensated by burning the second and third stages longer, although the resulting parking orbit was more elliptical than planned. The damaged third-stage engine failed to restart for trans-lunar injection. Flight controllers elected to repeat the flight profile of the previous Apollo 4 test, achieving a high orbit and high-speed return. Despite the engine failures, the flight provided NASA with enough confidence to use the Saturn V for crewed launches; a potential third uncrewed flight of the Saturn V was cancelled.

== Objectives ==
Apollo 6, the second test flight of the Saturn V launch vehicle, was intended to send a command and service module (CSM) plus a Lunar Test Article (LTA), a simulated lunar module (LM) with mounted structural vibration sensors, into a trans-lunar trajectory, with the boost from orbit to trans-lunar velocity powered by the Saturn V's third stage, the S-IVB. That trajectory, although passing beyond the orbit of the Moon, would not encounter it. The CSM was to separate from the S-IVB soon after the burn, and the SM engine would then fire to slow the craft, dropping its apogee to 22204 km (11989 nmi) and causing the CSM to return to Earth, simulating a "direct-return" abort. On the return leg, the engine was to fire once more to accelerate the craft to simulate conditions that the Apollo spacecraft would encounter on its return from the Moon, with a re-entry angle of −6.5 degrees and velocity of 11100 m/s (36500 ft/s). The entire mission was to last about 10 hours.

The mission was intended to test the Saturn V launch vehicle's ability to send the entire Apollo spacecraft to the Moon—in particular, to test the stresses on the LM and the vibration modes of the entire Saturn V with near-full loads. With the spacecraft having been qualified for crewed flight through the Apollo 4 mission (the first flight of the Saturn V), the focus was on fully qualifying the launch vehicle. Nominal completion of planned mission events through attainment of the initial parking orbit, and the restarting of the S-IVB to propel the space vehicle towards the planned distance, beyond the Moon's orbit, was deemed sufficient to fulfill Apollo 6's main objectives.

== Equipment ==
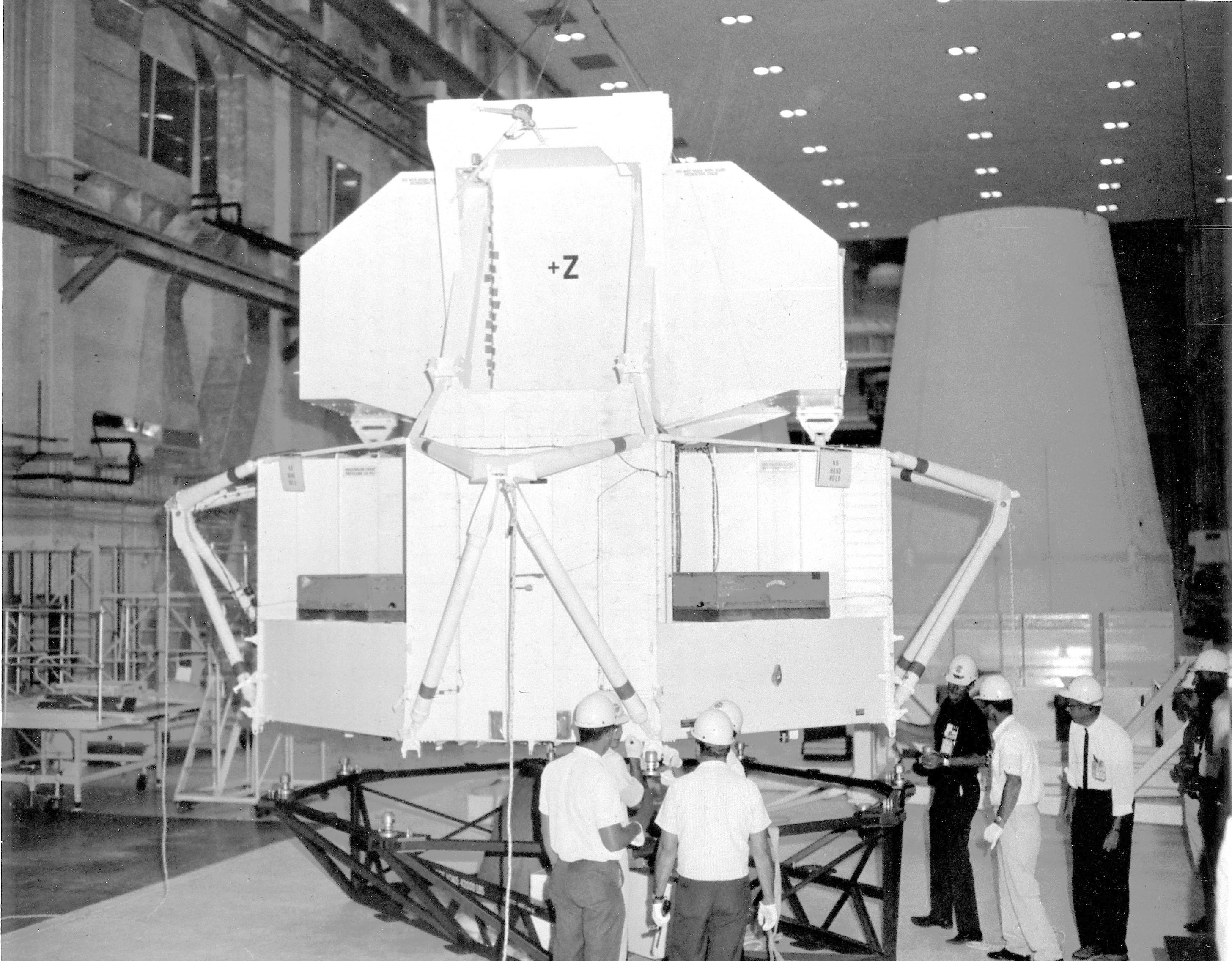
The Lunar Module Test Article (LTA-2R) being moved for mating with the spacecraft–LM adapter

Apollo 6's launch vehicle was designated AS-502, the second flight-capable Saturn V. Its payload included CSM-020, a Block I CSM that had some Block II modifications. The Block I CSM did not have the capability of docking with a Lunar Module, as the Block II did. Among the modifications to CSM-020 was a new crew hatch, intended to be tested under lunar return conditions. This new hatch replaced the one which was condemned by the Apollo 1 investigation board as too difficult to open in case of emergency, circumstances that had contributed to the deaths of three astronauts in the Apollo 1 fire of January 27, 1967. The command module used was CM-020; it carried a mission programmer and other equipment to allow it to be operated remotely.

The service module used was SM-014—the originally-planned SM for Apollo 6, SM-020, was used for Apollo 4 after its SM, SM-017, was damaged in an explosion and had to be scrapped. CM-014 was unavailable for flight as it was being used to aid the Apollo 1 investigation. Not all SM systems were activated for the short Apollo 6 mission: the radiators to remove excess heat from the electrical power system and the environmental control system were not connected.

Kenneth S. Kleinknecht, Command and Service Module manager at the Manned Spaceflight Center in Houston, was pleased with CSM-020 when it arrived at Kennedy Space Center from North American Aviation, the manufacturer, though he was upset it arrived wrapped in flammable mylar. In contrast with Apollo 1's ill-fated CSM, which arrived with hundreds of unresolved issues, CSM-020 had only 23, mostly routine problems.

Also flown on Apollo 6 was a lunar test article: a simulated lunar module, designated as LTA-2R. It included a flight-type descent stage without landing gear, its fuel tanks filled with a water–glycol mixture and freon in its oxidizer tanks. Containing no flight systems, its ascent stage was made of ballasted aluminum and instrumented to show vibration, acoustics and structural integrity. LTA-2R remained inside the Spacecraft-Lunar Module Adapter, numbered SLA-9, throughout the flight.

== Preparation ==
The S-IC first stage arrived by barge on March 13, 1967, and was erected in the Vehicle Assembly Building (VAB) four days later; the S-IVB third stage and Instrument Unit computer both arrived on March 17. The S-II second stage was not yet ready and so the dumbbell-shaped spacer, used in preparation for Apollo 4 (which also had a delayed S-II), was substituted so testing could proceed. The spacer had the same height and mass as the S-II along with all the electrical connections. The S-II arrived May 24 and was stacked and mated into the rocket on July 7.

Apollo 6 saw the first use of the High Bay 3 of the VAB, and it was quickly discovered that its air conditioning facilities were inadequate. Portable high-capacity units were brought in to keep equipment and workers cool. There were delays in April as personnel and equipment were busy with Apollo 4, and not available for tests on Apollo 6. The S-II second stage arrived on May 25 and was erected in one of the VAB's low bays, but work on Apollo 6 continued to be plagued by delays, many occasioned by work on Apollo 4. The vehicle was erected on Mobile Service Launcher 2, but work on the launcher's arms, which would swing back at launch, proceeded slowly. Also slow to arrive was the CSM itself; the planned late-September arrival was pushed back two months.

After Apollo 4's launch on November 9, 1967, the pace of the Apollo 6 project picked up, but there remained many problems with flight hardware. The CSM was erected atop the launch vehicle on December 11, 1967, and the spacecraft stack was rolled out to Launch Complex 39A on February 6, 1968. The rollout was an all-day affair, and much of it was conducted in heavy rain. Because the crawler-transporter had to halt for two hours when communications failed, the vehicle did not arrive at the launch pad until it was dark. The mobile service structure could not be moved to the launch pad for two days due to high winds.

The flight readiness test concluded on March 8, 1968, and at a review held three days later, Apollo 6 was cleared for launch contingent on the successful completion of testing and some action items identified at the meeting. Launch was set for March 28, 1968, but was postponed to April 1 and then April 3 after problems with some guidance system equipment and with fueling. The countdown demonstration test began on March 24; although it was completed within a week, the launch had to be postponed one more time. On April 3, the final countdown began with liftoff scheduled for the following day. All subsequent problems were fixed during the built-in holds in the countdown and did not delay the mission.

== Flight ==
=== Launch ===
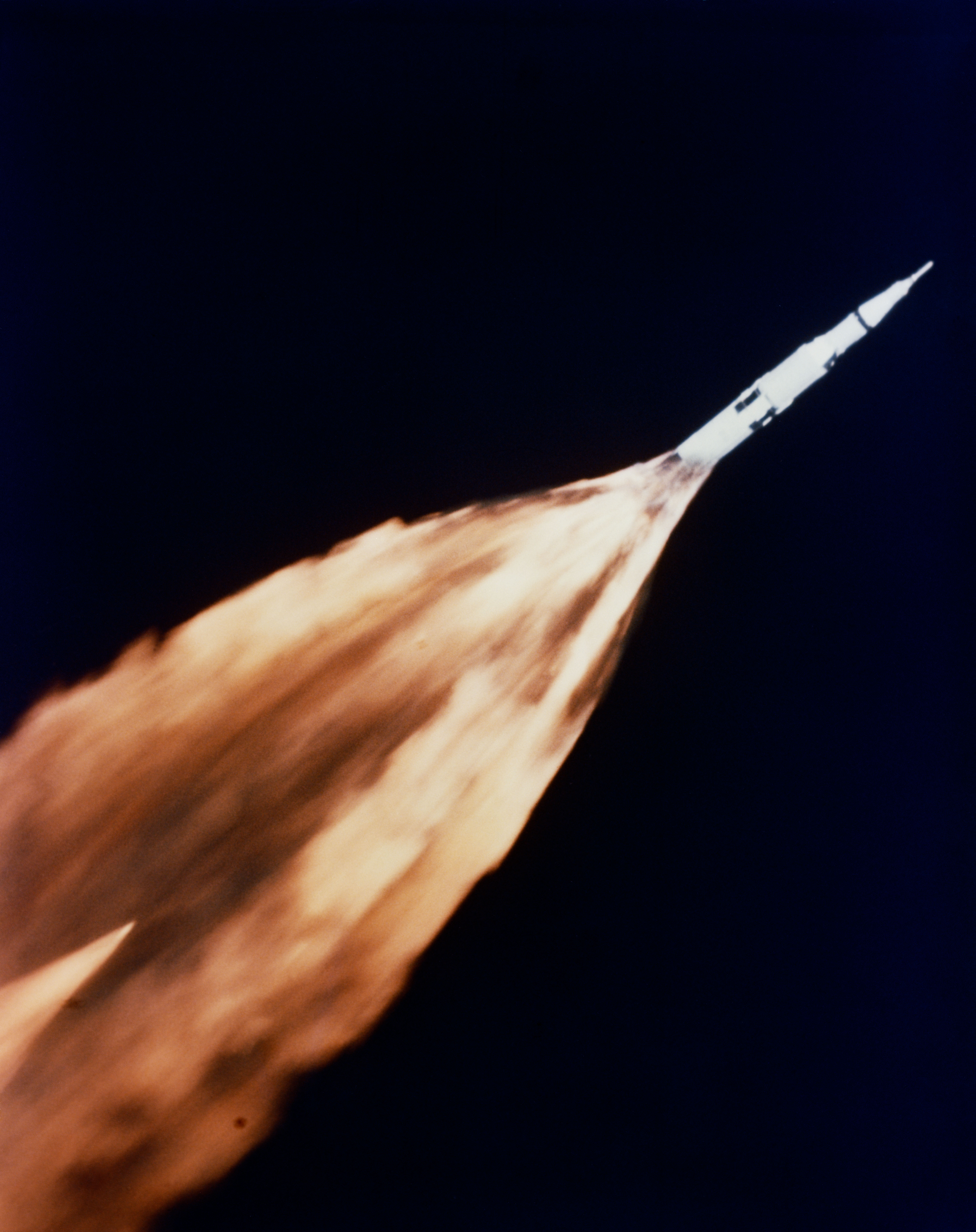
This view of the Apollo 6 launch was taken from a chase plane.

Apollo 6 launched from Launch Complex 39A at Kennedy Space Center on April 4, 1968, at 7:00:01 am EST (12:00 UTC). For the first two minutes, the Saturn V launch vehicle behaved normally. Then, as the Saturn V's S-IC first stage burned, pogo oscillations shook the vehicle. The thrust variations caused the Saturn V to experience a g-force of ±0.6 g (5.9 m/s^{2}), though it had only been designed for a maximum of 0.25 g (2.5 m/s^{2}). The vehicle suffered no damage, other than the loss of one of the panels of the Spacecraft-Lunar Module Adapter (SLA).

NASA Associate Administrator for Manned Space Flight George Mueller explained the cause to a hearing of the House Committee on Government Operations:

Pogo arises fundamentally because you have thrust fluctuations in the engines. Those are normal characteristics of engines. All engines have what you might call noise in their output because the combustion is not quite uniform, so you have this fluctuation in thrust of the first stage as a normal characteristic of all engine burning.

Now, in turn, the engine is fed through a pipe that takes the fuel out of the tanks and feeds it into the engine. That pipe's length is something like an organ pipe so it has a certain resonance frequency of its own and it really turns out that it will oscillate just like an organ pipe does.

The structure of the vehicle is much like a tuning fork, so if you strike it right, it will oscillate up and down longitudinally. In a gross sense it is the interaction between the various frequencies that causes the vehicle to oscillate.

After the first stage was jettisoned, the S-II second stage began to experience problems with its J-2 engines. Engine number two had performance problems from 225 seconds after liftoff, abruptly worsening at T+319 seconds. At T+412 seconds the Instrument Unit shut it down altogether, and two seconds later, engine number three also shut down. The fault was in engine two, but due to cross-connection of wires, the command from the Instrument Unit also shut down engine three, which had been running normally. The Instrument Unit was able to compensate, and the remaining three engines burned for 58 seconds longer than planned. The S-IVB third stage also had to burn for 29 seconds longer than usual. The S-IVB also experienced a slight performance loss.

=== Orbit ===
Due to the less-than-nominal launch, the CSM and S-IVB were inserted into a 173.14 km (93.49 nmi) by 360.10 km (194.44 nmi) parking orbit, instead of the planned 190 km (100 nmi) circular parking orbit. This deviation from the flight plan did not preclude continuing the mission. During the first orbit, the S-IVB maneuvered, changing its attitude towards the horizon to qualify techniques that future astronauts could use in landmark tracking. Then, after the standard two orbits to assess the vehicle's readiness for trans-lunar injection (TLI), the S-IVB was ordered to restart, but failed to do so.

Deciding on a pre-planned alternate mission, the flight director, Clifford E. Charlesworth, and his team in Mission Control chose to use the SM's Service Propulsion System (SPS) engine to raise the spacecraft into an orbit with a high apogee (point of furthest distance from Earth), with a low perigee that would result in re-entry, as had been done in Apollo 4. This plan would complete some of the mission objectives. The SPS engine burned for 442 seconds to get to the planned 22204 km (11989 nmi) apogee. There was now, however, not enough propellant to speed up the atmospheric reentry with a second SPS engine burn, and the spacecraft only entered the atmosphere at a speed of 10000 m/s (33000 ft/s) instead of the planned 11000 m/s (37000 ft/s) that would simulate a lunar return. While at high altitudes, the CM was able to return data on the extent to which future astronauts would be protected from the Van Allen Belts by the skin of the spacecraft.

Ten hours after launch, the CM landed 80 kilometers (43 nmi) from the planned touchdown point in the North Pacific Ocean north of Hawaii, and was lifted on board USS Okinawa. The SM was jettisoned just before reaching the atmosphere and burned up. The S-IVB's orbit gradually decayed and it reentered the atmosphere on April 26, 1968.

== Aftermath ==
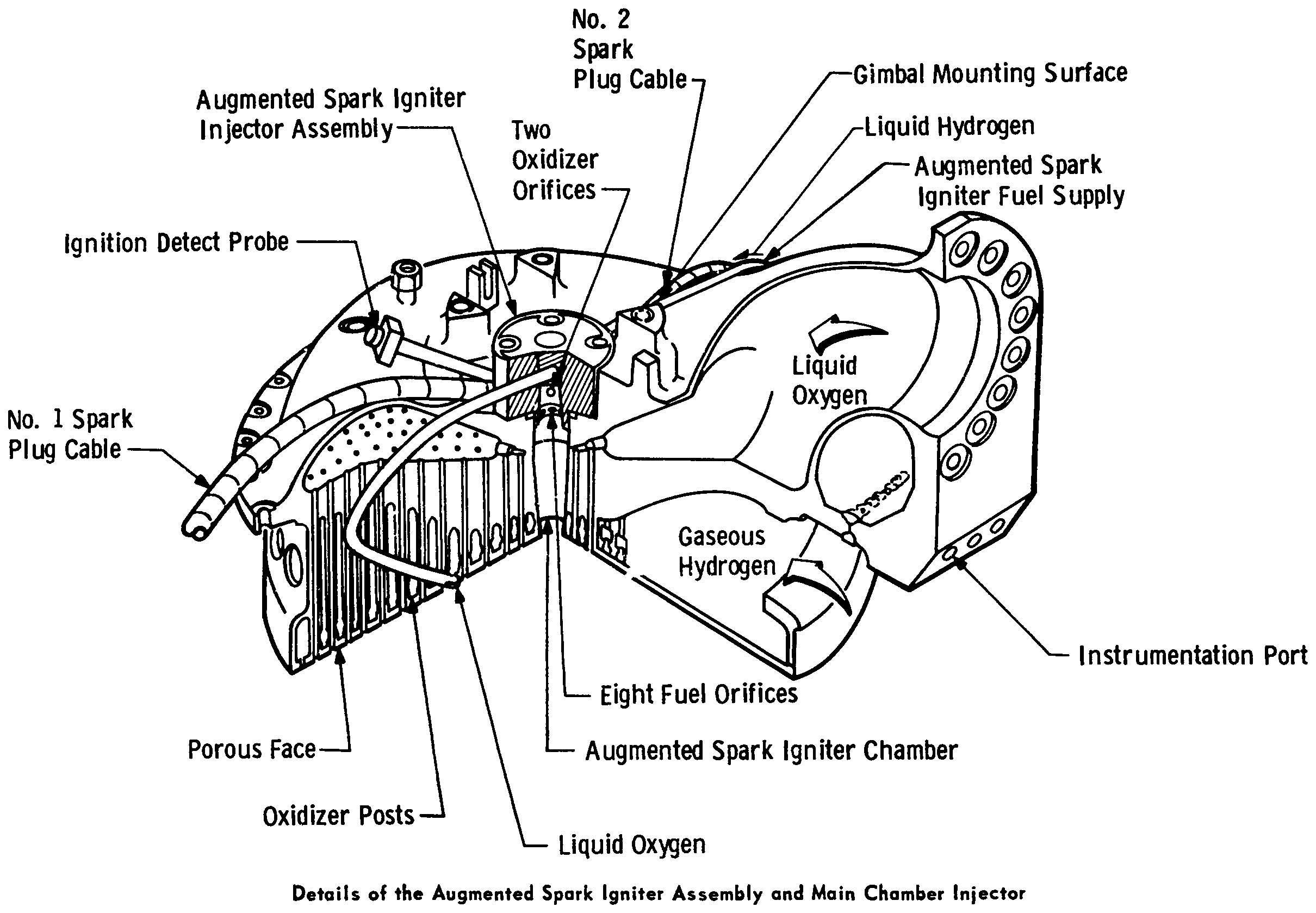
Apollo J-2 engine Augmented Spark Igniter (ASI). Rupture of an ASI liquid hydrogen fuel line caused an engine to shut down early on Apollo 6.

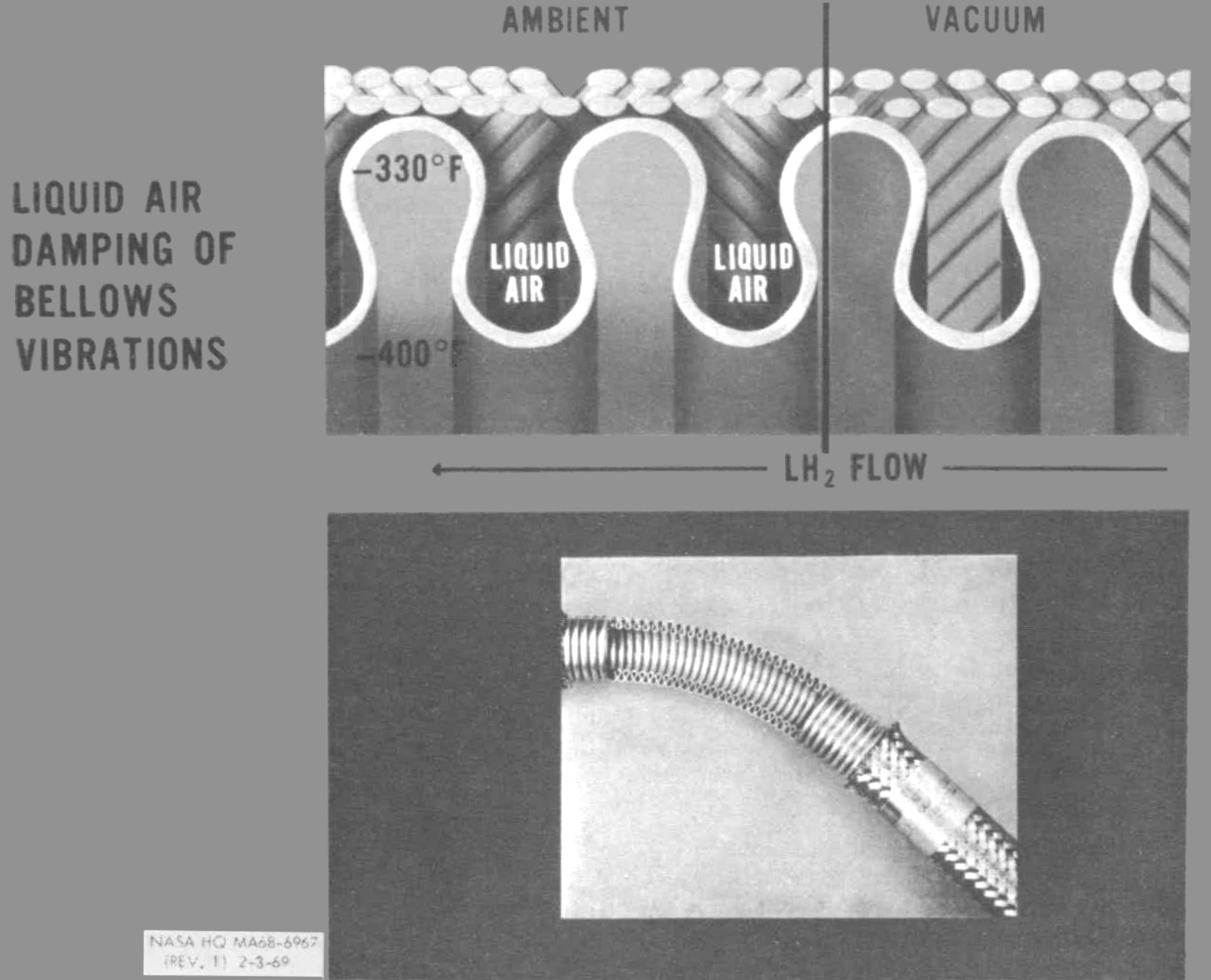
Liquid air damped bellows vibrations on ASI fuel line when the J-2 engines were tested at ground level. On Apollo 6, undamped vibrations in space caused a fuel line to fail,

In a post-launch press conference, Apollo Program Director Samuel C. Phillips said, "there's no question that it's less than a perfect mission", but added that the launch vehicle's reaching orbit despite the loss of two engines was "a major unplanned accomplishment". Mueller called Apollo 6 "a good job all around, an excellent launch, and, in balance, a successful mission ... and we have learned a great deal", but later stated that Apollo 6 "will have to be defined as a failure".

The phenomenon of pogo, experienced during the first stage of the flight, was well known. However, NASA thought that the Saturn V had been "detuned"—that is, prevented from vibrating at its natural frequencies. Soon after the Apollo 6 flight, NASA and its contractors sought to eliminate the problems for future flights, and about 1,000 government and industry engineers worked on the problem. To damp pressure oscillations in the F-1 and J-2 engines, cavities in valves leading to them were filled with helium gas shortly before takeoff as a shock absorber.

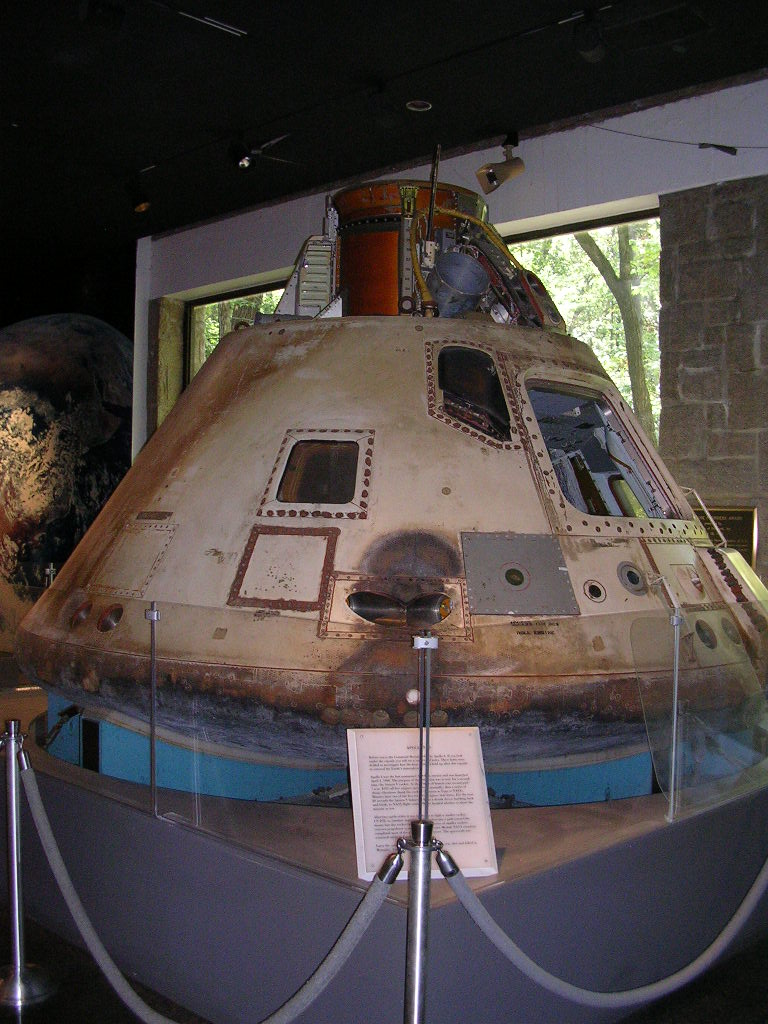
Apollo 6 command module on display at the Fernbank Science Center in Atlanta, Georgia

The problems with the S-II and the S-IVB were traced to the J-2 engines used in both stages. The J-2 had an augmented spark igniter (ASI) that allowed it to start and restart in space. The ASI was, in effect, a miniature rocket engine mounted in the top center of the J-2 engine. Cryogenic liquid propellent was fed into the ASI at a rate low enough to allow the mixture to be ignited by a spark plug. The ASI then produced a flame robust enough to ignite the large flow of fuel and oxidizer entering the engine at start up.

Post mission tests showed that the propellant lines feeding the ASI could fail in vacuum. The lines had a metal bellows section to allow for thermal expansion. In ground testing, the cold propellants passing through the lines would form a layer of frost on the LOX line and liquid air on the LH_{2} line, damping out vibrations. In the vacuum of space, there was no such protection from vibrations. On Apollo 6, the LH_{2} line to engine number 2's ASI failed, while the LOX line continued to feed liquid oxygen to the igniter. The excess oxygen injected into the hydrogen-rich combustion chamber produced a very high temperature in the igniter area, causing a burn-through of the engine dome. The resulting loss of pressure caused the Saturn Instrument Unit (IU) to send an engine shutdown signal. Due to a wiring error, the shutdown signal caused engine number 3 to shut down. Its loss of pressure initiated another shut down signal which, due to the same crosswiring, shutdown engine number 2. The remaining three engines continued to operate. A similar failure of igniter propellant lines likely prevented the single J-2 engine on the S-IVB from restarting.

For future missions, the bellows were replaced with rigid bends and the lines strengthened. In Apollo 6's wake, NASA engineers debated whether to configure the spacecraft's emergency detection system to automatically abort in the event of excessive pogo; this plan was opposed by Director of Flight Crew Operations Deke Slayton. Instead, work began on having a "pogo abort sensor" to allow the flight crew to judge whether to abort, but by August 1968, it had become clear that pogo could be dealt with without such a sensor, and work on it was abandoned.

The SLA problem was caused by its honeycomb structure. As the rocket accelerated through the atmosphere, the cells expanded due to trapped air and water, causing the adapter surface to break free. In response, engineers drilled small holes in the surface to allow trapped gases to dissipate, and placed a thin layer of cork on the adapter to help absorb moisture.

NASA's efforts were enough to satisfy the Senate Committee on Aeronautical and Space Sciences. In late April, the committee reported that the agency had quickly analyzed and diagnosed the abnormalities of Apollo 6, and had taken corrective action. After detailed analysis of the Saturn V's performance, and of the fixes for future launch vehicles, engineers at the Marshall Space Flight Center in Alabama concluded that a third uncrewed test flight of the Saturn V was unnecessary. Therefore, the next Saturn V to fly, on Apollo 8, would carry a crew (Apollo 7, the first crewed Apollo mission to fly, would be launched by a Saturn IB).

After the mission, CM-020 was transferred to the Smithsonian Institution. The Apollo 6 command module is on display at the Fernbank Science Center in Atlanta, Georgia.

== Cameras ==
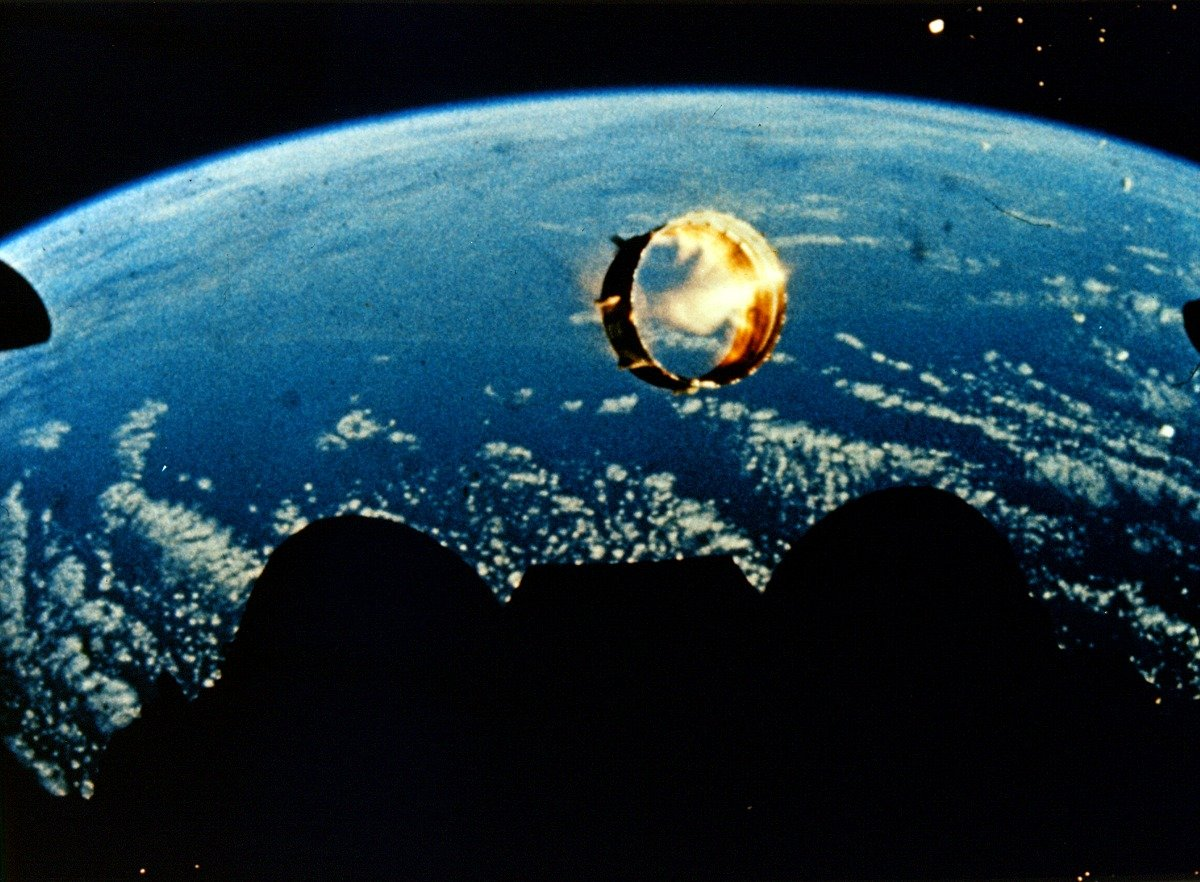
Still from footage of Apollo 6's interstage falling away (NASA)

The Saturn V had several cameras affixed to it, intended to be ejected and later recovered. Three of the four cameras on board the S-IC failed to eject and thus were destroyed, and only one of the two cameras on the S-II was recovered. Two of these cameras were intended to film the S-IC/S-II separation, and the other two were to film the liquid oxygen tank; the one that was recovered had filmed separation. The failure to eject was attributed to a lack of nitrogen pressure in the bottles that were to cause the ejection. The command module carried a motion picture camera, intended to be activated during launch and during re-entry. Because the mission took about ten minutes longer than planned, re-entry events were not filmed.

A 70 mm still camera operated in the CM during part of the mission, pointed at the Earth through the hatch window. Coverage included parts of the United States, the Atlantic Ocean, Africa, and the western Pacific Ocean. The camera had haze-penetrating film and filter combination, with better color balance and higher resolution than photographs taken on previous American crewed missions. These proved excellent for cartographic, topographic, and geographic studies.

== Public impact ==
There was little press coverage of the Apollo 6 mission mainly because, on the same day as the launch, Martin Luther King Jr. was assassinated in Memphis, and President Lyndon B. Johnson had announced he would not seek reelection only four days earlier.

== See also ==
- Splashdown (spacecraft landing) – Method of landing a spacecraft by parachute in a body of water

== Sources ==
- Apollo 6 Press Kit. Washington, D.C.: NASA. 1968.
- Apollo 6 Mission Report. Houston, Texas: NASA. 1968.
- Brooks, Courtney G.; Grimwood, James M.; Swenson, Loyd S. Jr. (1979). Chariots for Apollo: A History of Manned Lunar Spacecraft (PDF). NASA History Series. Washington, D.C.: Scientific and Technical Information Office, NASA. LCCN 79001042. NASA SP-4205.
- Orloff, Richard W.; Harland, David M. (2006). Apollo: The Definitive Sourcebook. Chichester, UK: Praxis Publishing Company. ISBN 978-0-387-30043-6.
