= Fernbank Observatory =

Observatory in Georgia, US

Dr. Ralph L. Buice, Jr. Observatory
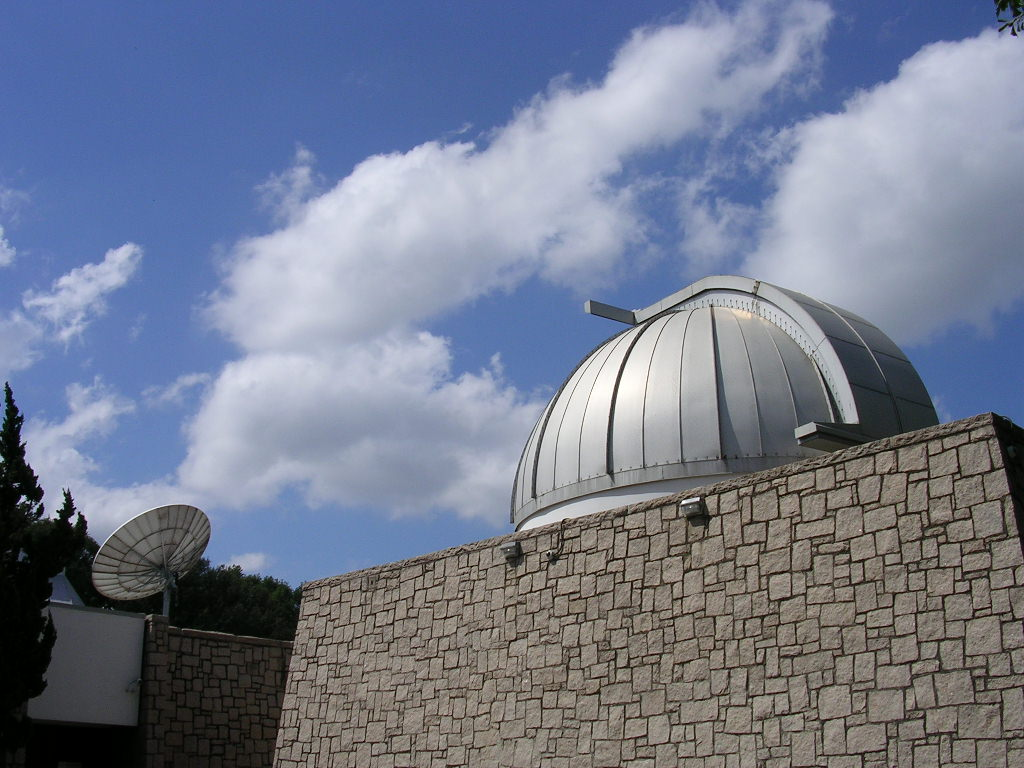
- Radio dish and dome for the optical telescope.
- Organization: Fernbank Science Center
- Location: Decatur, Georgia
- Coordinates: 33°46′44″N 84°19′5″W
- Altitude: 323 meters (1,060 ft)
- Website: Fernbank Observatory

Telescopes
- Tinsley: 0.9 m reflector
- radio telescope: 3.0 m parabolic dish
- Related media on Commons

Dr. Ralph L. Buice, Jr. Observatory is an astronomical observatory owned and operated by the Fernbank Science Center. It is located between Decatur and Atlanta, Georgia (USA). The observatory owns a 0.9144 m (36.00 in) Cassegrain telescope housed beneath a 10 m (33 ft) dome.

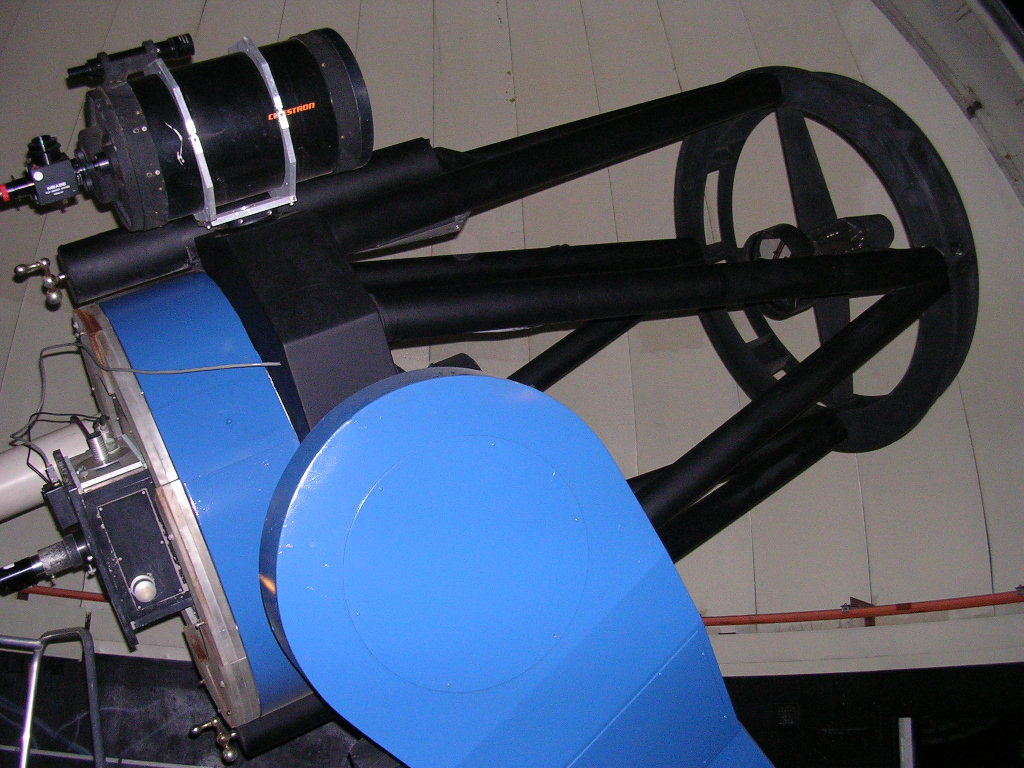
0.9 meter Cassegrain

== See also ==
- List of observatories
