= Fernbank Science Center =

Science museum in Atlanta, Georgia, USA

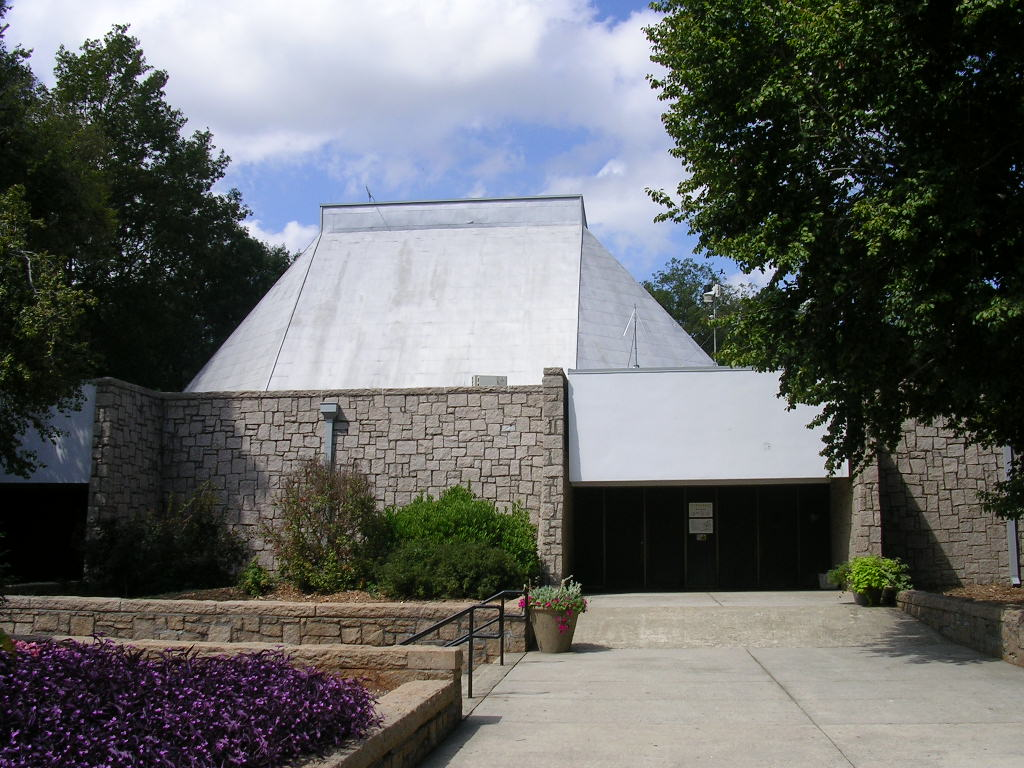
- Fernbank Science Center in 2007

- Location within Atlanta
- Established: 1967; 59 years ago
- Location: 156 Heaton Park Drive NE; Atlanta; United States
- Coordinates: 33.77855°N 84.318089°W
- Type: Science museum
- Director: Douglas Hrabe
- Owner: DeKalb County School District
- Website: fernbank.edu

The Fernbank Science Center is a museum, classroom, and woodland complex located in Atlanta. It is owned and operated by the DeKalb County School District, which announced in May 2012 it was considering closing the facility to cut its annual budget, then quickly shelved the plan after public outcry. The nearby Fernbank Museum of Natural History is a private non-profit organization that is separate from the Science Center.

== Overview ==
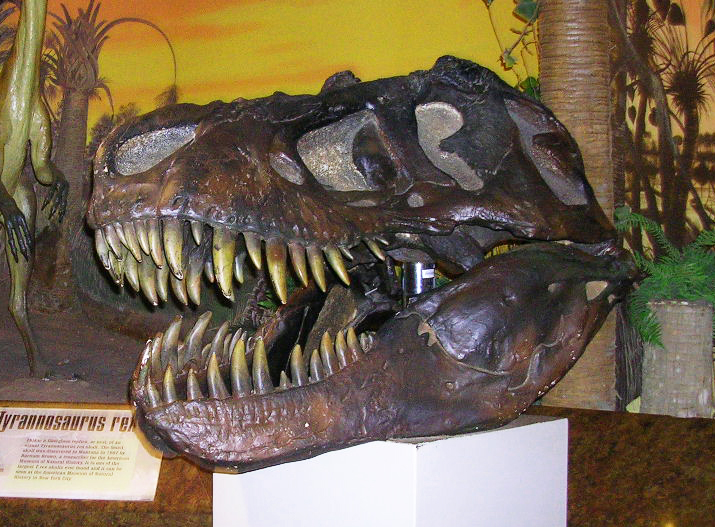
Dinosaur diorama exhibit is just one of the many educational exhibits on display.

The Fernbank Science Center opened in December 1967, and is an educational facility and an integral part of the DeKalb County School District. It provides programs for the science education of local students, pre-K-12. Both its planetarium and observatory are open for public shows on specific occasions.

The mission of the Science Center is to provide and promote an understanding of science and technology and to communicate to its visitors the harmony and order of the natural world. Fernbank contains many materials for instruction, including dinosaur skeletons, rocks and minerals, a collection of tektites, an Aeronautics Education Laboratory and an electron microscope lab. The center also has an authentic Apollo spacecraft from the unmanned 1968 Apollo 6 Saturn V test flight, and is home to a planetarium with a 70-foot (21 m)-diameter projection dome.

== Jim Cherry Memorial Planetarium ==
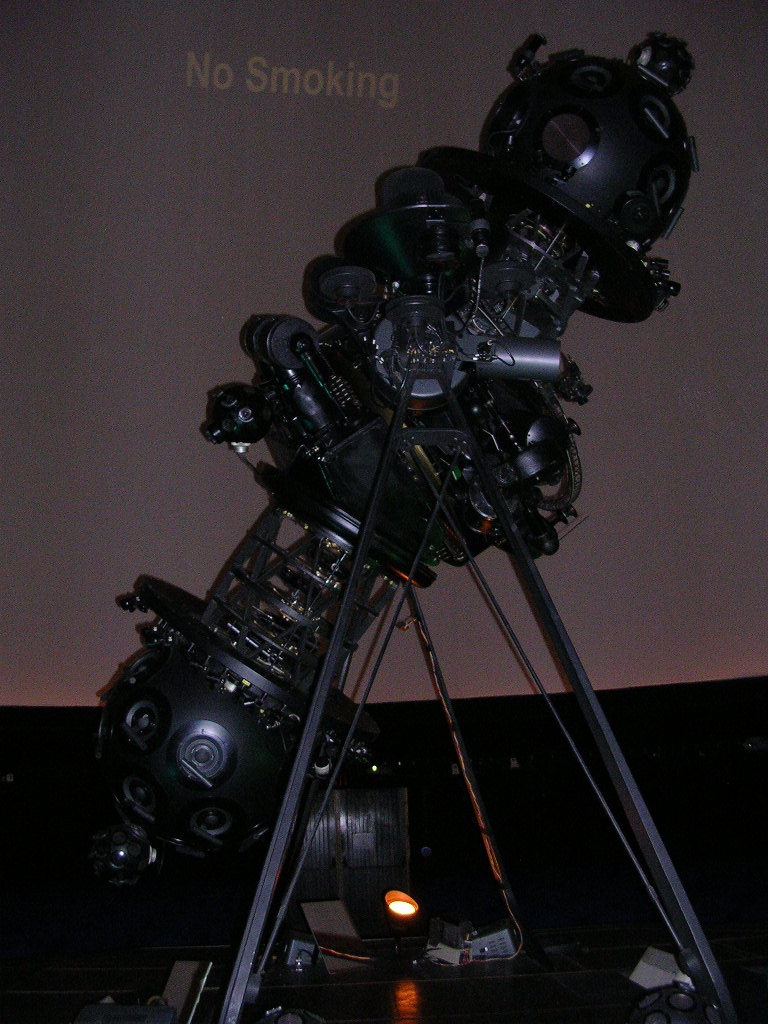
Jim Cherry Memorial Planetarium.

The Jim Cherry Memorial Planetarium is a 500-seat celestial theater in the round, equipped with a 70-foot (21 m), a Mark V Zeiss projector, and over 100 special effects projectors. The planetarium, which was built in the 1960s, is the largest planetarium within the state of Georgia and one of the largest in the U.S. It was also the first planetarium to be owned and operated by a public school system in the United States of America.

In 2012 Fernbank Science Center was the recipient of a grant from Lockheed Martin which was used to refurbish the Jim Cherry Memorial Planetarium, and give the theater a technological upgrade bringing it into the 21st century and the digital age. A major component of technological upgrade is the fulldome/immersive projection system, produced by e-Planetarium of Houston. The fulldome system is intended to complement the planetarium's iconic Zeiss star projector not replace it.

Prior to the 2012 upgrade, Fernbank staff had been using standard projectors for the video portions of the shows, which put an image on only a small segment of the dome. Since the upgrade, a digital immersive projection system throws extraordinarily bright light onto a spherical mirror tuned to the exact shape of the planetarium dome so video and other images cover the entire dome. Before the upgrade, science center staff had the capability to project images like a slide show. Since the 2012 upgrade, animated images can move across the entire surface.

== Robotics Team ==
Fernbank LINKS (Linking Ideas and Networking Kids with Science) was established in 2002. Since then, the robotics team has participated in two robotics competitions, while winning many awards. All of their members graduate high school and pursue a college degree.

In the fall, Fernbank LINKS competes in and hosts the free Georgia BEST Robotics Competition. During their original tenure from 2004-2014, LINKS had been one of the more successful BEST Teams in Georgia, consistently qualifying for the South's BEST Regional Championship at Auburn University. However, in 2015, they forfeited their chance to compete in order to host the Georgia BEST hub. Under their leadership, 12 BEST teams competed, with 2 qualifying for the South's BEST Regional Championship. In 2016, LINKS plans to expand the Georgia BEST hub to 24 teams, thus allowing more teams to experience the fun of STEM.

In the spring, Fernbank LINKS competes in the FIRST Robotics Competition. Like the BEST Robotics Competition, teams are challenged to build a robot in 6 weeks. Following the main build season, teams prepare for and compete in competitions to advance to the FIRST Championship. In 2016, Fernbank LINKS became the first team in Georgia to win a district qualifier. They also became the first team from DeKalb County to win the Engineering Inspiration Award at the Peachtree District State Championship, qualifying them for the FIRST Championship in St. Louis as part of the Tesla Division. At the FIRST Championship, they were ranked #16 out of 75 teams, but were eliminated in quarterfinal play.

During the Fall and Winter, LINKS has been heavily involved with the FIRST Lego League Challenge. Every Fall, LINKS hosts 6 free trainings for FLL teams in DeKalb County. In addition, they host the DeKalb FLL Regional Tournament and the Atlanta Super Regional tournament.

== Gallery ==
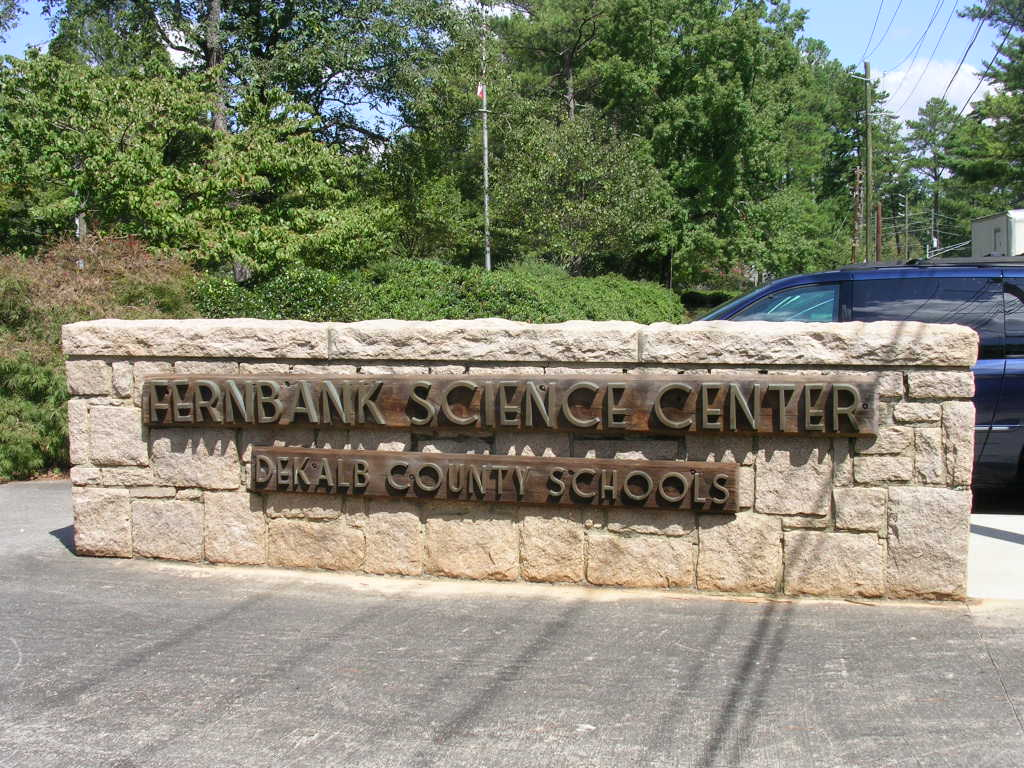
Main sign in front of science center.

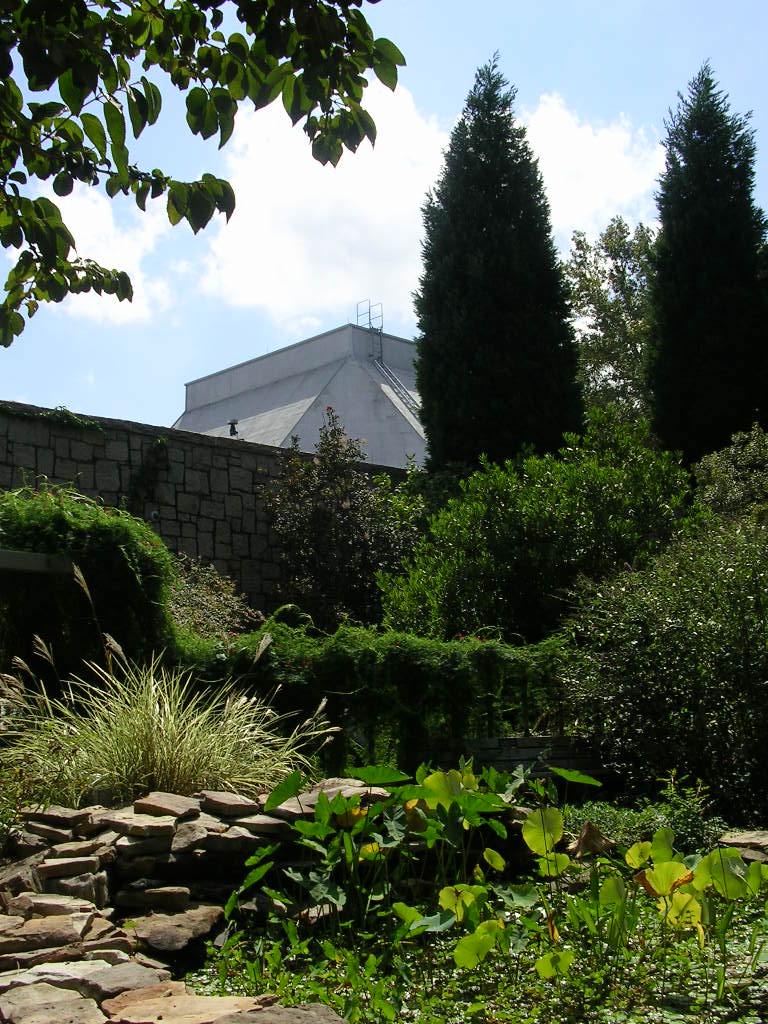
Home composting demonstration site.

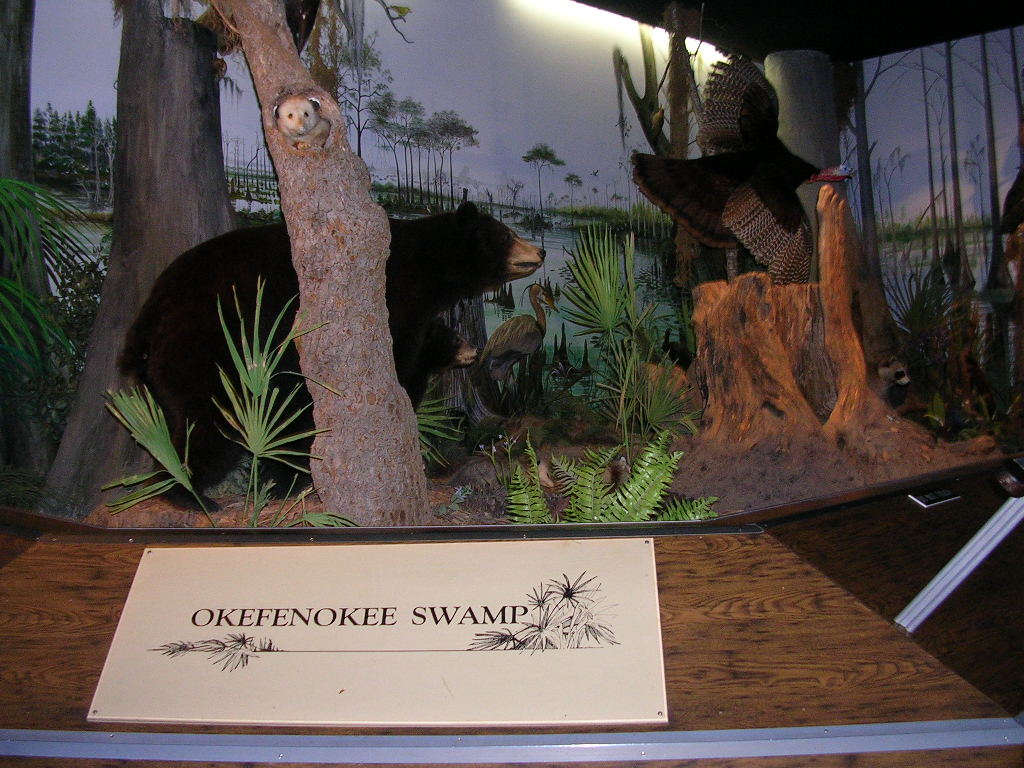
Okefenokee Swamp diorama exhibit.

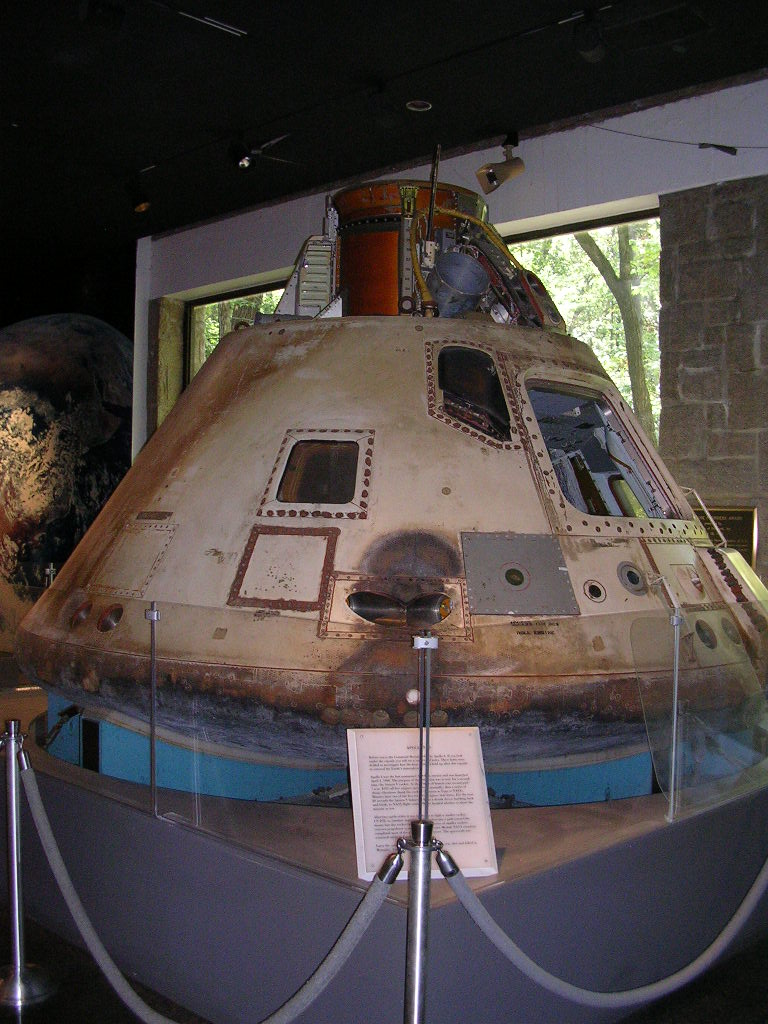
NASA Apollo 6 Command Module.

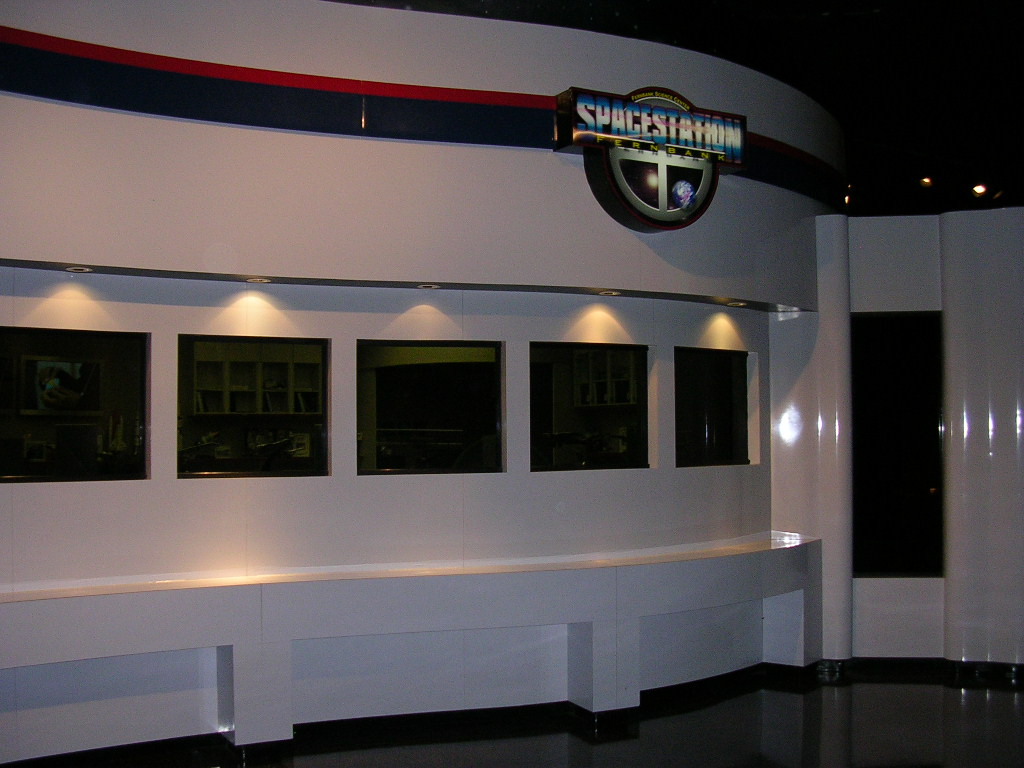
Aerospace Education Laboratory.

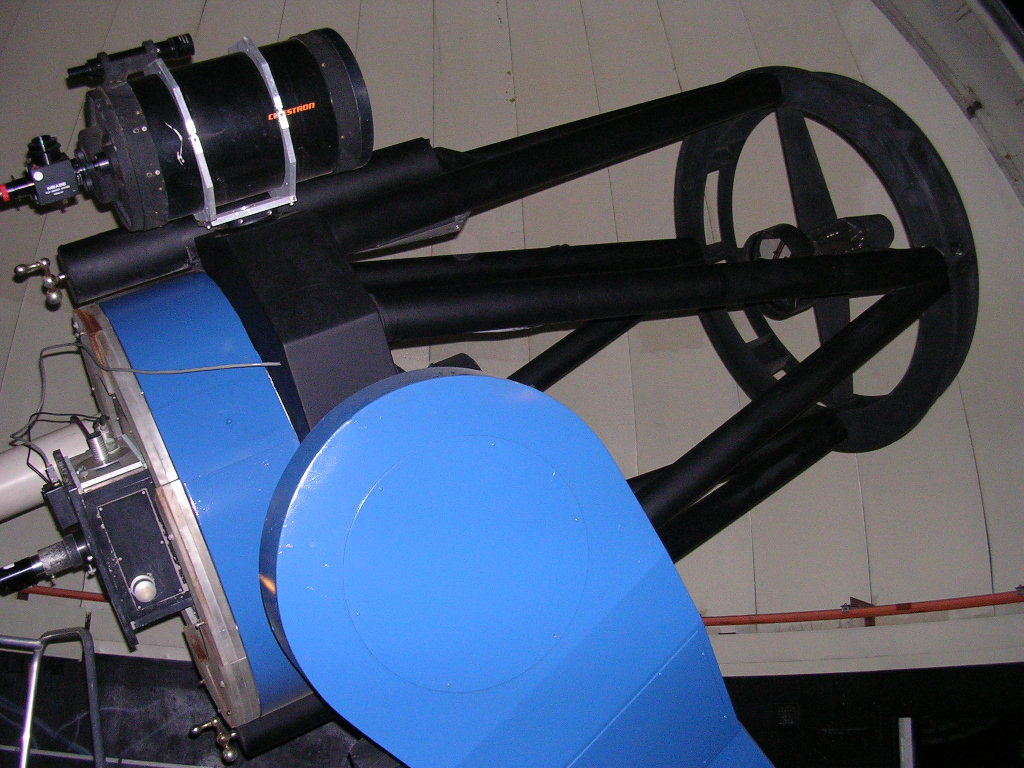
Dr. Ralph L. Buice Jr. Observatory.

== See also ==
- List of botanical gardens and arboretums in the United States
- List of science museums
- Apollo 6
- Fernbank Forest
- Fernbank Observatory
