= Fernbank Museum of Natural History =

Natural history museum in Atlanta, Georgia, USA

Coordinates: 33°46′26″N 84°19′39″W

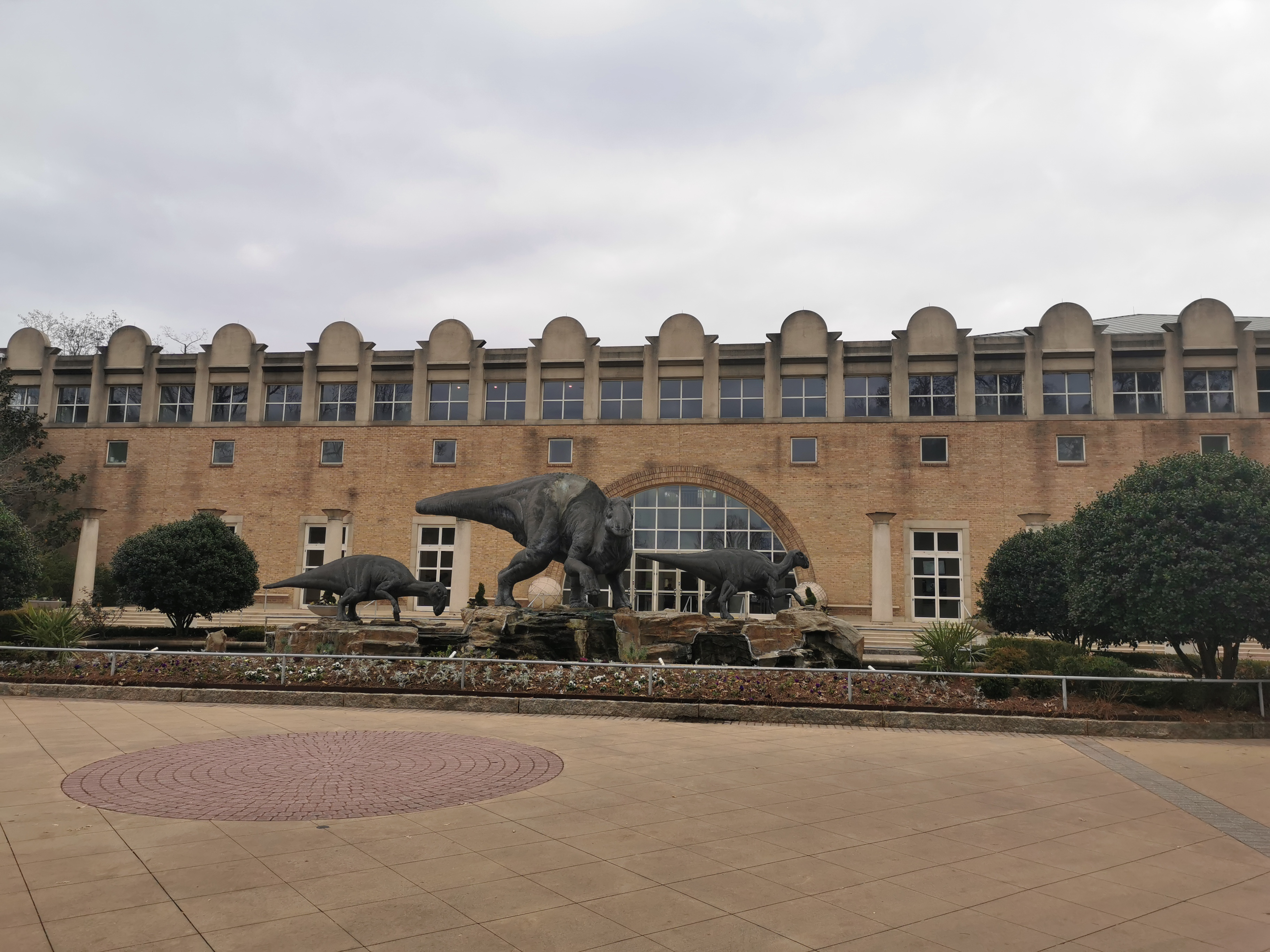
- Fernbank Museum in 2019
- Established: October 5, 1992
- Location: 767 Clifton Road NE; Atlanta
- Type: Natural History
- Director: Jennifer Grant Warner
- Website: fernbankmuseum.org

Fernbank Museum of Natural History, in Atlanta, Georgia, is a museum that presents exhibitions and programming about natural history. The museum has a number of permanent exhibitions and regularly hosts temporary exhibitions in its expansive facility, designed by Graham Gund Architects. Giants of the Mesozoic, on display in the atrium of Fernbank Museum, features a 123-foot (37 m) long Argentinosaurus, the largest dinosaur ever described; as well as a Giganotosaurus. The permanent exhibition, A Walk Through Time in Georgia, tells the twofold story of Georgia's natural history and the development of the planet. Fernbank Museum has won several national and international awards for one of its newest permanent exhibitions, Fernbank NatureQuest, an immersive, interactive exhibition for children that was designed and produced by Thinkwell Group. The awards NatureQuest has won include the 2012 Thea Award for Outstanding Achievement for a Museum Exhibit and the 2011 Bronze Award for Best Museum Environment from Event Design. The nearby Fernbank Science Center is a separate organization operated by the DeKalb County Board of Education and is not affiliated with Fernbank Museum of Natural History (Fernbank, Inc.).

== History ==
In the late 1800s, an environmentalist named Emily Harrison grew up in an area east of Atlanta which she called "Fernbank". Along with others, Harrison created a charter for Fernbank in 1938 and purchased the 70 acres (280,000 m^{2}) of woodland on which Fernbank Museum now stands. In 1964, the Fernbank trustees and the DeKalb County School System created Fernbank Science Center, which led to a desire to share Fernbank's resources with the general public.

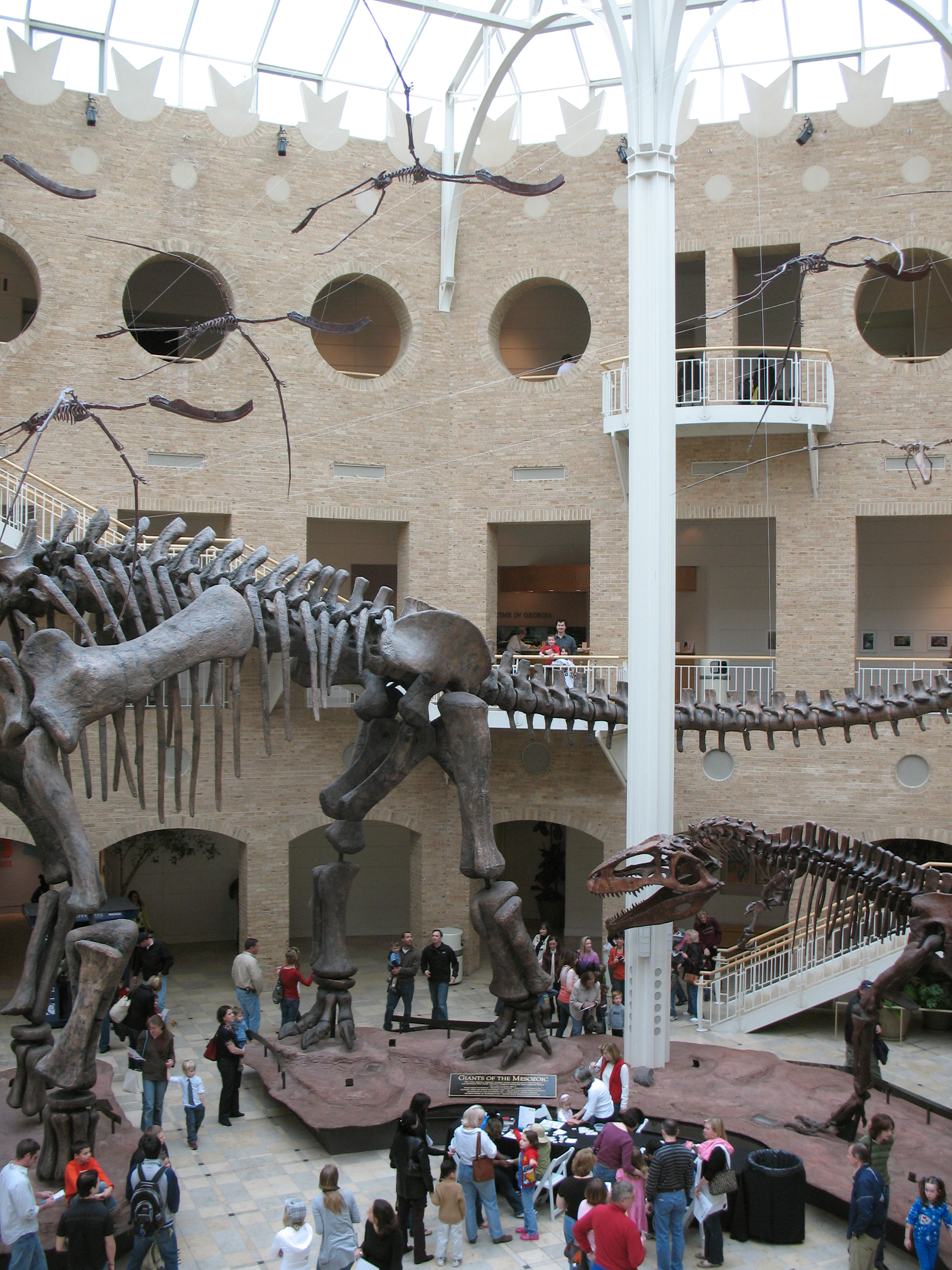
Inside Fernbank in 2009

Following master planning and designs by the Cambridge, Massachusetts-based architectural firm, Graham Gund Architects, ground was broken in 1989, and on October 5, 1992, Fernbank Museum of Natural History opened to the public. The new building is located behind a row of historic houses, and features a glass-enclosed atrium overlooking Fernbank Forest. Fernbank Museum now stands on 65 acres (260,000 m^{2}) of the largest old-growth urban Piedmont forest in the country.

In August 2025, the museum announced the completion of a $27 million capital campaign, which will fund a new permanent exhibit, expanded galleries, interactive learning spaces, and significant accessibility improvements across the 120-acre campus.

== Exhibits ==
Fernbank Museum offers a variety of exhibits exploring many different natural history topics. Exhibits include:

- Fernbank NatureQuest
- Dinosaur Plaza
- Giants of the Mesozoic
- A Walk Through Time in Georgia
- Reflections of Culture
- Conveyed in Clay: Stories from St. Catherines Island
- Our Favorite Things
- World of Shells
- Fantastic Forces
- Sky High
- Star Gallery
- STEAM Lab

The museum also has an area where special exhibitions are cycled through. These exhibits tend to stay open to the public for 2–4 months each.

=== Outdoor exhibits ===
In 2016, the museum opened WildWoods, an accessible 10-acre area located directly behind the museum with trails and interactive exhibits. In 2016 Fernbank also opened access to the newly restored, 65-acre Fernbank Forest.

== Giant screen theatre ==
Fernbank is home to the Rankin M. Smith, Sr. Giant Screen Theater. Formerly an IMAX theater, upgrades were completed in February 2017 including a digital 4K 3D laser-illuminated projection system.

== Special programming ==
Fernbank puts on special activities for adults and children including camps, lectures, workshops, interactive conversations, family activity days, and storytelling.

One of Fernbank's most popular events, Fernbank After Dark runs the second Friday of each month and features hands-on educational activities, drinks, food and live music.

=== FYI Volunteer Program ===
Fernbank Museum offers a year-round volunteer program for teens aged 13–17. FYI (Fernbank Youth Interpreter) Volunteers interact with museum guests while working on educational carts throughout the museum, exploring a wide range of natural history topics, including Archaeology, Paleontology, Anatomy, and more.

== See also ==
- Fernbank Forest
- Fernbank Science Center
- List of natural history museums
