= Fernbank Forest =

Mature forest in Fernbank Museum of Natural History

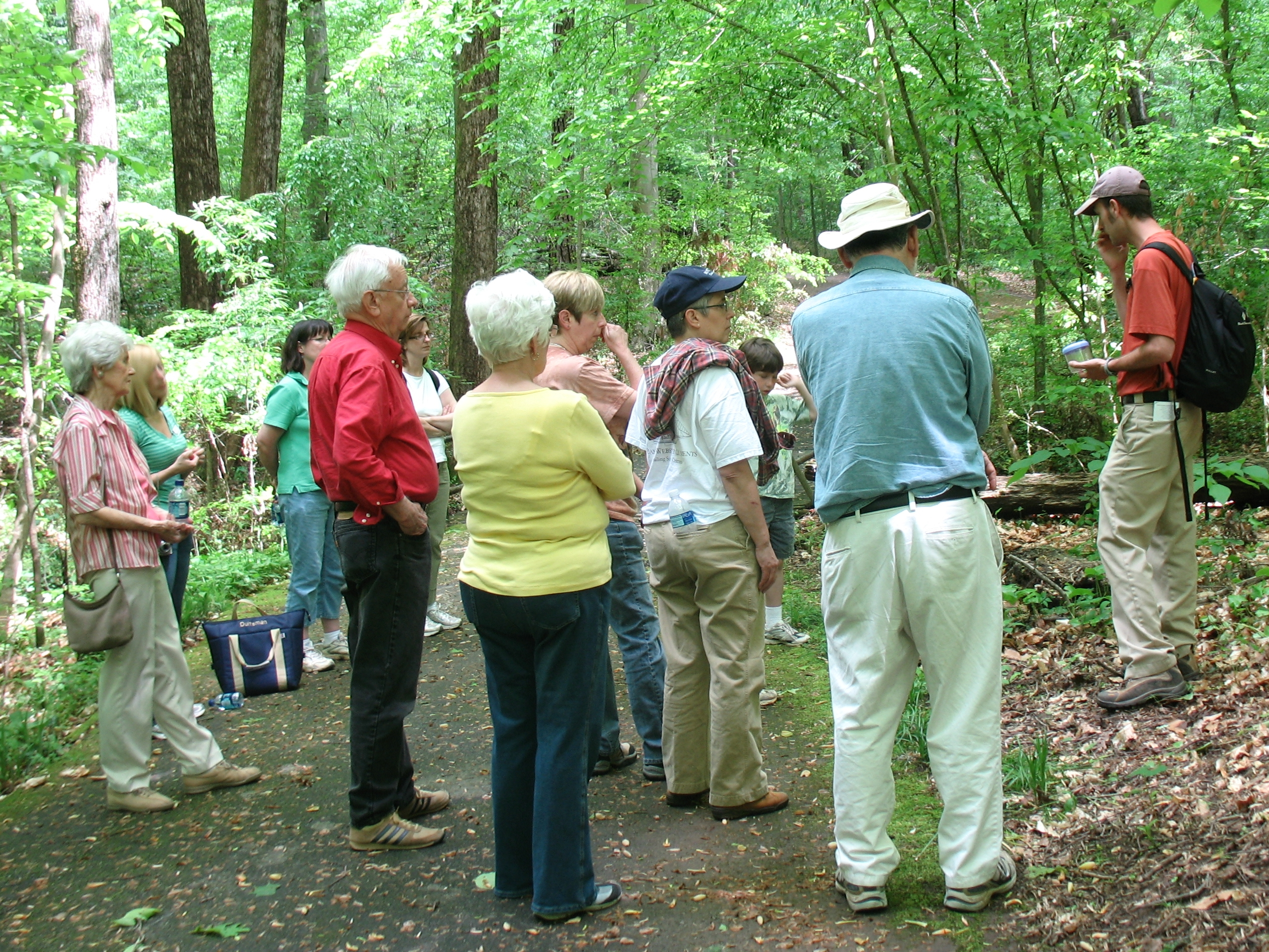
- Tour at Fernbank Forest
- Interactive map of Fernbank Forest

Geography
- Location: DeKalb, Atlanta Georgia, USA
- Coordinates: 33.77622°N 84.32307°W
- Area: 65 acres (26 ha)

Administration
- Established: 1937; 89 years ago
- Authority: Fernbank Museum of Natural History
- Website: www.fernbankmuseum.org

Ecology
- Ecosystem: Mature Urban Forest

Fernbank Forest is a 65-acre (25 hectares) mature mixed forest that is part of Fernbank Museum of Natural History in Atlanta, Georgia. It has some relatively old trees compared to much of the forests in the Piedmont; as such, it has been extensively studied by scientists. Large specimens of white oak and tulip poplar, which grow up to 156 feet (48 meters) tall, can be found along one slope within the forest. There also are a few equally tall loblolly pine. Other canopy species include American beech, black oak, northern red oak, southern red oak, pignut hickory, bitternut hickory, mockernut hickory, winged elm and red maple. Eastern flowering dogwood, sourwood, umbrella magnolia and eastern redbud are prominent among the smaller trees. The forest floor is covered by many shrub, wildflower and fern species.

Native animals include many mammals, such as the secretive bobcat, occasional sightings of black bear, as well as the more commonly seen eastern chipmunk, eastern coyote, eastern gray squirrel, hoary bat, North American river otter, raccoon, Virginia opossum and white-tailed deer. Birds include American crow and pileated woodpecker. Reptiles include the broad-headed and five-lined skink, eastern box turtle, snapping turtle, and several snake species, such as the venomous (but generally timid) eastern copperhead, as well as DeKay's brown snake, common garter snake, common watersnake, and the diminutive eastern wormsnake and ring-necked snake. Additionally, the forest is home to several species of amphibians, including many salamanders, such as the Chattooga and spotted dusky, northern slimy, red, southern red-backed and two-lined, spotted and Talladega seal salamanders, as well as American bullfrogs, Cope's gray treefrog and green frogs.

The soils are mostly well-drained, with medium-brown or dark, reddish-brown, sandy loam topsoils. Most subsoils are clay loam or clay; they are medium-red or dark-red. The darker and richer soils, mostly mapped as Gwinnett series, have developed on mafic rock or, with Hiwassee series, a mix of mafic and felsic substrates.; medium-toned soils such as Cecil, Pacolet, Sweetapple and Grover series are on felsic rock.

== History ==
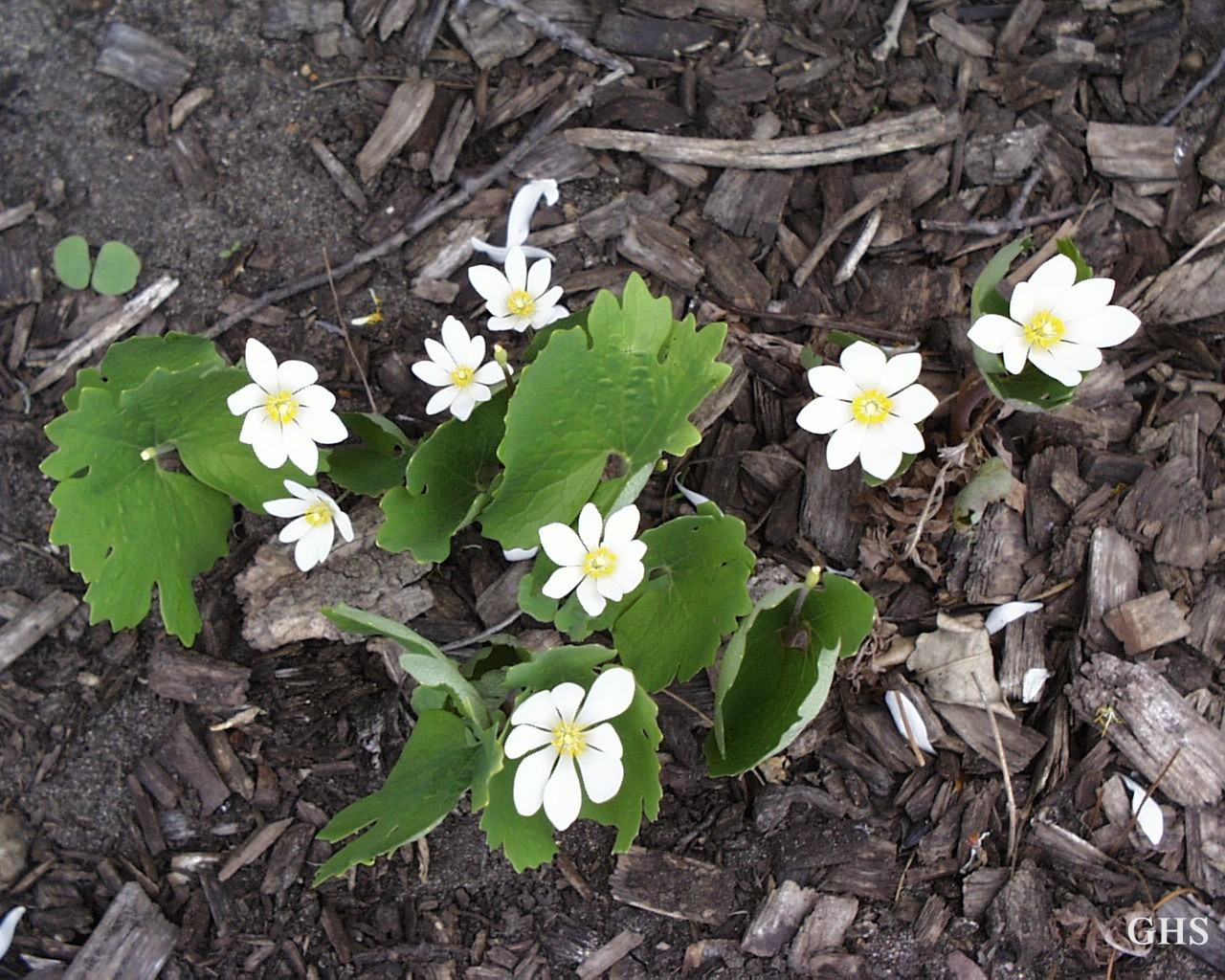
Bloodroot, Sanguinaria canadensis

Fernbank Forest was purchased from Col. Z. D. Harrison in 1939 by a group of citizens who organized Fernbank, Inc., which today operates as Fernbank Museum of Natural History for the conservation and preservation of this old-growth forest to inspire and teach about nature. Fernbank is the 4th oldest environmental conservation not-for-profit in the United States. In 1964 the Fernbank Trustees developed a 48-year lease which was accepted by the DeKalb County Board of Education, agreeing to manage and maintain the forest in exchange for offering free access to the public. The lease was renewable in eight-year intervals for a maximum of 48 years.

=== Controversy 2012–2014 ===
The transfer of the lease from Dekalb County School System in 2012 led to the closing of the forest and subsequent controversy. At the time, self-guided tours were not allowed in the forest due to safety concerns. A Move-On petition garnered over 500 signatures to allow public access to the Forest. Concerned community members claimed the forest was not being maintained, leading to a possible reduction of educational opportunities in the forest for local school children. Community members were concerned about the lack of transparency since none of the plans were initially made public.

=== Forest reopens ===
In September 2016, after a 4-year restoration period, the forest reopened as part of the Fernbank Museum of Natural History. Visitors to the museum can join guided tours with museum educators or go on self-guided tours along the paths of the forest. The museum now offers outdoor educational programming for students in the metro Atlanta area.

== See also ==
- Fernbank Museum of Natural History
- Fernbank Science Center
