= List of amphibians of Virginia =

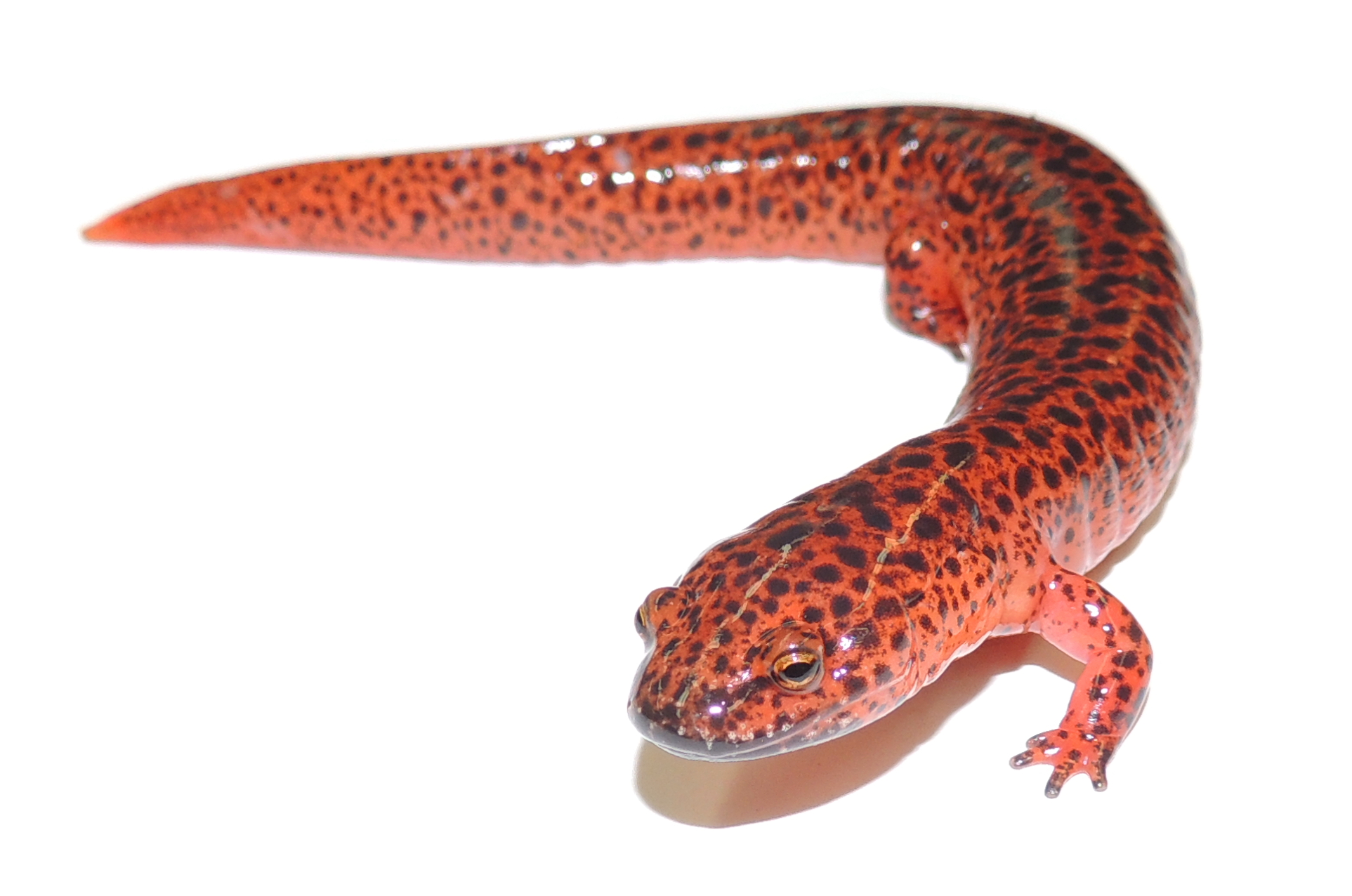
The red salamander (Pseudotriton ruber) is the state amphibian of Virginia

This is a list of amphibians native to the state of Virginia. Species which are endemic to Virginia are bolded.

== Anura (frogs and toads) ==
Name	Species / Subspecies	Family	Conservation status	
Name	Species / Subspecies	Family	IUCN Red List	State (NatureServe)
American toad	Anaxyrus americanus americanus	Bufonidae		Secure (S5)
Fowler's toad	Anaxyrus fowleri	Bufonidae		Secure (S5)
Oak toad	Anaxyrus quercicus	Bufonidae		Vulnerable (S3)
Southern toad	Anaxyrus terrestris	Bufonidae		Apparently Secure (S4)
Eastern cricket frog	Acris crepitans crepitans	Hylidae		Apparently Secure (S4)
Southern cricket frog	Acris gryllus	Hylidae		Apparently Secure (S4)
Cope's gray tree frog	Dryophrytes chrysoscelis	Hylidae		Secure (S5)
Green tree frog	Dryophrytes cinereus	Hylidae		Apparently Secure (S4)
Pine woods tree frog	Dryophrytes femoralis	Hylidae		Apparently Secure (S4)
Barking tree frog	Dryophrytes gratiosus	Hylidae		Imperiled (S2)
Squirrel tree frog	Dryophrytes squirellus	Hylidae		Apparently Secure (S4)
Gray tree frog	Dryophrytes versicolor	Hylidae		Secure (S5)
Appalachian mountain chorus frog	Pseudacris brachyphona	Hylidae		Apparently Secure (S4)
Brimley's chorus frog	Pseudacris brimleyi	Hylidae		Apparently Secure (S4)
Spring peeper	Pseudacris crucifer	Hylidae		Secure (S5)
Upland chorus frog	Pseudacris feriarum	Hylidae		Secure (S5)
New Jersey chorus frog	Pseudacris kalmi	Hylidae		
Southern chorus frog	Pseudacris nigrita	Hylidae		Vulnerable (S3)
Little grass frog	Pseudacris ocularis	Hylidae		Vulnerable (S3)
Eastern narrow-mouthed toad	Gastrophryne carolinensis	Microhylidae		Apparently Secure (S4)
American bullfrog	Lithobates catesbeianus	Ranidae		Secure (S5)
Northern green frog	Lithobates clamitans melanota	Ranidae		Secure (S5)
Atlantic coast leopard frog	Lithobates kauffeldi	Ranidae		
Pickerel frog	Lithobates palustris	Ranidae		Secure (S5)
Southern leopard frog	Lithobates sphenocephalus utricularius	Ranidae		Apparently Secure (S4)
Wood frog	Lithobates sylvaticus	Ranidae		Secure (S5)
Carpenter frog	Lithobates virgatipes	Ranidae		Vulnerable (S3)
Eastern spadefoot toad	Scaphiopus holbrooki	Scaphiopodidae		Apparently Secure (S4)

== Salamanders ==
=== Lungless salamanders (Plethodontidae) ===
Name	Species / Subspecies	Conservation status			
Name	Species / Subspecies	IUCN Red List	Federal (ESA)	State (Virginia DWR)	State (NatureServe)
Green salamander	Aneides aeneus				Vulnerable (S3)
Holbrook's southern dusky salamander	Desmognathus auriculatus				Apparently Secure (S4)
Northern dusky salamander	Desmognathus fuscus				Secure (S5)
Kanawha black-bellied salamander	Desmognathus kanawha				
Shovel-nosed salamander	Desmognathus marmoratus				Critically Imperiled (S1)
Pisgah black-bellied salamander	Desmognathus mavrokoilius				
Seal salamander	Desmognathus monticola				Secure (S5)
Allegheny Mountain dusky salamander	Desmognathus ochrophaeus				Apparently Secure (S4)
Blue Ridge dusky salamander	Desmognathus orestes				Vulnerable (S3)
Northern pygmy salamander	Desmognathus organi				Imperiled (S2)
**Flat-headed salamander**	**Desmognathus planiceps**				Vulnerable (G3)
Black Mountain dusky salamander	Desmognathus welteri				Vulnerable (S3)
Northern two-lined salamander	Eurycea bislineata				Secure (S5)
Southern two-lined salamander	Eurycea cirrigera				Secure (S5)
Three-lined salamander	Eurycea guttolineata				Apparently Secure (S4)
Eastern long-tailed salamander	Eurycea longicauda longicauda				Secure (S5)
Cave salamander	Eurycea lucifuga				Apparently Secure (S4)
Blue Ridge two-lined salamander	Eurycea wilderae				Imperiled (S2)
Spring salamander	Gyrinophilus porphyriticus				Secure (S5)
Four-toed salamander	Hemidactylium scutatum				Secure (S5)
Atlantic Coast slimy salamander	Plethodon chlorobryonis				
Eastern red-backed salamander	Plethodon cinereus				Secure (S5)
White-spotted slimy salamander	Plethodon cylindraceus				Secure (S5)
**Dixie Caverns salamander**	**Plethodon dixi**				Critically Imperiled (G1)
Northern slimy salamander	Plethodon glutinosus				Secure (S5)
Valley and ridge salamander	Plethodon hoffmani				Apparently Secure (S4)
**Peaks of Otter salamander**	**Plethodon hubrichti**				Imperiled (G2)
Blacksburg salamander	Plethodon jacksoni				
Cumberland Plateau salamander	Plethodon kentucki				Vulnerable (S3)
Northern gray-cheeked salamander	Plethodon montanus				Vulnerable (S3)
Cow Knob salamander	Plethodon punctatus				Imperiled (S2)
Southern ravine salamander	Plethodon richmondi				Apparently Secure (S4)
**Shenandoah salamander**	**Plethodon shenandoah**		Endangered	State Endangered	Critically Imperiled (G1)
**Big Levels salamander**	**Plethodon sherando**				Imperiled (G2)
Southern zigzag salamander	Plethodon ventralis				Critically Imperiled (S1)
Shenandoah Mountain salamander	Plethodon virginia				Imperiled (S2)
Wehrle's salamander	Plethodon wehrlei				Apparently Secure (S4)
Weller's salamander	Plethodon welleri				Imperiled (S2)
Yonahlossee salamander	Plethodon yonahlossee				Vulnerable (S3)
Mud salamander	Pseudotriton montanus				Secure (S5)
Red salamander	Pseudotriton ruber				Secure (S5)
Many-lined salamander	Stereochilus marginatus				Vulnerable (S3)

=== Other salamanders ===
Name	Species / Subspecies	Family	Conservation status		
Name	Species / Subspecies	Family	IUCN Red List	State (Virginia DWR)	State (NatureServe)
Jefferson salamander	Ambystoma jeffersonianum	Ambystomatidae			Apparently Secure (S4)
Mabee's salamander	Ambystoma mabeei	Ambystomatidae		State Threatened	Critically Imperiled (S1)
Spotted salamander	Ambystoma maculatum	Ambystomatidae			Secure (S5)
Marbled salamander	Ambystoma opacum	Ambystomatidae			Secure (S5)
Mole salamander	Ambystoma talpoideum	Ambystomatidae			Imperiled (S2)
Eastern tiger salamander	Ambystoma tigrinum	Ambystomatidae		State Endangered	Critically Imperiled (S1)
Two-toed amphiuma	Amphiuma means	Amphiumidae			Apparently Secure (S4)
Eastern hellbender	Cryptobranchus alleganiensis alleganiensis	Cryptobranchidae			Imperiled (S2)
Common mudpuppy	Necturus maculosus maculosus	Proteidae			Imperiled (S2)
Dwarf waterdog	Necturus punctatus	Proteidae			Imperiled (S2)
Eastern newt	Notophthalmus viridescens viridescens	Salamandridae			Secure (S5)
Eastern lesser siren	Siren intermedia intermedia	Sirenidae			
Greater siren	Siren lacertina	Sirenidae			Vulnerable (S3)
