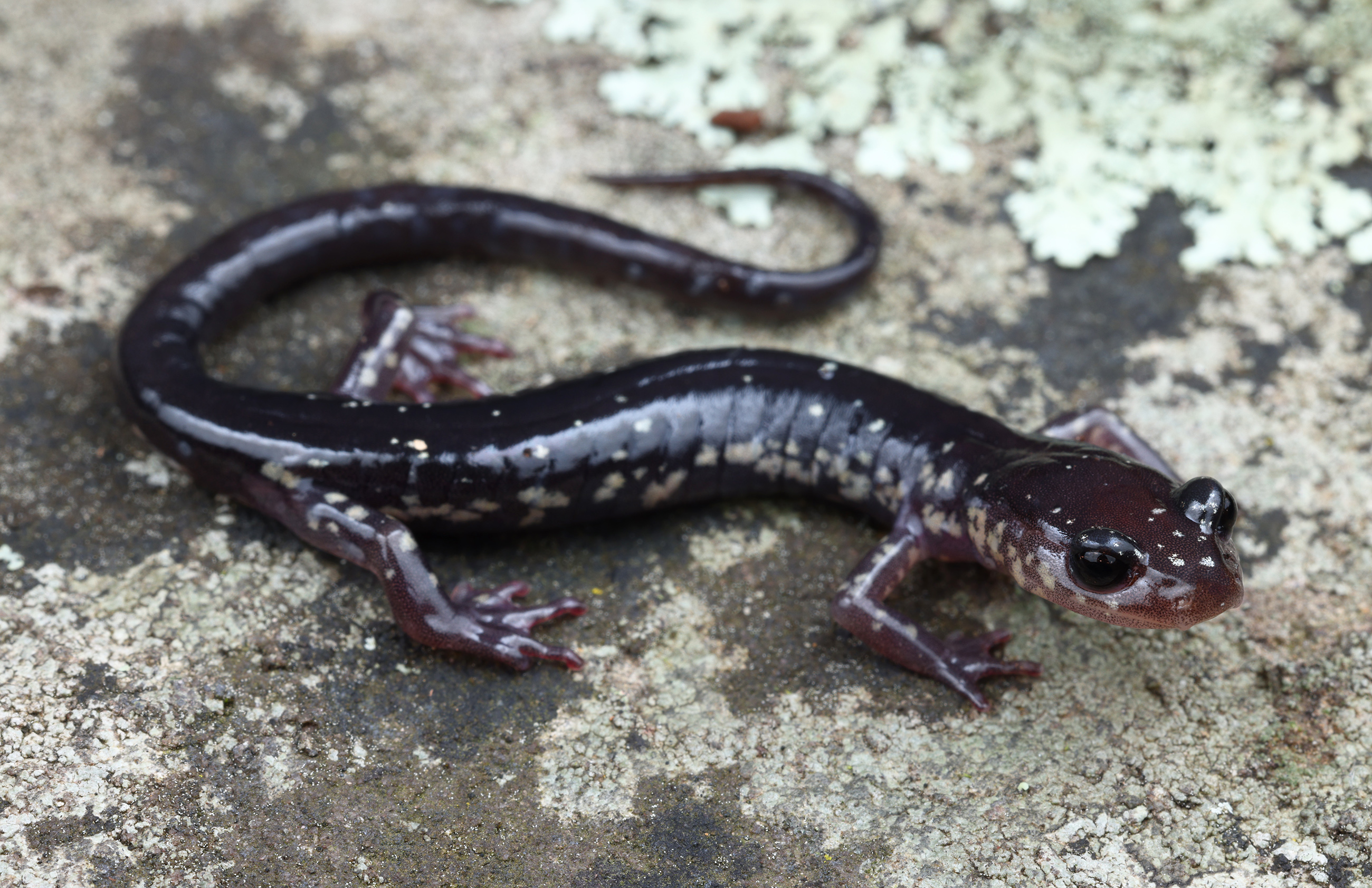

Conservation status
- Near Threatened (IUCN 3.1)

- Vulnerable (NatureServe)

Scientific classification
- Kingdom: Animalia
- Phylum: Chordata
- Class: Amphibia
- Order: Urodela
- Family: Plethodontidae
- Genus: Plethodon
- Species: P. punctatus

Binomial name
- Plethodon punctatus Highton, 1971 [1972]

= Cow Knob salamander =

Species of amphibian

Plethodon punctatus, commonly known as the Cow Knob salamander or white-spotted salamander (not to be confused with P. cylindraceus, the white-spotted slimy salamander), is a species of salamander in the family Plethodontidae. It is endemic to high mountain forests on the border of Virginia and West Virginia in the United States. Nearly all occurrences are on Shenandoah Mountain, Nathaniel Mountain and Great North Mountain in George Washington National Forest. Cow Knob salamanders are a member of the P. wehrlei species complex, which includes many other Appalachian salamanders historically referred to Plethodon wehrlei (Wehrle's salamander).

Major threats to Plethodon punctatus include habitat loss and climate change, and it is rated as Near Threatened by the IUCN. Although not protected by the Endangered Species Act, Cow Knob salamanders benefit from a 1994 conservation agreement between the U.S. Forest Service and the U.S. Fish and Wildlife Service. The species' threatened condition has helped to secure ecosystem conservation goals on Shenandoah Mountain and nearby ridges, such as redirecting the planned route of the Atlantic Coast Pipeline. Despite their restricted range, Cow Knob salamanders are abundant in localities with ideal environmental conditions, such as rocky old-growth hemlock forests.

== Taxonomy ==
Plethodon punctatus was named as a new species by Richard Highton in 1972. The holotype was recovered from the slope of Cow Knob, a peak on Shenandoah Mountain. Cow Knob lends its name to the common name of the species. With the use of genetic data, P. punctatus was immediately recognized as a genetically detached lineage descended from ancestral populations of the Wehrle's salamander (P. wehrlei).

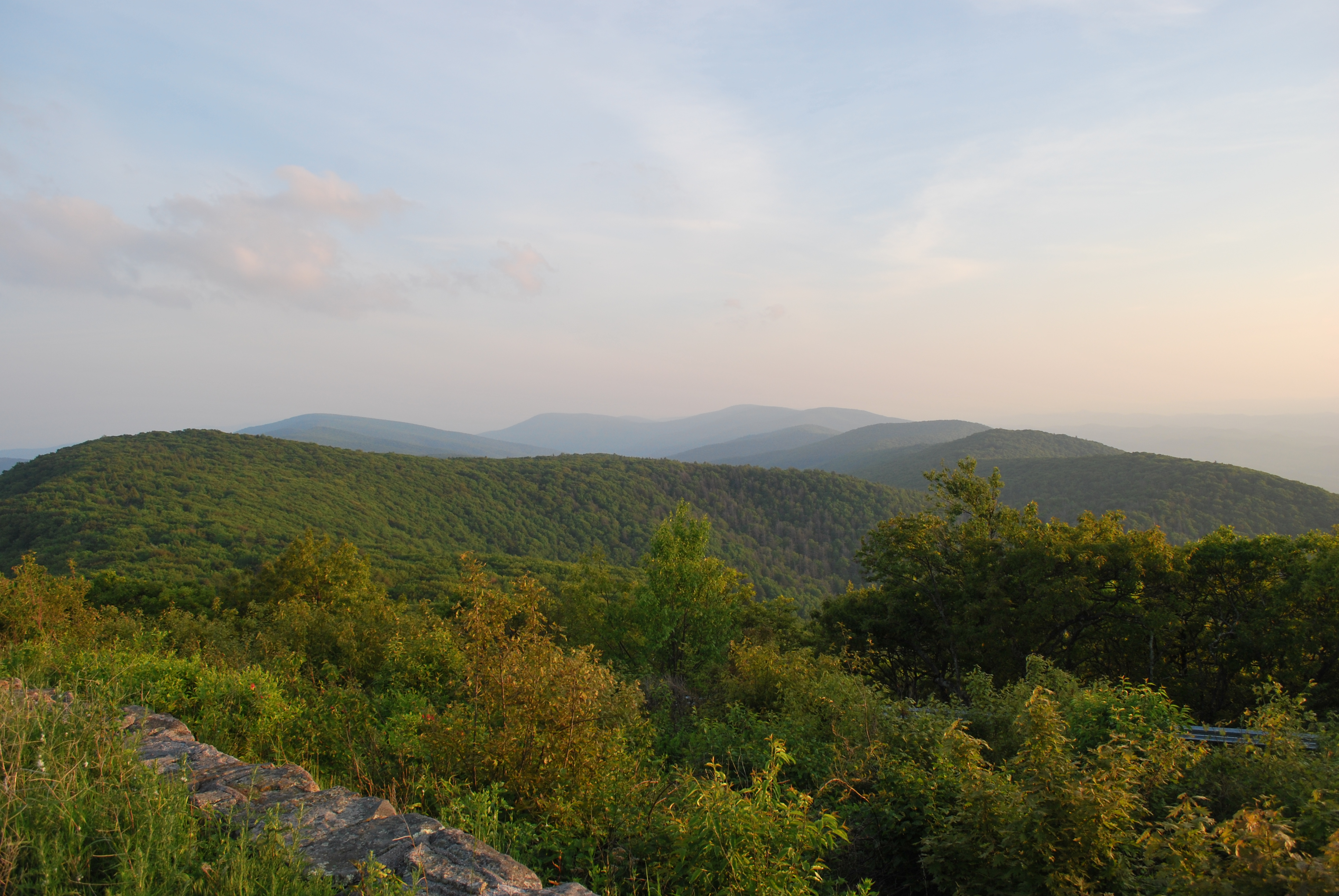
Landscape at Reddish Knob, a peak on Shenandoah Mountain which delineates the two populations of Cow Knob Salamander

Plethodon punctatus itself is divided into two populations, one occupying sites south of Reddish Knob, and the other north of Reddish Knob. The species as a whole diverged from P. wehrlei between the Late Pliocene (2.84 Ma) and mid-Pleistocene (1.04 Ma), while the two populations diverged from each other in the mid- to late-Pleistocene (1.30 to 0.40 Ma). The northern population has much lower genetic diversity compared to the southern population, despite inhabiting a larger area in the present day. It is probable that the ancestral (southern) population once occupied the entire range, only for the species's suitable climate to abruptly shift south with the arrival of glacial intervals in the Pleistocene. Most of the ancestral population dispersed south and continued to occupy a broad area south of their modern-day range. The few surviving relicts which refused to move would have experienced a population bottleneck and the founder effect, diverging into a new population. With warm conditions returning in the Holocene, the southern population repopulated part of their ancestral range while the northern population quickly expanded out of its isolated refuge. It is unclear whether the two populations have regained contact at Reddish Knob.

Long considered one of two valid species in the P. wehrlei group, P. punctatus has been a major player into the debate over species differentiation in that species complex. A 2012 genetic analysis confirmed that some West Virginian populations referred to P. wehrlei were actually more closely related to P. punctatus than to other populations from southern Virginia. This would render P. wehrlei a paraphyletic species, a problem which can be resolved either by lumping P. punctatus into P. wehrlei or by splitting the broader species into multiple smaller species. Some of these new species have already been named (P. dixi, P. jacksoni, P. pauleyi) while others are still tentatively referred to P. wehrlei. The "Northern wehrlei" clade (ranging from central West Virginia up to New York) is the closest to P. punctatus, both genetically and geographically, among all the clades historically lumped into P. wehrlei. P. pauleyi (of the Cumberland Plateau, previously the "yellow-spotted wehrlei" clade) is the next most closely related.

== Description ==
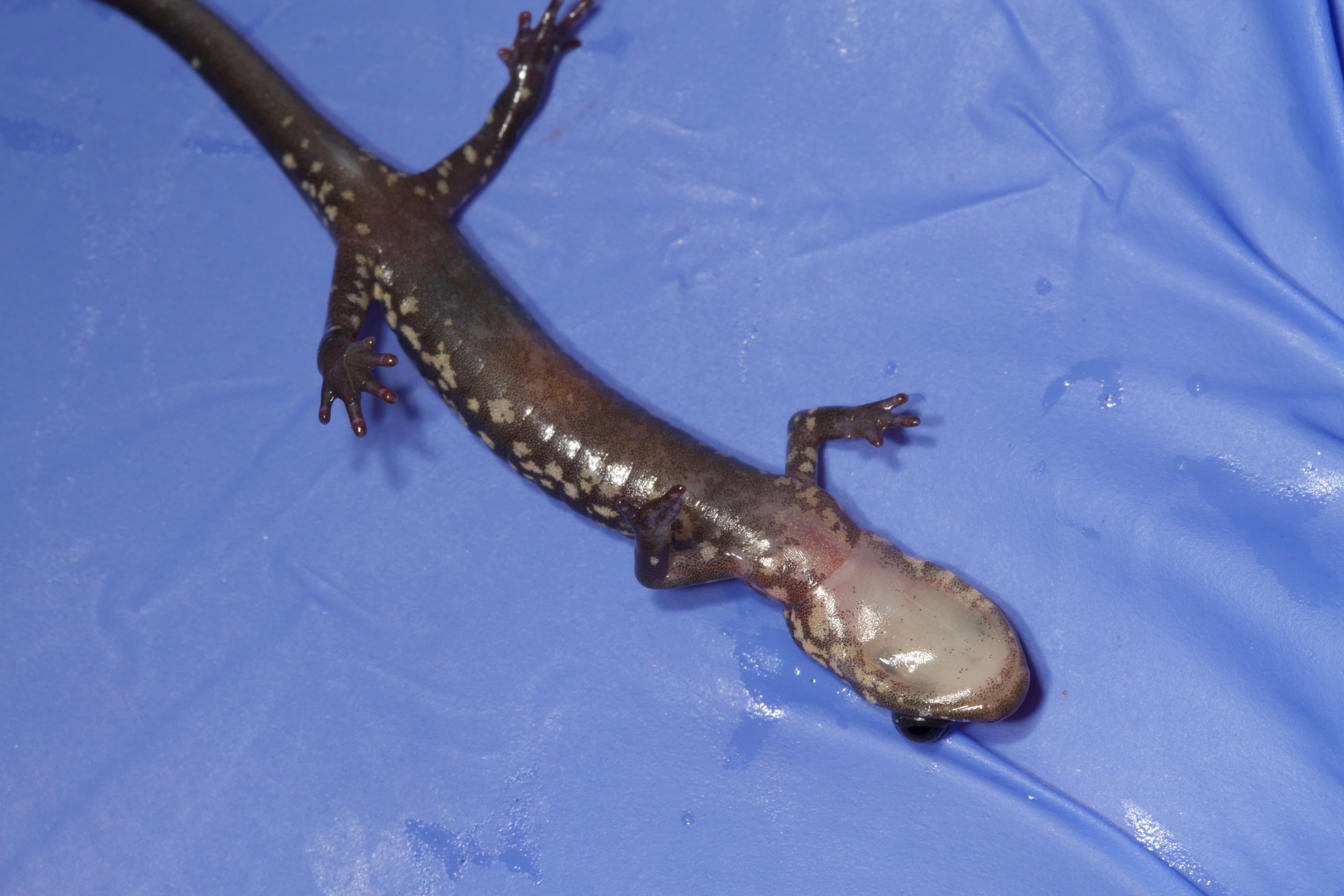
Plethodon punctatus as seen from below, showing the light throat coloration and grey belly

The Cow Knob salamander is a moderately large plethodontid. The largest recorded length is 17.1 cm (6.7 in), though most adults have a total length smaller than 15.7 cm (6.2 in). Around half of the total length is tail. The base coloration is dark brown or greyish-black. The sides and legs are colored with large white or cream spots, which may extend onto a portion of the belly. The back is typically speckled with smaller and more scattered spots. The species name 'punctatus' ("spotted") is in reference to these dorsal spots. The throat has a light pink or pale coloration which transitions to the grey belly.

The white-spotted slimy salamander (Plethodon cylindraceus) is similar in size and color, but differs in many other respects. Plethodon punctatus can differentiated by its more slender build, slightly webbed toes, protuberant eyes, a higher number of costal grooves (usually 17–18), and a lighter throat. It is very similar in appearance to closely related salamanders in the Plethodon wehrlei group, though it is slightly larger and completely lacks distinctive coloration patterns such as red spots, brassy flecks, or large yellow dorsal spots.

== Habitat ==
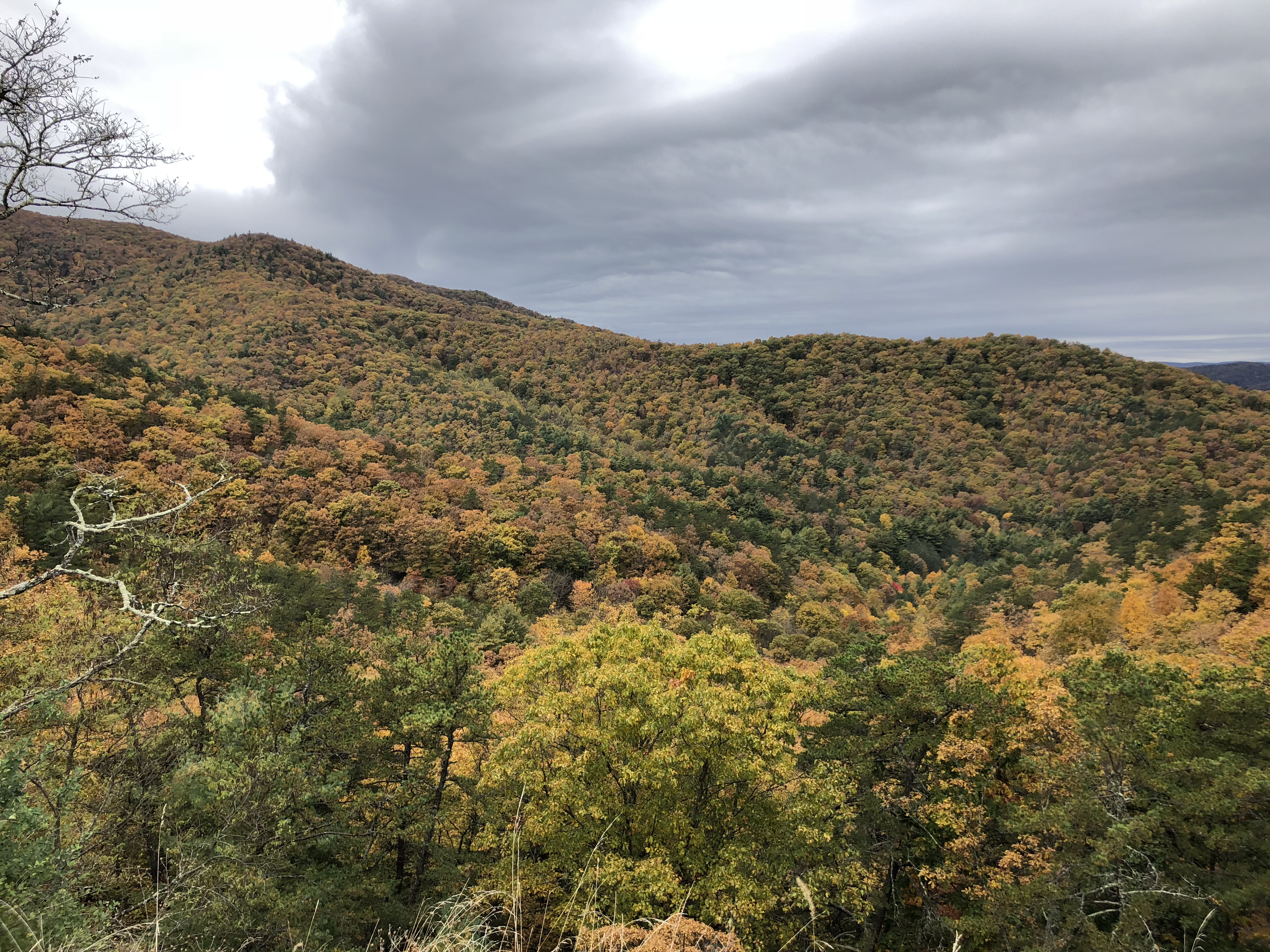
Fall colors in mixed forest on Shenandoah Mountain

Cow Knob salamanders are adapted to live in high-elevation hardwood forests with dense canopy cover and talus. Old-growth forests and hemlock stands are greatly preferred, while young pine monocultures and clearings are avoided. They typically occur at an elevation of 900–1,200 m (3,000–3,900 ft), with some reports as low as 735 m (2,411 ft). They are particularly abundant on north-facing slopes with an ample supply of rocks for cover. Rocks with large gaps underneath are the preferred form of refuge, followed by fallen logs.

== Ecology and behavior ==
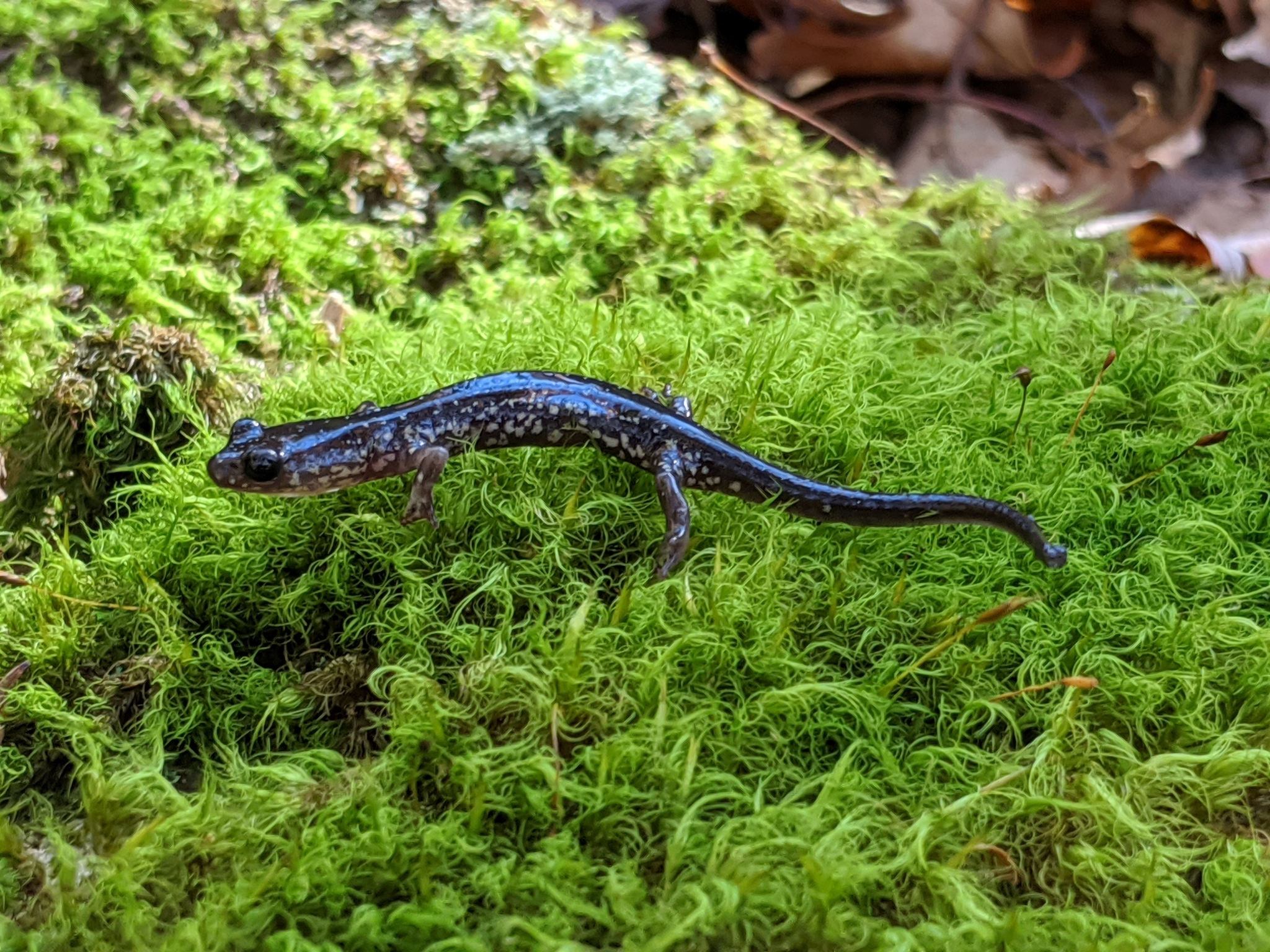
Seen in the wild in Pendleton County, West Virginia

The salamanders are most active in the spring (April–June) and fall (September–October), sheltering during the harsher months of the summer and winter. In West Virginia, their peak season extends into the early summer. They forage on cool wet nights, prioritizing the forest floor but also venturing onto trees or rocks. A wide range of small invertebrates are taken as prey. Plethodon punctatus is a host to Cepedietta michiganensis (a ciliate) and Batracholandros magnavulvaris (a nematode), both of which are fairly benign gut parasites common among Appalachian salamanders.

Cow Knob salamanders are direct developers, mating via spermatophore in the late winter or early spring. A clutch of 7-16 eggs can be laid every other year, though the precise timing is unknown. Juveniles hatch in the fall and reach sexual maturity within 3 or 4 years, with females maturing later and at a larger body size. This species is not migratory on an individual basis, and most adults have a range of only a few meters throughout their lifetime.

Plethodon punctatus coexists alongside the ecologically similar Shenandoah Mountain salamander (Plethodon virginia, previously referred to Plethodon hoffmani). The two species do not show any competitive exclusion, despite P. punctatus juveniles overlapping the size range of P. virginia adults. To reduce competition, the two species may be active at different times upon the arrival of ideal environmental conditions. P. punctatus tend to find refuge in shallow rockier soils, which may be more sensitive to surface temperature and humidity levels compared to the deep moist soils preferred by P. virginia.

== Conservation ==
=== Threats ===
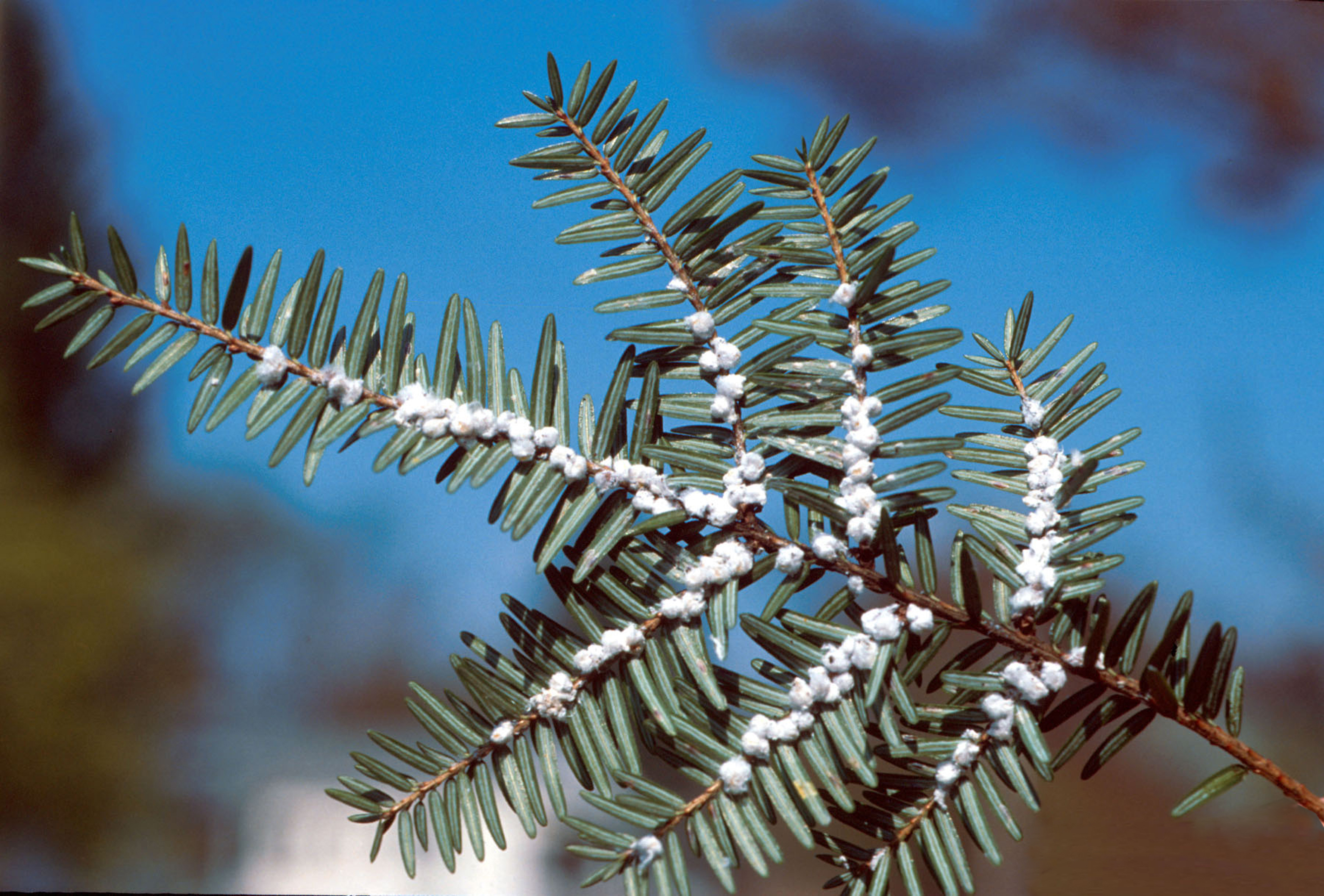
Cow Knob salamanders are threatened by the loss of hemlock forest and other suitable habitats via logging or invasive pests (such as woolly adelgid, pictured)

Plethodon punctatus occurs entirely within the protected area of George Washington National Forest, though some pressures still threaten the species. As the salamander is reliant on stable mountain forest ecosystems, the largest threat is logging within the forest, especially during peak salamander activity periods. To prevent population decline, logging should be restricted to discontinuous patches, road building should be minimized or eliminated, and replanting should emphasize trees other than white pine. Another concern is defoliation from invasive insects such as woolly adelgid (Adelges tsugae) and spongy moth (Lymantria dispar).

Plethodon punctatus has a particularly low heat tolerance among Appalachian salamanders. As a montane species with limited routes of dispersal, it is particularly vulnerable to the effects of climate change. At intermediate rates of warming (RCP 4.5), 93–100% of suitable habitat is expected to be lost by 2050. Some shaded slopes may retain a suitable microclimate, but these refugia would be isolated from each other, leading to an unsustainable decrease in genetic diversity. In addition, climate change may bring Plethodon punctatus into greater competition with Plethodon cylindraceus, an aggressive species which is more dominant in warm areas at lower elevation.

=== Assessments and protections ===
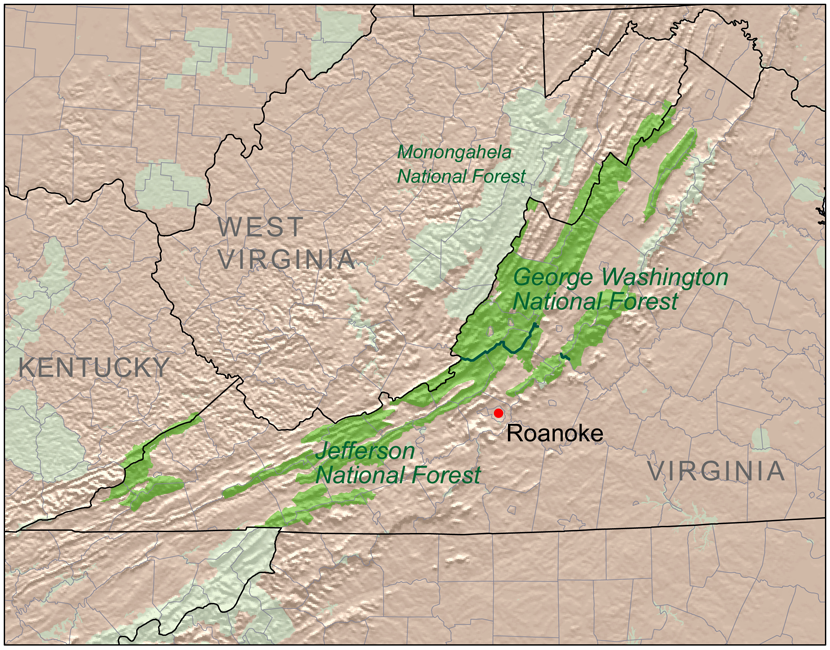
Map of national forest land in Virginia

The IUCN Red List has listed Plethodon punctatus as a Near Threatened species since 2004. NatureServe lists the species as vulnerable (G3) at a national level, and imperiled (S2) in both states considered separately. The Virginia Department of Wildlife Resources classifies Plethodon punctatus as a tier Ic Species of Greatest Conservation Need. This indicates extreme risk of extirpation alongside limited potential for state conservation actions or research (due to most of its range being federally managed). A 2012 petition to grant federal protection to the species under the Endangered Species Act was rejected by the United States Fish and Wildlife Service (USFWS) in 2016.

George Washington National Forest is managed by the United States Forest Service (USFS), providing a base level of federal protection from private enterprises. The Cow Knob salamander is an example of a Management Indicator Species (MIS), a type of animal used to evaluate and implement broader ecosystem conservation policies. In 1994, the USFS and USFWS entered into a conservation agreement to maintain the species' viability and prevent the need to list it as an endangered species. Approximately 58,000 acres of salamander habitat at the crest of Shenandoah Mountain are protected from timber harvesting and road construction under this agreement. Much of the protected land also overlaps with wilderness area protections and the proposed Shenandoah Mountain National Scenic Area.

The Atlantic Coast Pipeline, a planned natural gas pipeline primarily funded by Dominion Energy, was initially designed to pass over Shenandoah Mountain along its route. By late October 2015, USFS concerns over the preservation of salamander habitat led the developers to propose horizontal directional drilling under the mountain. In January 2016, the pipeline was forced to find a new route entirely, as even the revised construction plan would have adversely impacted wildlife. The Cow Knob salamander was the main species considered in the decision, alongside Cheat Mountain salamanders (Plethodon nettingi) and West Virginia northern flying squirrels (Glacuomys sabrinus fuscus).
