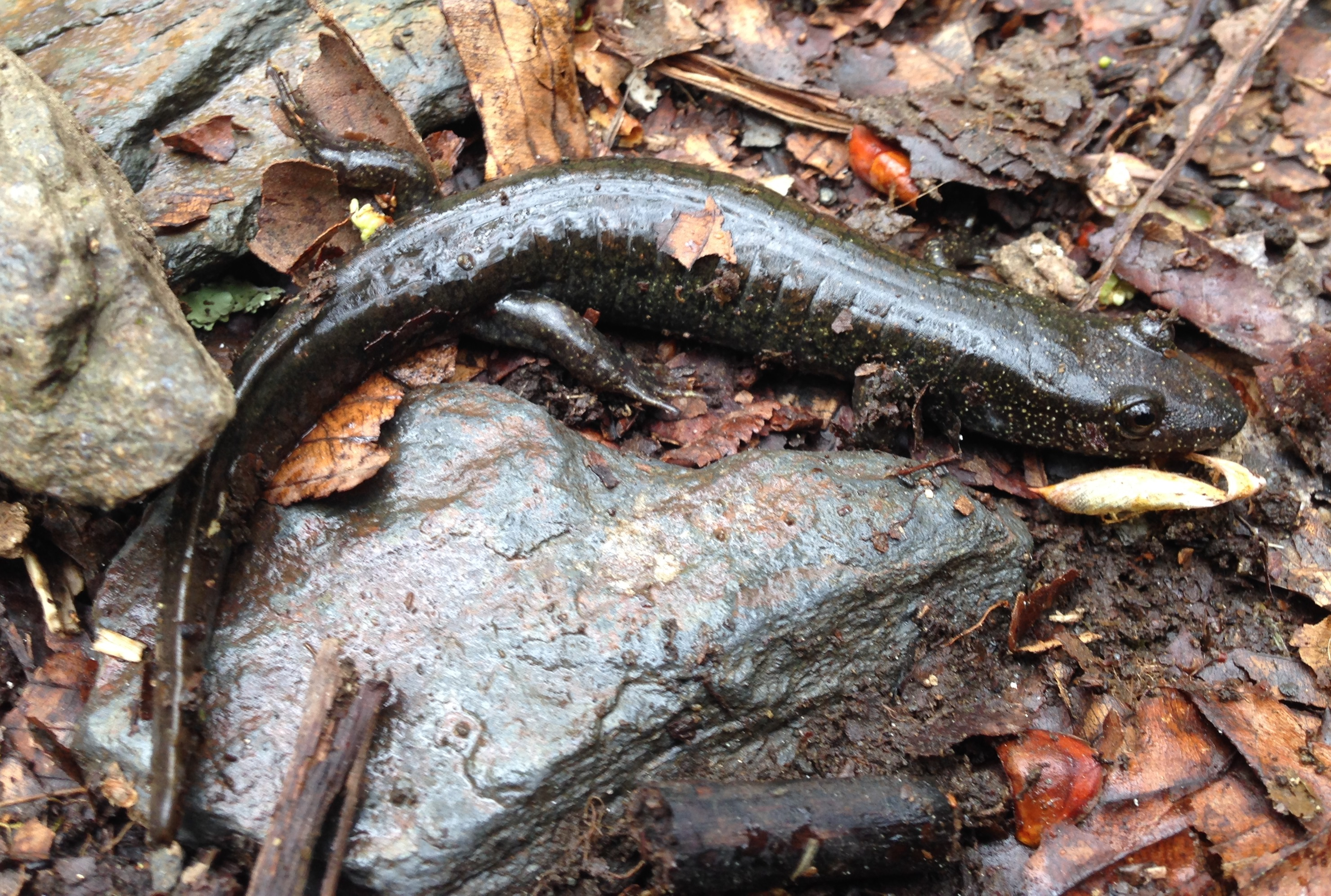
- In Great Smoky Mountains National Park

Conservation status
- Vulnerable (NatureServe)

Scientific classification
- Kingdom: Animalia
- Phylum: Chordata
- Class: Amphibia
- Order: Urodela
- Family: Plethodontidae
- Genus: Desmognathus
- Species: D. gvnigeusgwotli

Binomial name
- Desmognathus gvnigeusgwotli Pyron and Beamer, 2022

= Cherokee black-bellied salamander =

Species of amphibian

The Cherokee black-bellied salamander or Smoky Mountains black-bellied salamander (Desmognathus gvnigeusgwotli) is a species of lungless salamander in the family Plethodontidae. It is endemic to the eastern United States, where it is only known from the southern Appalachian Mountains.

It is known from extreme western North Carolina and southeastern Tennessee. It is restricted mostly to the Great Smoky Mountains, with isolated records also known from the Unicoi, Great Balsam, and Bald Mountains. This is the more common of the two species of "blackbelly salamander" known from Great Smoky Mountains National Park. This species and the other blackbelly salamander from the range (the Pisgah black-bellied salamander, D. mavrokoilus) are the first new vertebrate taxa to be discovered in the park's all-taxa biodiversity inventory.

Initially grouped with the blackbelly salamander (D. quadramaculatus), a 2022 study found significant genetic divergence within the species, but also found that the name D. quadramaculatus had in fact been coined for the northern dusky salamander rather than the blackbelly salamander. The Smoky Mountains population was thus described as a new species, D. gvnigeusgwotli. The specific epithet, gvnigeusgwotli, roughly translates to "black belly" in the Cherokee language.
