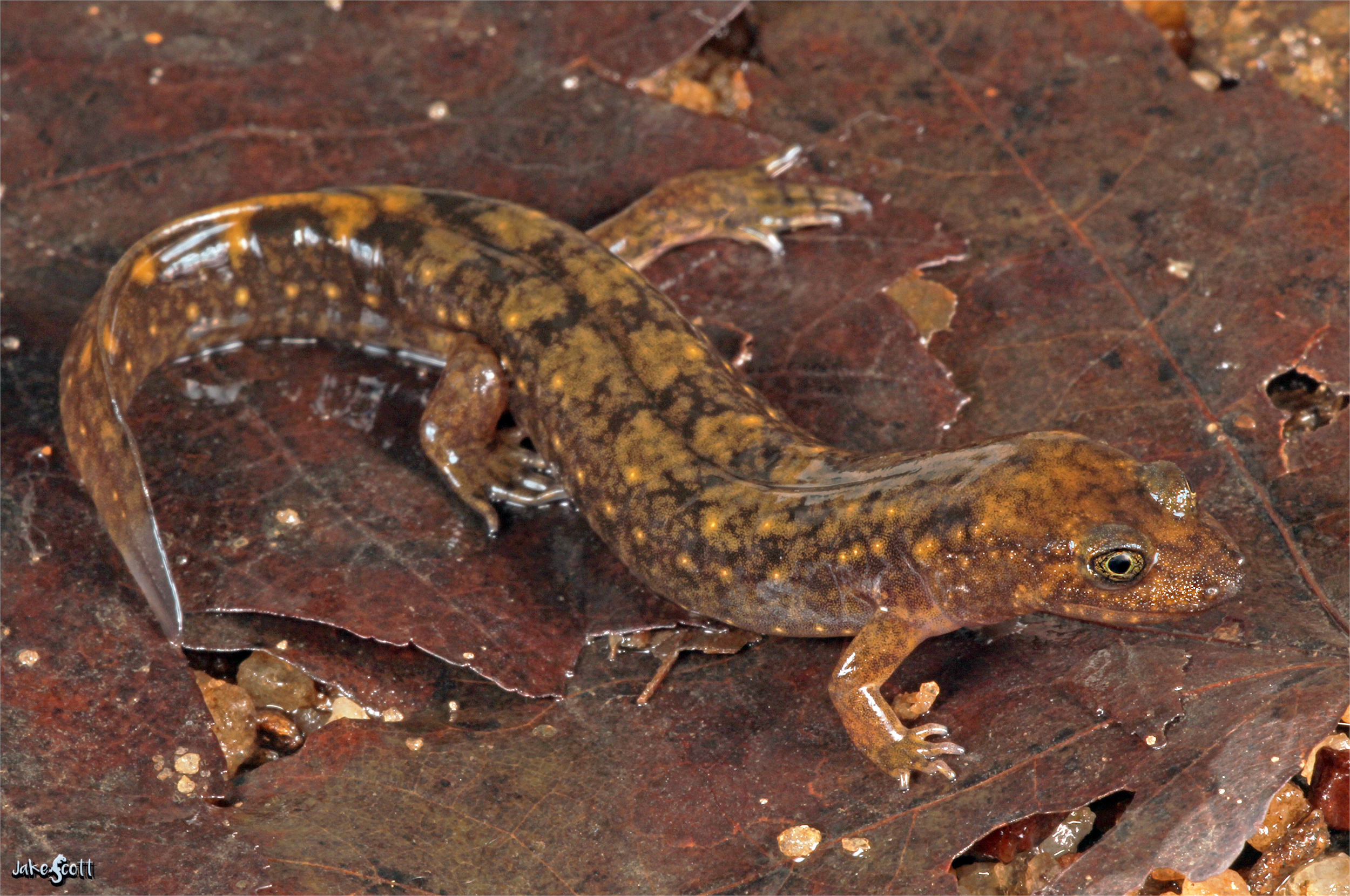

Conservation status
- Data Deficient (IUCN 3.1)

Scientific classification
- Kingdom: Animalia
- Phylum: Chordata
- Class: Amphibia
- Order: Urodela
- Family: Plethodontidae
- Genus: Desmognathus
- Species: D. aureatus

Binomial name
- Desmognathus aureatus (Martof, 1956)

= Golden shovel-nosed salamander =

Species of salamander

The golden shovel-nosed salamander (Desmognathus aureatus) is a species of salamander in the family Plethodontidae. It is endemic to the United States.

It was described in 1956 but was later reclassified as synonymous with the shovelnose salamander (D. marmoratus). However, a 2009 mtDNA study found sufficient genetic divergence to again classify as its own species. It is not recognized by other taxonomic authorities due to it being distinguished by mtDNA studies and problems with mtDNA introgression in the genus Desmognathus, but it is still recognized by Darrel Frost pending publication of counter-evidence.

It is found in the Chattahoochee, Tallulah, and Chattooga river basins of Georgia and adjacent parts of South Carolina.
