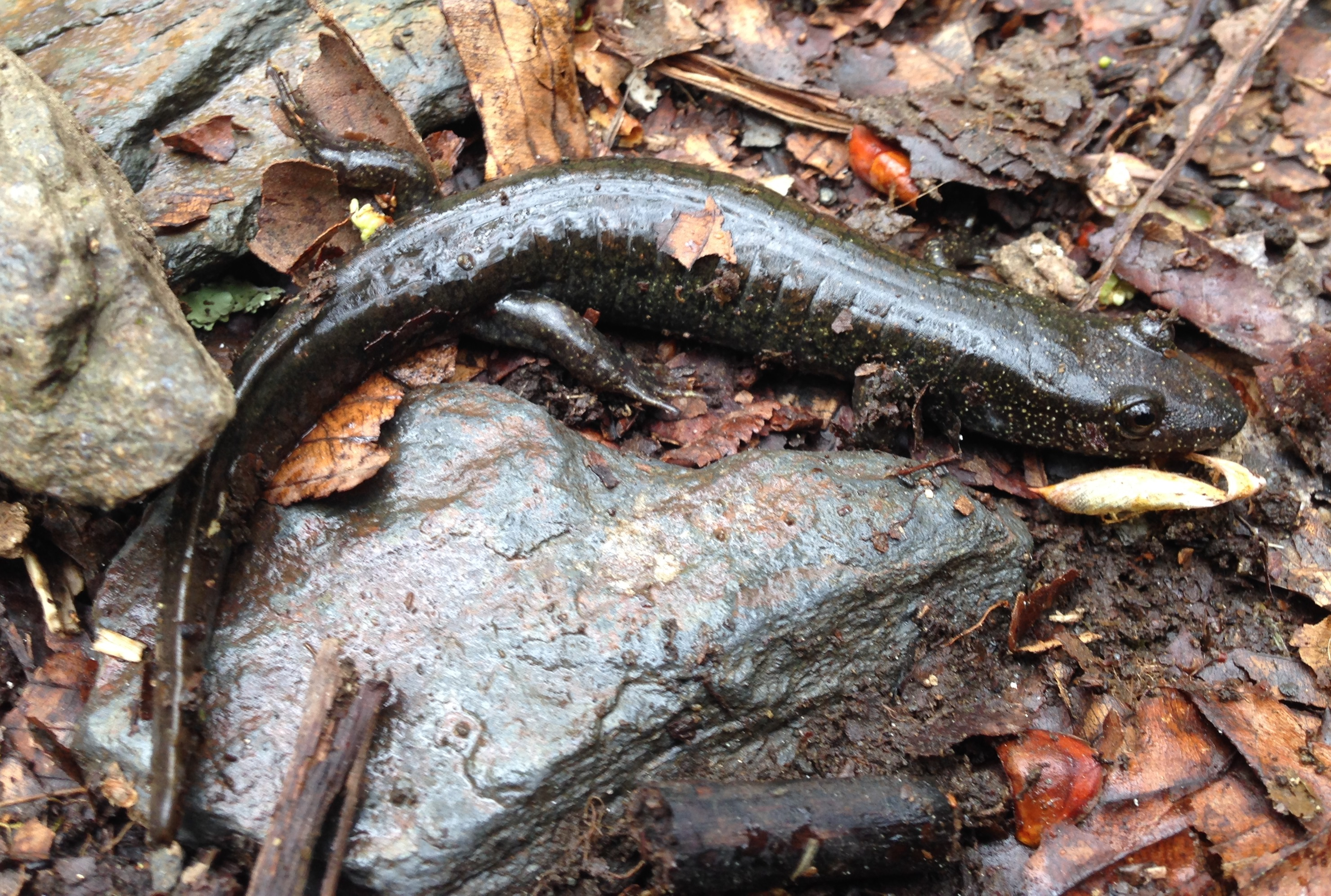

Conservation status
- Least Concern (IUCN 3.1)

Scientific classification
- Kingdom: Animalia
- Phylum: Chordata
- Class: Amphibia
- Order: Urodela
- Family: Plethodontidae
- Genus: Desmognathus
- Species: D. quadramaculatus

Binomial name
- Desmognathus quadramaculatus (Holbrook, 1840)

Synonyms
- Salamandra quadra-maculata Holbrook, 1840

= Blackbelly salamander =

Species of amphibian

The blackbelly salamander (Desmognathus quadramaculatus) is a species of salamander in the family Plethodontidae. It is endemic to the United States. The genus Desmognathus (dusky salamanders) contains 20 different species, making up the second largest genus of plethodontid salamanders in the eastern United States. Its natural habitats are rivers, intermittent rivers, and freshwater springs. It is threatened by habitat loss. A 2022 study found that Desmognathus quadramaculatus was actually a synonym of the Northern Dusky Salamander, and it is no longer considered a valid name for the Blackbelly Salamanders. Instead, the group has been split into multiple species, including Desmognathus amphileucus, Desmognathus folkertsi, Desmognathus gvnigeusgwotli, Desmognathus kanawha, and Desmognathus mavrokoilius.

== Description ==
The blackbelly salamander is a medium-sized salamander growing to about 10 to 18 centimetres (3.9 to 7.1 in) long. It is the largest species in the genus Desmognathus. It is sturdily built with a long tail. The ground colour is dark brown or black with two rows of small pale spots along each side of the back. The underside is usually black but may have pale flecks in young individuals.

They are highly variable in color, with the ground color ranging from a light gray to deep black. Their color has been recorded in one study to be related to their habitat. Populations that are only a few meters away can have drastic differences phenotypically, depending on the habitat differences. This study showed that two populations in the same stream were vastly different in color. This could be related to the amount in shade, leaf litter, and rock color of their habitat.

== Distribution and habitat ==
The blackbelly salamander is found in the Appalachian Mountains in southeastern United States. Its range extends from West Virginia, through southeastern Virginia, eastern Tennessee, western North and South Carolina, and northern Georgia. It is a largely aquatic species and lives in cold mountain streams at heights of 375 to 1,725 metres (1,230 to 5,659 ft) above sea level.

== Behaviour ==
The blackbelly salamander spends more time in water than all other members of the genus except the shovelnose salamander (Desmognathus marmoratus). It mainly forages on land and has a home range of at least 1,200 square centimetres (190 square inches) but seldom travels more than 30 centimetres (12 in) from the stream. In this home range it has one or more refugia, crevices in the rock or burrow entrances in which it can conceal itself, ambushing small invertebrates as they pass by. Their diet shifts throughout the different stages of their life. During their larval stage they prey mostly on insect nymphs, when juveniles they will eat a mixture of aquatic and aerial prey, and when they are adults they eat aquatic, aerial, and terrestrial prey including other salamanders. It defends these refugia against other members of its own species. Salamanders will violently defend this refugia even resorting to cannibalism

Breeding takes place in the late spring. The female attaches fifteen to forty eggs to the base of submerged boulders. The eggs hatch in about three months and the larvae develop slowly, undergoing metamorphosis into juvenile salamanders about three and a half years later. Research has shown that these larval salamanders can detect differences in each fish to know which is a predator.

== Ecology ==
Several other species of salamander occupy the same range as the blackbelly salamander. These include the dusky salamander (Desmognathus fuscus), the Allegheny Mountain dusky salamander (Desmognathus ochrophaeus), and the seal salamander (Desmognathus monticola). Blackbelly salamanders have been shown to push Dusky salamanders out of the coveted stream splash zones, and have also been observed preying on the Duskys.

Blackbelly and seal salamanders seem to actively avoid each other and it is possible that they use chemical cues to avoid coming into contact. They are sometimes attacked by garter snakes (Thamnophis sp.). The blackbelly salamander's defence strategies include its warning colouration (though it is not in fact toxic), remaining still in the hope a predator will fail to notice it, biting the aggressor, and shedding its tail (autotomy) as a distraction. Biting was successful against garter snakes and was also used against shrews.

== Status ==
The IUCN Red List of Threatened Species lists the blackbelly salamander as being of "Least Concern". The reasons given are that the population seems stable with an estimated number of at least 10,000 individuals. It might decline in some localities if streams become acidic as a result of mining activities, and in some places, fishermen capture it for use as bait.
