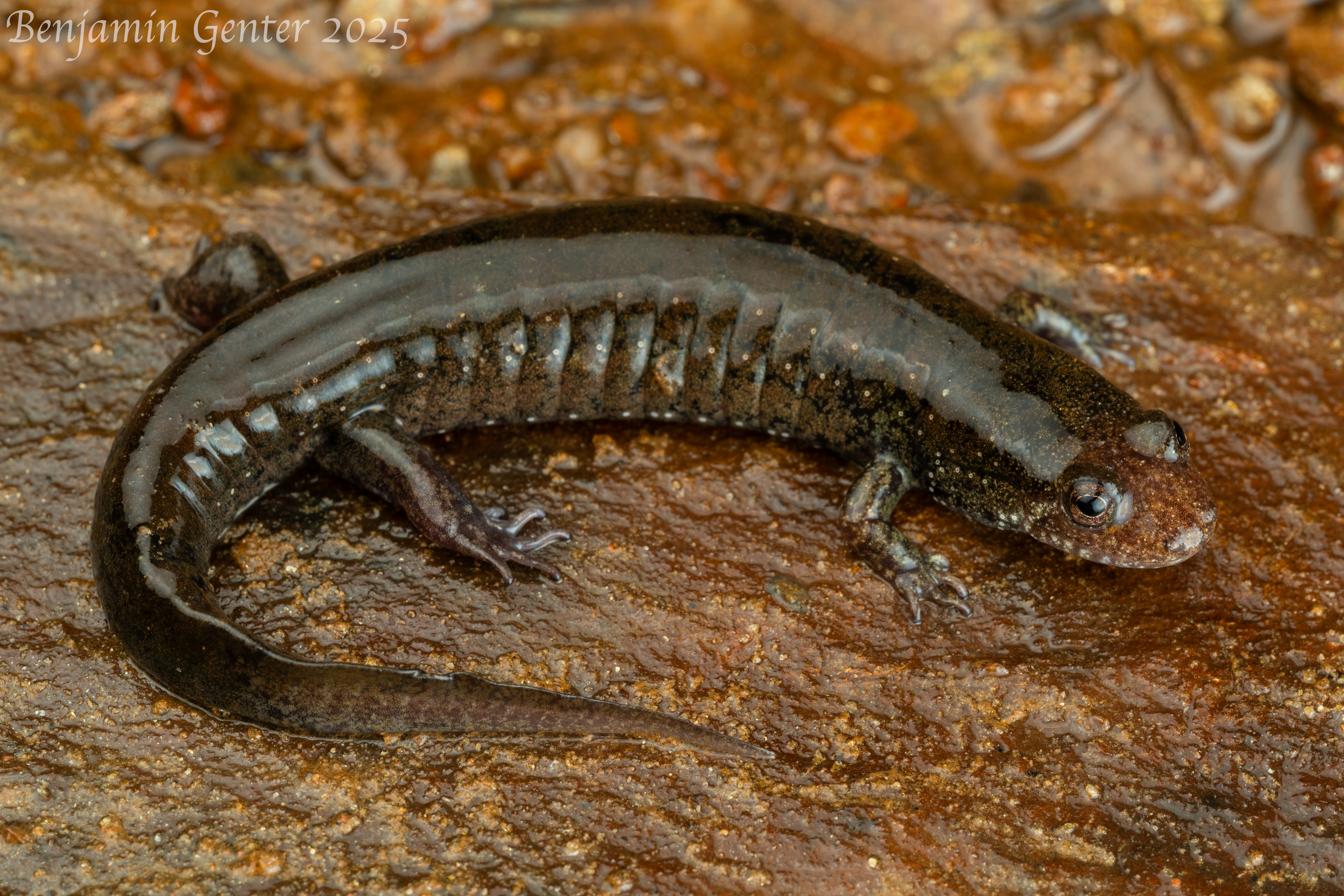

Conservation status
- Least Concern (IUCN 3.1)

Scientific classification
- Kingdom: Animalia
- Phylum: Chordata
- Class: Amphibia
- Order: Urodela
- Family: Plethodontidae
- Genus: Desmognathus
- Species: D. folkertsi

Binomial name
- Desmognathus folkertsi Camp, Tilley, Austin & Marshall, 2002

= Dwarf black-bellied salamander =

Species of amphibian

The dwarf black-bellied salamander (Desmognathus folkertsi) is a species of salamander in the family Plethodontidae. It is endemic to the United States, specifically found in the southern tip of the Blue Ridge Mountains range, near the borders of Georgia, North Carolina, and South Carolina.

Its natural habitats are temperate forests and rivers.

The dwarf black-bellied salamander (Desmognathus folkertsi) was originally thought to be the blackbelly salamander (Desmognathus quadramaculatus) as they appear similar and are sympatric in the areas that the dwarf black-bellied salamander is found. They can be distinguished through genetically different loci or morphologically in that D. folkertsi are smaller, have different coloration and patterns, and different proportions in body.
