= Reddish Knob =

Mountain in Virginia and West Virginia, United States

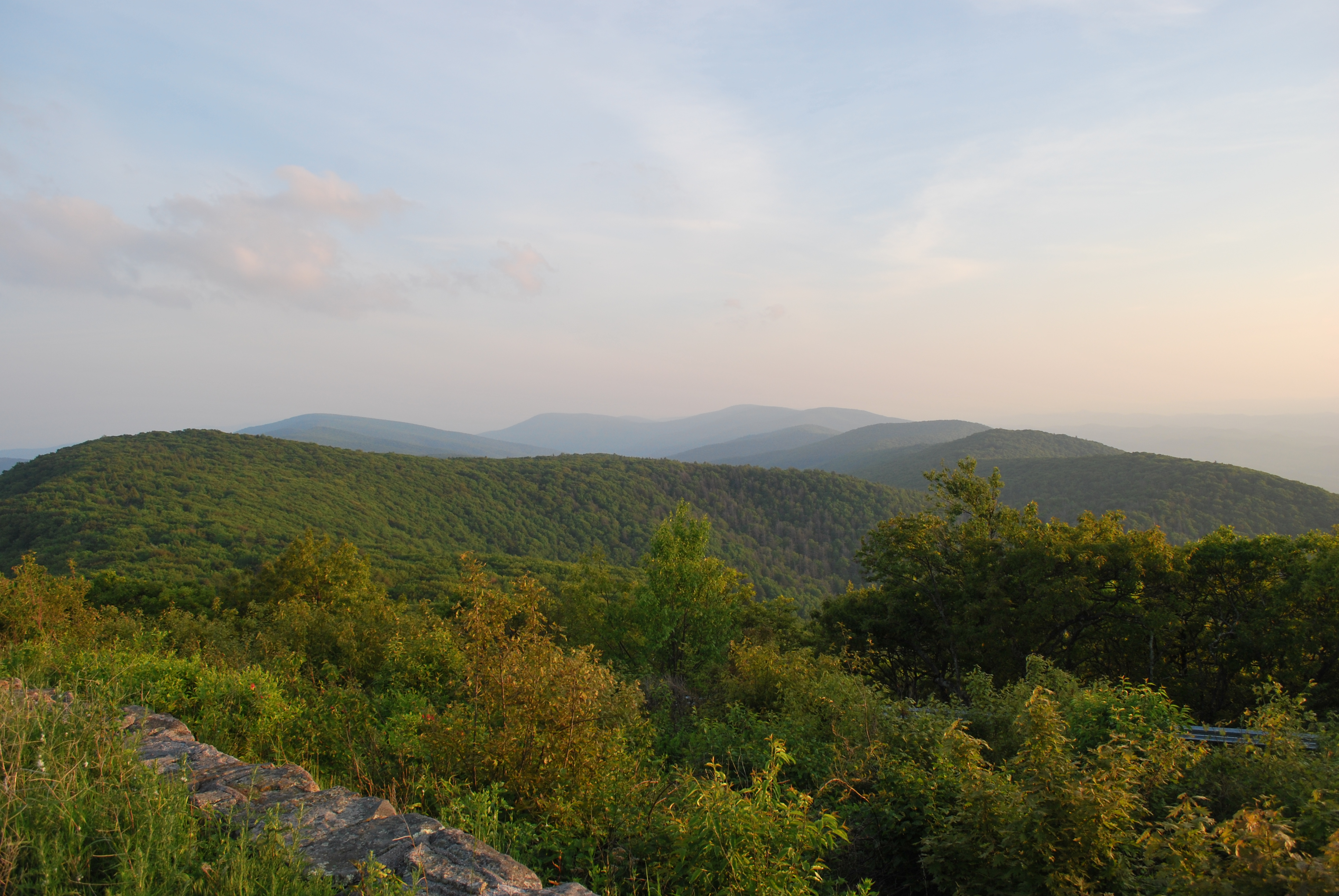
- Looking south along Shenandoah Mountain

Highest point
- Elevation: 4,397 ft (1,340 m)
- Prominence: 2,017 ft (615 m)
- Coordinates: 38°27′44″N 79°14′30″W

Geography
- Location within Virginia
- Location: Augusta VA, Pendleton WV
- Parent range: Allegheny Mountains

Climbing
- Access: drive-up via FR 85

Reddish Knob of Shenandoah Mountain is one of the highest points in Virginia, rising 4,397 feet (1,340 m). A narrow, paved road reaches the summit from Harrisonburg, Virginia.

== Geography ==
Reddish Knob is located on the border between Augusta County, Virginia and Pendleton County, West Virginia, in the George Washington National Forest.

Reddish Knob stands within the watershed of the Potomac River, which drains into Chesapeake Bay. The northwest side of Reddish Knob drains into Stony Run, thence into the South Fork of the South Branch of the Potomac River. To the south, Reddish Knob drains into the North Fork of the Little River, thence into the North River, the South Fork of the Shenandoah River, and into the Potomac River. To the east, Reddish Knob drains into the Briery Branch of the North River.

From Reddish Knob, a scenic gravel road continues south along the ridge crest that forms the boundary between Virginia and West Virginia, passing Shenandoah Mountain Picnic Area in a couple of miles. Further south lies the Ramsey's Draft Wilderness, which contains several stands of virgin hemlock.

To the north, a rough road provides access to a number of ridge top balds that have great primitive campsites. Several developed recreation sites are nearby. Hone Quarry has a picnic area, campground with widely spaced sites, and a small lake.

== Recreation ==
The mountain peak is a popular destination for "day-trippers" for students of the nearby James Madison University, Eastern Mennonite University, and Bridgewater College. They enjoy the "parking lot in the sky" as a place to relax and enjoy spectacular 360 degree views year round.

Grindstone 100 Miler run entrants summit Reddish Knob.

Every year the Blue Ridge Running Camp runs up Reddish Knob.

The summit is also included in the Jeremiah Bishop Alpine Loop Gran Fondo. The loop climbs to Reddish Knob via the "darkside" of Reddish Knob's forest road, routes to the summit, then descends to Harrisonburg via the paved access road.

== Fire tower ==
From the 1920s to 1975, a steel fire tower stood atop Reddish Knob.
