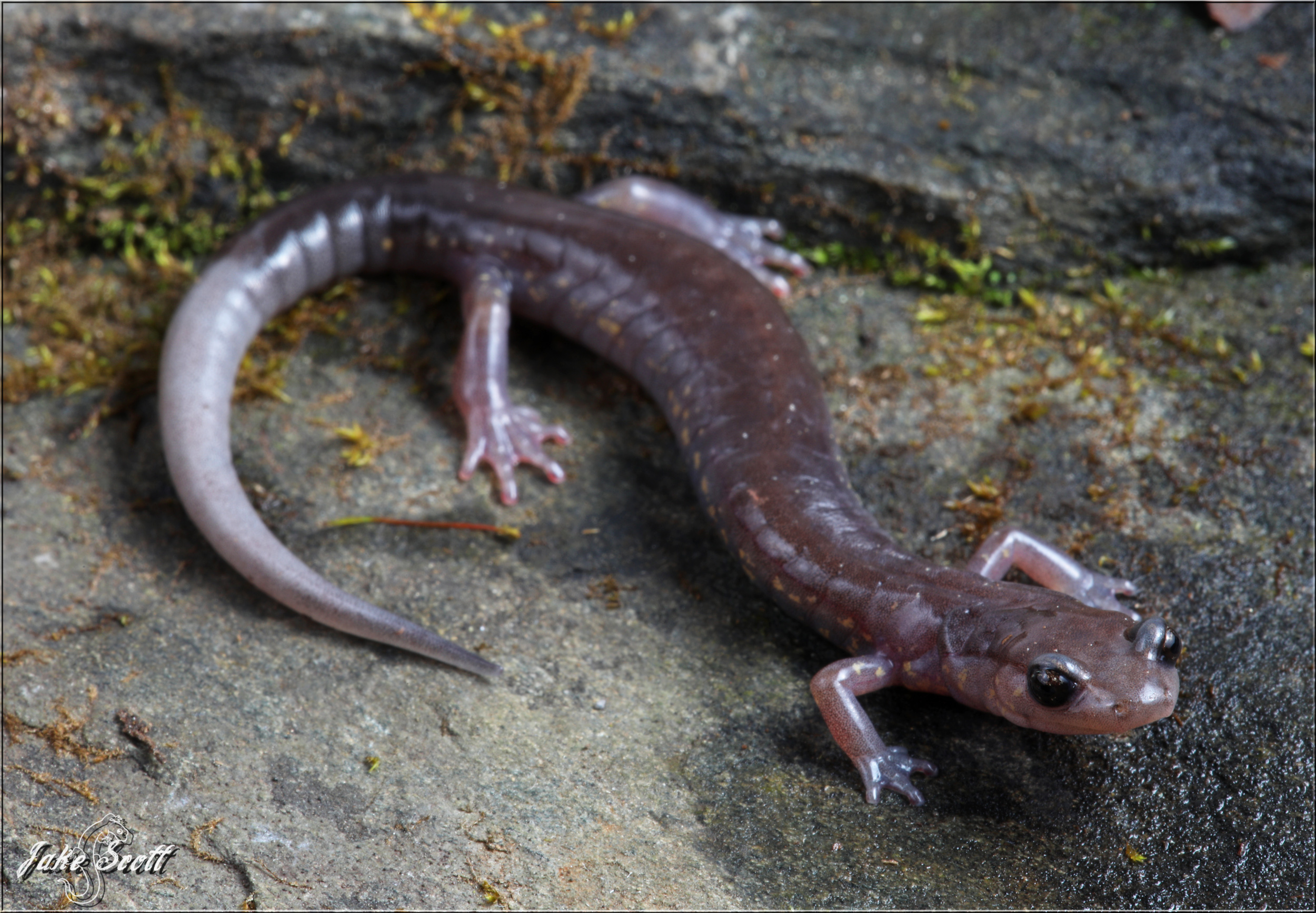

Conservation status
- Data Deficient (IUCN 3.1)

Scientific classification
- Kingdom: Animalia
- Phylum: Chordata
- Class: Amphibia
- Order: Urodela
- Family: Plethodontidae
- Genus: Plethodon
- Species: P. jacksoni

Binomial name
- Plethodon jacksoni Newman, 1954

Synonyms
- Plethodon wehrlei jacksoni Cochran, 1961; Plethodon wehrlei (in part) Highton, 1962

= Blacksburg salamander =

Species of amphibian

The Blacksburg salamander (Plethodon jacksoni) is a species of salamander in the family Plethodontidae. It is endemic to the Southeastern United States, where it is restricted to a portion of the Appalachian Mountains in southwestern Virginia (and possibly neighboring portions of North Carolina). Its common name refers the town of Blacksburg, Virginia, as many specimens were initially found in the vicinity of the town.

== Description ==
Plethodon jacksoni is very similar in appearance to the Wehrle's salamander (P. wehrlei) in both proportions and color. It is slender in build, with a rounded head, large eyes, and a short snout. Males can reach up to 13.5 cm (5.3 in) in total length (11.6 cm (4.6 in) on average), with females up to 13.3 cm (5.2 in), 12.5 cm (4.9 in) on average. Broadly speaking, P. jacksoni are larger than P. dixi and smaller than P. wehrlei. Mature males have a prominent mental gland on the chin and swellings above the base of the tail, while females have proportionally longer bodies.

The background color is dark bluish gray, with the back as the darkest part of the body. The throat and belly are lighter, though there is little consistency between specimens regarding the distribution of light coloration on the underside. Distinctive white blotches typically occur on the sides and limbs and sometimes encroach onto the belly. Silvery mottling and tiny white flecks may be present on the back and tail. Some individuals, including the holotype, have sparse but distinctive reddish-orange spots on the back.

== Taxonomy ==
Plethodon jacksoni was formally described in 1954 based on several specimens collected from Montgomery County, Virginia. The species was named in honor of Herbert Jackson, a biologist at Virginia Tech. Shortly after its initial description, it was considered to be a southern population of Plethodon wehrlei and was lumped into that species for many years. A 2019 study once again recovered Plethodon jacksoni as a valid species according to the distinctiveness of its mitochondrial cytochrome b gene. In conjunction, this analysis found P. wehrlei to be a paraphyletic taxon. This conclusion supports earlier genomic studies published in 2012 and 2018. Plethodon jacksoni diverged from its closest relatives around 4.6 million years ago according to a 2018 estimate.

Not all taxonomic issues within P. jacksoni were solved during the 2019 study: several other salamander populations were found to lie close to the Montgomery County specimens of P. jacksoni, indicating that its geographic range and genetic diversity may be higher than previously considered. These additional potential populations of Plethodon jacksoni include the "southern wehrlei" clade (which extends as far south as North Carolina) and "population 29" (from Roanoke County, Virginia). It remains to be seen whether this broader notion of the species is natural or paraphyletic.

== Habitat and distribution ==
The natural habitat of Plethodon jacksoni is temperate forest. It can be found sheltering under rocks and logs on dry hillsides during the late winter and early spring. Some members of the species live in caves, even during parts of the year where they are not observed on the surface. Plethodon jacksoni is most frequently observed in Montgomery County, Virginia, though it has also been reported from Giles, Craig, and possibly Pittsylvania counties. The "southern wehrlei" salamander population, which may be closely related or within P. jacksoni, occurs as far south as northwestern North Carolina (Stokes and Alleghany counties).
