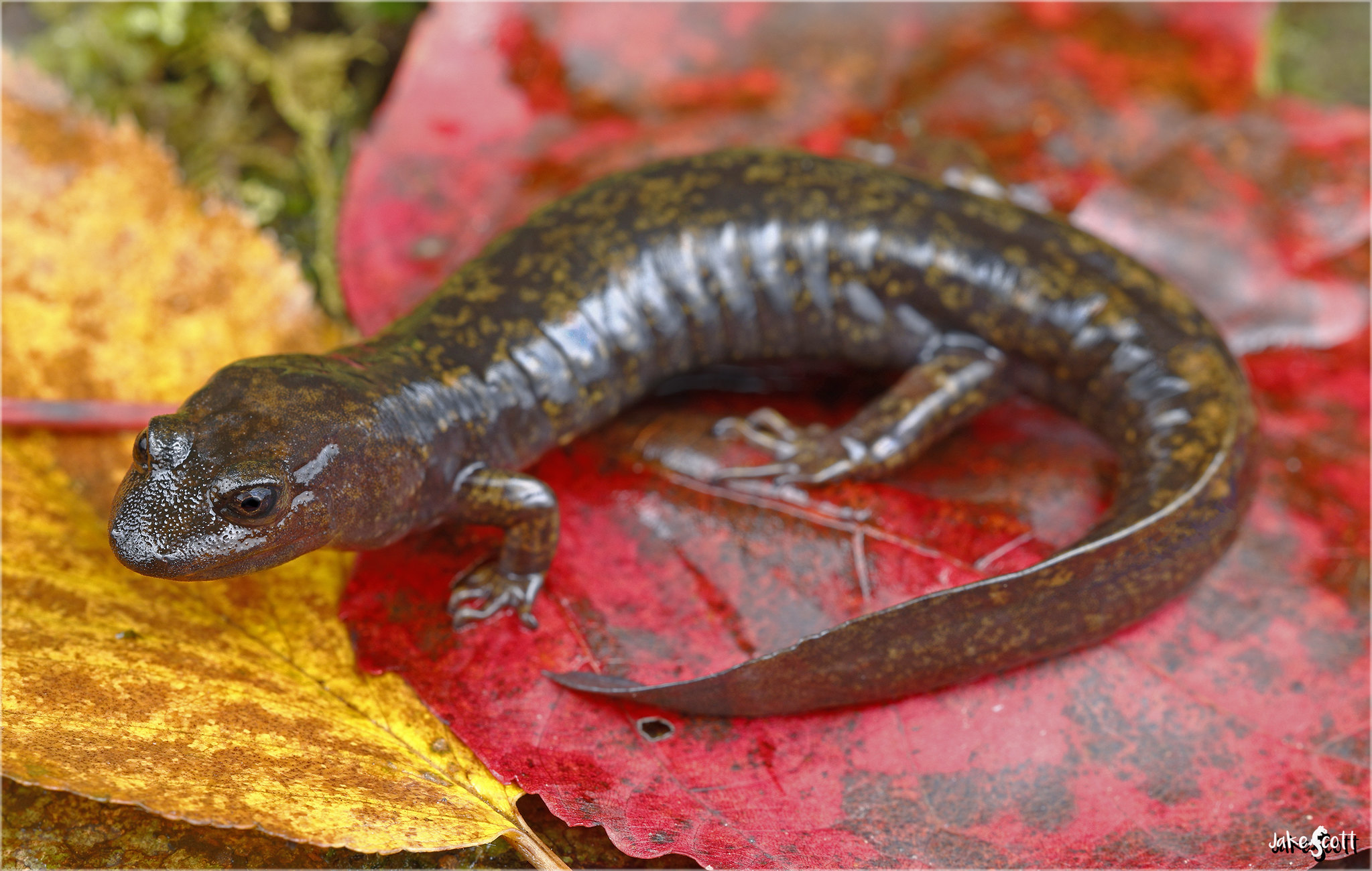

Conservation status
- Least Concern (IUCN 3.1)

Scientific classification
- Kingdom: Animalia
- Phylum: Chordata
- Class: Amphibia
- Order: Urodela
- Family: Plethodontidae
- Genus: Desmognathus
- Species: D. marmoratus

Binomial name
- Desmognathus marmoratus (Moore, 1899)

Synonyms
- Leurognathus marmorata Moore, 1899; Leurognathus marmoratus Moore, 1899

= Shovelnose salamander =

Species of amphibian

The shovelnose salamander (Desmognathus marmoratus) is a species of salamander in the family Plethodontidae. It is endemic to the United States.

== Taxonomy ==
The golden shovel-nosed salamander (D. aureatus) and black shovel-nosed salamander (D. melanius) were both described in 1956, then synonymized with D. marmoratus, but later revived as distinct species in 2009. However, their distinctiveness was quantified using mtDNA. Due to heavy mtDNA introgression between Desmognathus species being a major problem with delineating their taxonomy, both species are not recognized by other taxonomic authorities. However, they are provisionally recognized by Darrel Frost, unless proper counter-evidence is released.

== Description ==
The shovelnose salamander is a robust species, broad with a relatively short tail. Adults can grow to 3.5-5 in (9-12.5 cm) in length. It receives its name from the shape of its snout which is more square ended than is seen in other salamanders in its genus. The colour is a dusky brown, grey, or black with two longitudinal rows of paler small patches and many smaller pale speckles. The underside is usually grey.

== Distribution and habitat ==
The shovelnose salamander is found in the Appalachian Mountains in the southeastern United States at 300 to 1,680 metres (980 to 5,510 ft) above sea level. It is (provisionally) thought to range from Virginia south through North Carolina to South Carolina. Populations in Tennessee and Georgia are thought to belong to D. aureatus and D. melanius, although this is still debated. It is found in shallow, flowing water, rapids and riffles on gravel and rocky substrates, but is not found in silted streams.

== Behaviour ==
The shovelnose salamander is an aquatic species, living and feeding in moderately fast-flowing streams. Although it shares its range with the blackbelly salamander (Desmognathus quadramaculatus), the two species come into contact little, because the blackbelly mostly lies half out of the water and forages on land. The shovelnose salamander does not have a fixed home range nor exhibit territorial behaviour as does the blackbelly.

Breeding takes place in late spring and early summer. The female attaches eggs singly or in small clumps to the underside of a rock in moving water. The eggs hatch after about eleven weeks and the larvae hide among the gravel particles and feed on aquatic invertebrates. They undergo metamorphosis into adults at two to three years of age and mature at about five.

== Status ==
The shovelnose salamander is listed as being of "Least Concern" by the IUCN Red List of Threatened Species. This is because it is presumed to have a large population and any decline in numbers is slow. It is affected by silting of the streams in which it lives through logging, agriculture and impoundment but occurs in a number of protected areas. Numbers are also reduced by its use by fishermen as bait.
