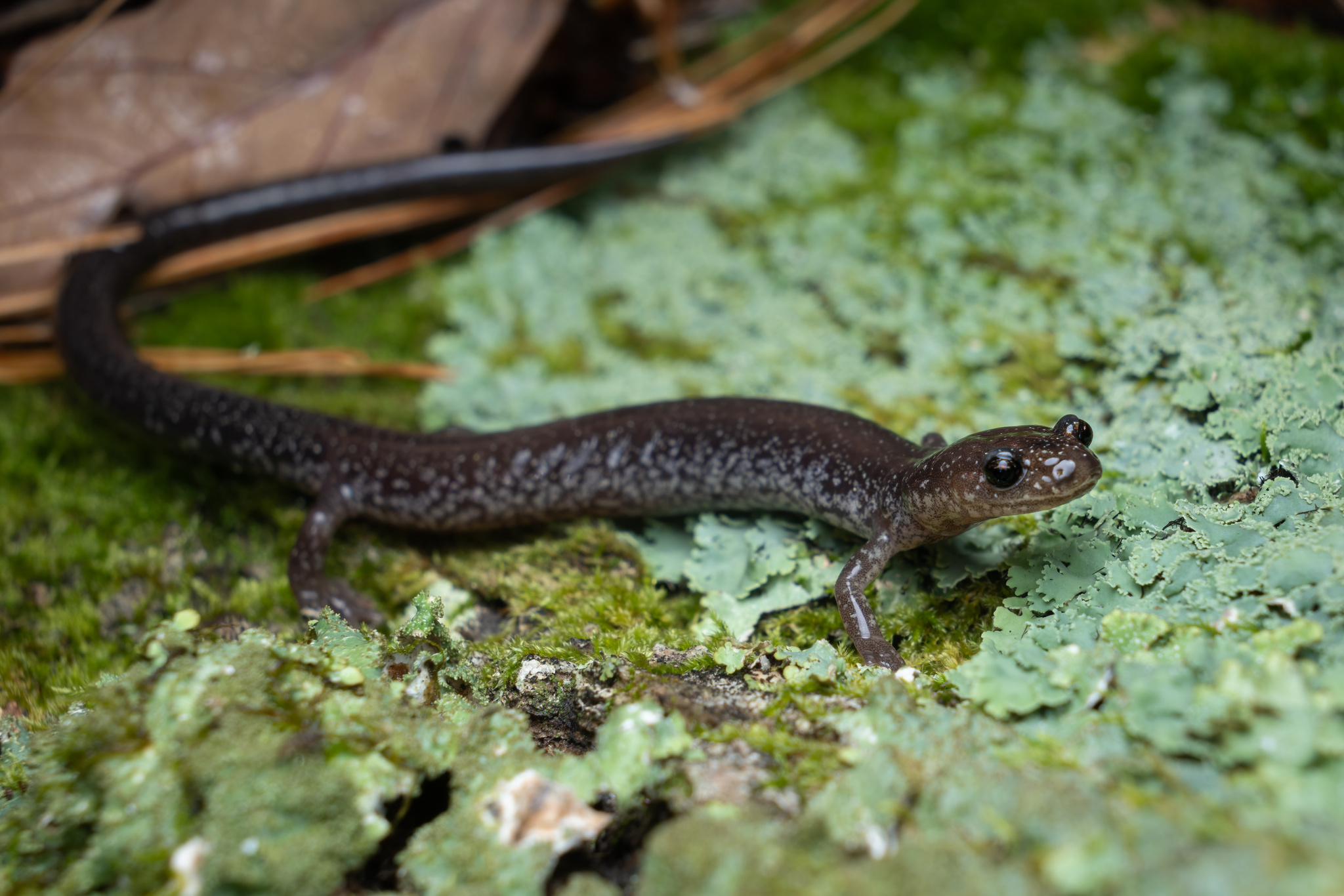

Conservation status
- Near Threatened (IUCN 3.1)

Scientific classification
- Kingdom: Animalia
- Phylum: Chordata
- Class: Amphibia
- Order: Urodela
- Family: Plethodontidae
- Genus: Plethodon
- Species: P. virginia

Binomial name
- Plethodon virginia Highton, 1999

= Shenandoah Mountain salamander =

Species of amphibian

The Shenandoah Mountain salamander (Plethodon virginia) is a species of salamander in the family Plethodontidae native to the eastern United States. It should not be confused with the Shenandoah salamander (P. shenandoah), which inhabits Shenandoah National Park, east of Shenandoah Mountain.

== Distribution ==
The species is endemic to Shenandoah Mountain, South Branch Mountain and Nathaniel Mountain of the Appalachian Mountains, in eastern West Virginia and adjacent northwestern Virginia. Its natural habitat is temperate forests between 500 and 1,200 metres (1,600 and 3,900 ft) in elevation.

It is an IUCN Red List near-threatened species, endangered by habitat loss, primarily by logging and tree death or defoliation caused by Hemlock woolly adelgid and spongy moth infestations.
