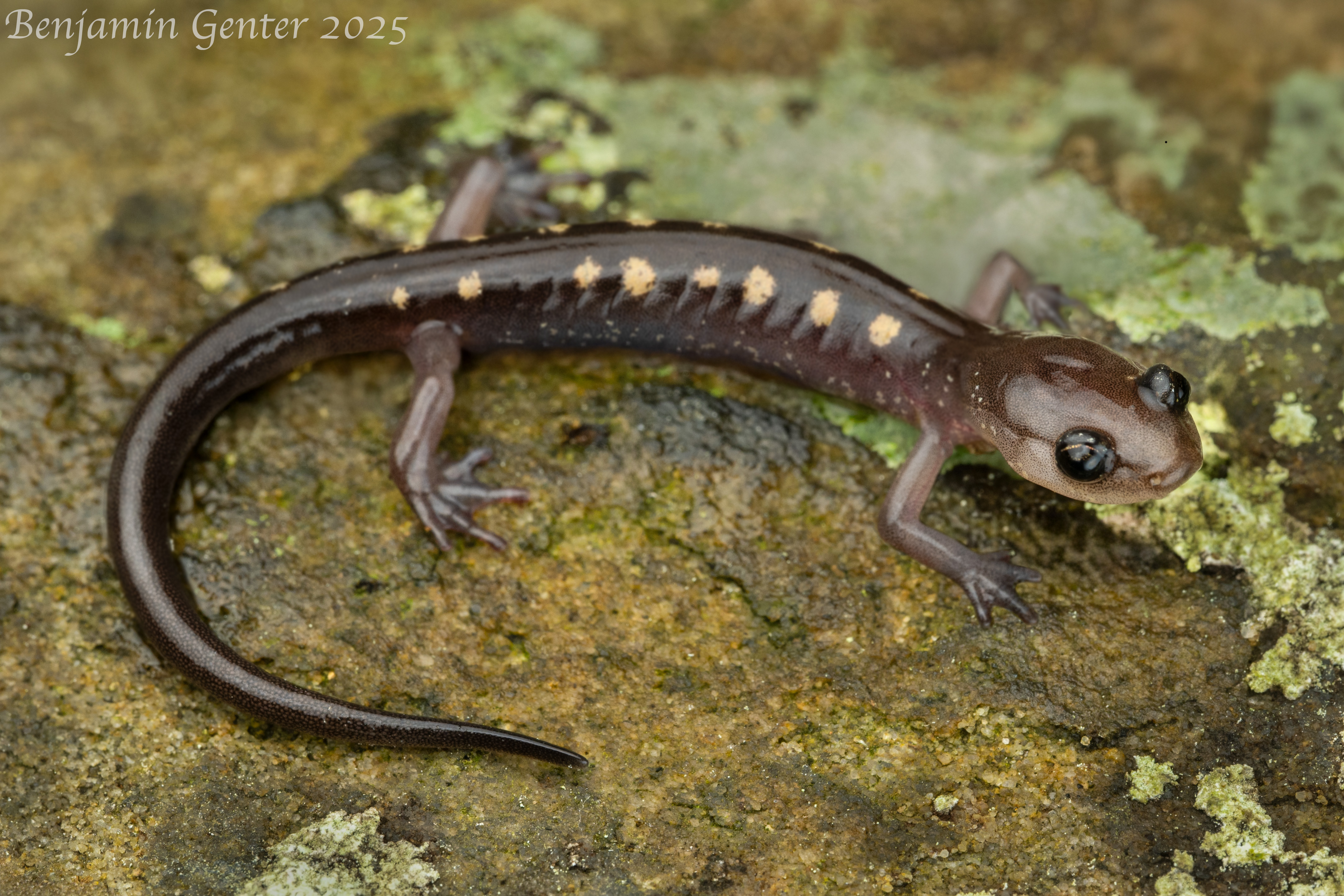
- Adult from Tennessee

Conservation status
- Data Deficient (IUCN 3.1)

Scientific classification
- Kingdom: Animalia
- Phylum: Chordata
- Class: Amphibia
- Order: Urodela
- Family: Plethodontidae
- Genus: Plethodon
- Species: P. pauleyi

Binomial name
- Plethodon pauleyi Felix, Wooten, Pierson, and Camp, 2019

= Yellow-spotted woodland salamander =

Species of amphibian

The yellow-spotted woodland salamander (Plethodon pauleyi) is a species of salamander in the family Plethodontidae. It is endemic to the United States, where it is distributed throughout the Cumberland Plateau in the states of Kentucky and Tennessee. Its natural habitat is temperate forest. It was long considered to be both an isolated western population and a unique yellow-spotted color morph of the Wehrle's salamander (P. wehrlei), but a study published in 2019 found it to be a distinct species.
