= Shenandoah Mountain =

Mountain in Virginia and West Virginia, United States

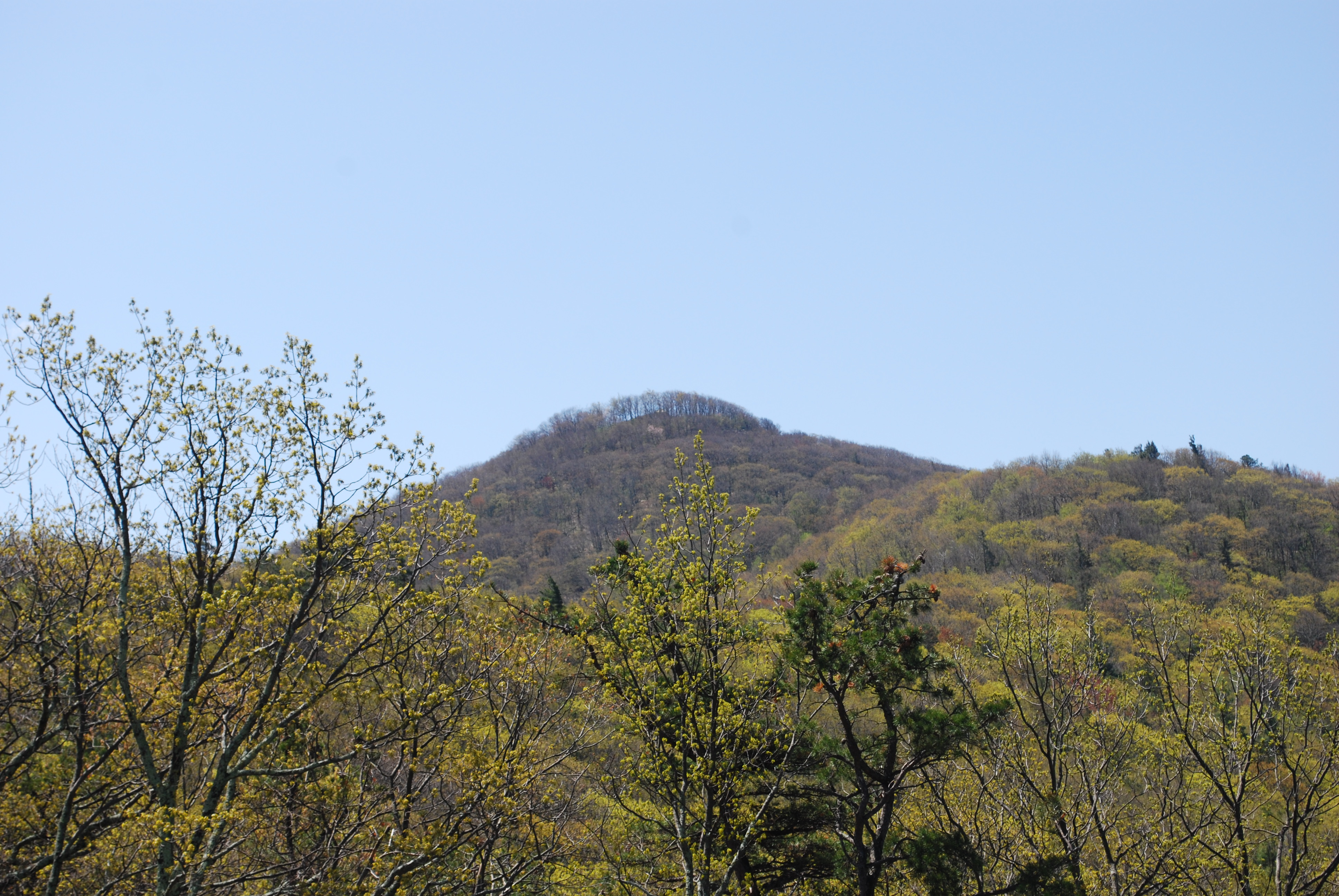
- High Knob on Shenandoah Mountain

Highest point
- Peak: Reddish Knob, Augusta County, VA and Pendleton County, WV
- Elevation: 4,397 ft (1,340 m)
- Coordinates: 38°27′44″N 79°14′30″W

Dimensions
- Length: 73 mi (117 km)

Geography
- Location within Virginia
- Country: United States
- States: Virginia; West Virginia
- Counties: Rockingham VA; Pendleton WV; Bath VA; Augusta VA; Highland VA; Hardy WV
- Range coordinates: 38°30′35″N 79°11′03″W
- Topo maps: List of USGS topos: Milam; Williamsville; Deerfield; McDowell; West Augusta; Palo Alto; Reddish Knob; Brandywine; Fort Seybert; Cow Knob; Bergton; Lost River State Park

Geology
- Mountain type: Ridge

Shenandoah Mountain is a mountain ridge approximately 73 miles (117 km) long in Virginia and West Virginia. The steep, narrow, sandstone-capped ridge extends from northern Bath County, Virginia to southern Hardy County, West Virginia. Along the way, its crest defines the borders between Highland and Augusta counties, Virginia, and between Pendleton County, West Virginia, and Rockingham County, Virginia. Its high point is 4397’/1340 m Reddish Knob along the Virginia/West Virginia border.

Located in the Ridge and Valley physiographic province of the Appalachian Mountains, Shenandoah Mountain forms part of the western margin of the Shenandoah Valley, and is part of the easternmost Allegheny Mountains. It lies almost entirely within the George Washington National Forest. U.S. Route 33 crosses the mountain between Franklin, West Virginia, and Harrisonburg, Virginia.

Other Shenandoah Mountain high peaks are Flagpole Knob (Virginia; 4383’/1336 m), and Bald Knob (Virginia; 3680’/1122 m).

== See also ==
- Shenandoah Mountain salamander
