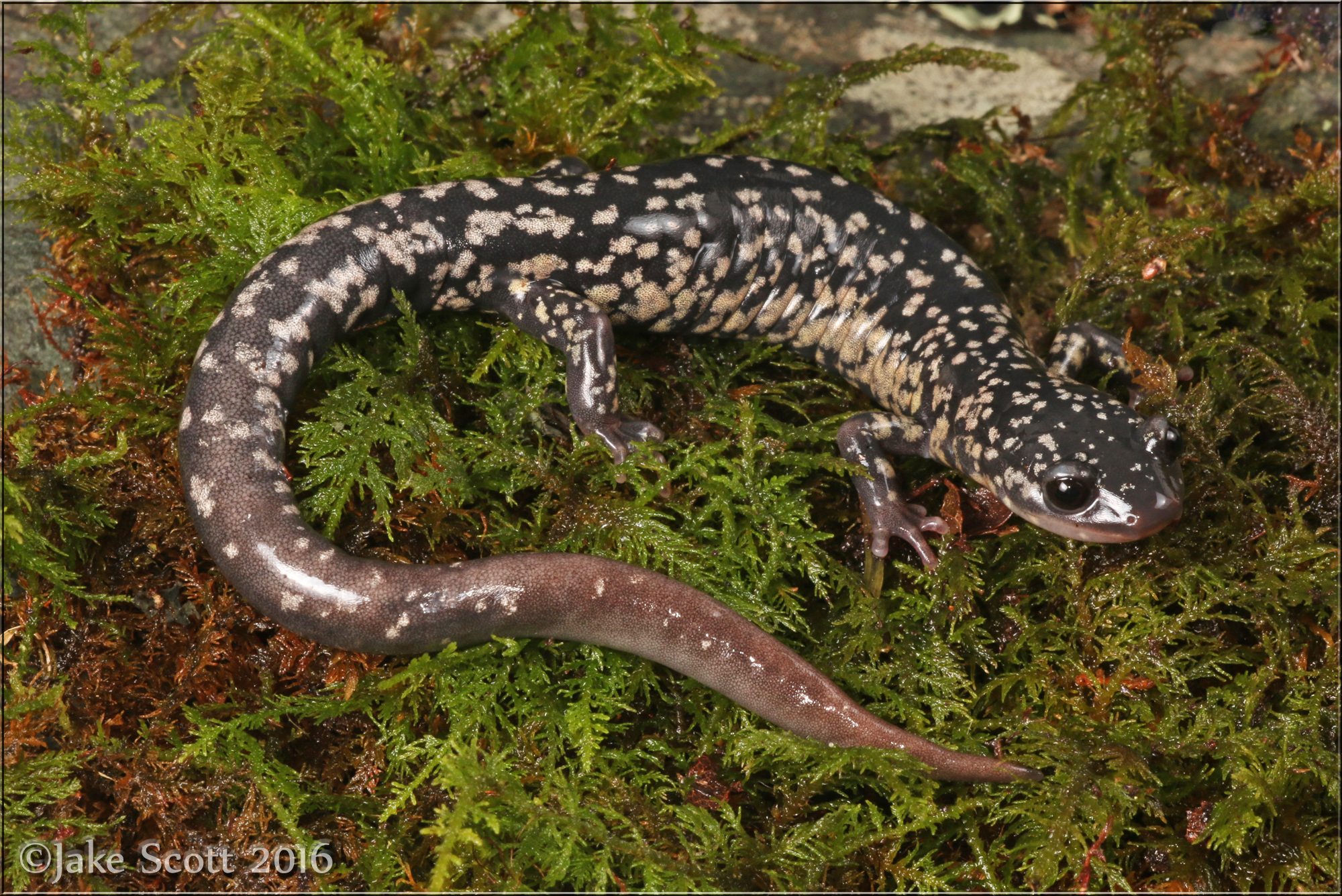

Conservation status
- Least Concern (IUCN 3.1)

Scientific classification
- Kingdom: Animalia
- Phylum: Chordata
- Class: Amphibia
- Order: Urodela
- Family: Plethodontidae
- Genus: Plethodon
- Species: P. cylindraceus

Binomial name
- Plethodon cylindraceus (Harlan, 1825)

= White-spotted slimy salamander =

Species of amphibian

The white-spotted slimy salamander (Plethodon cylindraceus) is a species of salamander in the family Plethodontidae endemic to the Eastern United States. It is one of 55 species in the genus Plethodon, and was one of the first to be described of its cogeners. The preferred habitat of this species is under logs and leaf litter in shaded hardwood forests and wooded floodplains, and often forages on the forest floor on wet nights. It was found that with increasing temperatures, the aggression in this species also increases. In the Plethodon genus, species have a lungless morphology, restricting nearly all gas and water exchange transport to the body surface. This species mainly consumes insects, including ants, centipedes, springtails, crickets, millipedes, slugs, snout-beetles, and earthworms. Common predators of this species are gartersnakes, copperheads, and birds. One of their predator defense mechanisms is the release of noxious/sticky substances through the skin by the dorsal granular glands. Another predator deterrent is when touched, this species will freeze in place and become immobile. This species of Plethodon are mostly terrestrial and deposit their direct-developing eggs on land that omits the aquatic larval stage characteristic of most amphibians, therefore this species is not restricted to aquatic habitats for reproduction and dispersal. This species, along with other Plethodontid salamanders, are frequently parasitized by Trombicula mites.

== Distribution ==
This species is found in the Virginia Piedmont and Blue Ridge physiographic provinces of Virginia and North Carolina, west to the French Broad River, and south to the northern Piedmont of South Carolina, and parts of the Valley and Ridge physiographic province of the Appalachian Mountains in western Virginia and extreme eastern West Virginia, and in a small area of the Atlantic Coastal Plain of eastern Virginia.

Its natural habitat is temperate forest, and is threatened by habitat loss.
