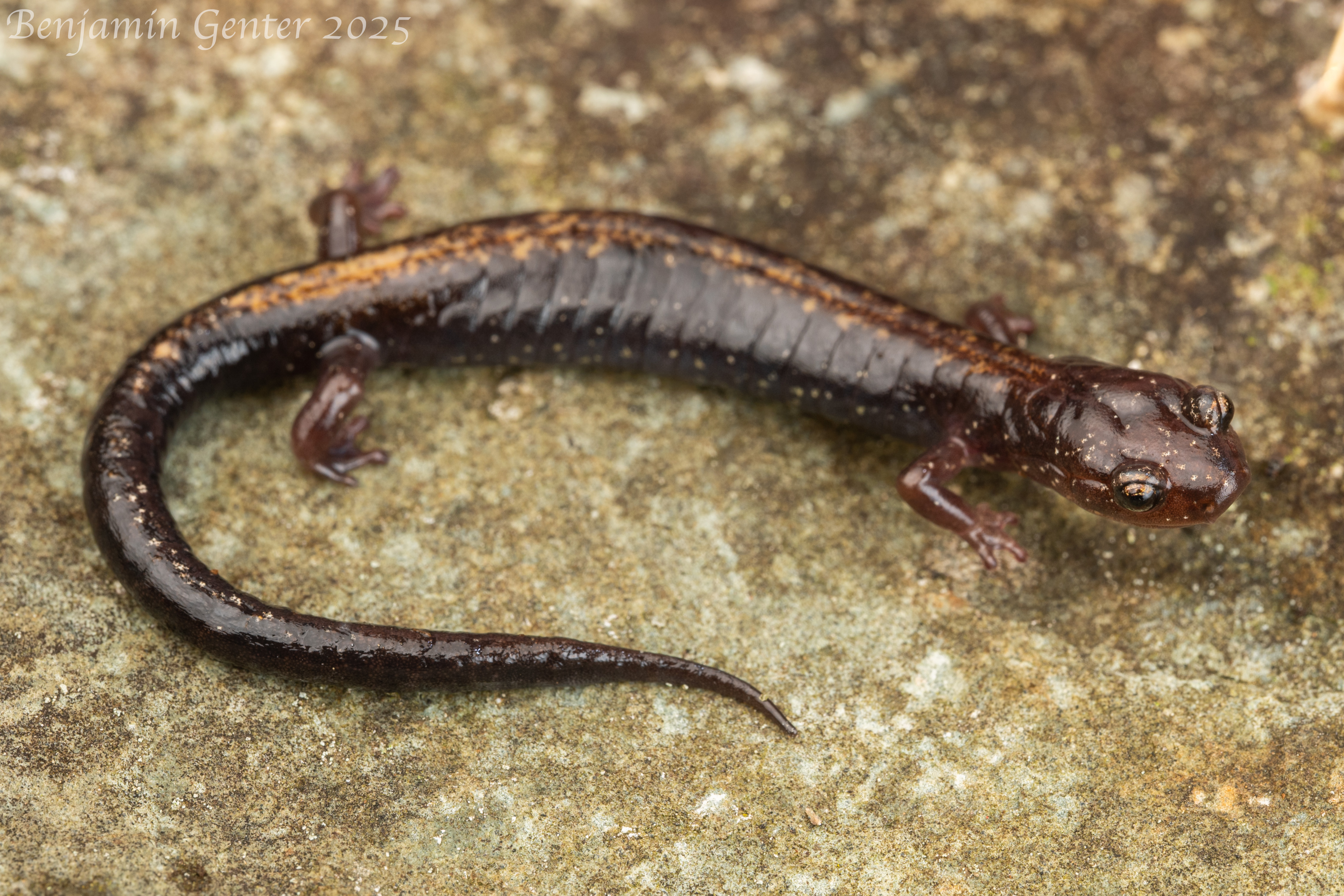

Conservation status
- Critically Endangered (IUCN 3.1)

- Endangered (ESA)

Scientific classification
- Kingdom: Animalia
- Phylum: Chordata
- Class: Amphibia
- Order: Urodela
- Family: Plethodontidae
- Genus: Plethodon
- Species: P. shenandoah

Binomial name
- Plethodon shenandoah Highton and Worthington, 1967
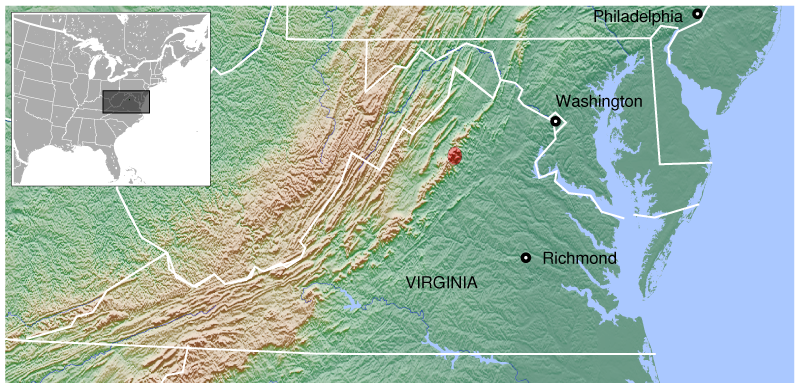
- The habitat of the Shenandoah salamander is limited to 3 talus slopes within the Shenandoah National Park in Virginia

Synonyms
- Plethodon richmondi shenandoah Highton and Worthington, 1967

= Shenandoah salamander =

Species of amphibian

The Shenandoah salamander (Plethodon shenandoah) is a small, terrestrial salamander found exclusively in Shenandoah National Park in Virginia. The Shenandoah salamander inhabits a very small range of land on just three mountain peaks. Due to the small habitat range, interspecies competition, and climate change, the population of the Shenandoah salamander is vulnerable to extinction. Mitigating human effects on the habitat of the species will be essential in attempting to preserve and grow the population.

== Description ==
The adult Shenandoah salamander is slender and moderate in size, with a total length of 3.5 to 4.5 inches (7 cm - 10 cm). The species has two distinct color phases: striped and unstriped. The striped color phase has a narrow stripe down the center of its back that can range in color from red to yellow, while the unstriped color phase is uniformly dark with occasional scattered brass-colored flecks. In both color phases, white or yellow spots occur along the sides of the body. The Shenandoah salamander is similar in appearance to the red-backed salamander (Plethodon cinereus). However, the two species can be distinguished in many ways. The stripe on the Shenandoah salamander takes up one-third of its dorsal area, while the stripe on the red-backed salamander is wider and takes up approximately two-thirds of the dorsal area. In addition, the Shenandoah salamander lacks the "salt and pepper" color pattern on its underside that is characteristic of P. cinereus, and has a slightly larger and more broadly rounded head. Shenandoah salamanders are members of the family Plethondontidae, the lungless salamanders that breathe through the surface of their skin. Due to the lack of lungs, successful respiration depends on the ability to maintain skin moisture, thus restricting body size and necessitating a moist environment such as forested areas. This species is chiefly nocturnal, hunting for food at night and taking cover in dark, damp locations like rock crevices and underneath logs during the day.

== Life history ==
Like most woodland salamanders, the Shenandoah salamander eats mites, flies, small beetles, springtails, and other soil invertebrates. No direct observation of predation of the Shenandoah salamander has ever been reported, but potential predators residing within the habitat of the Shenandoah salamander include ring-necked snakes, short-tailed shrews, brown thrashers, and towhees. The Shenandoah salamander's life history is not well understood, though adult salamanders have a high survival rate, some even reaching 25 years of age. Like many salamanders, the breeding season for the Shenandoah salamander occurs during late spring or summer. Female salamanders do not breed prior to 4 years of age and lay an average clutch size of 13 eggs every other year. Clutches are laid in areas of moisture and incubate for 1–3 months. Fertilization occurs internally and the entire developmental process takes place within the egg—there is no aquatic larval stage. For the duration of the incubation period, females guard the nest and do not forage.

All salamanders, including the Shenandoah salamander, have an important impact on ecosystem functions. Salamanders regulate population dynamics via predation of insects and other invertebrates, aerate the soil through burrowing behavior, and influence large-scale processes such as decomposition.

== Distribution ==
=== Habitat range ===
The Shenandoah salamander species is believed to have originated in the Appalachians of eastern North America, though the historical abundance of this species is unknown. Currently, Shenandoah salamanders are exclusively found on the north-facing talus slopes of three mountains within the Shenandoah National Park in Virginia: Hawksbill, The Pinnacles, and Stony Man (see range map). Each of the three talus slopes houses an isolated salamander population residing at approximately 3,000 feet above sea level. The talus slopes are typically dry, so the Shenandoah salamander is generally found within moist microhabitats scattered throughout the talus environment. Although the dry talus slopes are not optimal, the Shenandoah salamander is excluded from optimal forested areas containing deep, moist soil due to competition with the red-backed salamander.

=== Population size ===
Based on data from 2008/2009 there was a population estimate between 110,262 and 140,625, but current population trends and estimates cannot be established until surveys with marked animals are conducted.

== Major threats ==
=== Red-backed salamander ===
The Shenandoah salamander species is threatened by competition by the aggressive red-backed salamander, which restricts the Shenandoah salamander to dry, sub-optimal talus environments and prevents Shenandoah salamander populations from expanding into heavily forested areas. Furthermore, the talus habitat of the Shenandoah salamander is in a state of disintegration due to erosion. Eventually, this weathering will result in soil formation and a subsequent increase in moisture, thus making the talus environment suitable for red-backed salamander invasion and increasing the possibility of extinction of the Shenandoah salamander species

Both laboratory and field experiments have provided evidence of the red-backed salamander's aggressive, territorial behavior toward the Shenandoah salamander. The two species compete for large cover objects that provide cool temperatures and high moisture levels, but the territoriality of P. cinereus results in competitive exclusion of the Shenandoah salamander from moist soil environments. As a result, the Shenandoah salamander, which has a higher tolerance for dry conditions, is restricted to the talus slope environments in which the red-backed salamander cannot survive.

=== Invasive species ===
Invasive insect species in the Shenandoah National Park, namely the gypsy moth (Lymantria dispar dispar) and the hemlock woolly adelgid (Adelges tsugae), also threaten the survival of the Shenandoah salamander. Gypsy moth larvae feed on tree leaves, resulting in widespread defoliation and tree mortality. This loss of overstory dramatically alters the Shenandoah salamander habitat, reducing the ground moisture and potentially altering the Shenandoah salamander's ability to catch prey. Hemlock woolly adelgids are a major cause of hemlock tree mortality within Shenandoah National Park, contributing to overstory loss and talus slope habitat dehydration. In addition, hemlock mortality increases the amount of hemlock needles in the soil, which lowers the pH of the soil. Acid deposition due to acid rain and/or air pollution also contributes to soil acidification and has been well-documented in Shenandoah National Park. Although the direct effects of soil acidification on the Shenandoah salamander have not been documented, studies have shown that amphibians are extremely vulnerable to this process. These results suggest that soil acidification within the Shenandoah salamander habitat could reduce reproduction, affect food supply, lower egg hatchability, and increase newborn salamander mortality.

=== Chytrid fungus ===
Batrachochytrium salamandrivorans or salamander chytrid fungus causes the infectious disease chytridiomycosis, which is considered to be a large factor in the declining populations of amphibians globally. In 2016, an interim rule by the U.S. Fish and Wildlife Service (USFWS) added all species of salamander to the list of injurious amphibians. This rule prevented the importation or transportation of any live of dead specimens, including parts, of the 20 genera of salamanders into the United States and interstate transportation between States, the District of Columbia, the Commonwealth of Puerto Rico, or any territory or possession of the United States. Only with the exception of permit for zoological, educational, medical, or scientific purposes or by Federal agencies without a permit solely for their own use. This interim rule was a proactive rule to protect the wildlife from the introduction, establishment, and spread of Batrachochytrium salamandrivorans. While this fungus had a lethal effect on many salamander species, it was not currently known to be found in the United States; however, the potential introduction of the fungus upon the salamander species could have an incredibly devastating effect.

=== Anthropogenic factors ===
Anthropogenic factors also appear to potentially further endanger the Shenandoah salamander. In the 1994 recovery plan, it was thought that further debilitation of overstory vegetation, changes in soil chemistry, and direct impacts to the salamanders associated with acid deposition and other sources of air pollution were potential threats. While there were no effects of acid deposition and other sources of air pollution on the Shenandoah salamander, there have been numerous studies which indicate amphibians to be very vulnerable to effects of acid deposition, especially in montane areas. Acidification of the habitat could affect the salamander's food supply, could impair reproduction by affecting courtship, egg hatchability, or neonatal viability. Studies showed that soil acidity decreased the abundance of the red-backed salamander, making it likely for the Shenandoah salamander to also be negatively affected. Finally, there was the potential disturbance to the habitat of the Shenandoah salamander due to hiking trail maintenance, use, and backcountry camping.

==== Climate change ====
Climate change also directly impacts the habitat of the Shenandoah salamander. Cloud base elevation, which is influenced by climate variables, is likely to continue to shrink the suitable range of the Shenandoah salamander. One study found that elevation is strongly correlated with the lower elevation range boundary for the Shenandoah salamander, despite previous assumptions that the range was limited only to competitive interactions. The lower elevational range is sensitive to climate variables, so climate change in high elevation habitats will directly affect the species' distribution.

== Conservation status ==
In December 1982, the U.S. Fish and Wildlife Service categorized the Shenandoah salamander as a "Category 2" in its Review of Vertebrate Wildlife for Listing as Endangered or Threatened Species. In 1989, the Shenandoah salamander was formally classified as "Endangered" under the Endangered Species Act (ESA).

The Shenandoah salamander was first listed as Endangered (E) by the IUCN in 1994, and retained its Endangered status in a 1996 assessment. In 2004, the Shenandoah salamander was listed as Vulnerable D2 (VU) by the IUCN, with the justification that it was found in only three locations.

=== Critical habitat ===
In 2015, the Center for Biological Diversity presented a petition for designating a critical habitat for nine species including the Shenandoah salamander. The Center requested that the U.S. Fish and Wildlife Service designate 16,891 acres within the Shenandoah National Park as critical habitat for the Shenandoah salamander. As the salamander requires very specific habitat conditions, and is restricted to the high-elevation mountains in Virginia, it is under an increasing threat from climate change, invasive species, pollution, and human activities. Designating this area as a critical habitat would address potentially incompatible Park Service management and would be beneficial for the conservation of the salamander species.

== Current conservation efforts ==
=== Original 1994 Recovery Plan ===
The 1994 recovery plan explained that due to the interspecific competition, the Shenandoah salamander differs from other listed species. Because of this competition, it would not be advisable to attempt to increase population numbers, transplant individuals, or reduce naturally occurring competitors. Attempts to repopulate the salamander on talus areas between or adjacent to known populations would be unfeasible, costly, and unnecessary. Instead, recovery attempts should focus on minimizing human-related impacts on the Shenandoah and red-backed salamander populations.

The actions needed for the recovery of the Shenandoah salamander included determining the boundaries of occupied habitat and to determine if additional populations exist, monitoring the known salamander populations on a long-term basis, determining and minimizing the impact of human-related factors such as herbicides and air-pollutants on the salamander, investigating aspects of the salamander's life history, ensuring compatibility of park maintenance and management activities with the salamander populations, and promoting information exchange on the salamander. This recovery plan was estimated to take 3 fiscal years with a total cost of $155,000.

=== 5-Year reviews ===
In both 2008 and 2012, a 5-Year Review of several species, including the Shenandoah salamander, was conducted. These reviews aimed to find whether these species were properly classified under the Endangered Species Act. In both reviews the Shenandoah salamander retained the status of "endangered".

=== Biological Opinion by the U.S. Fish and Wildlife Service ===
In 2012, the USFWS submitted a Biological Opinion on the National Park Service's (NPS) management activities, which highlighted some proposed actions to protect the areas of the Shenandoah National Park. This proposed action in fire management, natural resource protection, and natural resource monitoring and research. A policy that would specifically impact the Shenandoah salamander was the proposed aerial spraying of Bacillus thuringiensis as a pest management technique to reduce the impact of gypsy moths.

=== Supplemental Finding for the Shenandoah Salamander Recovery Plan ===
An additional resource to the Shenandoah salamander recovery plan was published in July, 2019. This resource explained why it remained impractical, as of 2019, to de-list the Shenandoah salamander. In 1994, the sole threat to the species was competition with the red-backed salamander. In the absence of anthropogenic threats, the USFWS determined that it was not possible to establish criteria to de-list or down-list the species in the foreseeable future. As the species is endemic to higher elevations and the range is protected by the National Park Services, human impacts are minimized.

However, in the time since the 1994 recovery plan, available science has brought the original analysis into question. Since the recovery plan was established, evidence has emerged that climate change may be a primary threat to the species, potentially influencing competition.

=== Future conservation efforts ===
As of 2020, there have been no listing changes to the conservation status of the Shenandoah salamander. However, there are several studies set to begin in 2020 by the NPS and United States Geological Survey which will focus on why the Shenandoah salamander is exhibiting greater declines than most amphibian species, and biologists plan to develop a management plan at the conclusion of those studies. The future 5-Year Review (set for 2022) can assess the practicality of amending the recovery plan to include de-listing criteria and updating the plan to include additional threats.
