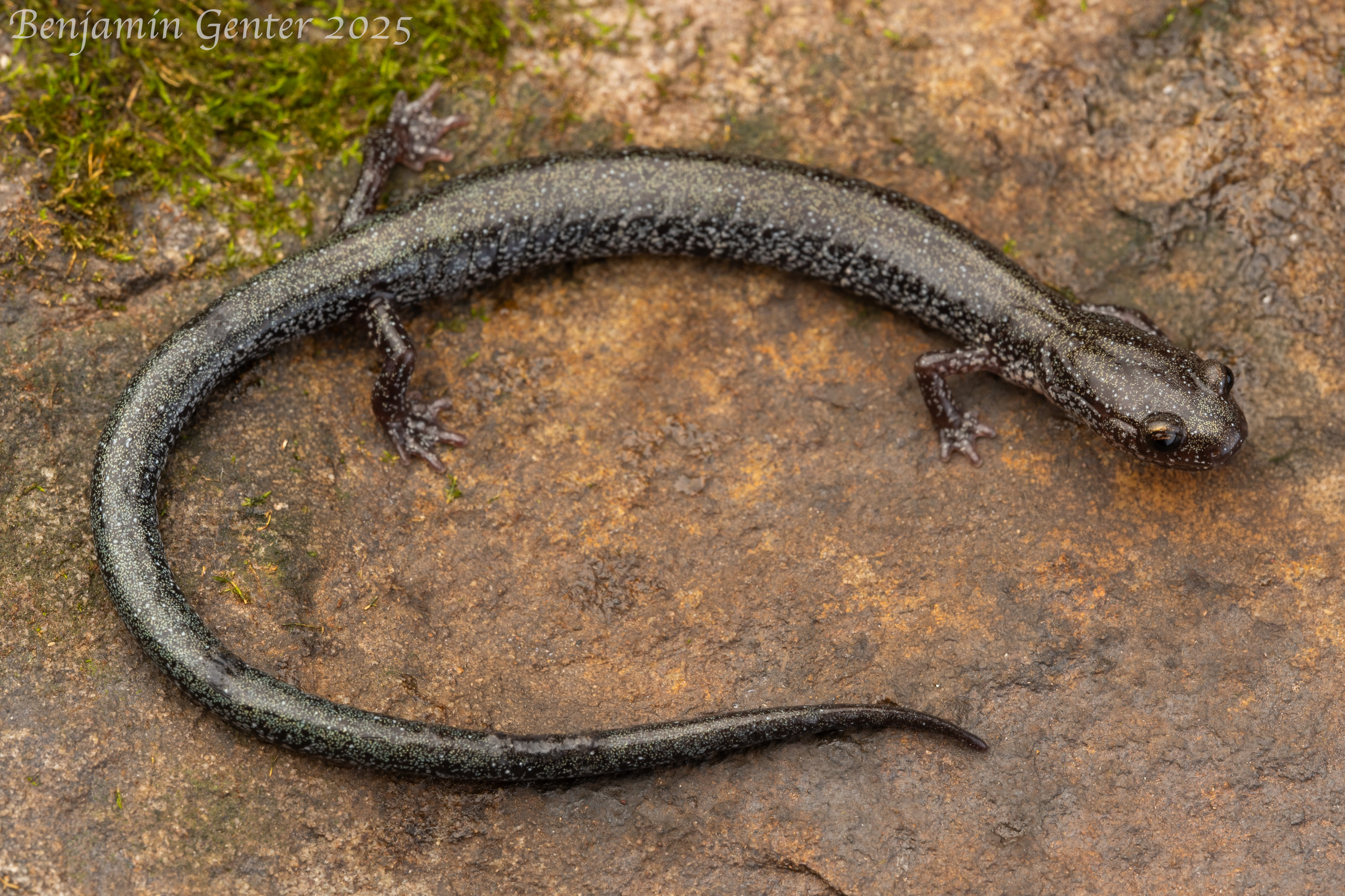
- From Rockbridge County, Virginia

Conservation status
- Least Concern (IUCN 3.1)

Scientific classification
- Kingdom: Animalia
- Phylum: Chordata
- Class: Amphibia
- Order: Urodela
- Family: Plethodontidae
- Genus: Plethodon
- Species: P. hoffmani

Binomial name
- Plethodon hoffmani Highton, 1972

= Valley and ridge salamander =

Species of amphibian

The valley and ridge salamander (Plethodon hoffmani) is a species of salamander in the family Plethodontidae endemic to the Appalachian Mountains in the eastern United States.

== Etymology ==
The species is named after biologist Richard Hoffman of Virginia, who collected the holotype specimen in 1954.

== Description ==
The valley and ridge salamander is a terrestrial salamander which a total length of 80 to 137 millimetres (3.1 to 5.4 in). This species is slender with short legs, a long tail, and 21 costal grooves. The dorsum is dark brown to blackish with scattered whitish or brassy flecks and the venter is dark with mottling, especially on the chin.

== Distribution ==
The natural habitat of the valley and ridge salamander is hardwood forests of the Valley and Ridge province of the Appalachian Mountains, up to 1,400 m (4,600 ft) in elevation. This species can be found in the Appalachians from the Susquehanna River Valley in central Pennsylvania, through western Maryland and eastern West Virginia, south to the New River in southwestern Virginia.

== Ecology ==
The species occurs in terrestrial valley and ridge physiography, generally in mature hardwood forests with well-drained soils. It lays eggs in moist cavities, where they develop directly without a larval stage. Individuals can be found under logs and rocks and tolerate cool weather well. In wet weather, they forage in leaf litter and as the surface dries, retreat to damp covered areas. They tend to be found on slightly drier slopes than their close relative, the red-backed salamander.
