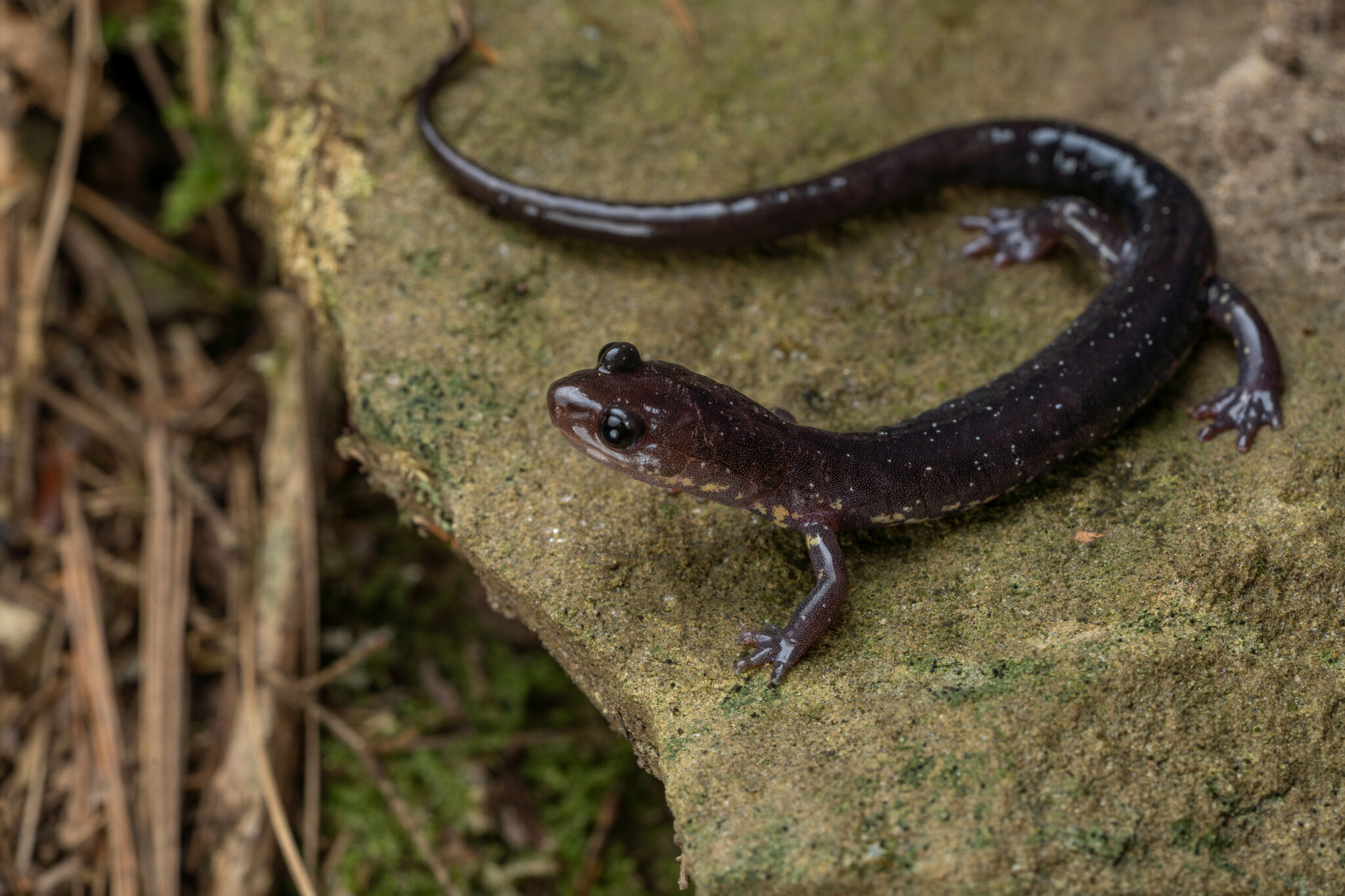

Conservation status
- Least Concern (IUCN 3.1)

Scientific classification
- Kingdom: Animalia
- Phylum: Chordata
- Class: Amphibia
- Order: Urodela
- Family: Plethodontidae
- Genus: Plethodon
- Species: P. wehrlei

Binomial name
- Plethodon wehrlei Fowler and Dunn, 1917

= Wehrle's salamander =

Species of amphibian

Wehrle's salamander (Plethodon wehrlei) is a species of salamander in the family Plethodontidae. It is endemic to the Eastern United States. It is named in honor of Richard White Wehrle (1852–1937), a jeweler, naturalist, and collector of the holotype.

== Geographic range ==
Wehrle's salamander ranges from New York south to Virginia. Populations in southwestern Virginia and northwestern North Carolina were reclassified as a distinct species, the Blacksburg salamander (P. jacksoni), which has been reaffirmed by a study published in 2019. An isolated cave-dwelling population in Virginia was also reclassified as distinct species, the Dixie Caverns salamander (P. dixi), also reaffirmed by a study published in 2019. The population on the Cumberland Plateau, formerly considered a yellow-spotted color morph, is now considered a new species, the yellow-spotted woodland salamander (P. pauleyi), which was described during the 2019 study.

== Description ==
It is bluish-black with big, scattered white spots on its back. Its sides are covered with white to yellow spots and blotches. Its belly and the ventral surface of the tail are solid gray, and the throat and upper chest usually have white or yellowish blotches. The species grows to a length of 10 to 17 centimeters (3.9 to 6.7 in).

== Reproduction ==
Mating occurs from fall through spring. A large cluster of eggs is laid in early summer in damp logs, soils or moss, and in crevices in caves. Reproduction is biennial or irregular, with many mature females failing to breed each year.

== Behavior and habitat ==
This species stays under cover during the day, and comes out to forage at night. This species is found on forested hillsides in the Appalachian Plateau, where it hides by day beneath stones or rocks. It is also found at the entrances of caves and deep rock crevices, as well as burrows under rocks and logs.
