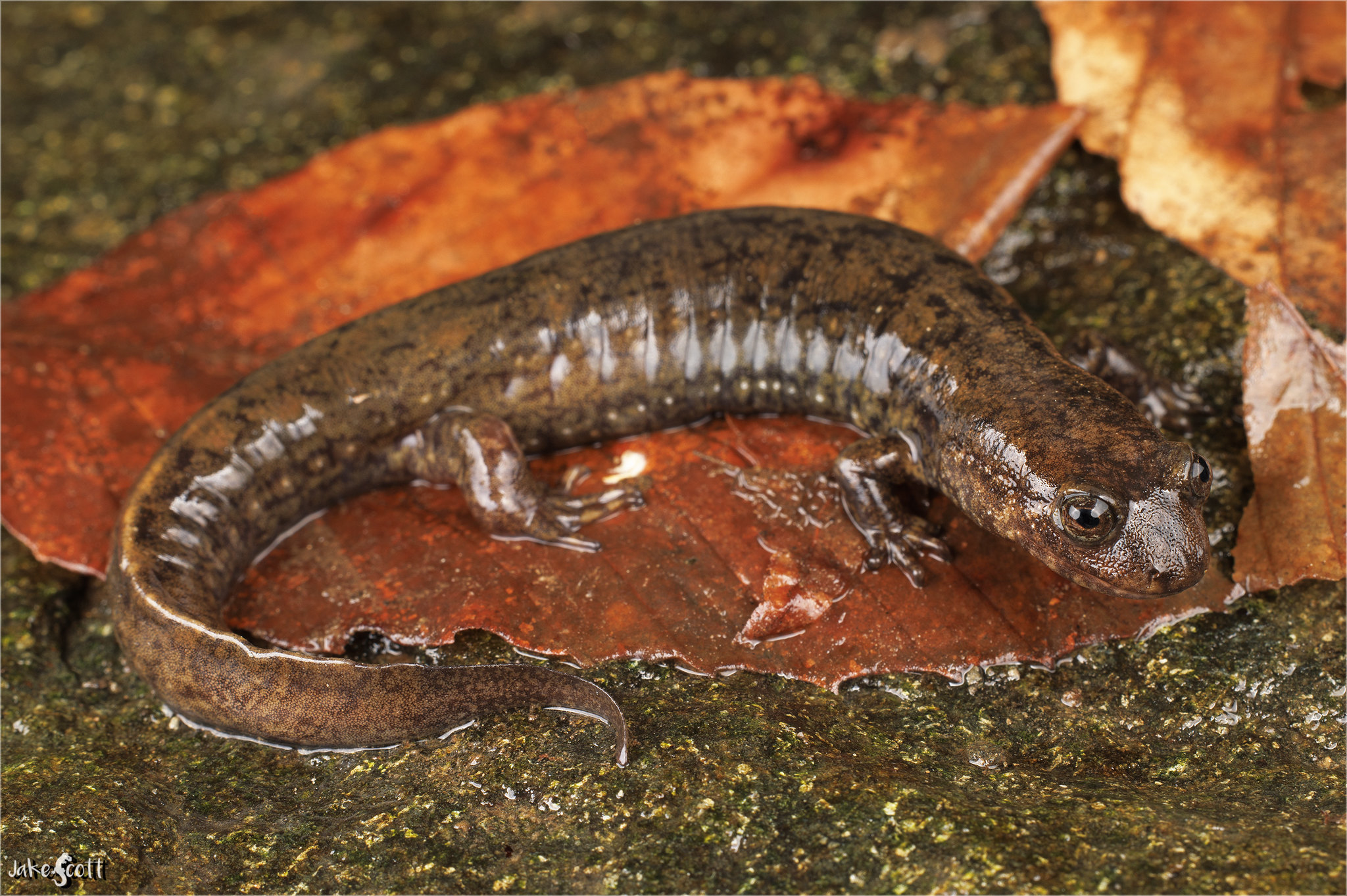

Scientific classification
- Kingdom: Animalia
- Phylum: Chordata
- Class: Amphibia
- Order: Urodela
- Family: Plethodontidae
- Genus: Desmognathus
- Species: D. mavrokoilus

Binomial name
- Desmognathus mavrokoilus Pyron and Beamer, 2022

= Pisgah black-bellied salamander =

Species of amphibian

The Pisgah black-bellied salamander or Blue Ridge black-bellied salamander (Desmognathus mavrokoilius) is a species of lungless salamander in the family Plethodontidae. It is endemic to the eastern United States, where it is only known from the southern Appalachian Mountains.

It ranges throughout the Blue Ridge Mountains of much of western North Carolina and eastern Tennessee north to extreme southwest Virginia, being bordered to the south by the eastern Great Smoky Mountains and southeastern Great Balsams, and to the north by Mount Rogers.

Initially grouped with the blackbelly salamander (D. quadramaculatus), a 2022 study found significant genetic divergence within the species, but also found that the name D. quadramaculatus had in fact been coined for the northern dusky salamander rather than the "blackbelly salamander". Its specific epithet, mavrokoilus, is Greek for "dark-bellied".
