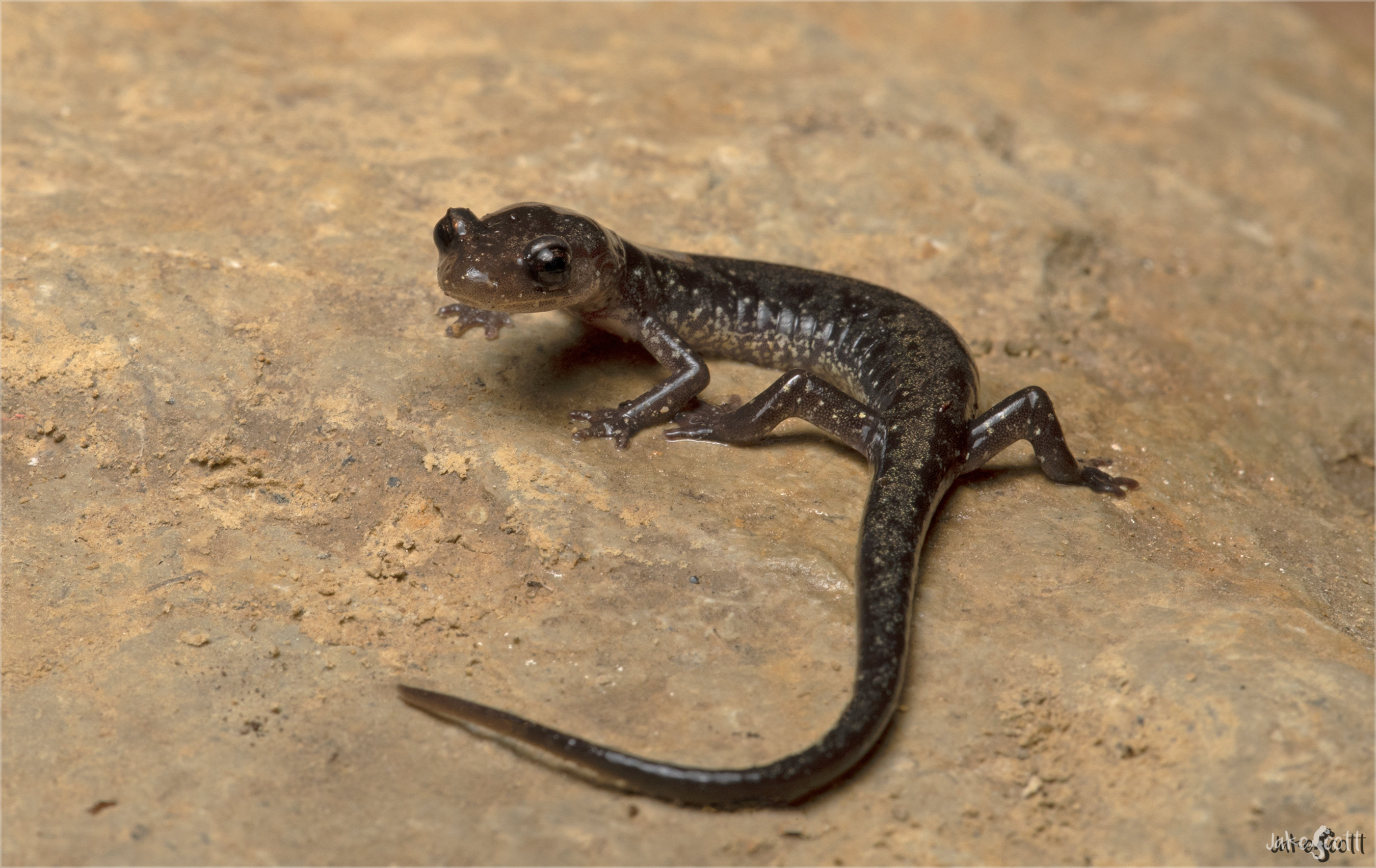

Conservation status
- Data Deficient (IUCN 3.1)

Scientific classification
- Kingdom: Animalia
- Phylum: Chordata
- Class: Amphibia
- Order: Urodela
- Family: Plethodontidae
- Genus: Plethodon
- Species: P. dixi

Binomial name
- Plethodon dixi Pope and Fowler, 1949

= Dixie Caverns salamander =

Species of amphibian

The Dixie Caverns salamander (Plethodon dixi) is a species of salamander in the family Plethodontidae. It is endemic to the state of Virginia in the United States. It is most often found in Roanoke County, but several specimens have been recorded in surrounding counties. It was commonly confused with Wehrle's salamander (P. wehrlei) and was merged with that species shortly after description, but a 2019 study reaffirmed it as a distinct species.
