= List of amphibians and reptiles of West Virginia =

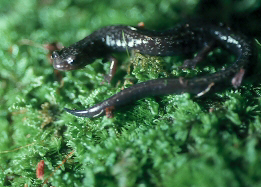
The Cheat Mountain salamander (Plethodon nettingi)

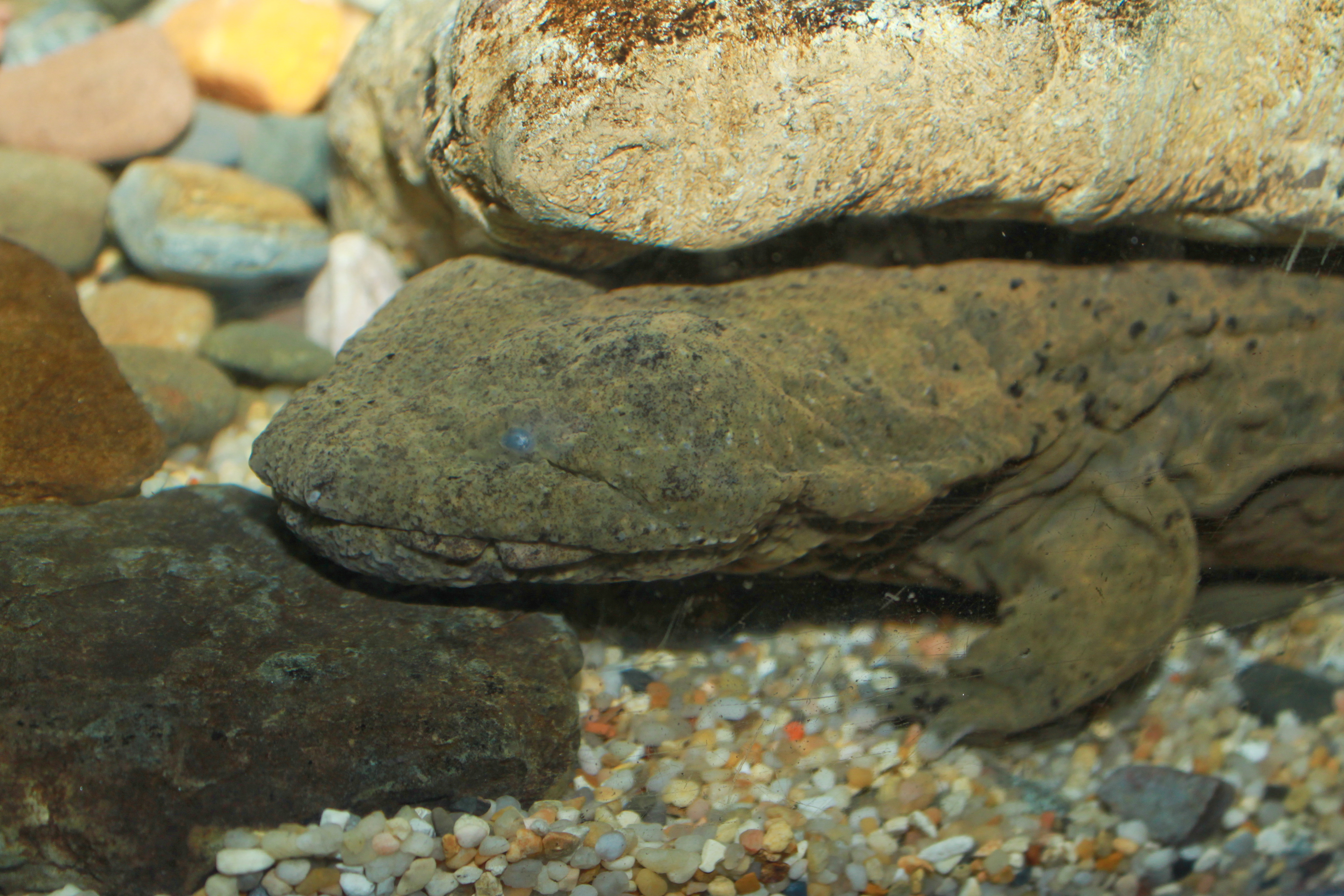
The hellbender (Cryptobranchus alleganiensis)

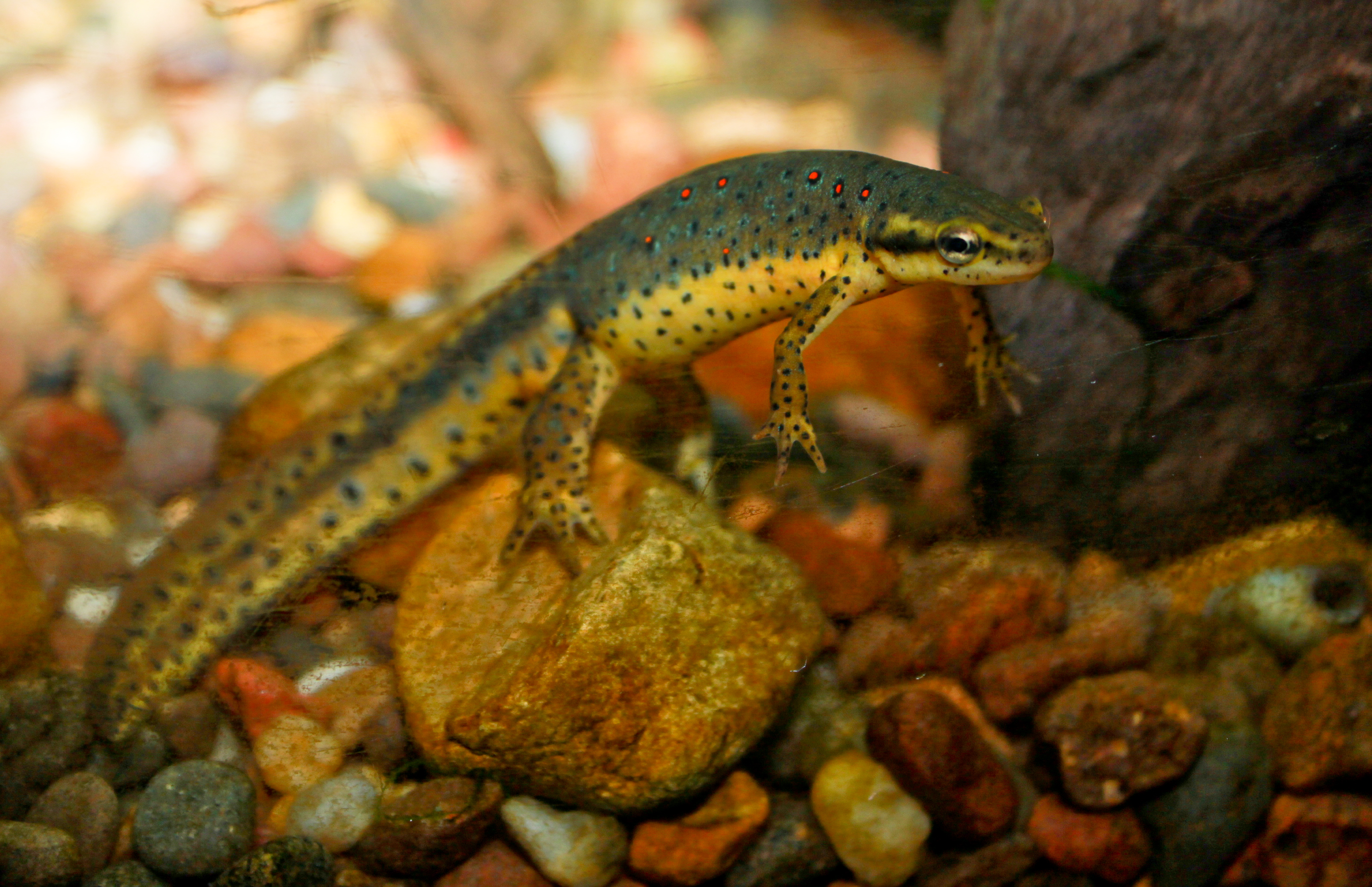
An adult red-spotted, or eastern, newt (Notophthalmus viridescens)

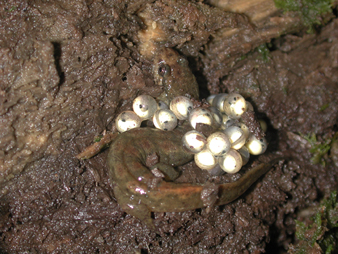
The northern dusky salamander (Desmognathus fuscus) with egg clutch

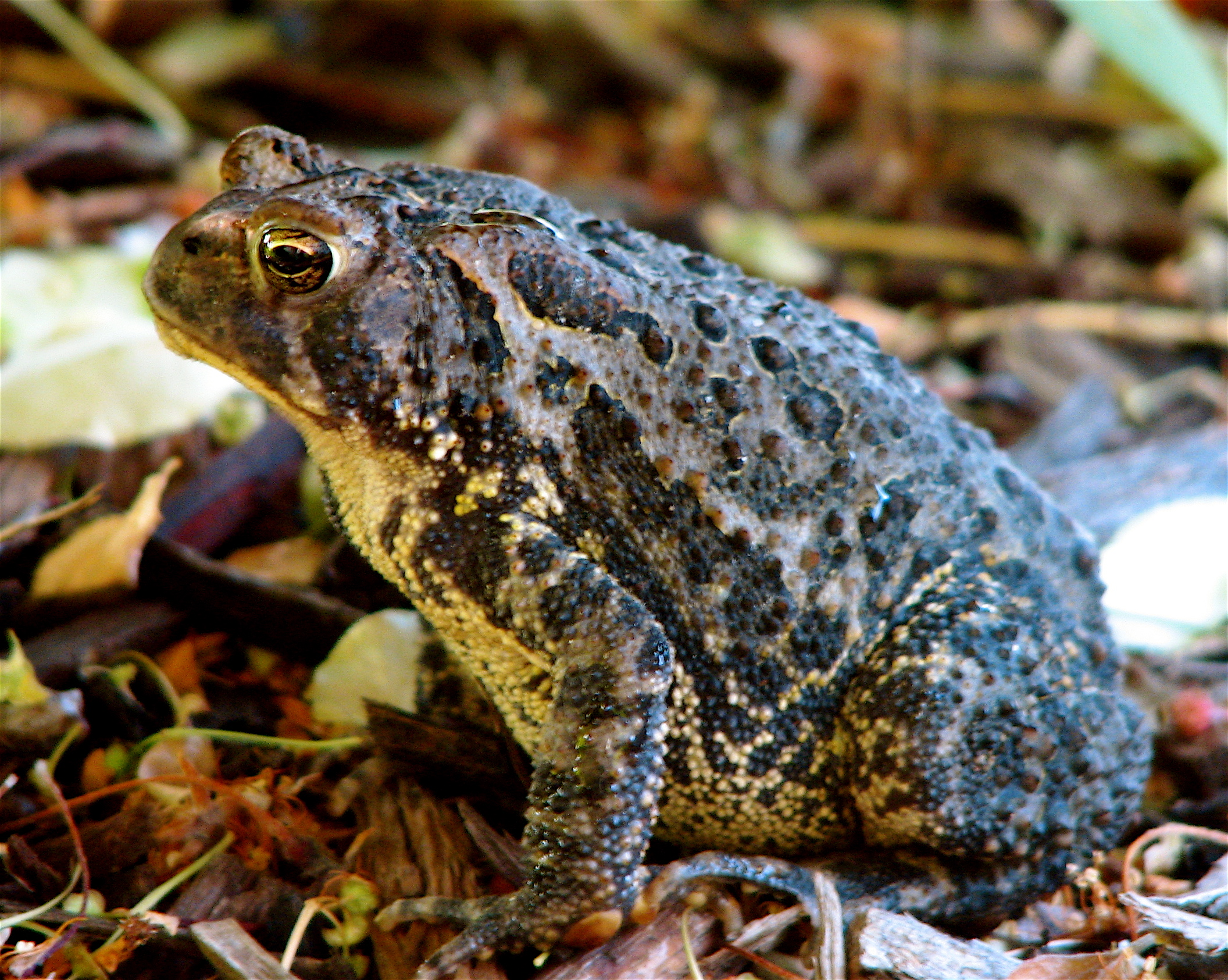
The eastern American toad (Bufo americanus)

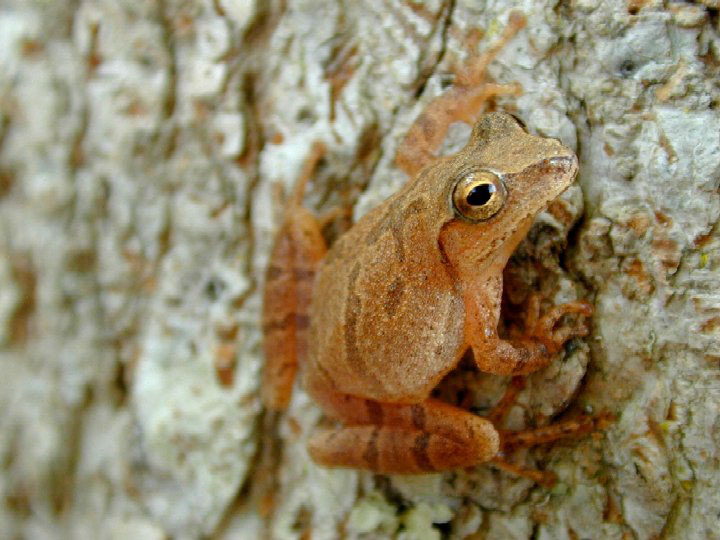
The spring peeper (Pseudacris crucifer)

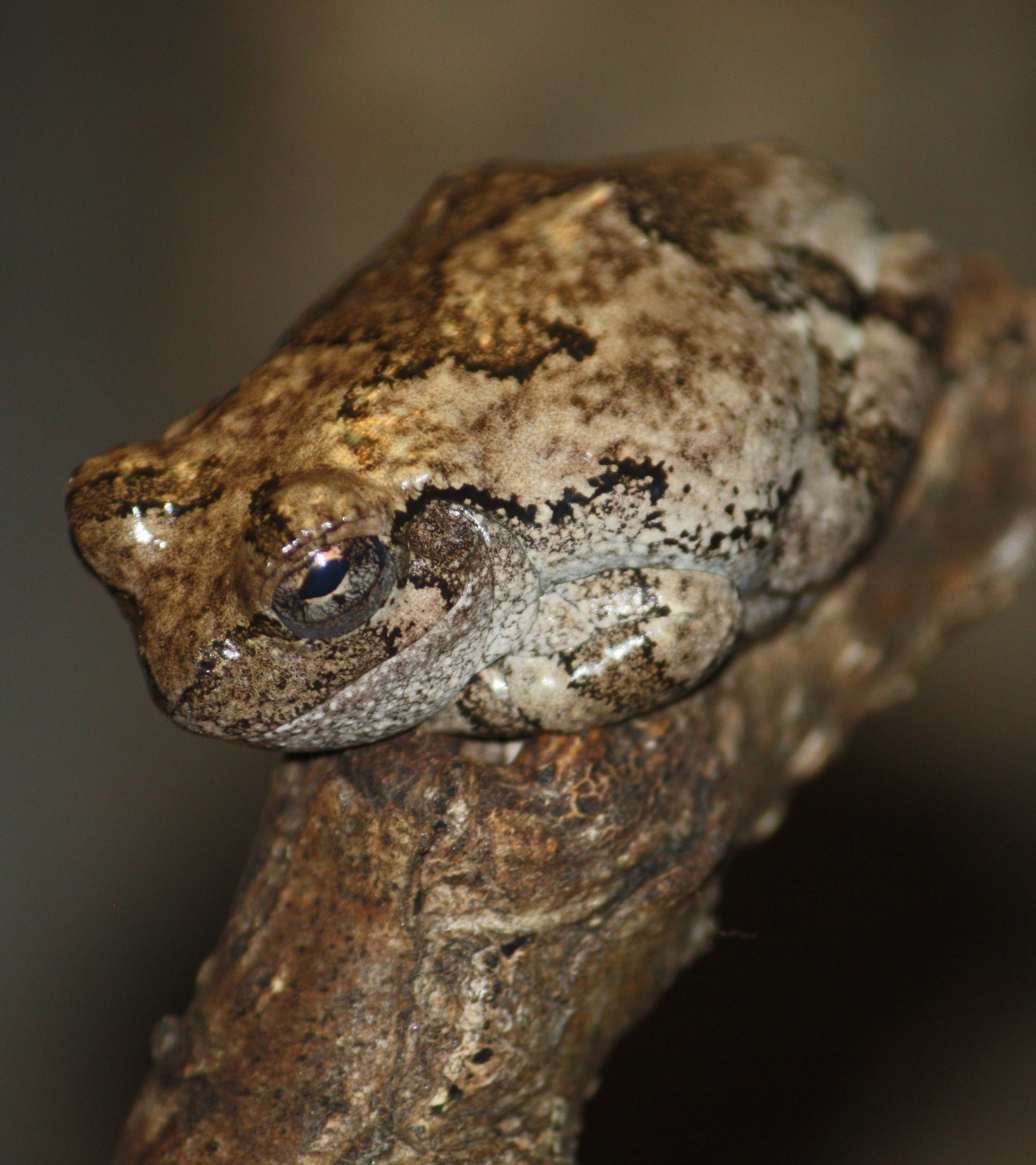
The gray tree frog (Hyla versicolor)

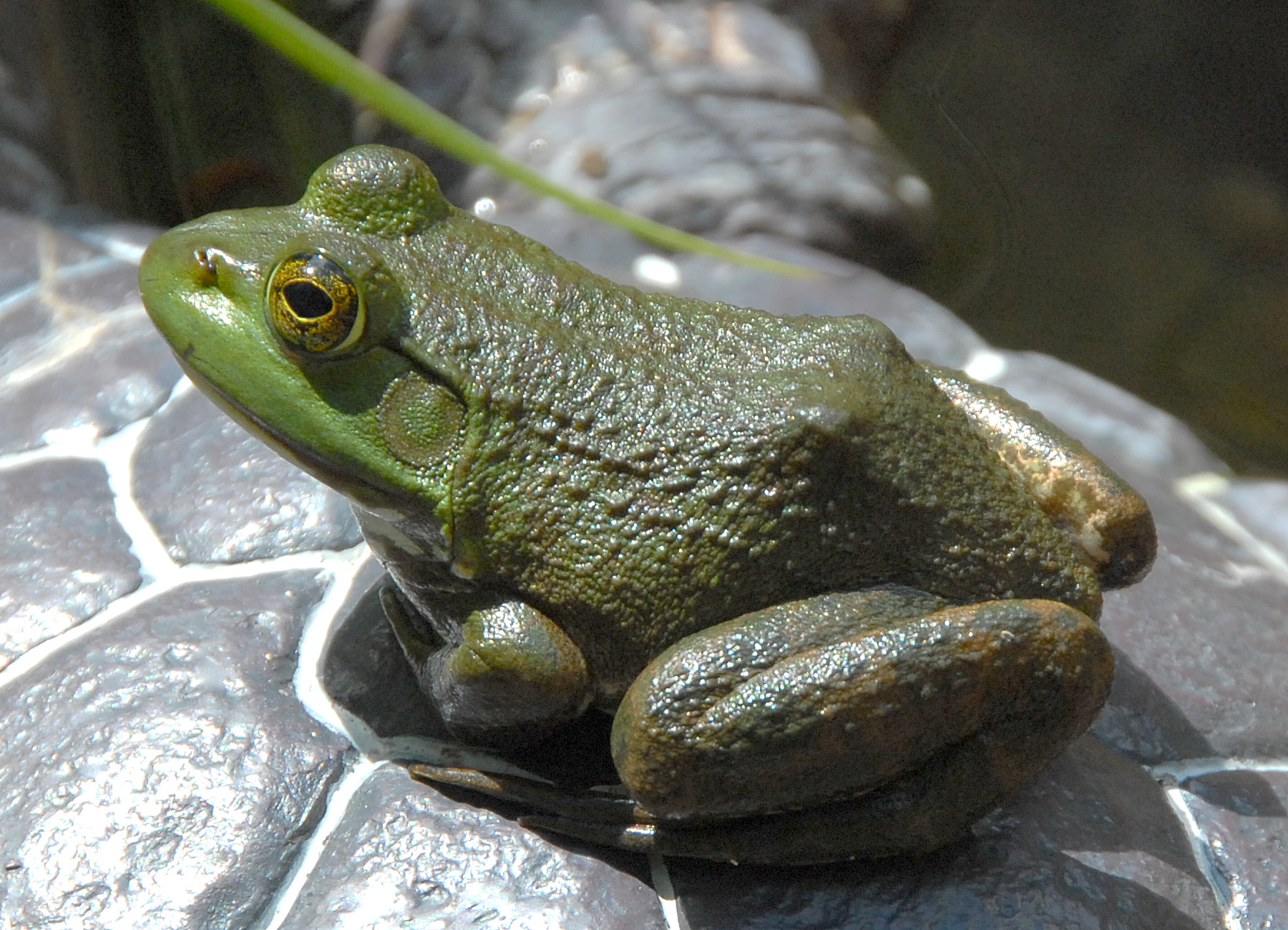
A female American bullfrog (Rana catesbeiana)

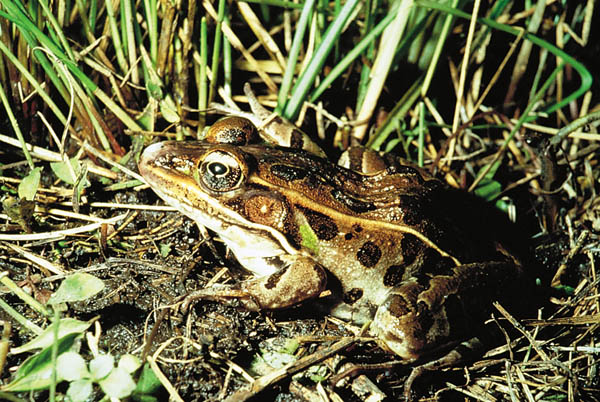
The northern leopard frog (Rana pipiens)

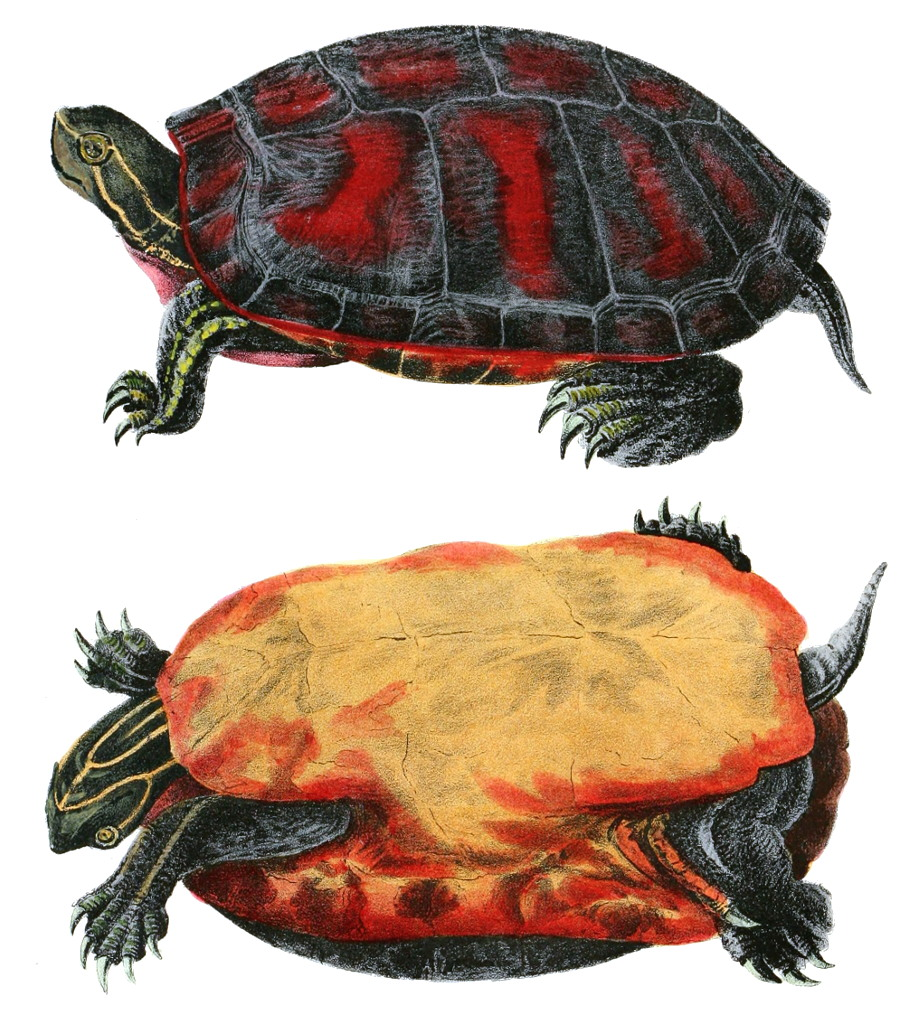
Northern red-bellied cooter (Pseudemys rubriventris)

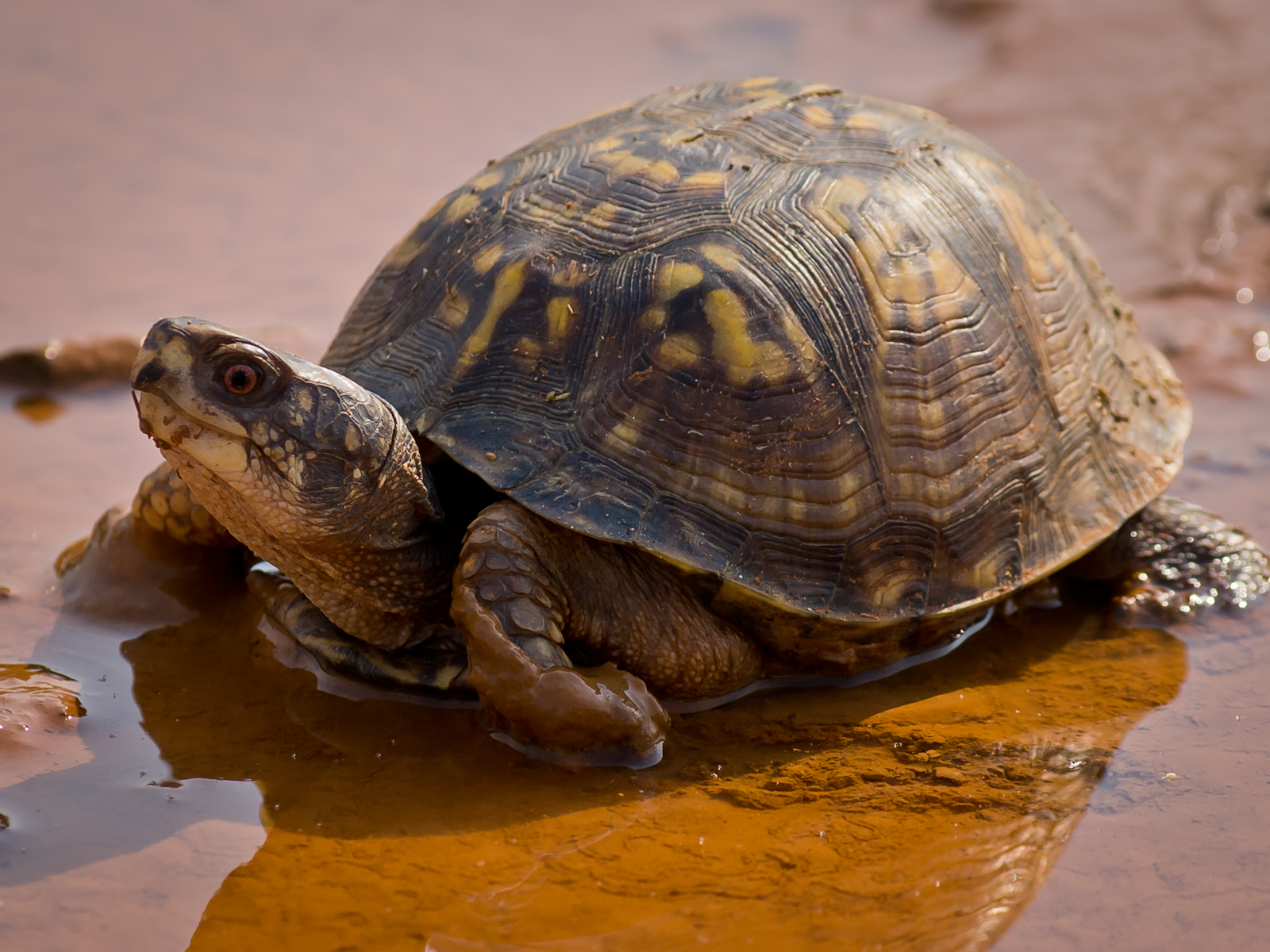
Eastern box turtle (Terrapene carolina)

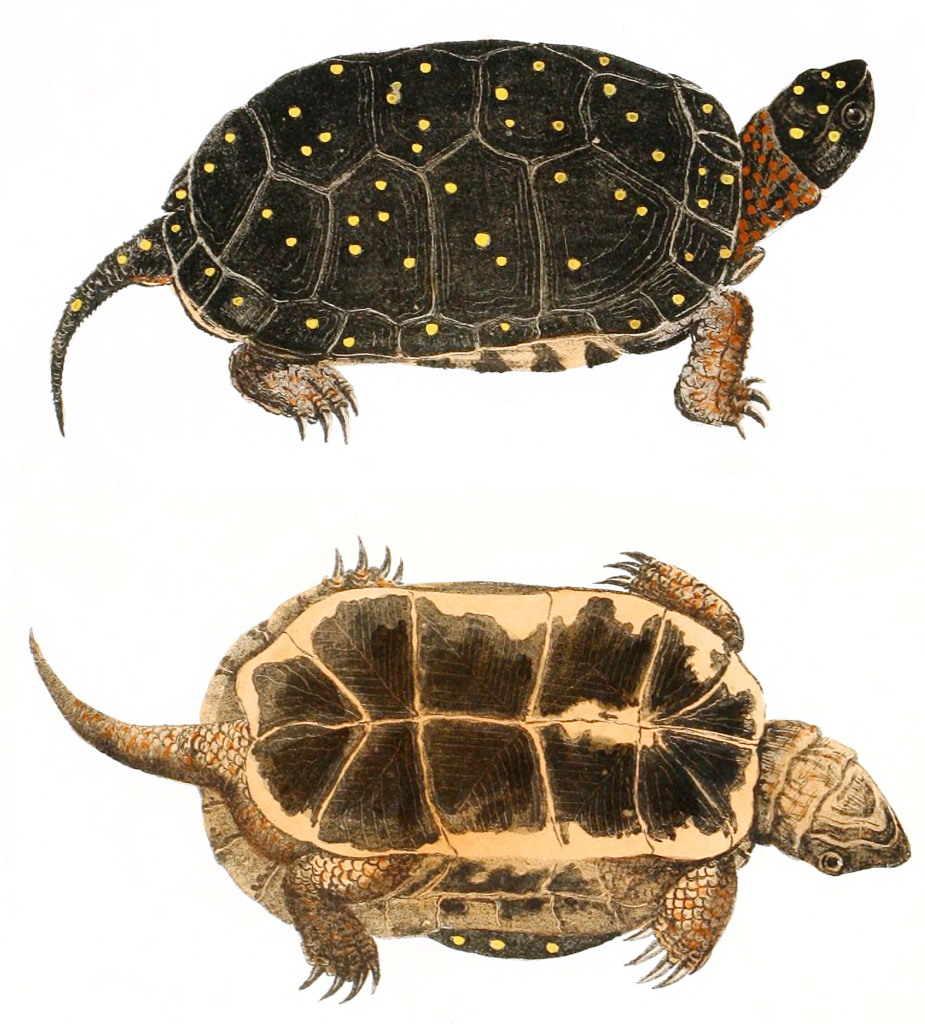
Spotted turtle (Clemmys guttata)

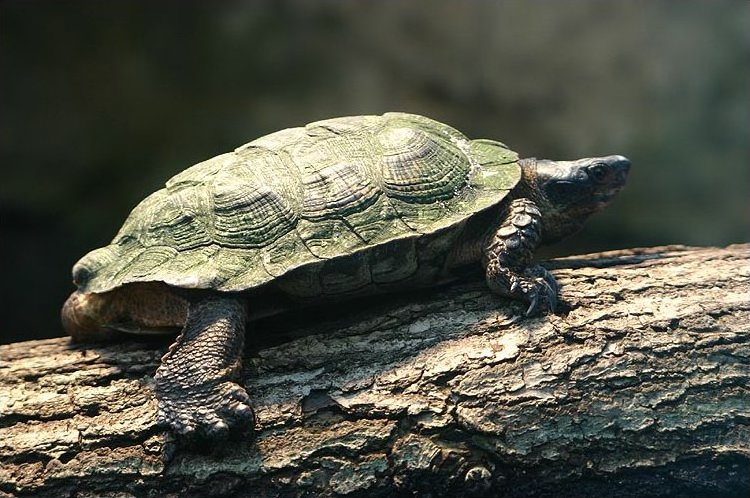
Wood turtle (Glyptemys insculpta)

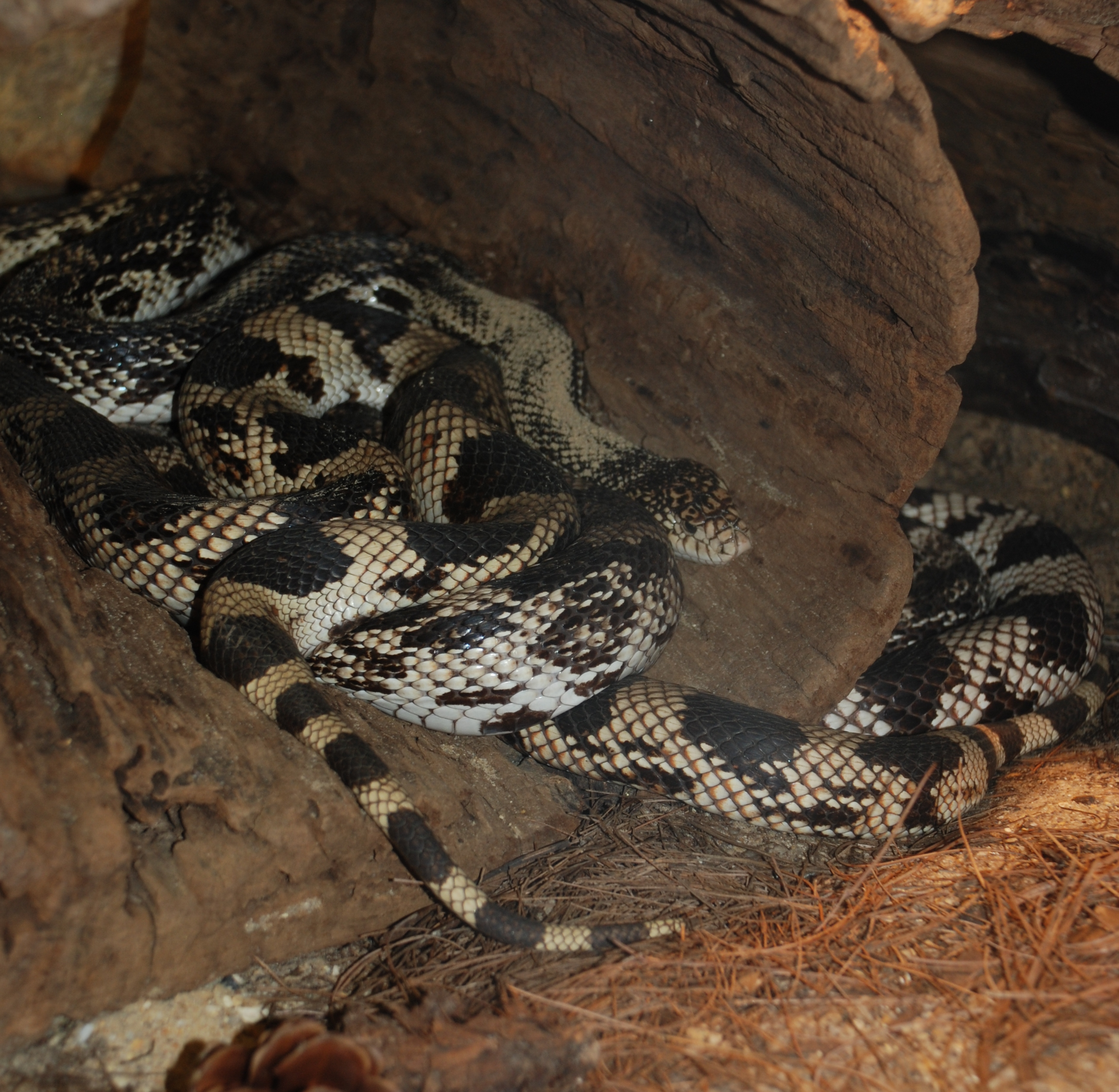
Northern pine snake (P. m. melanoleucus)

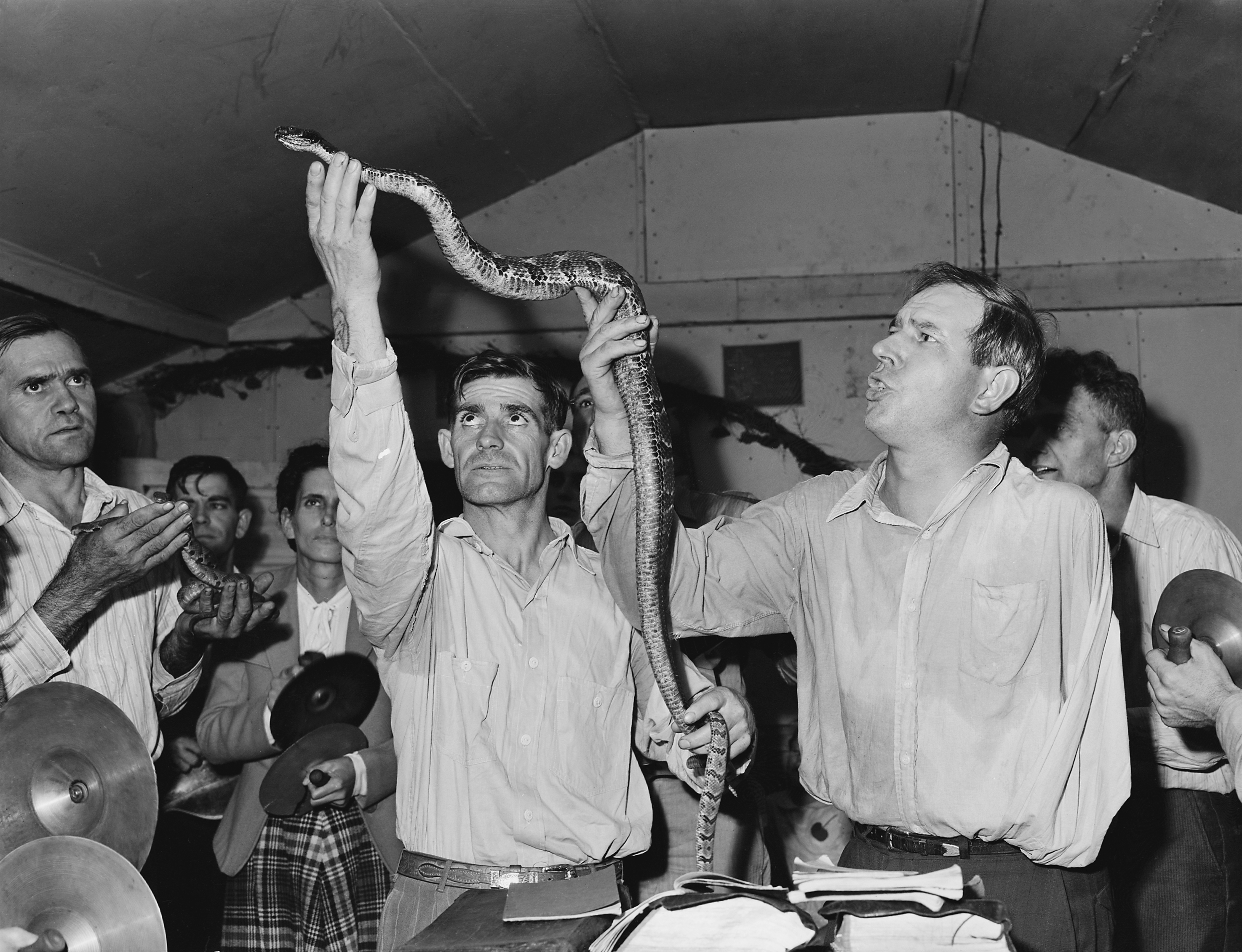
Snake handlers worshipping with a timber rattlesnake (Crotalus horridus)

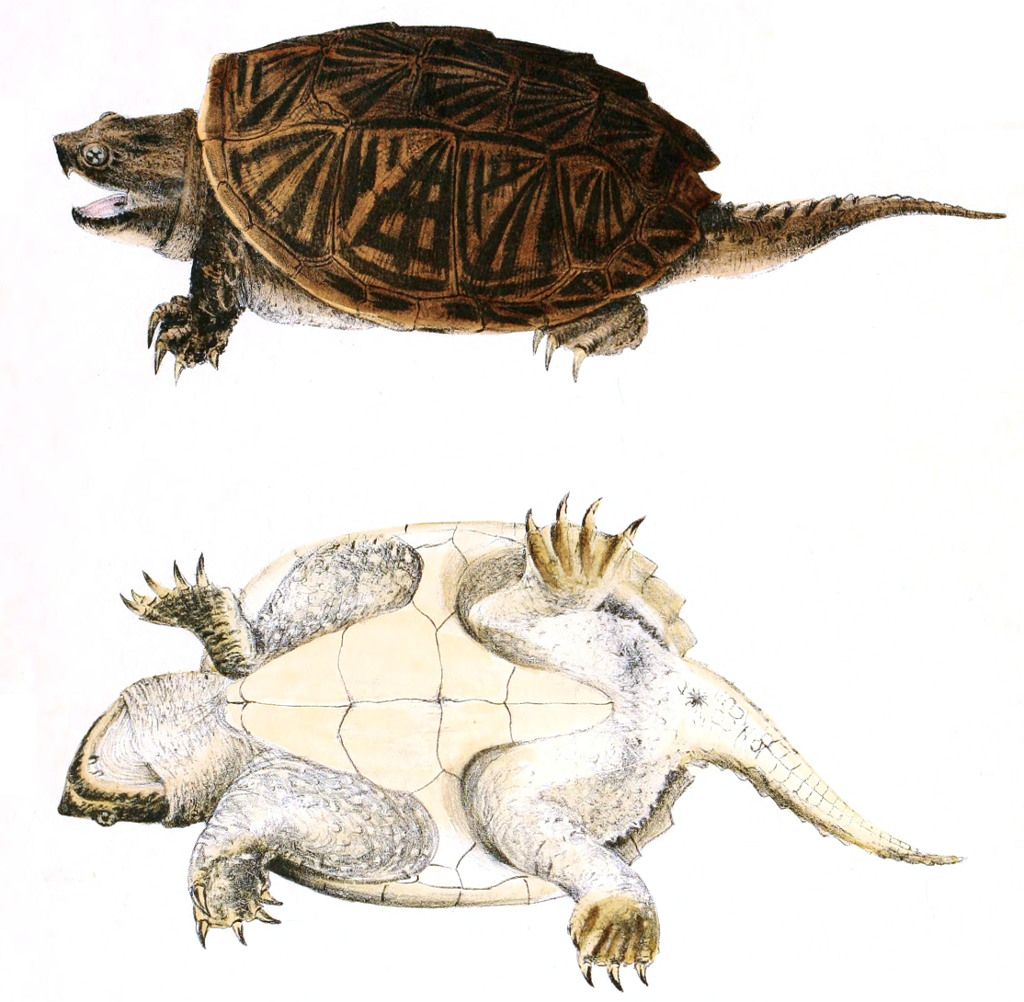
Eastern snapping turtle (Chelydra serpentina)

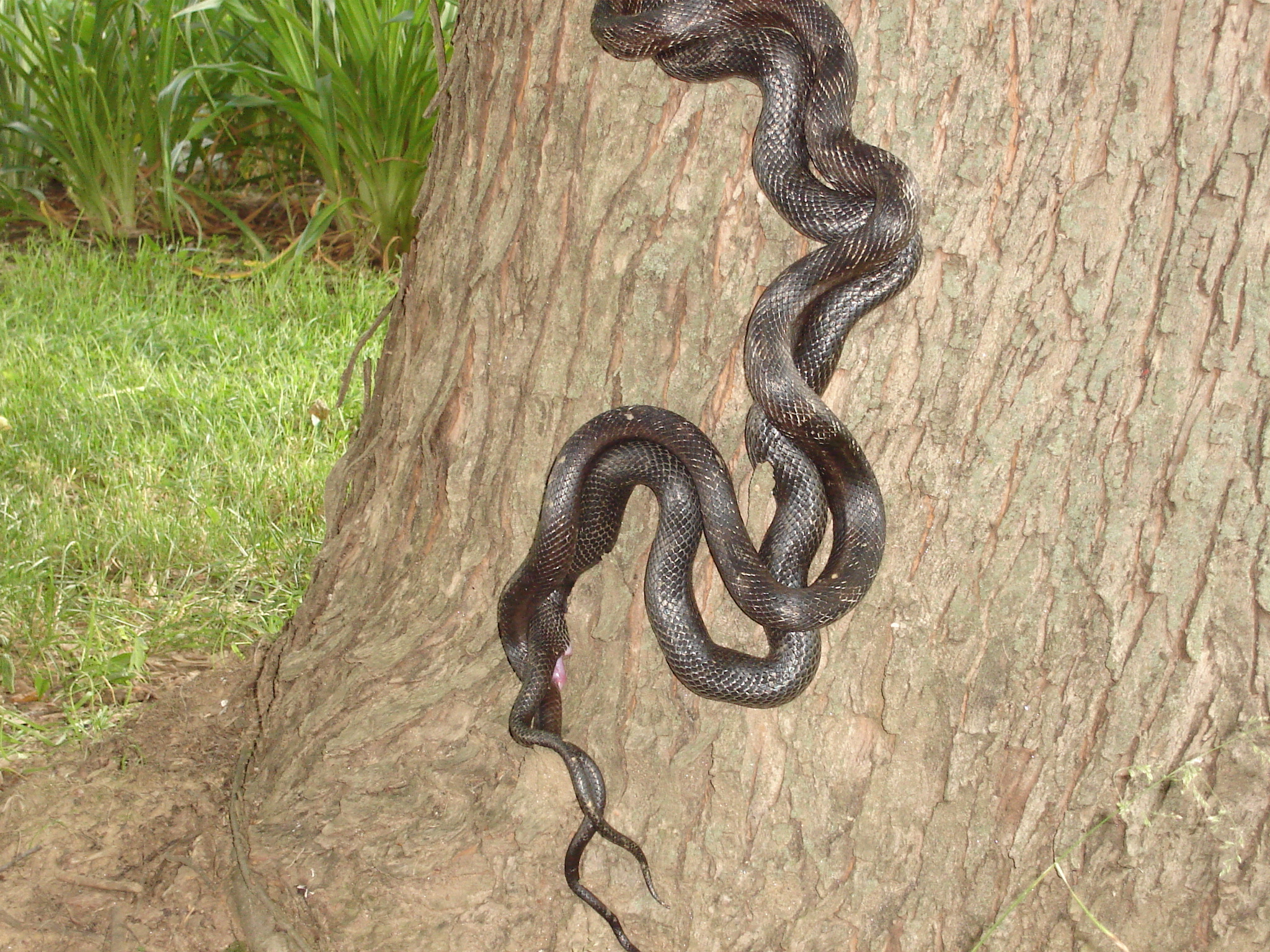
Black rat snakes (Pantherophis obsoletus) mating

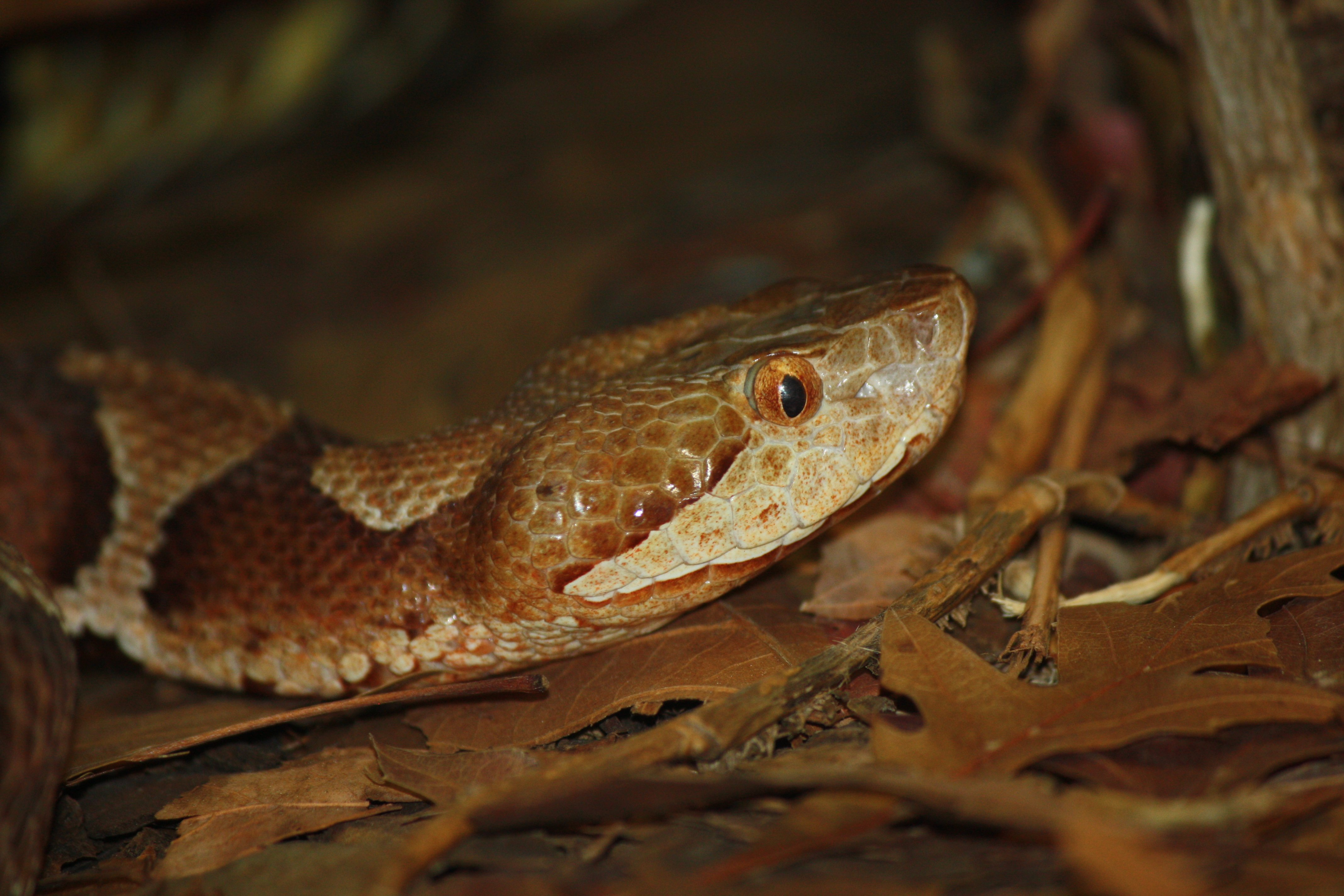
Northern copperhead (A. c. mokasen)

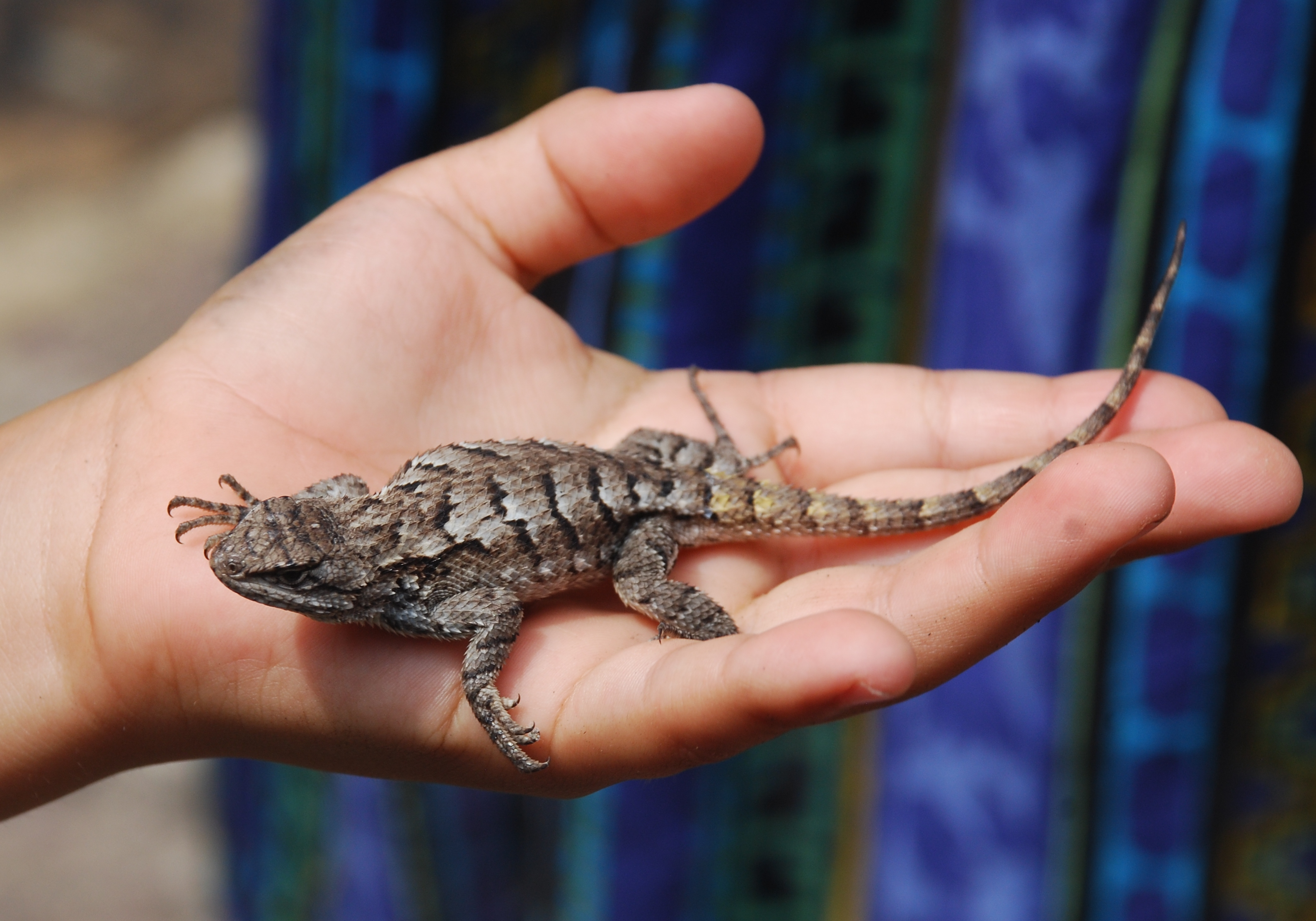
Eastern fence lizard (Sceloporus undulatus)

89 species of amphibians (class Amphibia) and reptiles (class Reptilia) are known to inhabit the state of West Virginia. The ranges of some 34 salamander species, 15 species of frogs and toads, 21 species of snakes, 13 turtle species, and 6 lizard species extend into some portion of the state. Two of these — the Cheat Mountain salamander and West Virginia spring salamander — are endemic to West Virginia. The former species is considered threatened and the latter is considered endangered by federal authorities.

== The taxa ==
The following letters indicate the likelihood of finding each species in West Virginia:

C	Common	Can be commonly seen in suitable habitat within current range.
U	Uncommon	Seldom seen because habitat restricted and/or behavior secretive.
R	Rare	Not often present even in suitable habitat.

In addition, the IUCN classifies three of these species as endangered (EN), two as vulnerable (VU), and six as near-threatened (NT).

=== Order Urodela (salamanders) ===
==== Family Cryptobranchidae (giant salamanders) ====
- Eastern hellbender (Cryptobranchus a. alleganiensis) C, VU

==== Family Proteidae (waterdogs and mudpuppies) ====
- Common mudpuppy (Necturus m. maculosus) C

==== Family Ambystomatidae (mole salamanders) ====
- Jefferson salamander (Ambystoma jeffersonianum) U
- Spotted salamander (Ambystoma maculatum) C
- Marbled salamander (Ambystoma opacum) C
- Small-mouth salamander (Ambystoma texanum) R
- Streamside salamander (Ambystoma barbouri) R, NT

==== Family Salamandridae (true salamanders) ====
- Red-spotted newt (Notophthalmus v. viridescens) C

==== Family Plethodontidae (lungless salamanders) ====
- Northern dusky salamander (Desmognathus fuscus) C
- Allegheny Mountain dusky salamander (Desmognathus ochrophaeus) C
- Seal salamander (Desmognathus monticola) C
- Black mountain salamander (Desmognathus welteri) U
- Blackbelly salamander (Desmognathus quadramaculatus) U
- Red-backed salamander (Plethodon cinereus) C
- Ravine salamander (Plethodon richmondi) C
- Northern ravine salamander (Plethodon electromorphus) C
- Valley and ridge salamander (Plethodon hoffmani) C
- Shenandoah Mountain salamander (Plethodon virginia) U, NT
- Cumberland Plateau salamander (Plethodon kentucki) C
- Cheat Mountain salamander (Plethodon nettingi) R, NT
- Northern slimy salamander (Plethodon glutinosus) C
- White-spotted slimy salamander (Plethodon cylindraceus) C
- Wehrle's salamander (Plethodon wehrlei) C
- Cow Knob salamander (Plethodon punctatus) U, NT
- Four-toed salamander (Hemidactylium scutatum) C
- Northern spring salamander (Gyrinophilus p. porphyriticus) C
- Kentucky spring salamander (Gyrinophilus porphyriticus duryi) C
- West Virginia spring salamander (Gyrinophilus subterraneus) R, EN
- Midland mud salamander (Pseudotriton montanus diastictus) U
- Northern red salamander (Pseudotriton r. ruber) C
- Green salamander (Aneides aeneus) U, NT
- Southern two-lined salamander (Eurycea cirrigera) C, LC
- Northern two-lined salamander (Eurycea bislineata) C, LC
- Long-tailed salamander (Eurycea l. longicauda) C
- Spotted-tail salamander (Eurycea lucifuga) U, LC

=== Order Anura (frogs) ===
==== Family Scaphiopodidae (American spadefoot toads) ====
- Eastern spadefoot (Scaphiopus holbrookii) R

==== Family Bufonidae (true toads) ====
- Eastern American toad (Anaxyrus a. americanus) C
- Fowler's toad (Anaxyrus fowleri) C

==== Family Hylidae (tree frogs and allies) ====
- Eastern cricket frog (Acris c. crepitans) U
- Blanchard's cricket frog (Acris blanchardi) R
- Gray treefrog (Dryophytes versicolor) C
- Cope's gray treefrog (Dryophytes chrysoscelis) C
- Appalachian mountain chorus frog (Pseudacris brachyphona) C
- Upland chorus frog (Pseudacris feriarum) U
- Northern spring peeper (Pseudacris c. crucifer) C

==== Family Ranidae (true frogs) ====
- American bullfrog (Lithobates catesbeianus) C
- Northern green frog (Lithobates clamitans melanota) C
- Wood frog (Lithobates sylvaticus) C
- Northern leopard frog (Lithobates pipiens) U
- Pickerel frog (Lithobates palustris) C

=== Order Testudines (turtles) ===
==== Family Chelydridae (snapping turtles) ====
- Common snapping turtle (Chelydra s. serpentina) C

==== Family Emydidae (pond turtles) ====
- Spotted turtle (Clemmys guttata) R, EN
- Wood turtle (Glyptemys insculpta) U, EN
- Eastern box turtle (Terrapene c. carolina) C, VU
- Northern map turtle (Graptemys geographica) U
- Ouachita map turtle (Graptemys o. ouachitensis) R
- Eastern painted turtle (Chrysemys p. picta) C
- Midland painted turtle (Chrysemys picta marginata) C
- Red-eared slider (Trachemys scripta elegans) C
- Eastern river cooter (Pseudemys c. concinna) U
- Northern red-bellied cooter (Pseudemys rubriventris) U, NT

==== Family Kinosternidae (mud turtles and musk turtles) ====
- Common musk turtle (Sternotherus odoratus) C

==== Family Trionychidae (softshells) ====
- Northern spiny softshell turtle (Apalone s. spinifera) C
- Smooth softshell turtle (Apalone m. mutica) R

=== Order Squamata (scaled reptiles) ===
==== Family Phrynosomatidae (spiny lizards) ====
- Eastern fence lizard (Sceloporus undulatus) C

==== Family Teiidae (whiptails) ====
- Eastern six-lined racerunner (Aspidoscelis s. sexlineata) U

==== Family Scincidae (skinks) ====
- Little brown skink (Scincella lateralis) U
- Five-lined skink (Plestiodon fasciatus) C
- Broad-headed skink (Plestiodon laticeps) U
- Northern coal skink (Plestiodon a. anthracinus) U

==== Family Colubridae (colubrid snakes) ====
- Queen snake (Regina septemvittata) C
- Northern watersnake (Nerodia s. sipedon) C
- DeKay's brown snake (Storeria d. dekayi) U
- Northern redbelly snake (Storeria o. occipitomaculata) C
- Eastern ribbon snake (Thamnophis s. saurita) U
- Eastern garter snake (Thamnophis s. sirtalis) C
- Smooth earth snake (Virginia valeriae) U
- Eastern hognose snake (Heterodon platirhinos) U
- Eastern worm snake (Carphophis a. amoenus) C
- Northern ringneck snake (Diadophis punctatus edwardsii) C
- Northern black racer (Coluber c. constrictor) C
- Northern rough green snake (Opheodrys a. aestivus) U
- Smooth green snake (Opheodrys vernalis) C
- Corn snake (Pantherophis guttatus) R
- Central ratsnake (Pantherophis alleghaniensis) C
- Northern pine snake (Pituophis m. melanoleucus) R
- Eastern kingsnake (Lampropeltis g. getula) R
- Black kingsnake (Lampropeltis nigra) C
- Eastern milk snake (Lampropeltis t. triangulum) C

==== Family Viperidae (vipers) ====
- Northern copperhead (Agkistrodon contortrix mokasen) C
- Timber rattlesnake (Crotalus horridus) C

== See also ==
- Lists of amphibians by region
- Lists of reptiles by region
- West Virginia State Wildlife Center, a small zoo featuring native West Virginia animals
- Fauna of West Virginia
- List of West Virginia wildlife management areas
