= List of mammals of West Virginia =

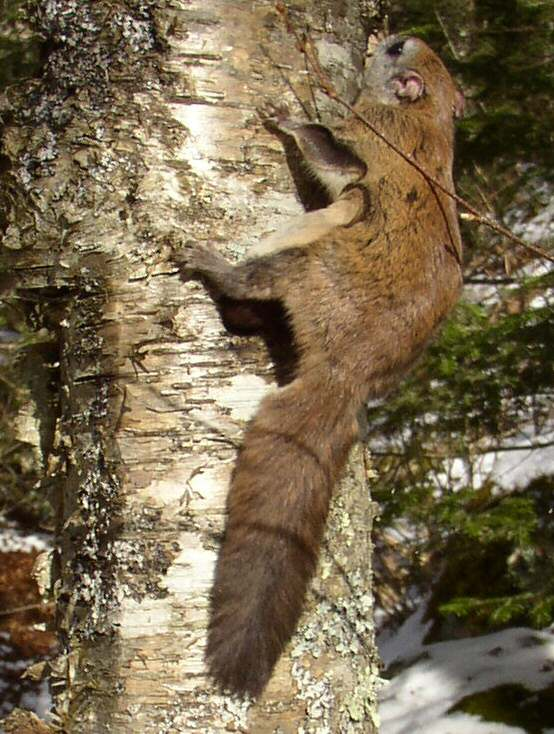
The northern flying squirrel (Glaucomys sabrinus)

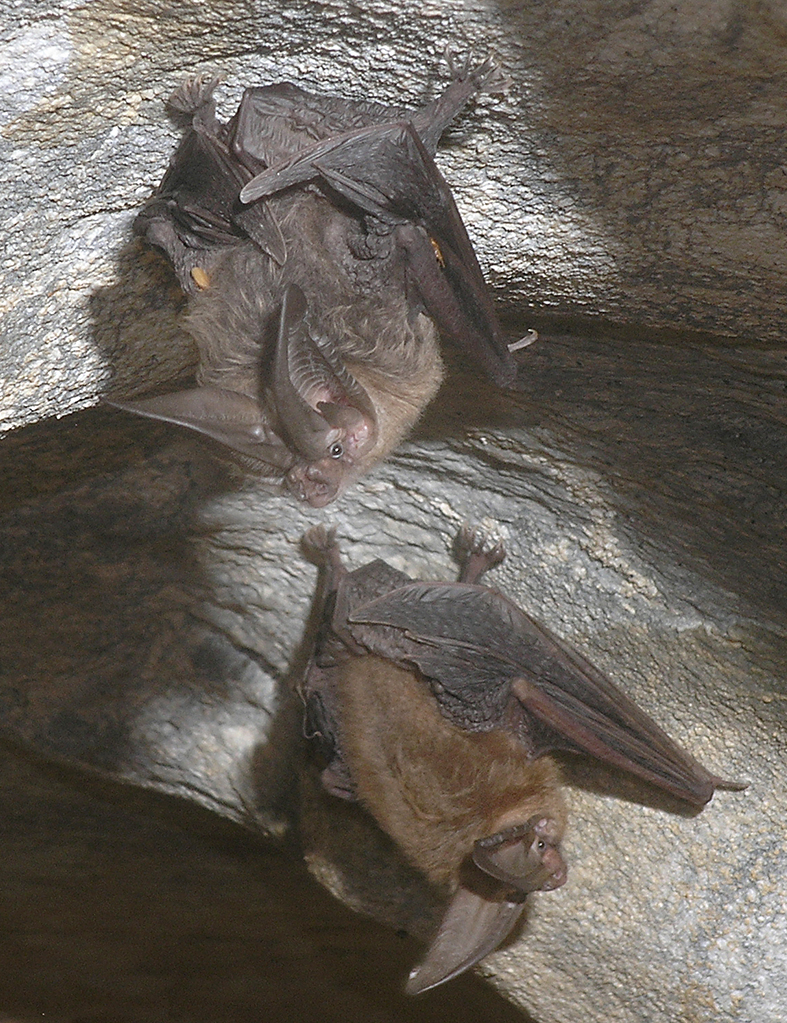
The Virginia big-eared bat, also known as Townsend's big-eared bat (Corynorhinus townsendii)

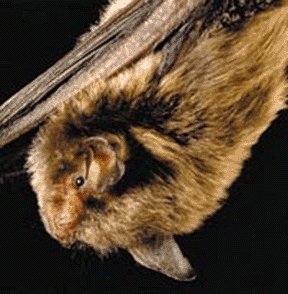
The Indiana bat (Myotis sodalis)

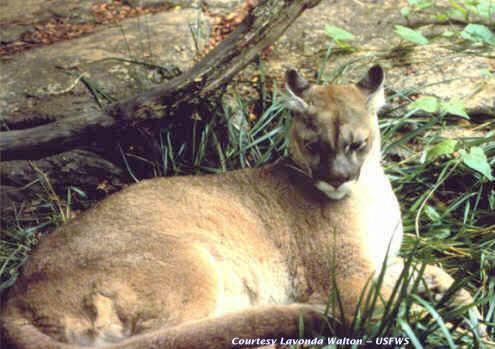
The eastern cougar (Puma concolor couguar) was deemed extinct by the USF&WS in 2011.

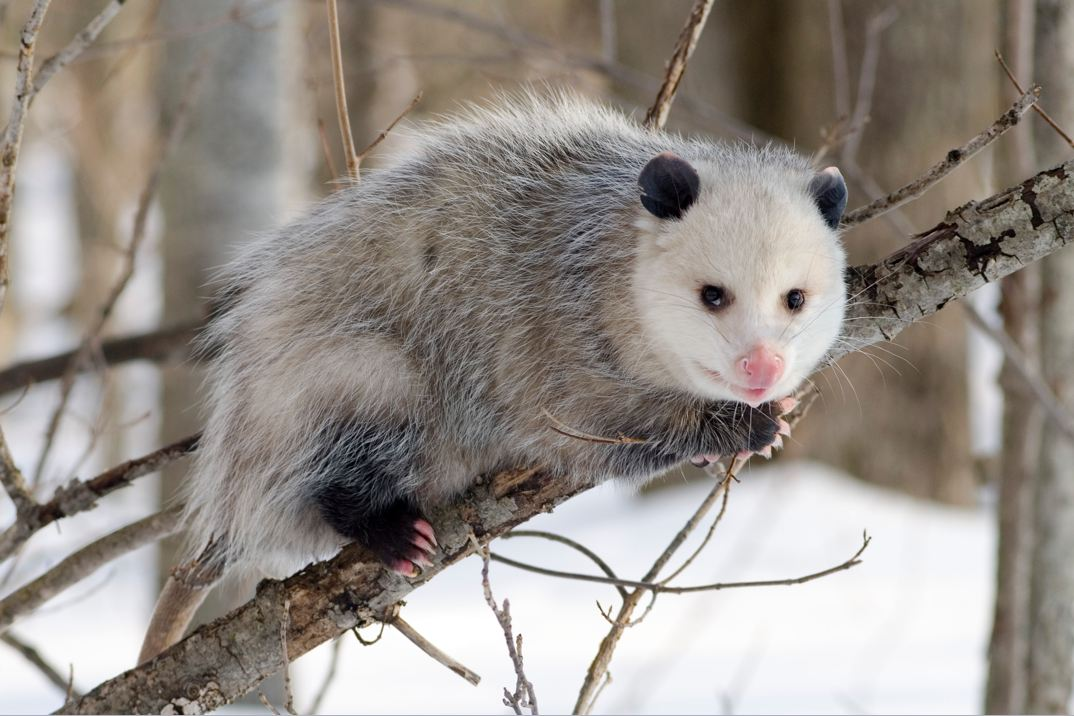
The Virginia opossum (Didelphis virginiana)

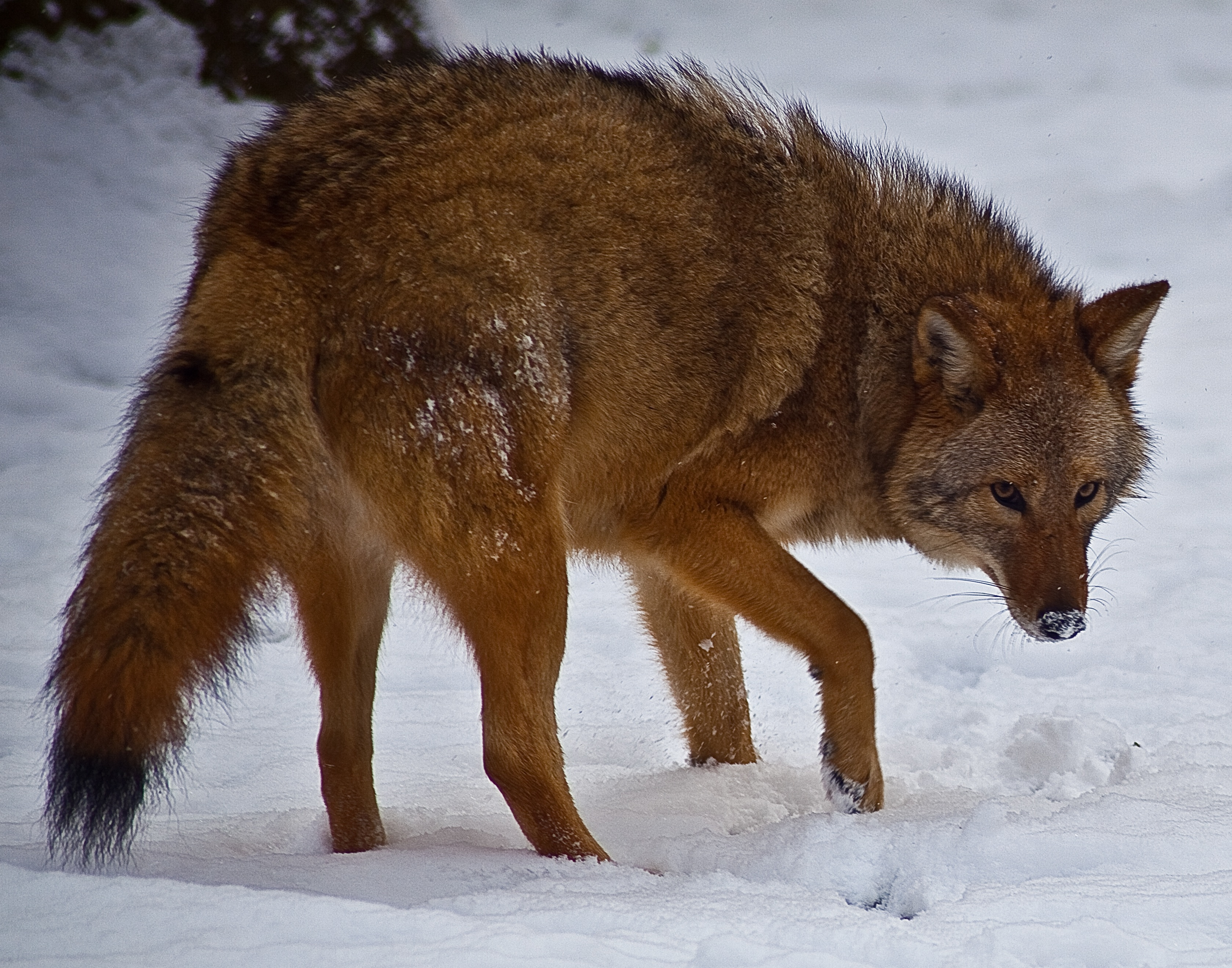
The eastern coyote (Canis latrans var.) is expanding its range in West Virginia.

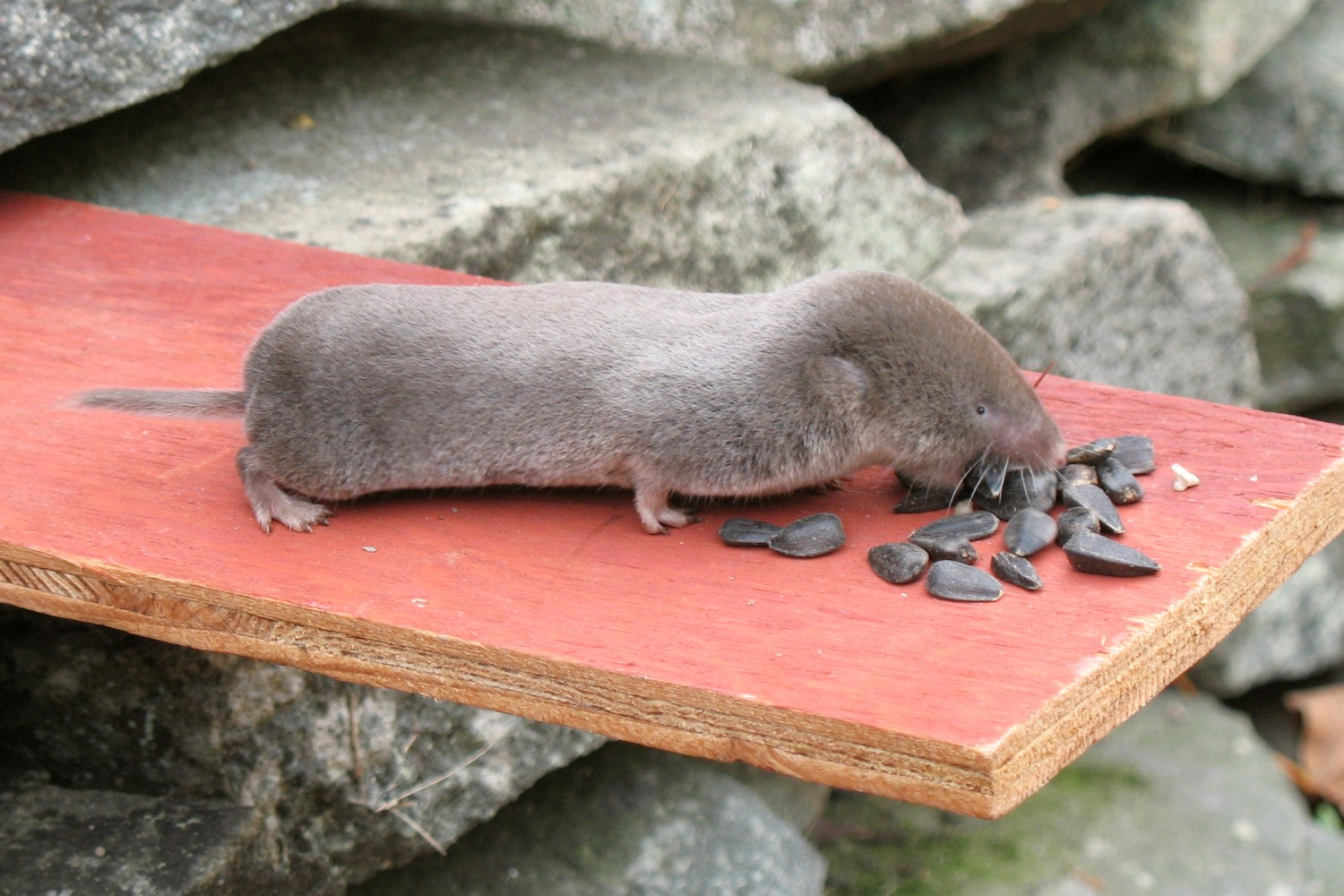
The American, or northern, short-tailed shrew (Blarina brevicauda)

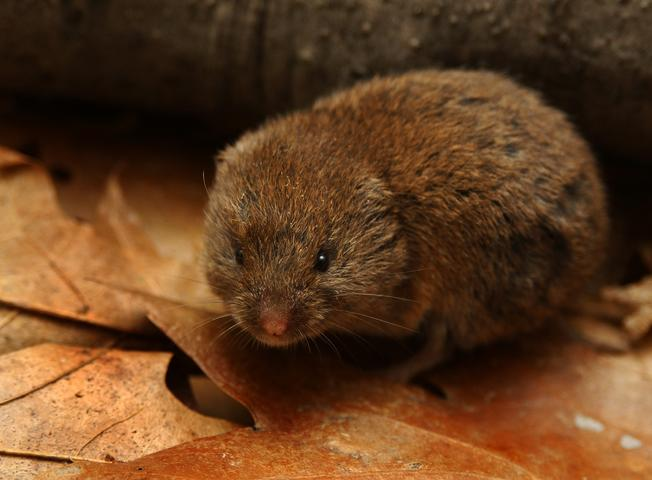
The woodland vole (Microtus pinetorum)

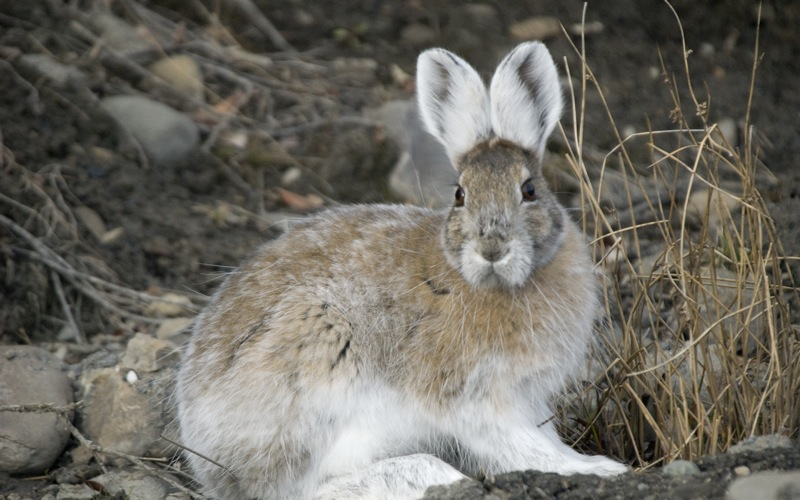
The snowshoe hare (Lepus americanus), typical of Canada, reaches its southernmost distribution in West Virginia.

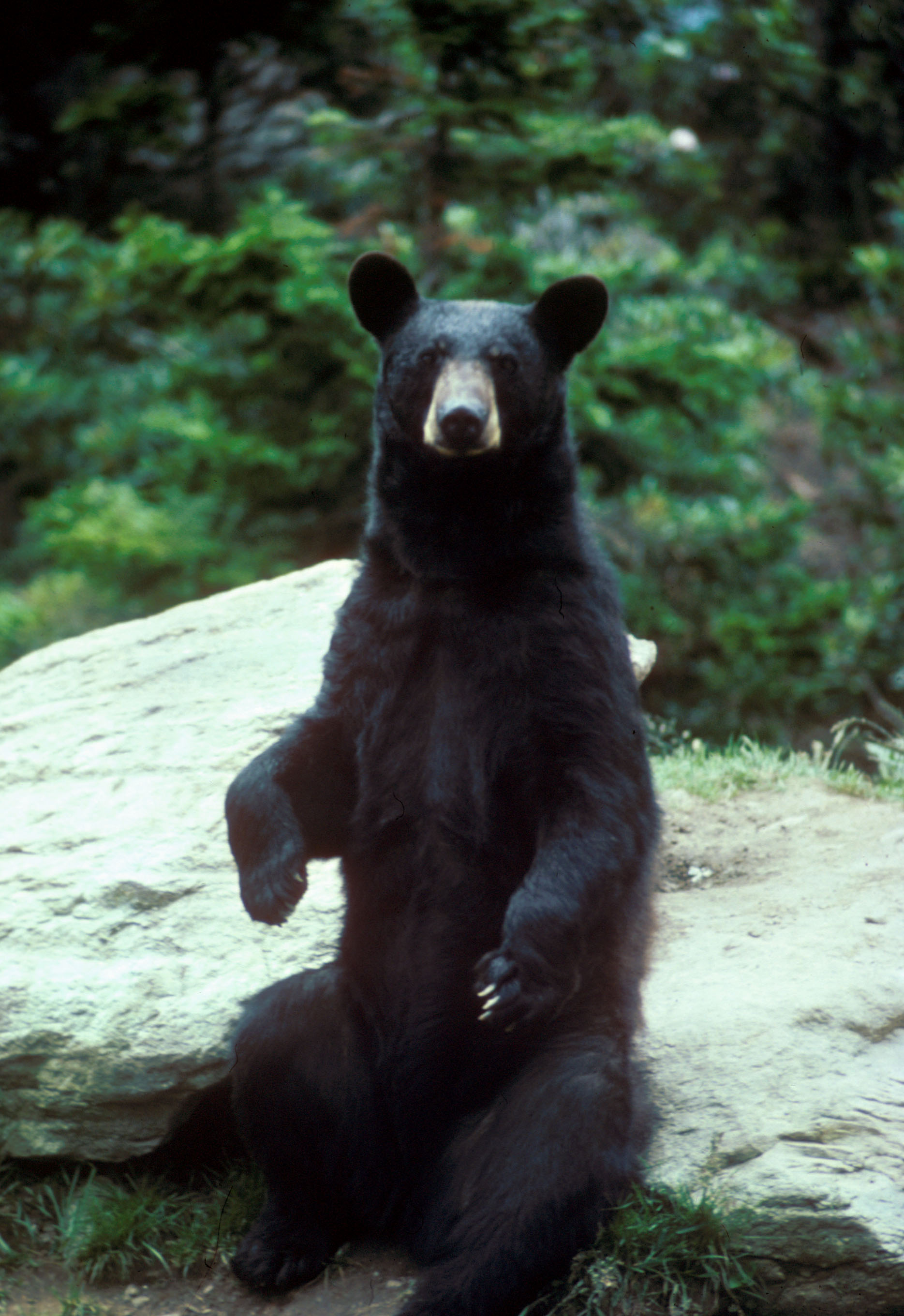
The American black bear (Ursus americanus) has been the West Virginia state animal since 1973

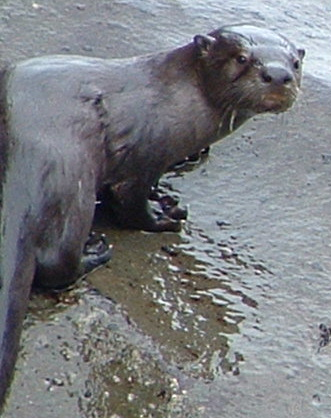
The river otter (Lontra canadensis) has been reestablished in West Virginia.

The state of West Virginia is home to 72 wild mammal species. Four – the Virginia big-eared bat, the Indiana bat, the West Virginia northern flying squirrel and the extinct eastern cougar – are federally listed as endangered. Several additional species are rare in the state and warrant close monitoring.

Some mammals which have thrived despite human disturbance include the opossum, which is more abundant and more widely distributed due to human activities. Also doing well are mammals that prefer farm and early successional habitats. The coyote is expanding its range eastward in the United States and now occurs throughout the state.

Many examples of West Virginia's present and former megafauna are on display at the West Virginia State Wildlife Center, a small zoo featuring native animals.

== List ==
The following letters indicate the likelihood of finding each animal in West Virginia:

C	Common	Can be commonly seen in suitable habitat within current range.
U	Uncommon	Seldom seen because habitat restricted and/or behavior secretive.
R	Rare	Not often present even in suitable habitat.
RI	Reintroduced	Reintroduced after being extirpated.
I	Introduced	Not native to West Virginia, introduced by humans
X	Extirpated	No longer present in West Virginia.

In addition, the International Union for Conservation of Nature classifies one of these species as critically endangered (CR), two as endangered (EN), three as vulnerable (VU), and five as near-threatened (NT).

=== Order Didelphimorphia (opossums) ===
Family Didelphidae (opossums)

- Virginia opossum (Didelphis virginiana) C

=== Order Eulipotyphla (shrews, moles and relatives) ===
Family Soricidae (shrews)

- Northern short-tailed shrew (Blarina brevicauda) C
- North American least shrew (Cryptotis parva) R
- Cinereus shrew (Sorex cinereus) C
- Long-tailed shrew (Sorex dispar) U
- Smoky shrew (Sorex fumeus) U
- American pygmy shrew (Sorex hoyi) U
- Southeastern shrew (Sorex longirostris) U
- American water shrew (Sorex palustris) R

Family Talpidae (moles)

- Star-nosed mole (Condylura cristata) U
- Hairy-tailed mole (Parascalops breweri) C
- Eastern mole (Scalopus aquaticus) U

=== Order Chiroptera (bats) ===
Family Vespertilionidae (vesper bats)

- Rafinesque's big-eared bat (Corynorhinus rafinesquii) R
- Townsend's big-eared bat (Corynorhinus townsendii)
  - Virginia big-eared bat (C. t. virginianus) R, EN
- Big brown bat (Eptesicus fuscus) C
- Silver-haired bat (Lasionycteris noctivagans) U
- Eastern red bat (Lasiurus borealis) C
- Hoary bat (Lasiurus cinereus) U
- Gray bat (Myotis grisescens) R, VU
- Eastern small-footed myotis (Myotis leibii) R, EN
- Little brown bat (Myotis lucifugus) C, EN
- Northern long-eared bat (Myotis septentrionalis) U, NT
- Indiana bat (Myotis sodalis) R, NT
- Evening bat (Nycticeius humeralis) R
- Tricolored bat (Perimyotis subflavus) C, VU

=== Order Rodentia (rodents) ===
Family Sciuridae (squirrels)

- Northern flying squirrel (Glaucomys sabrinus) R
  - Virginia northern flying squirrel (G. s. fuscus) R
- Southern flying squirrel (Glaucomys volans) C
- Groundhog (Marmota monax) C
- Eastern gray squirrel (Sciurus carolinensis) C
- Fox squirrel (Sciurus niger) C
- Eastern chipmunk (Tamias striatus) C
- American red squirrel (Tamiasciurus hudsonicus) C

Family Castoridae (beavers)

- North American beaver (Castor canadensis) C, RI

Family Dipodidae (jumping mice)

- Woodland jumping mouse (Napaeozapus insignis) C
- Meadow jumping mouse (Zapus hudsonius) U

Family Cricetidae (New World mice and rats)

- Eastern meadow vole (Microtus pennsylvanicus) C
- Rock vole (Microtus chrotorrhinus) U
- Prairie vole (Microtus ochrogaster) R
- Woodland vole (Microtus pinetorum) C
- Southern red-backed vole (Clethrionomys gapperi) C
- Allegheny woodrat (Neotoma magister) U, NT
- Golden mouse (Ochrotomys nuttalli) U
- Muskrat (Ondatra zibethicus) C
- Eastern deer mouse (Peromyscus maniculatus) C
- White-footed mouse (Peromyscus leucopus) C
- Eastern harvest mouse (Reithrodontomys humulis) R
- Southern bog lemming (Synaptomys cooperi) U

Family Muridae (Old World mice and rats)

- House mouse (Mus musculus) I
- Brown rat (Rattus norvegicus) I
- Black rat (Rattus rattus) I

Family Erethizontidae (New World porcupines)

- North American porcupine (Erethizon dorsatum) R

=== Order Lagomorpha (rabbits, hares and pikas) ===
Family Leporidae (rabbits and hares)

- Snowshoe hare (Lepus americanus) U
- Appalachian cottontail (Sylvilagus obscurus) U, NT
- Eastern cottontail (Sylvilagus floridanus) C

=== Order Carnivora (carnivorans) ===
Family Canidae (dogs, wolves and foxes)

- Coyote, (Canis latrans) C
  - Eastern coyote (C. l. ssp.) C
- Eastern wolf (Canis lycaon) X
- Red wolf (Canis rufus) X, CR
- Gray fox (Urocyon cinereoargenteus) C
- Red fox (Vulpes vulpes) C

Family Ursidae (bears)

- American black bear (Ursus americanus) U

Family Procyonidae (raccoons and relatives)

- Raccoon (Procyon lotor) C

Family Mustelidae (otters, weasels and relatives)

- North American river otter (Lontra canadensis) RI
- Least weasel (Mustela nivalis) U
- American ermine (Mustela richardsonii) U
- Long-tailed weasel (Neogale frenata) U
- American mink (Neogale vison) U
- Fisher (Pekania pennanti) RI

Family Mephitidae (skunks)

- Striped skunk (Mephitis mephitis) C
- Eastern spotted skunk (Spilogale putorius) U, VU

Family Felidae (cats)

- Bobcat (Lynx rufus) U
- Cougar, (Puma concolor) X
  - Eastern cougar (P. c. couguar) EX

=== Order Artiodactyla (even-toed ungulates) ===
Family Suidae (pigs)

- Wild boar (Sus scrofa) I

Family Cervidae (deer)

- White-tailed deer (Odocoileus virginianus) RI
- Elk, (Cervus canadensis) RI
  - Eastern elk (C. c. canadensis) EX
  - Rocky Mountain elk (C. c. nelsoni) I

Family Bovidae (cattle, goats and relatives)

- American bison (Bison bison) X, NT
  - Plains bison (B. b. bison) X

== Introduced species ==
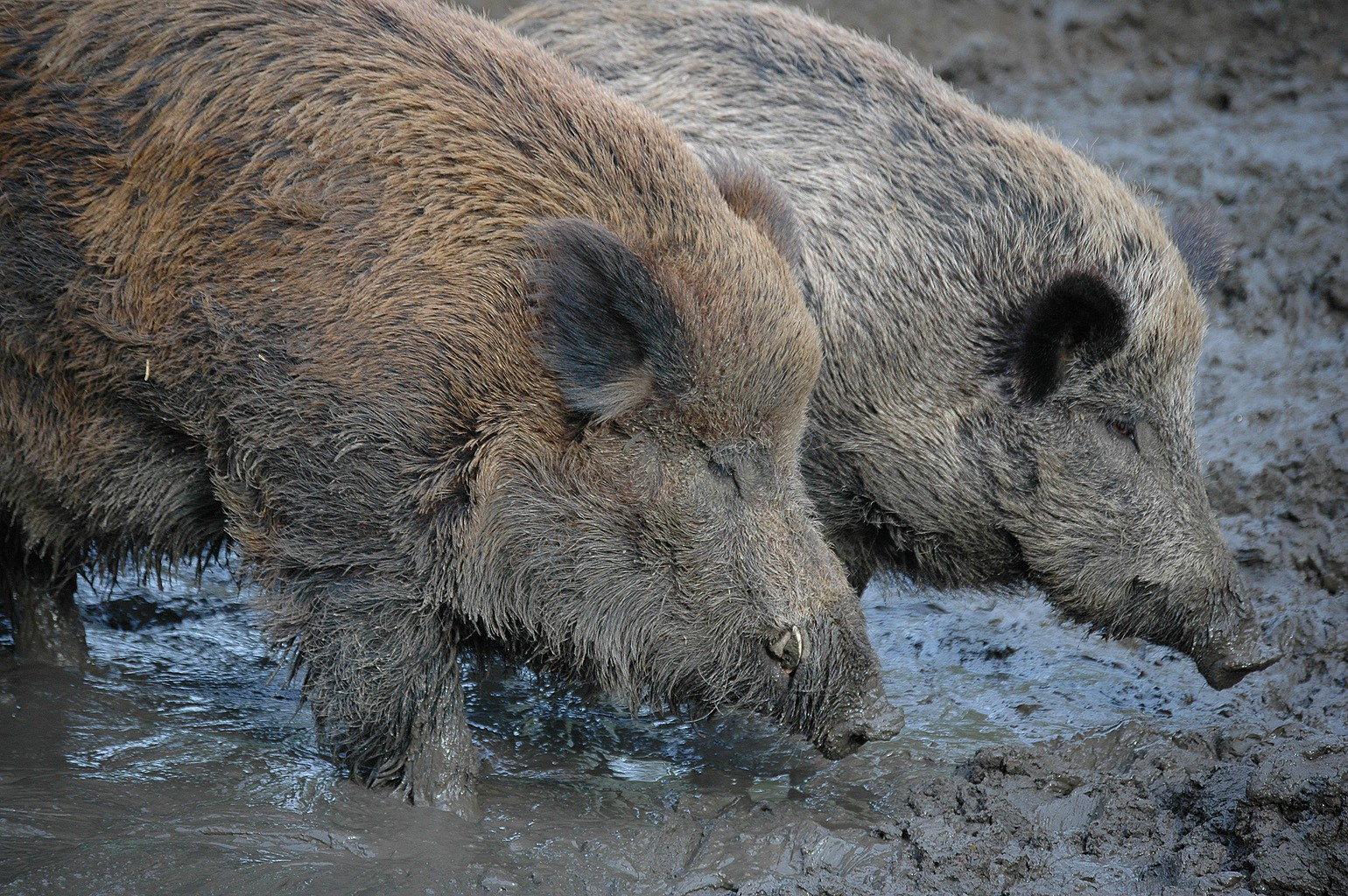
Wild boar: This European species was introduced to southern West Virginia a generation or two ago.

During colonial times, the black rat, brown rat and house mouse all came to North America, including the future West Virginia, with European settlers and traders.

=== Wild boar ===
European wild boar (Sus scrofa scrofa) were introduced into south-eastern West Virginia in 1971 as an additional large game animal for hunting. Populations are located in the counties of Boone, Logan, Raleigh and Wyoming. Since the late 1990s the population of wild boar has been decreasing, primarily due to a combination of habitat loss and competition from the expanding populations of native black bears and whitetail deer.

== Recent extirpations ==
Eastern timber wolf
The eastern timber wolf (Canis lycaon), roamed throughout the state in pre-settlement days. Bounties were paid on their "scalps" in West Virginia through the late 1890s with the last recorded one being killed by Stofer Hamrick in Randolph County in January 1900.

Red wolf
Once native to all of West Virginia, the red wolf (Canis rufus) was extirpated from the state not too long after its relative, the eastern wolf.

North American cougar
The last officially accepted wild cougar kills in both Virginia and West Virginia were in the 1880s and the animal – eastern cougar, or mountain lion, puma or panther (Puma concolor couguar) – was considered totally exterminated in West Virginia by 1900. In 1936, however, came a last officially confirmed record of cougar tracks in the state; by a Smithsonian worker, near Cranberry Glades in Pocahontas County. Recently, the eastern cougar was federally listed as "endangered" in West Virginia and sporadic, unconfirmed accounts of its presence (tracks and sightings) continued to be reported. P. c. couguar was deemed to be extirpated by a U.S. Fish and Wildlife Service evaluation released in 2011.

Bison
The American bison (Bison bison), was once common in West Virginia, roaming in large herds over the entire state. Numerous place names in Pennsylvania and West Virginia attest to how frequently these animals were encountered in the state. In the late 18th century, European hunters and explorers in the Trans-Allegheny region of the state reported seeing sizable populations, especially along the Ohio and Kanawha Rivers. These herds had beaten down numerous traces or paths between salt licks. (Present day Putnam County (formed in 1848) in particular had been cut by bison trails, as the animals moved to and from the Ohio River. The county's oldest town, Buffalo, is named for them.

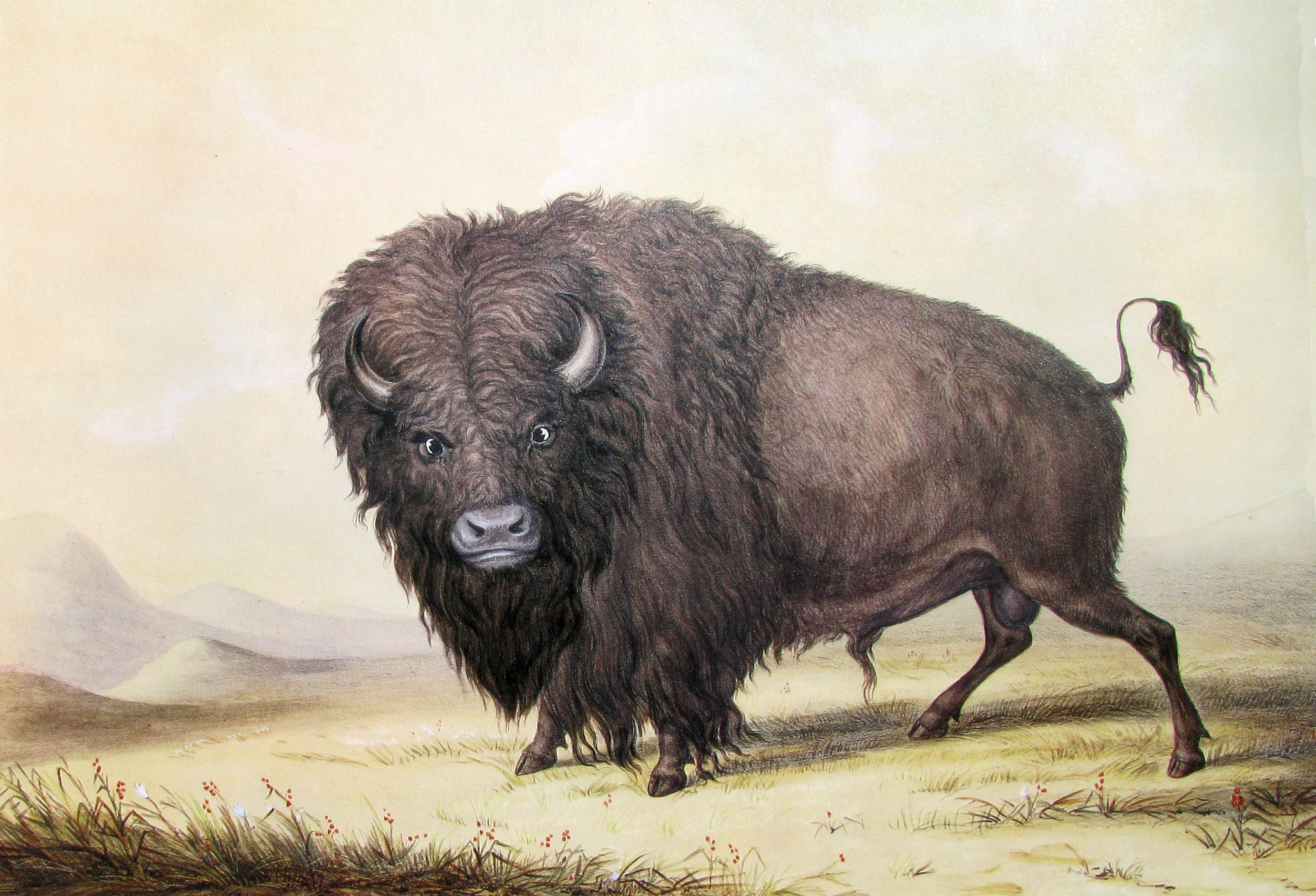
Buffalo Bull Grazing (1845) by George Catlin

Many of these paths became the Indian "roads" later used by the pioneering European settlers. Many decades later, the same bison paths would become the routes followed by early turnpikes and government road systems. Dr. Thomas Walker recorded that 13 bison were killed during his 1743 expedition of the area west of the Alleghenies. Although valued as a source of food by European settlers, many of them engaged in the wanton killing of bison as a sport. Walker noted that, "game in these parts and would have been of much greater advantage to the inhabitants than it has been if the hunters had not killed the Buffaloes for diversion."

Bison in the east were rarely seen by 1800, one was killed near Charleston in 1815, but no more were reported until 1825 when one was killed at Valley Head, the source of the Tygart River in Randolph County. It had been chased from Webster County by dogs.

== Recent reintroductions ==
Virginia (southern) white-tail deer
This subspecies (Odocoileus virginianus virginianus) of white-tail deer originally ranged over all of West Virginia, but was nearly exterminated within the state due to over-hunting. By 1890, the white-tail deer population of West Virginia was officially reported as "near zero". As hunting regulations were enacted, law enforcement personnel hired, game refuges established and restocking started, the deer population gradually was reestablished. In January 1930, eight deer procured from Michigan were released in the Monongahela National Forest near Parsons. Between 1937 and 1939, a total of 17 more deer were released in the Flatrock-Roaring Plains area of Tucker County (DeGarmo 1949). These 25 deer are the only recorded deer releases in Tucker County. Today, this animal is prolific throughout the state.

Beaver
North American beaver (Castor canadensis) were almost completely exterminated from the area now known as West Virginia by 1825 due to trapping by early settlers (Swank 1948). The gradual comeback of beaver started in 1933 when 6 beaver were released on Beaver Dam Refuge in Randolph County. In 1935, 40 animals were released with ten placed in Tucker County.

Fisher
There were reports of the fisher (Pekania pennanti) – also known as Pennant's marten – being trapped in West Virginia and pelts being sold in the 1870s. They were rare in West Virginia by around 1900, with the last reports coming from the high elevation red spruce forests. By 1912, however, the animals were believed to be rare or completely extirpated. They were reintroduced to the state in the winter of 1969, when 23 fishers were translocated from New Hampshire to two sites within the boundaries of the Monongahela National Forest at Canaan Mountain in Tucker County and Cranberry Glades in Pocahontas County.

River otter
The North American river otter (Lontra canadensis) is a native species in West Virginia but its population declined due to loss of habitat and excessive trapping. The last otter was reported to have been trapped in Tucker County in 1954; then a few were seen on the Greenbrier River in Pocahantas County and elsewhere in the early 1960s. In a restoration effort, a total of 245 river otters were released by the WVDNR into 14 major river systems in West Virginia between 1984 and early 1997 Based on otter sightings, sign and trap mortalities, the river otter is known to be successfully reestablished in the state.

Elk

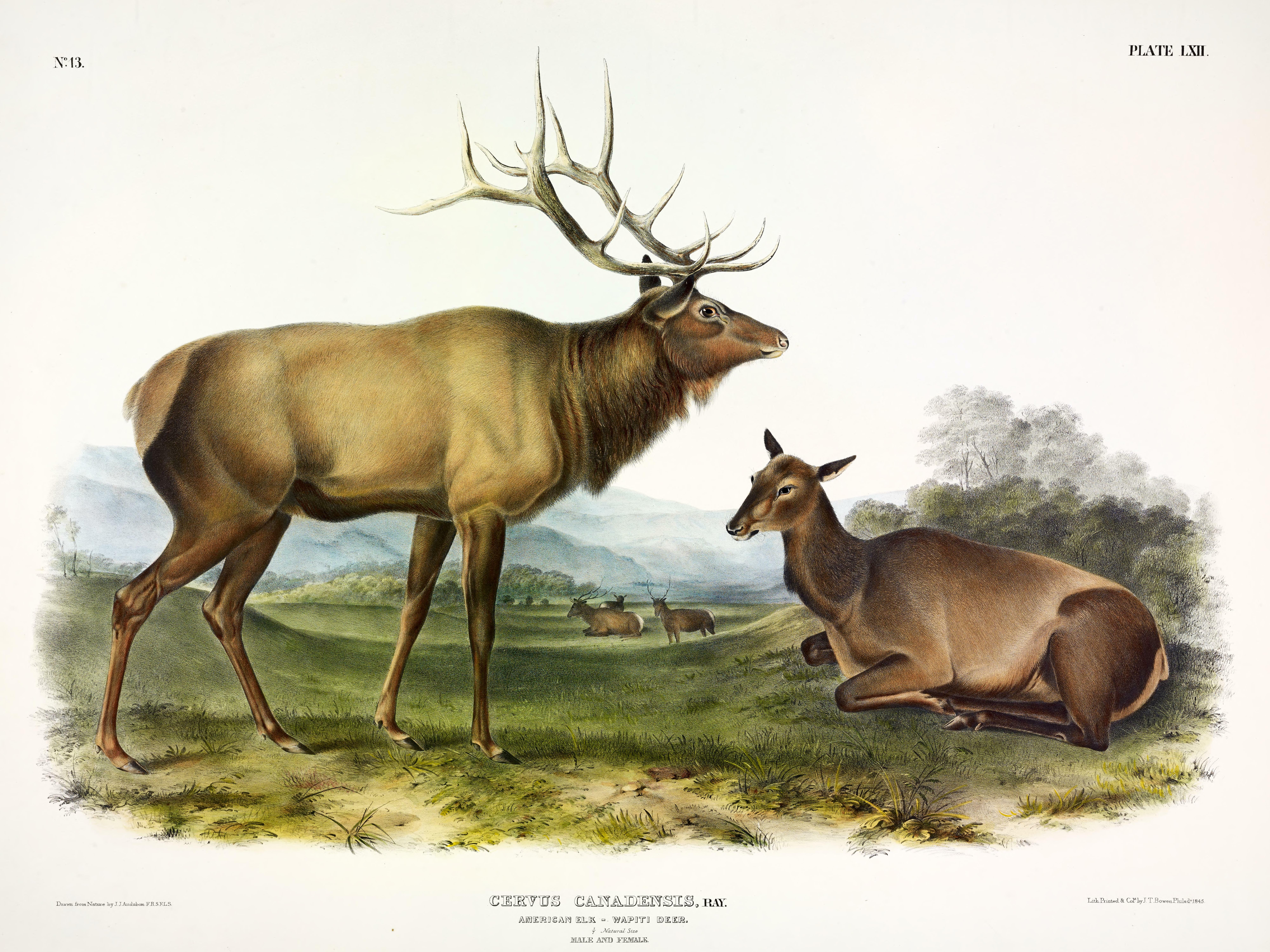
American Elk (c. 1845) by John James Audubon

Substantial eastern elk (Cervus canadensis canadensis) populations did not long survive the advance of European settlement into western Virginia in the late 18th and early 19th centuries. The last individual in the region around what became Doddridge County was killed by settler Winter Hutson (1814–1895) shortly after he arrived there in 1837. Elk survived longest in the rugged Alleghenies to the east. In about 1843, three were killed in Canaan Valley, Virginia, by members of the Flanagan and Carr families, local settlers who habitually hunted there. These were long thought to be the last elk found wild in the region that later became West Virginia. Sporadic elk sightings were again reported, however, near the headwaters of the Tygart and Greenbrier Rivers as late as 1875. If this is accurate, they were nonetheless certainly gone by 1880 when the subspecies as a whole is considered to have been completely exterminated.

The neighboring state of Kentucky actively reintroduced Rocky Mountain elk (C. c. nelsoni) to their eastern woodlands in 1997, and by 2009 the population had increased to over 10,000 animals. This expanding population began to enter western Virginia and the southwestern counties of West Virginia. In 2011, the West Virginia Division of Natural Resources (WVDNR) drafted an Elk Management Plan to encourage the passive reintroduction of elk to the state. As of 2021, the reintroduction process is ongoing.

== Ice Age (Pleistocene) mammals of West Virginia ==
Fossil site(s) indicated in parentheses.

Megafauna:

- Megalonyx jeffersonii, or Jefferson's ground sloth (first found in 1796 in Haynes Cave, Monroe County)
- Mammuthus spp., mammoths, including the woolly mammoth (M. primigenius); 12 specimens known in state
- Mammut americanum, American mastodon (Cabell County, several specimens)
- Bootherium bombifrons, Harlan's (or woodland) muskox (Brooke County)
- Rangifer tarandus, caribou
- Platygonus vetus, peccary
- Smilodon spp., saber-toothed cat (Greenbrier and Pendleton Counties)
- Miracinonyx inexpectatus, a cheetah
- Panthera onca augusta, Pleistocene North American jaguar (Pendleton County)
- Aenocyon dirus, dire wolf
- Arctodus pristinus, a giant bear

Small mammals:

- Dasypus bellus, a Pleistocene armadillo (first found in the state in Organ Cave, Greenbrier County; now also known from Berkeley County (1995))
- Desmodus spp., a vampire bat
- Sorex arcticus, Arctic shrew
- Synaptomys borealis, northern bog lemming
- Atopomys salvelinus, Trout Cave vole (Trout Cave, Pendleton County, etc.)
- Plesiothomomys spp., Cumberland Cave pocket gopher (first found in Cumberland Bone Cave)
- Pitymys cumberlandensis, Cumberland Cave vole
- Peromyscus cumberlandensis, Cumberland Cave mouse
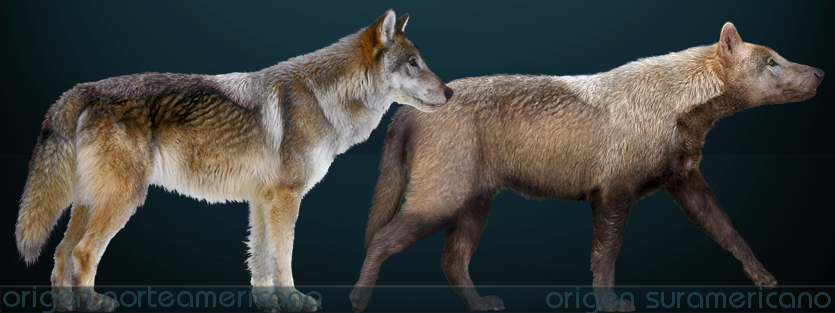
  Reconstructions of dire wolves (Aenocyon dirus); extinct since about 10,000 years BP

== See also ==
- Lists of mammals by region
- West Virginia State Wildlife Center, a small zoo featuring native West Virginia animals
- Fauna of West Virginia
- List of West Virginia wildlife management areas
