= Northern ravine salamander =

Conservation status
- Least Concern (IUCN 3.1)

Scientific classification
- Kingdom: Animalia
- Phylum: Chordata
- Class: Amphibia
- Order: Urodela
- Family: Plethodontidae
- Genus: Plethodon
- Species: P. electromorphus

Binomial name
- Plethodon electromorphus Highton, 1999

Species of amphibian

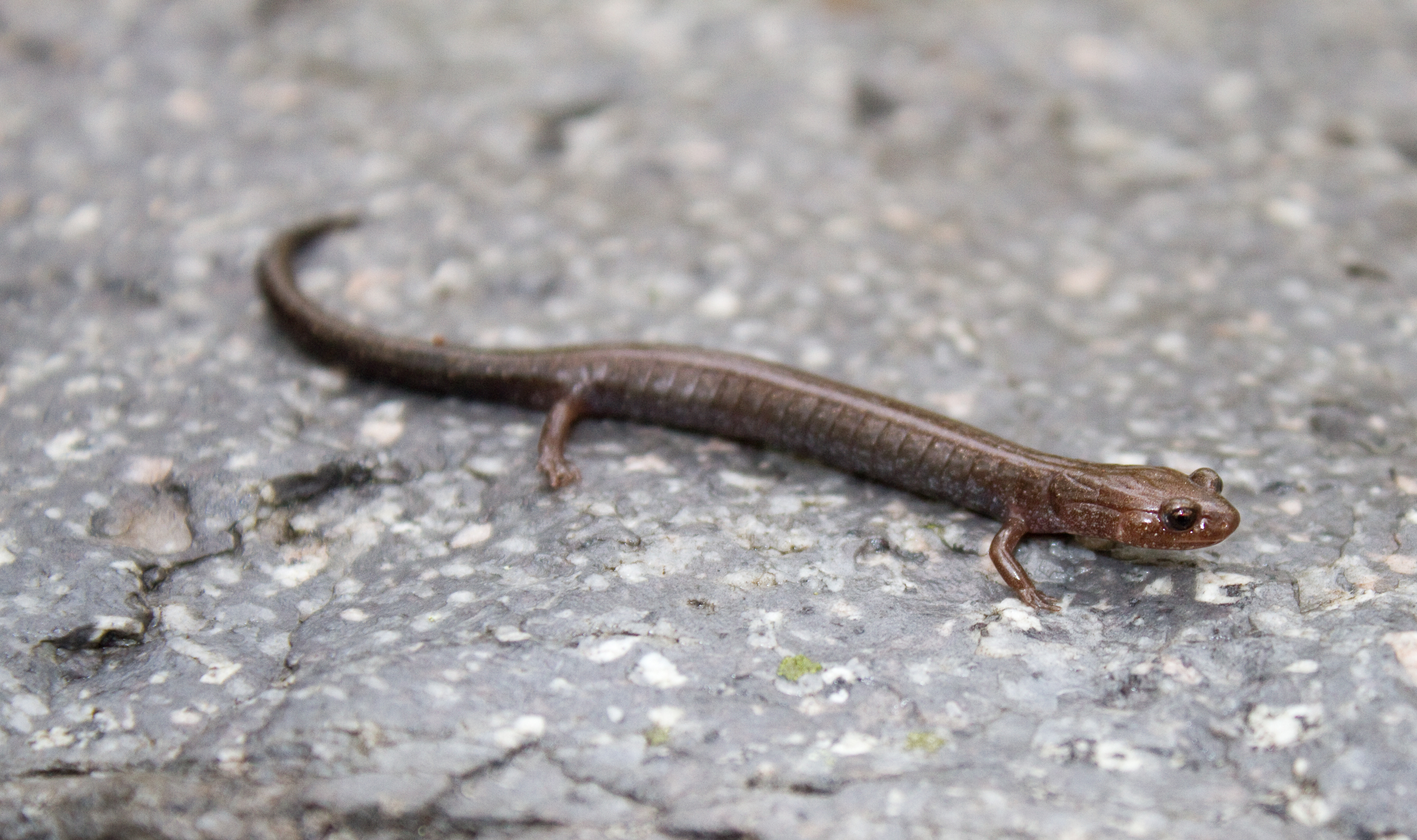
Northern Ravine Salamander specimen

The northern ravine salamander (Plethodon electromorphus) is a species of salamander in the family Plethodontidae. The species is endemic to the United States.

== Geographic range ==
The northern ravine salamander has been found in Indiana, Ohio, Kentucky, Pennsylvania, and West Virginia.

== Habitat ==
The natural habitats of P. electromorphus are temperate forests and rocky areas.

== Conservation status ==
The species P. electromorphus is listed as Least Concern on the IUCN Red List of Threatened Species.

== Description ==
The northern ravine salamander is a small terrestrial salamander, 7.5–11.5 cm (3.0–4.5 in) in total length. It is elongated, slender, and short-legged. Its coloration is brown to nearly black, sprinkled with minute silvery white and bronzy or brassy specks. It has very small, irregular white blotches on the lower sides, and a virtually plain dark belly with a lightly mottled chin.

== Taxonomy ==
The northern ravine salamander was previously considered to be a part of Plethodon richmondi (southern ravine salamander). Electrophoresis, from which the specific name electromorphus is derived, was used to distinguish them.

== Behavior ==
The northern ravine salamander is less aggressive than the more widespread red-backed salamander (Plethodon cinereus).
