= West Virginia State Wildlife Center =

Zoological park in the United States

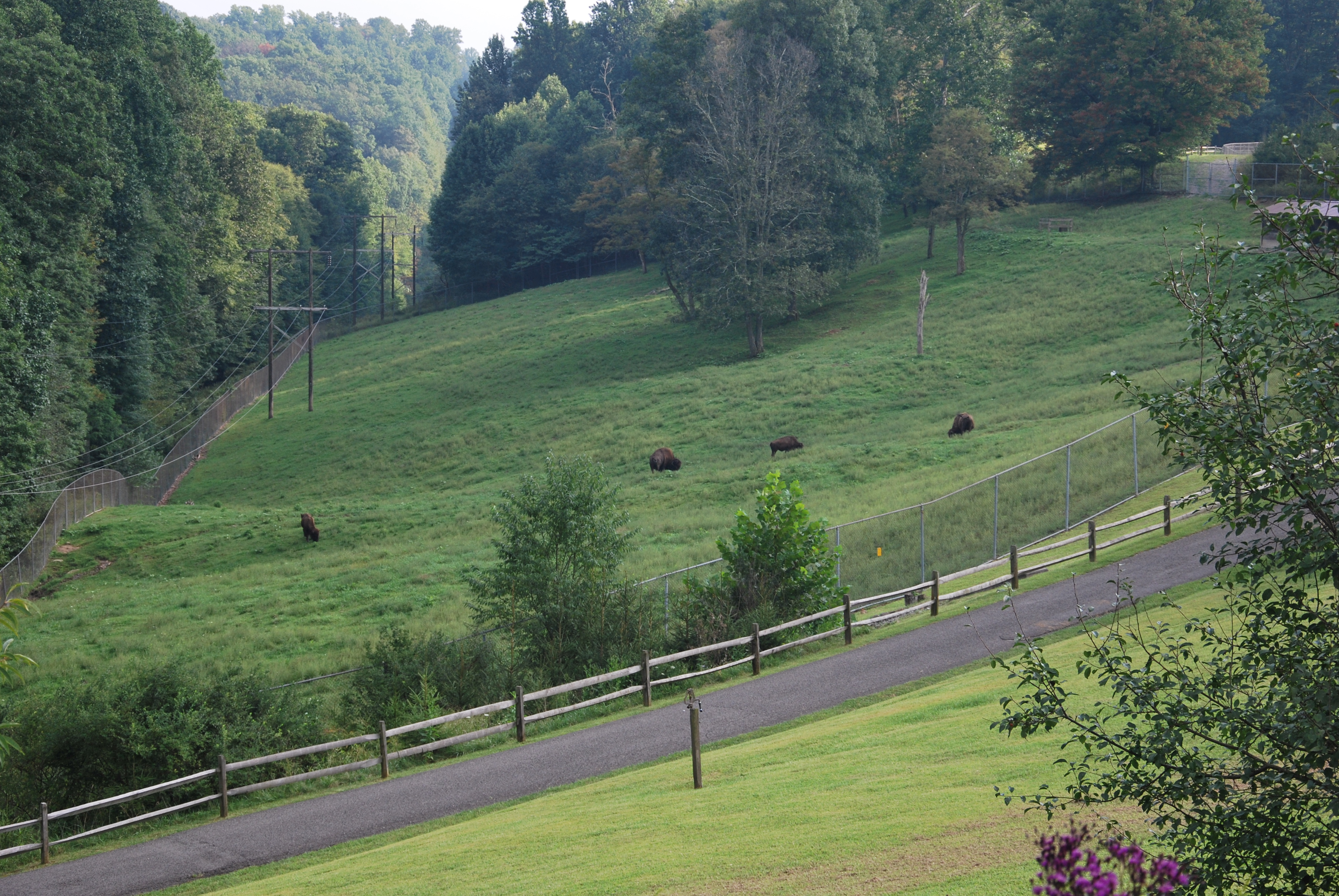
- Bison exhibit at the West Virginia State Wildlife Center.

- Location within West Virginia Location within the United States
- Location: Upshur, West Virginia, United States
- Coordinates: 38°51′19″N 80°18′41″W
- Area: 338 acres (137 ha)
- Elevation: 1,745 ft (532 m)
- Website: wvdnr.gov/outdoor-recreation/west-virginia-wildlife-center/

The West Virginia State Wildlife Center is a zoological park in French Creek, West Virginia. Operated by the West Virginia Division of Natural Resources, the Wildlife Center displays many of West Virginia's wildlife, including both native and introduced species. A few of the animals at the Wildlife Center were once found naturally in West Virginia, but were extirpated by the early 1900s.

The Wildlife Center comprises 338 acres (137 ha) and displays 29 different species of West Virginia mammals, birds, and reptiles, which are located along a 1.25-mile (2.01 km)trail through a mature hardwood forest. The animal exhibits are spacious chain-link enclosures within an actual West Virginian forest, which allows the animals to interact with the environment and behave in more natural ways than one would see in most other zoos that attempt to recreate the environment. Since 1978, the Wildlife Center has been the home of French Creek Freddie, West Virginia's official Groundhog Day meteorologist. The Wildlife Center receives about 50,000 visitors per year.

== History ==
By the early 20th century, many of West Virginia's major fauna were either extirpated or driven dangerously close to extirpation due to uncontrolled habitat loss and overhunting. By 1911, many of the state's most common large mammals, such as elk, bison, wolves, and mountain lions, had been completely eradicated. Even animals that are common in the state today, such as the white-tailed deer and wild turkey, were nearly wiped out by uncontrolled habitat loss and hunting. Growing concerns for West Virginia's wildlife led the state's government to create the French Creek Game Farm in 1923, where native West Virginian wildlife could be bred and reintroduced back into the wild. Eventually, ecologists learned that animals bred in captivity lack the instincts that are necessary to survive in the wild, so the reintroduction projects were discontinued, but the Game Farm remained open as a popular tourist attraction. The Game Farm remained popular because it allowed people to see animals that no longer existed in the state, and also because many of the animals displayed at the Game Farm are too elusive to be commonly seen in the wild, even though several of the species are often found near people's houses.

In 1986, the French Creek Game Farm was renamed the West Virginia State Wildlife Center. Today, the Wildlife Center serves to educate visitors about West Virginia's wildlife of the past and present and about the history of wildlife conservation. In addition to animal exhibits, the Wildlife Center also possesses a gift shop; an additional trail through the forest; picnic areas with grills and picnic tables; and a large fishing pond that is stocked with trout, bass, catfish, and bluegill. Future projects include an educational center, an auditorium, a nocturnal animal exhibit, reptile exhibits, aquatic mammal exhibits, an aviary, and an aquarium.

== Animals on display ==
Logo of West Virginia State Wildlife Center

- Groundhog (Marmota monax)
- Red fox (Vulpes vulpes)
- Gray fox (Urocyon cinereoargenteus)
- Coyote (Canis latrans)
- Wolf (Canis lupus) (Extirpated)
- American black bear (Ursus americanus)
- Raccoon (Procyon lotor)
- Fisher (Pekania pennanti) (Reintroduced)
- North American river otter (Lontra canadensis) (Reintroduced)
- Striped skunk (Mephitis mephitis)
- Bobcat (Lynx rufus)
- Cougar (Puma concolor) (Extirpated)
- Wild boar (Sus scrofa) (Introduced)
- Elk (Cervus canadensis) (Reintroduced)
- White-tailed deer (Odocoileus virginianus)
- American bison (Bison bison) (Extirpated)
- Canada goose (Branta canadensis)
- Turkey vulture (Cathartes aura)
- Bald eagle (Haliaeetus leucocephalus)
- Red-tailed hawk (Buteo jamaicensis)
- Golden eagle (Aquila chrysaetos)
- Common pheasant (Phasianus colchicus) (Introduced)
- Wild turkey (Meleagris gallopavo)
- Eastern screech owl (Megascops asio)
- Great horned owl (Bubo virginianus)
- Barred owl (Strix varia)
- Eastern ratsnake (Pantherophis alleghaniensis)
- Eastern copperhead (Agkistrodon contortrix)
- Timber rattlesnake (Crotalus horridus)

== Location ==
The West Virginia Wildlife Center is located about 12 miles south of Buckhannon on WV 20, at the intersection of WV 20 and Alexander Road, also known to some locally as "the Game Farm road," referencing the previous name of the facility. To reach the Wildlife Center, take WV 20 from Buckhannon (or from the south, from Flatwoods, use I-79 Exit 67 to US 19 north, WV 4 north, to WV 20 north), then turn onto Alexander Road. The entrance will be on the right after about 1/4 mile.

== See also ==
- Fauna of West Virginia
- List of mammals of West Virginia
- List of birds of West Virginia
- List of reptiles of West Virginia
- List of amphibians of West Virginia
- List of fishes of West Virginia
