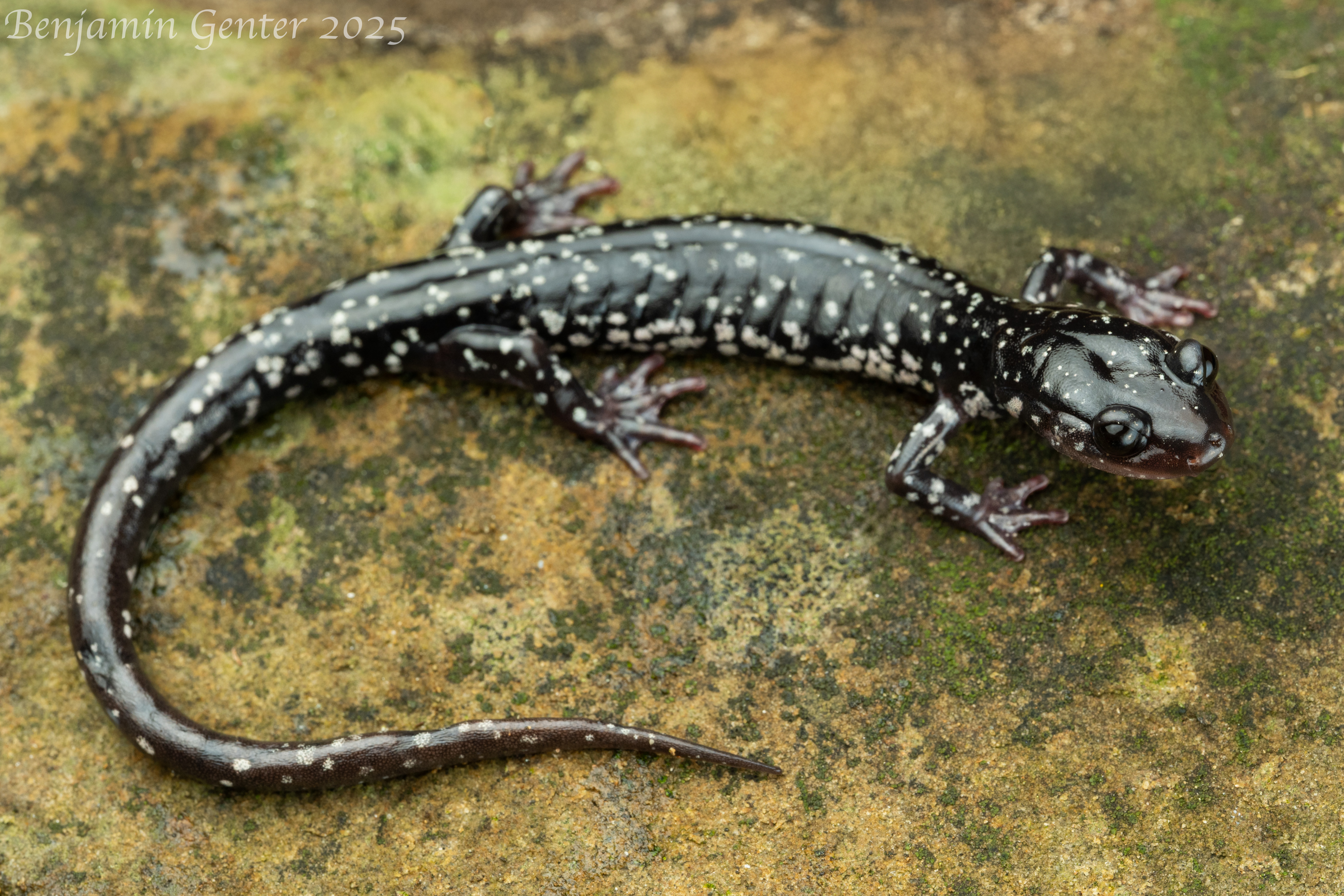

Conservation status
- Least Concern (IUCN 3.1)

Scientific classification
- Kingdom: Animalia
- Phylum: Chordata
- Class: Amphibia
- Order: Urodela
- Family: Plethodontidae
- Genus: Plethodon
- Species: P. kentucki

Binomial name
- Plethodon kentucki Mittleman, 1951

Synonyms
- Plethodon jordani kentucki — Schmidt, 1953

= Cumberland Plateau salamander =

Species of amphibian

The Cumberland Plateau salamander (Plethodon kentucki) is a species of salamander in the family Plethodontidae. It is endemic to the Cumberland Plateau, the southeastern United States. Its natural habitat is temperate forests. It is threatened by habitat loss.

== Description ==
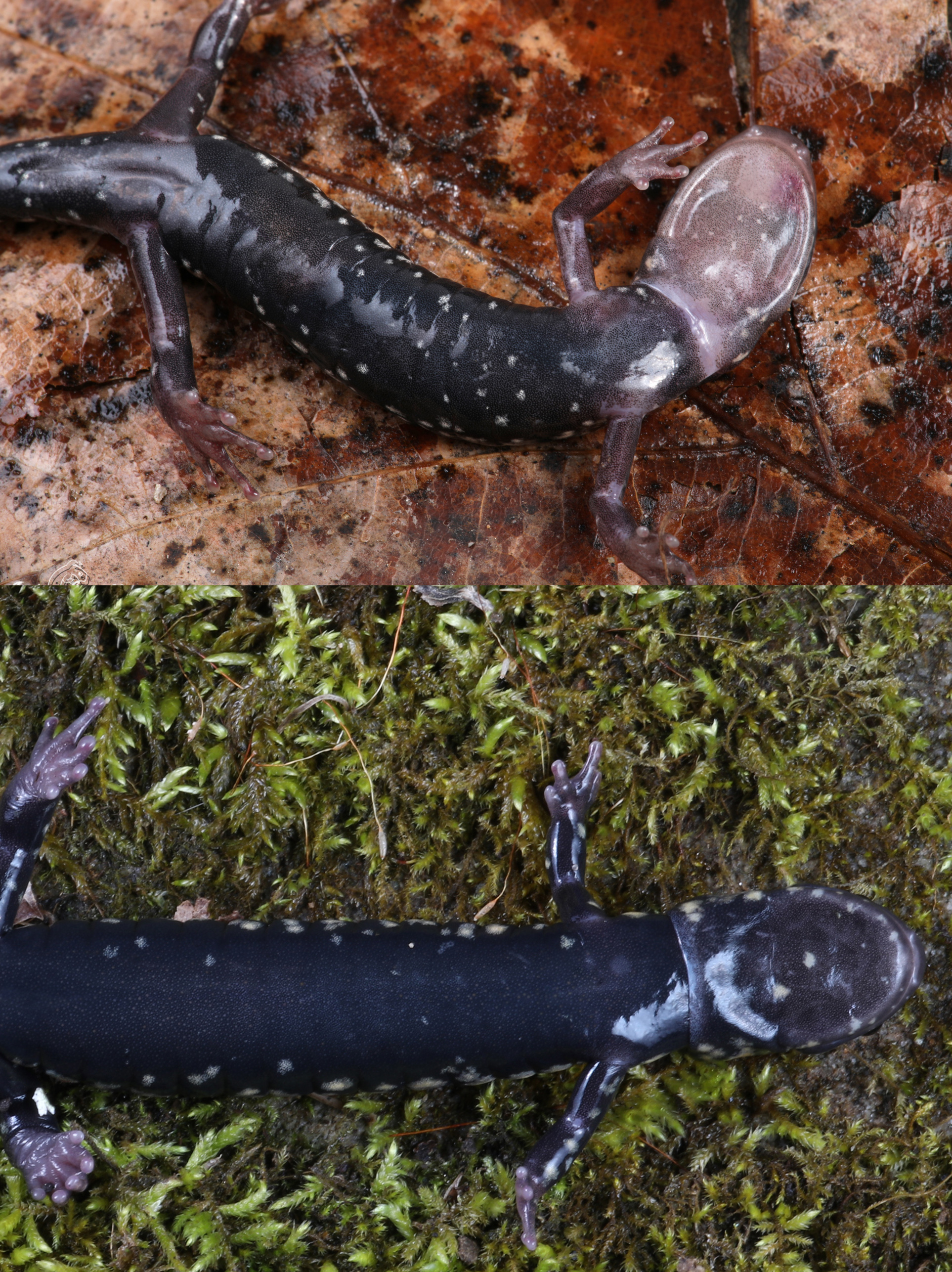

A medium to large sized terrestrial Plethodontid salamander which is similar in appearance and life history to the Northern slimy salamander, which it is sympatric with. However, the Cumberland Plateau salamander is slimmer in appearance and has a light chin above the gular fold as opposed to the dark chin of the slimy salamanders in the area. The Cumberland plateau salamander was first described in 1951, but the validity of the species was questioned in 1955 until it was validated in 1983. This species likely hybridizes with Plethodon glutinosus; hybridization is common with other members of the slimy salamander complex.

== Distribution ==
Found in the Cumberland plateau in eastern Kentucky, western West Virginia, northern Tennessee and western Virginia, the species is not found east of the Kanawha and New rivers.
