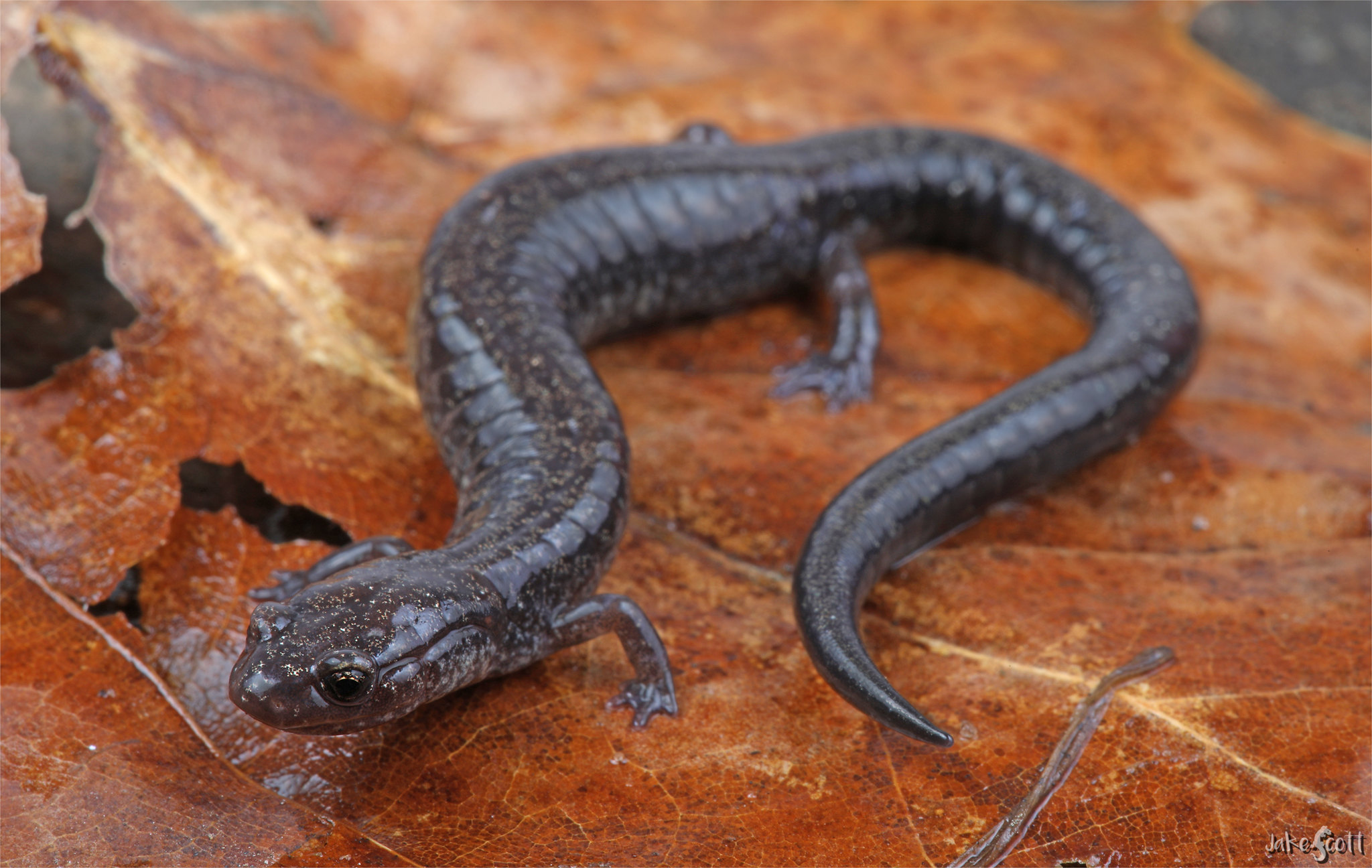

Conservation status
- Least Concern (IUCN 3.1)

Scientific classification
- Kingdom: Animalia
- Phylum: Chordata
- Class: Amphibia
- Order: Urodela
- Family: Plethodontidae
- Genus: Plethodon
- Species: P. richmondi

Binomial name
- Plethodon richmondi Netting & Mittleman, 1938

= Ravine salamander =

Species of amphibian

The ravine salamander (Plethodon richmondi) is a species of salamander in the family Plethodontidae. The species is endemic to the United States, and it is threatened by habitat loss.

== Etymology ==
The epithet, richmondi, is in honor of its discoverer, Neil D. Richmond, who later succeeded M. Graham Netting as Curator of the Section of Amphibians and Reptiles at the Carnegie Museum of Natural History, Pittsburgh, Pennsylvania.

== Description ==
An adult ravine salamander is 7.5–11.5 cm (3–4½ inches) in total length (including tail). It has short limbs and is somewhat worm-like in appearance and movement. Dorsally and laterally, it is dark brown or black, with silvery or brassy flecks. Ventrally, unlike other small plethodontids, it is dark brown or black.

== Geographic range ==
The ravine salamander is found in eastern Kentucky, Ohio, southern West Virginia, western Virginia, and northwestern North Carolina, northeastern Tennessee.

== Habitat and behavior ==
The natural habitat of P. richmondi is temperate forests, in which it prefers the slopes of valleys and ravines. It is a terrestrial species and is found among the leaf litter, hiding under logs, stones or stumps. It hibernates underground in winter and aestivates at the height of summer.

=== Reproduction ===
Eggs of P. richmondi are laid in cracks and crevices and develop directly into juvenile salamanders without an intervening larval stage.

== Conservation status ==
The main threats facing the ravine salamander are degradation of its habitat, and some sub-populations have been destroyed by this. However, it is a common species in its wide geographic range and occurs in several protected areas, and overall the population seems steady. For these reasons, the International Union for Conservation of Nature has assessed it as being of "least concern".
