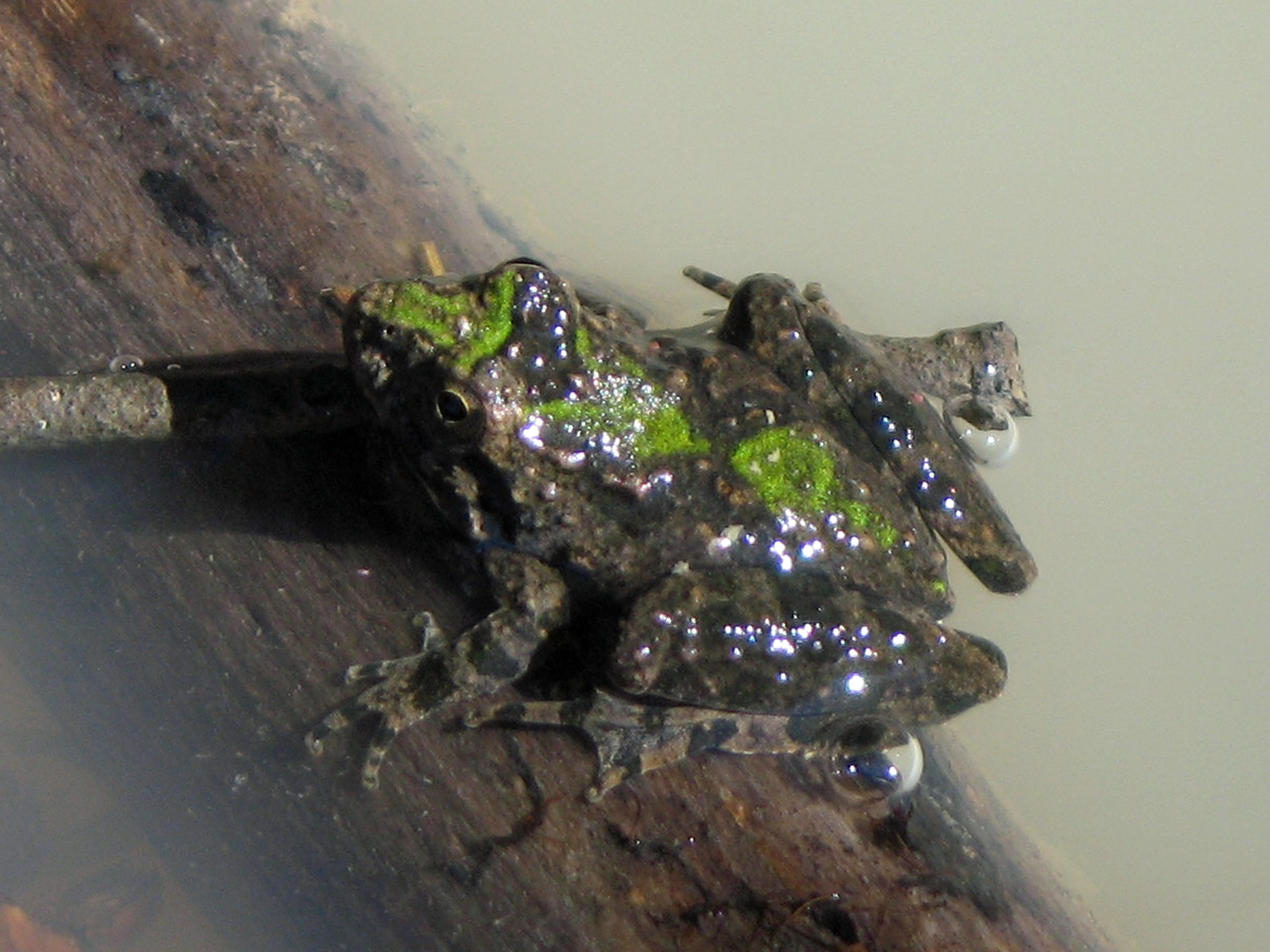
- Acris crepitans

Scientific classification
- Domain: Eukaryota
- Kingdom: Animalia
- Phylum: Chordata
- Class: Amphibia
- Order: Anura
- Family: Hylidae
- Subfamily: Acrisinae; Mivart, 1869

Type genus
- Acris Duméril & Bibron, 1841

Genera
- See text

Synonyms
- Acridina Mivart, 1869 (unavailable); Acridinae Kuhn, 1965 (unavailable); Acridini Dubois, Ohler, & Duellman, 2017 (unavailable); Hyliolini Dubois, Ohler, & Duellman, 2017; Acrisini Dubois, Ohler, & Duellman, 2017

= Acrisinae =

Subfamily of amphibians

Acrisinae is a subfamily of the tree frog family Hylidae. There are only two genera in this subfamily, Acris (cricket frogs) and Pseudacris (chorus frogs). They are native to most of the Nearctic realm, and are found as far north as the Great Slave Lake in Canada, all across the United States, and down Baja California and some parts of northern Mexico. One species, the pacific tree frog (Pseudacris regilla), has been introduced to several locations outside its range, and it is possible that other species may have been as well.

These frogs are mainly found on woody vegetation near water in habitats such as grasslands, wetlands, swamps, and vernal pools.

== Genera and species ==
There are currently two genera (Acris and Pseudacris) comprising 21 species in the subfamily Acrisinae. Acris is found throughout the eastern half of North America while Pseudacris is found all over the continent with the highest diversity on the western coast of North America.

Acris (cricket frogs)

- Blanchard's cricket frog (Acris blanchardi)
- Northern cricket frog (Acris crepitans)
- Southern cricket frog (Acris gryllus)

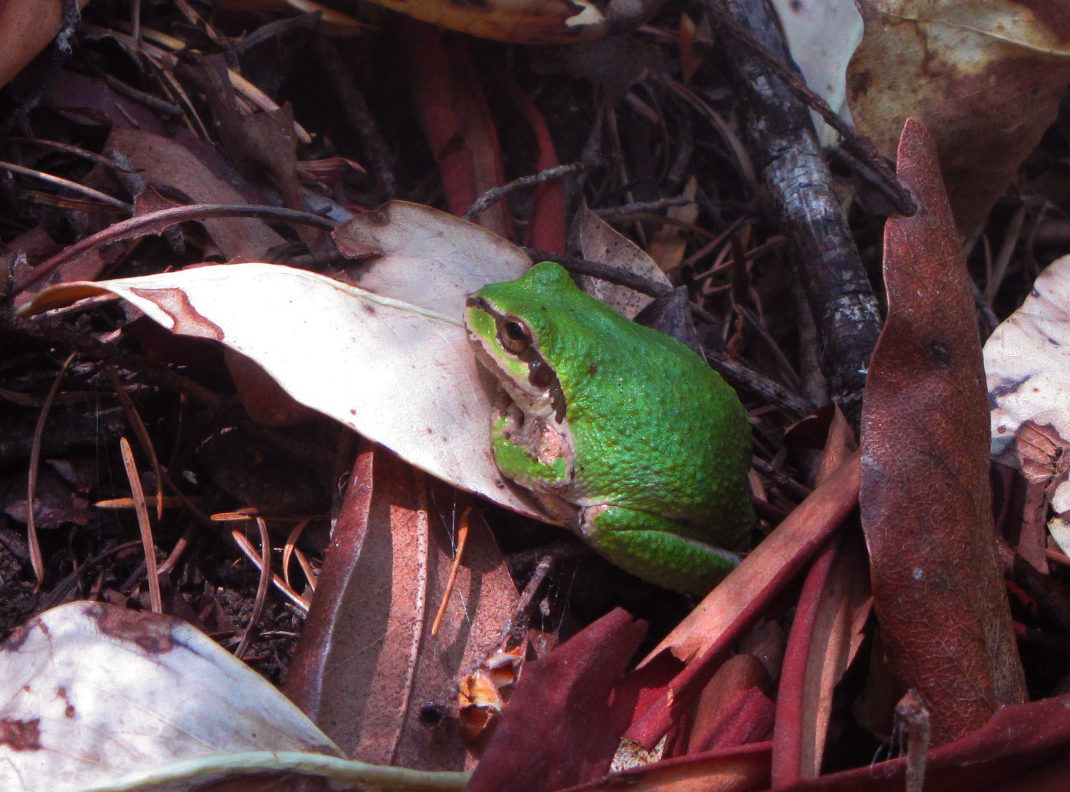
Pacific tree frog (Pseudacris regilla)

Pseudacris (chorus frogs)

- Appalachian mountain chorus frog (Pseudacris brachyphona)
- Brimley's chorus frog (Pseudacris brimleyi)
- California tree frog (Pseudacris cadaverina)
- Spotted chorus frog (Pseudacris clarkii)
- Collinses' mountain chorus frog (Pseudacris collinsorum)
- Spring peeper (Pseudacris crucifer)
- Upland chorus frog (Pseudacris feriarum)
- Cajun chorus frog (Pseudacris fouquettei)
- Baja California chorus frog (Pseudacris hypochondriaca)
- Illinois chorus frog (Pseudacris illinoensis)
- New Jersey chorus frog (Pseudacris kalmi)
- Boreal chorus frog (Pseudacris maculata)
- Southern chorus frog (Pseudacris nigrita)
- Little grass frog (Pseudacris ocularis)
- Ornate chorus frog (Pseudacris ornata)
- Pacific tree frog (Pseudacris regilla)
- Sierran tree frog (Pseudacris sierra)
- Strecker's chorus frog (Pseudacris streckeri)
- Western chorus frog (Pseudacris triseriata)
