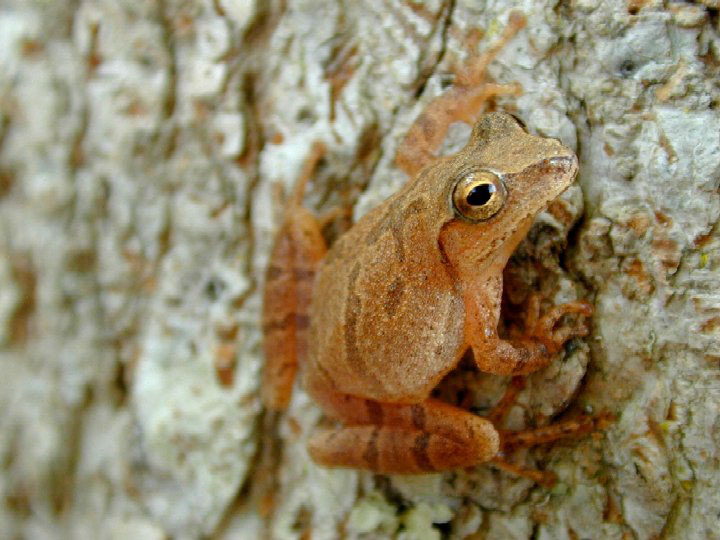

Conservation status
- Least Concern (IUCN 3.1)

- Secure (NatureServe)

Scientific classification
- Kingdom: Animalia
- Phylum: Chordata
- Class: Amphibia
- Order: Anura
- Family: Hylidae
- Genus: Pseudacris
- Species: P. crucifer

Binomial name
- Pseudacris crucifer (Wied-Neuwied, 1838)
- Range of P. crucifer

Synonyms
- Hyla crucifer Wied-Neuwied, 1838; Hylodes pickeringii Holbrook, 1839; Acris pickeringii — Jan, 1857; Hyliola pickeringii — Mocquard, 1899; Hyla pickeringii — Cope, 1899; Hyla crucifer — Myers, 1927; Parapseudacris crucifer — Hardy & Borroughs, 1986; Pseudacris crucifer — Hedges, 1986; Hyla crucifer — Cocroft, 1994

= Spring peeper =

Species of amphibian

The spring peeper (Pseudacris crucifer) is a small chorus frog widespread throughout the eastern United States and eastern Canada. It prefers permanent ponds due to its advantage in avoiding predation; however, it is very adaptable with respect to the habitat it can live in. In northern regions, the frog is able to endure below freezing temperatures due to the capacity of its liver to exude and flush the bloodstream with a glucose cryoprotectant which acts both as an anti-freeze in its blood, and allows organs like the heart to enter into a state of protected dormancy. The peeper earned its name from its chirping call, which marks the beginning of spring. Crucifer is derived from the Latin root meaning "cross-bearing", a reference to the cross-like pattern on the spring peeper's dorsal side.

These chirping calls are significant for communication in mating as females choose their mates based on the frequency and volume associated with them. Satellite males who do not make any calls also strategically place themselves near those that make louder calls in an attempt to intercept females.

Temperature plays a large role in when the spring peeper begins breeding as well as the duration of mating. Warm spells result in a massive increased calling rate.

== Description ==
The spring peeper is a tan, grey, or brown frog with a dark cross on its dorsa (thus the Latin name crucifer, meaning cross-bearer), though sometimes the marking may be indistinct. Dark lines can also be found between the eyes and in a crossband on the hindlimbs of P. crucifer. It has a body length between less than 25 mm (0.98 in) to 38 mm (1.5 in) and a mass between 3 and 5 g (0.11 and 0.18 oz).

Unlike some other Pseudacris species, P. crucifer does not have white lines on its lips, but its lips may be lighter than its head.

== Anatomy and physiology ==
The species has large toe pads for climbing, although it is more at home amid the loose debris of the forest floor. Because of its toepads, the spring peeper was once thought to be more closely related to treefrogs than chorus frogs and was placed in the genus Hyla, but it is now in the genus Pseudacris.

The color variations of P. crucifer are mostly tan, brown, yellow, pink, olive green, and gray. All have a slightly pale yellow coloration on the inside of the thighs. Females are lighter-colored, while males are slightly smaller and usually have dark throats. Females have a bulkier abdomen. Skin color of Spring Peepers is also affected by temperature and light. Coloration is dynamic and adaptable in this species. It can be altered quickly, in 15 to 45 minutes, in order to better camouflage from predators.

This frog has a vocal sac that expands and deflates like a balloon to create a short and distinct peeping sound. Only males can make this loud high-pitched noise, and they use it to attract mates.

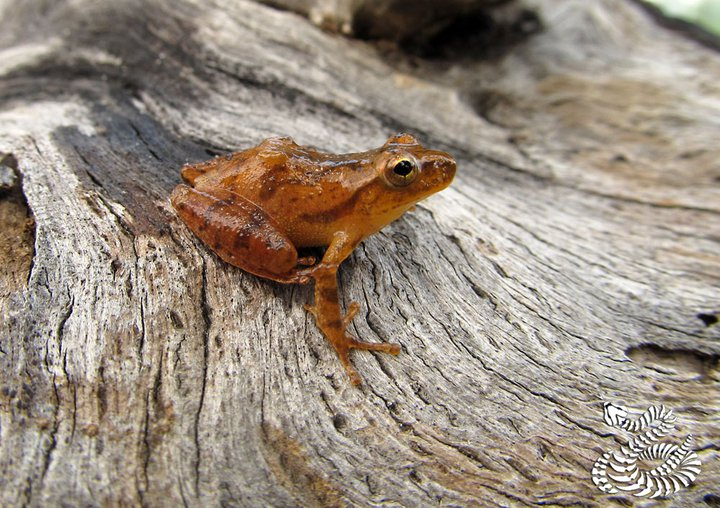
Spring peeper, adult, Florida

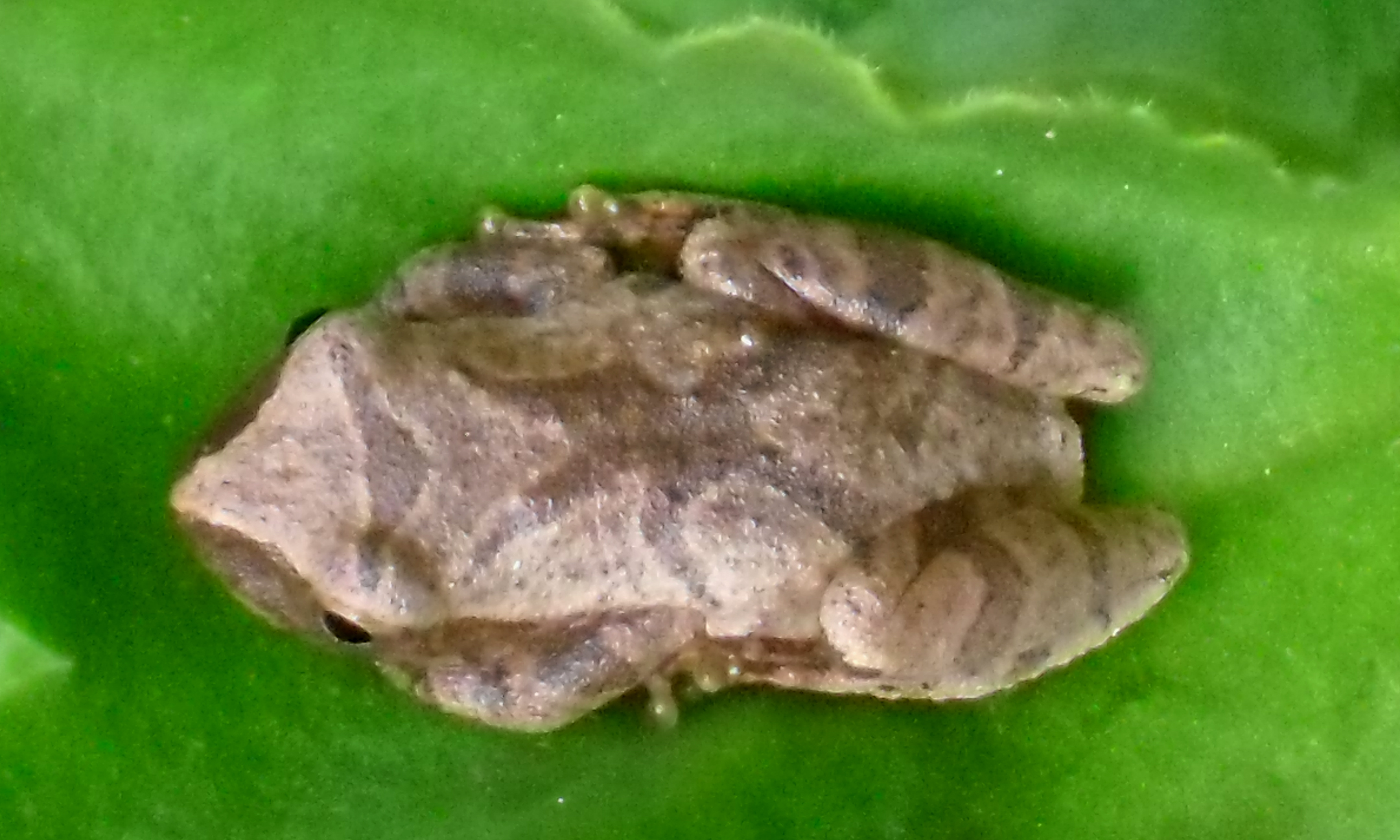
Spring peepers are distinguished by a dark X-shaped marking on their back.

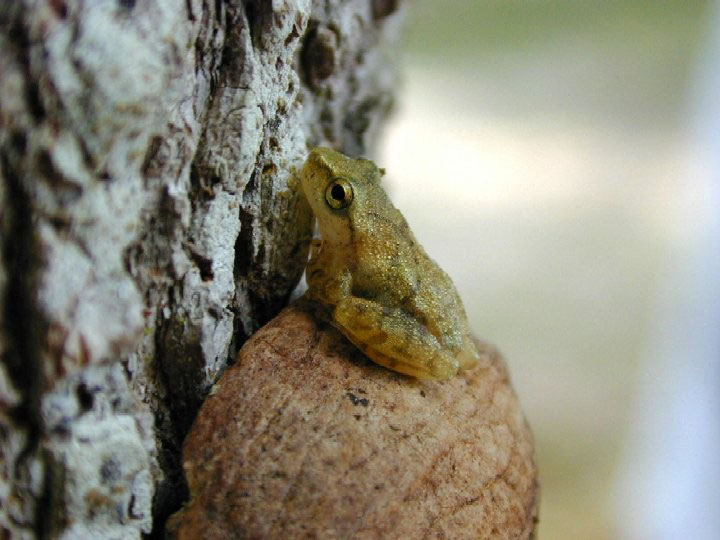
Spring peeper, adult

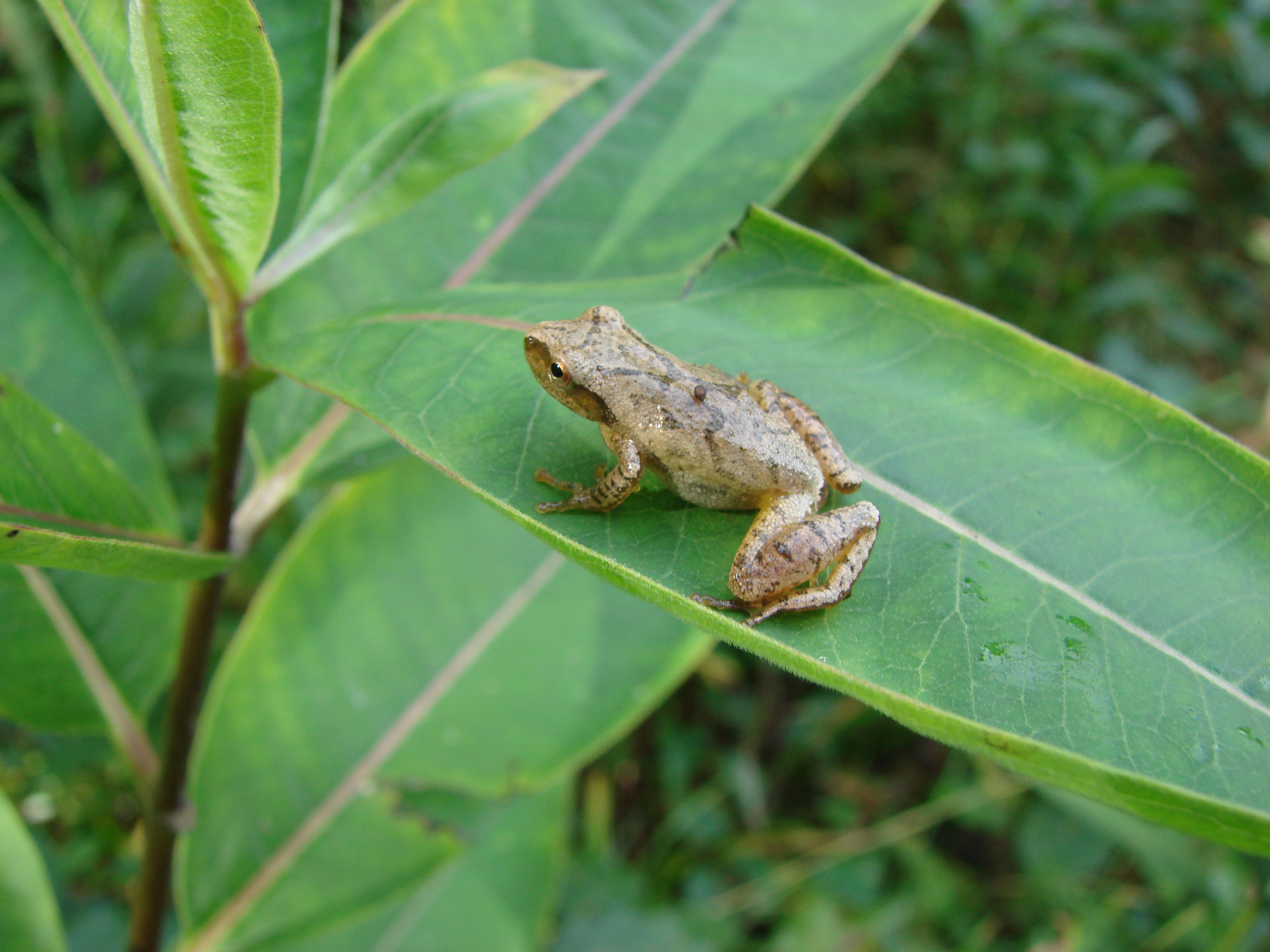
Spring peeper, adult

In the female spring peeper, protruding beyond the lower jaw of the frog sits its snout. Through the use of adhesive pads located on the tips of their non-webbed fingers, spring peepers can stick to particular materials. Males and females are differentiated from one another through the darkening of the skin beneath the jaw in males. Males have a body length ranging from 18–30 millimetres (0.71–1.18 in), and females have a body length ranging from 20–35 millimetres (0.79–1.38 in).

=== Glands and toxins ===
In Pseudacris crucifer males, the blackened pigmentation of the testis affects the seminiferous tubules, the underside of the peritoneum, and the organ itself. The tubules of the testis are surrounded by a pigment layer and a layer of flattened epithelial cells which are located within the surrounding connective tissue. The thickness of an average testis is about 1.10 mm and 2.5 mm in length. The spermatogonia are a cluster of masses jutting out from the tubule lumen. In the late fall, the spermatozoa, located in the seminiferous tubules of the spring peeper, mature and remain there until the spring for breeding. After the seminiferous tubules are emptied, during mating season, the pigmentation of the testis changes from black to a dull grey.

In the spring peeper, most of its energy is used during courtship. Higher energetic costs in female spring peepers are associated with gametogenesis, which occurs before breeding. Stored reserves of fat and glycogen contents can be measured early in the reproductive process to determine the amount used in spring peepers and their correlation to body size. Nonpolar lipid and glycogen content in male spring peepers increased with body mass, whereas in females, it decreased or had minimal variation. The fiber triglyceride and glycogen contents of the female spring peeper's liver increased significantly slower than in males as body mass increased. At the beginning of the breeding season, male spring peepers have more significant amounts of bodily lipid content. Therefore, those that are larger are experiencing lower efficiencies in calling. More reserves of glycogen and lipids are required to maintain calling during the season and require additional rationing of reserves to prepare themselves for courtship. In females, there is a positive correlation between their snout length and wet ovary mass, which also correlates to an increase in body size.

=== Respiratory and circulatory system ===
The bigger, older, and more fit male spring peepers are typically superior callers. These types of males utilize citrate synthase and β-hydroxyacyl CoA dehydrogenase in their muscles at greater levels. Males with higher calling rates also tend to inhibit larger ventricles and greater concentrations of blood hemoglobin; both the large ventricle size and blood hemoglobin concentrations play a significant role in the speed of oxygen consumption, which is intensely linked to the calling rate. When a male spring peeper calls, the sound is made by the contraction of external and internal oblique muscles which subsequently force air out of the lungs, then move through the larynx to the vocal sac. Of the total body weight of male spring peepers, 15% is made up of the trunk muscles – which contain 2% of lipids in the body by volume – and showcase enzymes with mitochondrial markers. Calls that occur at rapid rates result in prominent energetic costs, which is why stored lipids are the source of 90% of energy applied to calling.

=== Thermoregulation ===
Climate plays a major role in the timing of spring peeper breeding: studies have shown a correlation between temperature and the date of first call (when spring peepers start to breed). Though the precise factors affecting breeding timing are complex, there has been a trend towards earlier breeding as average temperatures have increased since the early 20th century.

Another impact of temperature is the duration of mating calls. There is a negative relationship between the length of mating calls and throat temperature. However, male spring peepers with superior calling frequencies are positively related to throat temperature. The temperature of the surrounding environment of spring peepers also plays a role in the rate of calls, which is positively associated with the success of males during the mating and breeding period, showing that increasing site and throat temperatures result in increasing dominant frequency.

Spring peepers are known to tolerate freezing temperatures by producing a glucose-based cryoprotectant to limit cell shrinkage and prevent cell freezing. To do this, P. crucifer distributes glucose throughout their bodies, raising levels of tissue glucose by as much as 10-100x above normal levels.

== Geographic range and habitat ==
The southern spring peeper's habitat includes the Gulf Coast from southeastern Texas to southeastern Georgia and northern Florida, United States. Its northern conspecific occurs in the entire east of the Mississippi and ranges to the Atlantic provinces in Canada as far west as Saskatchewan.

Spring peepers live primarily in forests and regenerating woodlands near ephemeral or semipermanent wetlands. They frequently occur in breeding aggregations of several hundred individuals, and commonly breeds in temporary ponds (vernal ponds, which eventually dry during the summer months), intermediate ponds that have interchanging periods of being dry and wet every year, ponds customarily filled year-round, swamps, and disturbed habitats, such as farm ponds and borrow pits. During the breeding season, the spring peeper will be found near bodies of water that are free of fish and pollutants. During actual breeding, their choruses form near where trees hang by bushy plants or secondary forests. Their choruses can also be located within ponds, marshes, or swamps. They will usually resume call activity during warm rain, and are not commonly seen outside of their breeding choruses. During the non-breeding season, they will inhabit dead plant material from trees, shrubs, and other plants in the woods.

Although they are able to inhabit multiple types of ponds, spring peepers have been seen to be superior competitors in permanent ponds due to their higher caliber of predation resistance within the environment. This amphibious species requires marshes, ponds, or swamp regions to support the aquatic environment the eggs and tadpoles need. Spring peepers have also been shown to act as indicators of wetland health, reflecting levels of anthropogenic disturbance in ecosystems.

In the northern reaches of their range, spring peepers must endure occasional periods of subfreezing temperatures during the breeding season. The species can tolerate the freezing of some of its body fluids, and undergoes hibernation under logs or behind loose bark on trees. It is capable of surviving the freezing of its internal body fluids to temperatures as low as −8 °C (18 °F).

== Home range and territoriality ==
The mating displays of male spring peepers vary with different environmental factors: humidity and vegetation density. These factors play a significant role in the arboreal behavior and nature of spring peepers during mating. At sites with higher humidity and air temperature, there is increased dominance of arboreal behavior, which showcases that latitude may play a role. Spring peepers which reside in areas of warmer temperatures tend to exhibit arboreal behavior to greater extents compared to those in environments of lower temperatures. When comparing the improvement of mating calls in males, calls from above ground compared to those near the ground showcased better results. Local vegetation may also play a role in the betterment of arboreal calling compared to calling from lower levels due to the spatial aspects interrupting the call.

Spring peepers almost always migrate at night. This is most likely to prevent drying out.

== Diet ==
=== Larva (tadpole) ===
Tadpoles are suspension feeders, therefore they graze on inorganic and organic matter. They also feed on algae and other organisms in the water.

=== Adult ===
Spring peepers are nocturnal insectivores, emerging at night to feed primarily on small invertebrates, such as beetles, ants, flies, and spiders. They do not climb high into trees, but hunt in low vegetation. Spring peepers living in deep, damp forests are active hunters both day and night, whereas those found in woodland edges restrict most hunting and other activity to night. The spring peeper's diet involves the filtering of particles from water columns and scouring periphyton and detritus (dead, organic matter) from environmental surfaces in their habitat.

== Reproduction and lifecycle ==
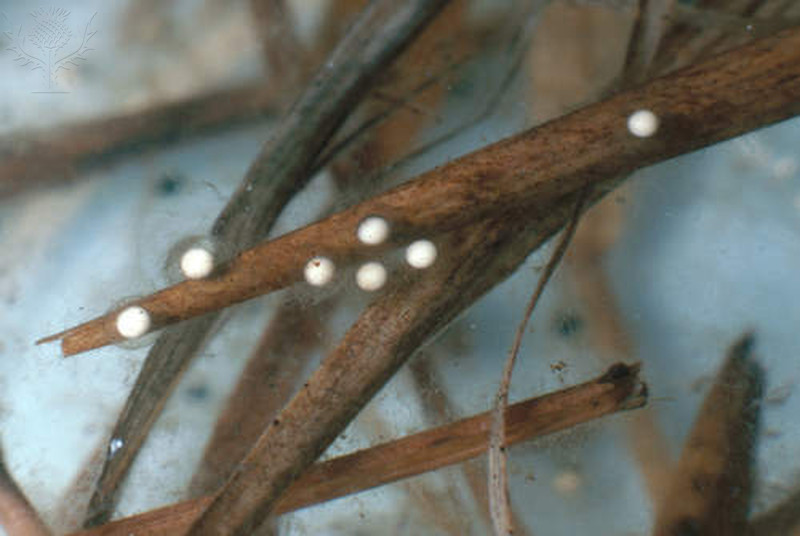
Spring peeper (Pseudacris crucifer) eggs in water

=== Brood size ===
Spring peepers breed in southern areas from October to March, depending on the local temperature. In northern areas, they breed between March and June, when the warm rains start. P. crucifer typically lays around 900 eggs per clutch, but up to 1000 are possible. Females will lay eggs singularly or in groups of two or three. Egg clusters are hidden under vegetation or debris at the water base.

=== Lifespan ===
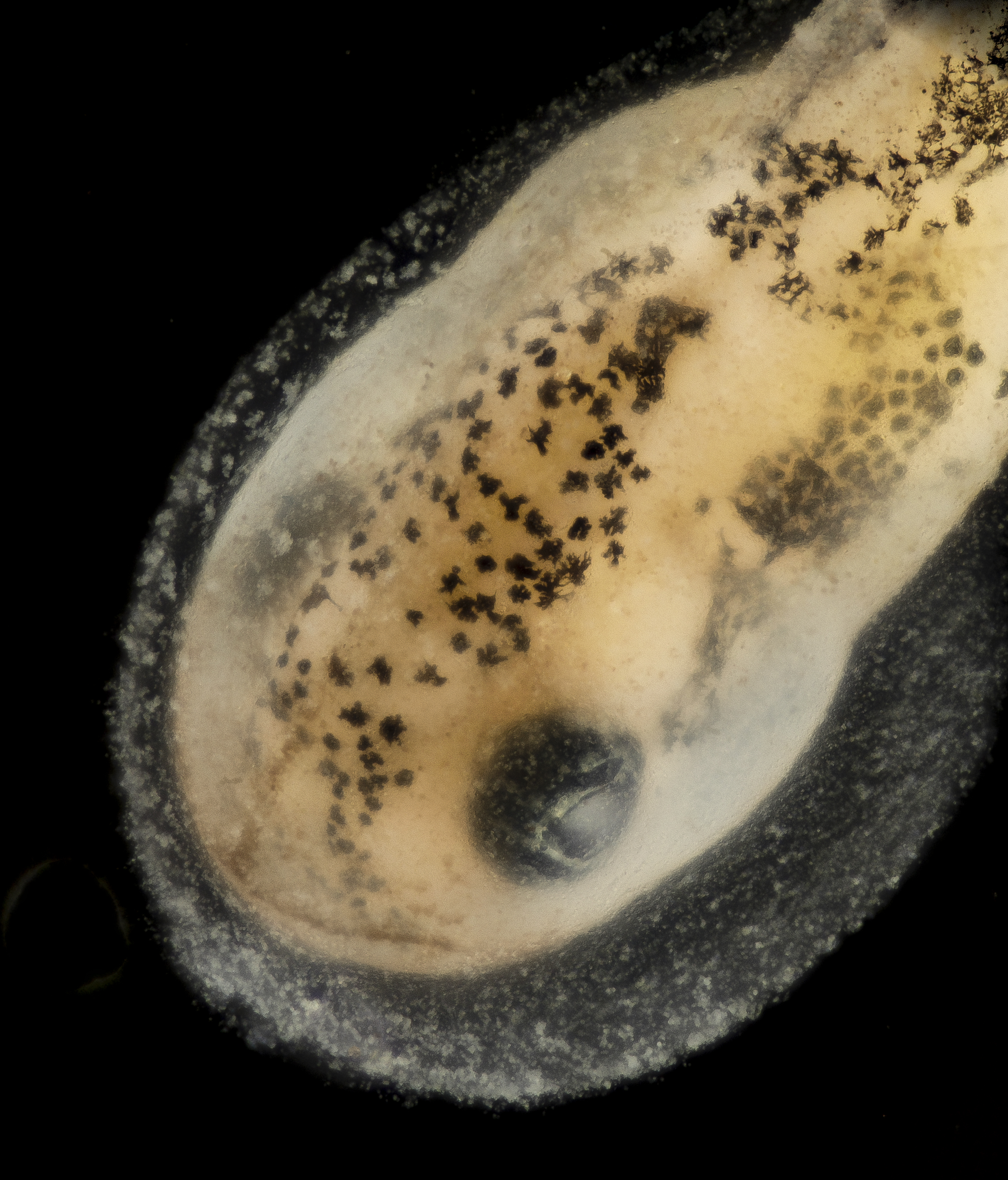
Tadpole 2015-04-16-12.04.26 ZS PMax (16571152244) (2)

After they hatch, they remain tadpoles for two to three months before transforming into frogs and are ready to leave the water. Following breeding in the spring, the spring peepers' larval stage lasts two to three months. The spring peeper can live an estimated three years in the wild.

By looking at the different shading/coloring of concentric rings in the skeletons of spring peepers, age can be determined regarding the way of bone growth. Darker lines coincide with periods of higher survival rates during winter months. Lighter lines and areas represent periods of bone deposition and rapid growth. These lines allow it to be determined that spring peepers begin to breed, going into their third spring when they are two years old. Male spring peepers have reached sexual maturity at this time yet are smaller in size than females. Between spring peepers' second and third years, their body size increases significantly, then subsequently plateaus. During the first season of breeding, the two-year-old males produce higher frequency calls than males in their third and fourth seasons do

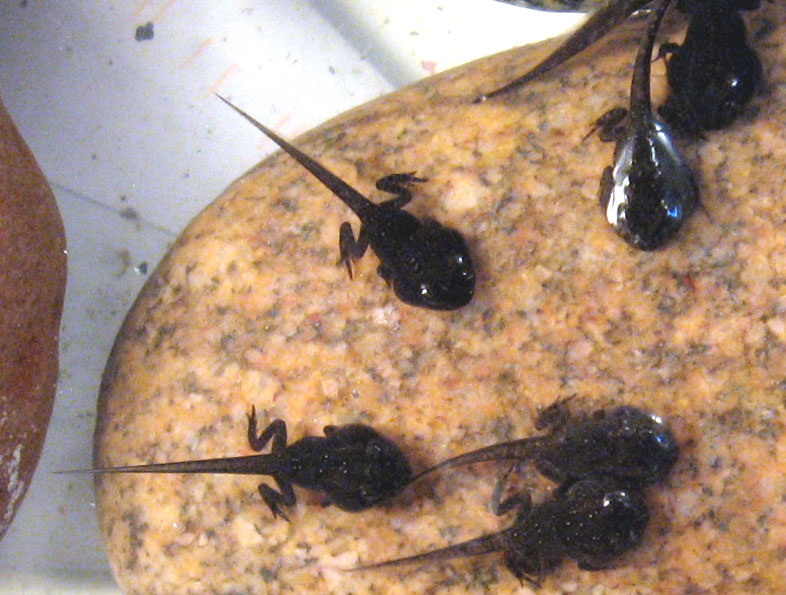
P. c. crucifer tadpoles, about 4–5 weeks old and 24 hours away from complete metamorphosis

== Mating ==
=== Mate searching behavior ===
Single spring peeper calling
The call in relative isolation from others.

Collective spring peepers calling
A few hundred in a single pond.

As their common name implies, the spring peeper has a high-pitched call similar to that of a young chicken, only much louder and rising slightly in tone. They are among the first frogs in the regions to call in the spring. Unlike A. americanus and P. feriarum whose call activity is dependent on seasonality, 63% of variance in P. crucifer call is explained by temperature. Calling rate can be modified by interactions among neighboring males, which tend to alternate calls with one another. The mating calls of the spring peeper consist of a sound very similar to a "peep" and are repeated by males up to 13,500 times per night. As a chorus, they resemble the sounds of sleigh bells. They are heard early in spring not long after the ice melts on the wetlands. The males usually call from the edges of the bodies of water in which they breed, hidden near the bases of shrubs or grasses. Even when calling, they may be difficult to locate and are most easily seen when in amplexus in the shallows. As in other frogs, an aggressive call is made when densities are high. This call is a rising trill closely resembling the breeding call of the southern chorus frog (Pseudacris nigrita nigrita).

=== Female/male interactions ===
==== Courting ====
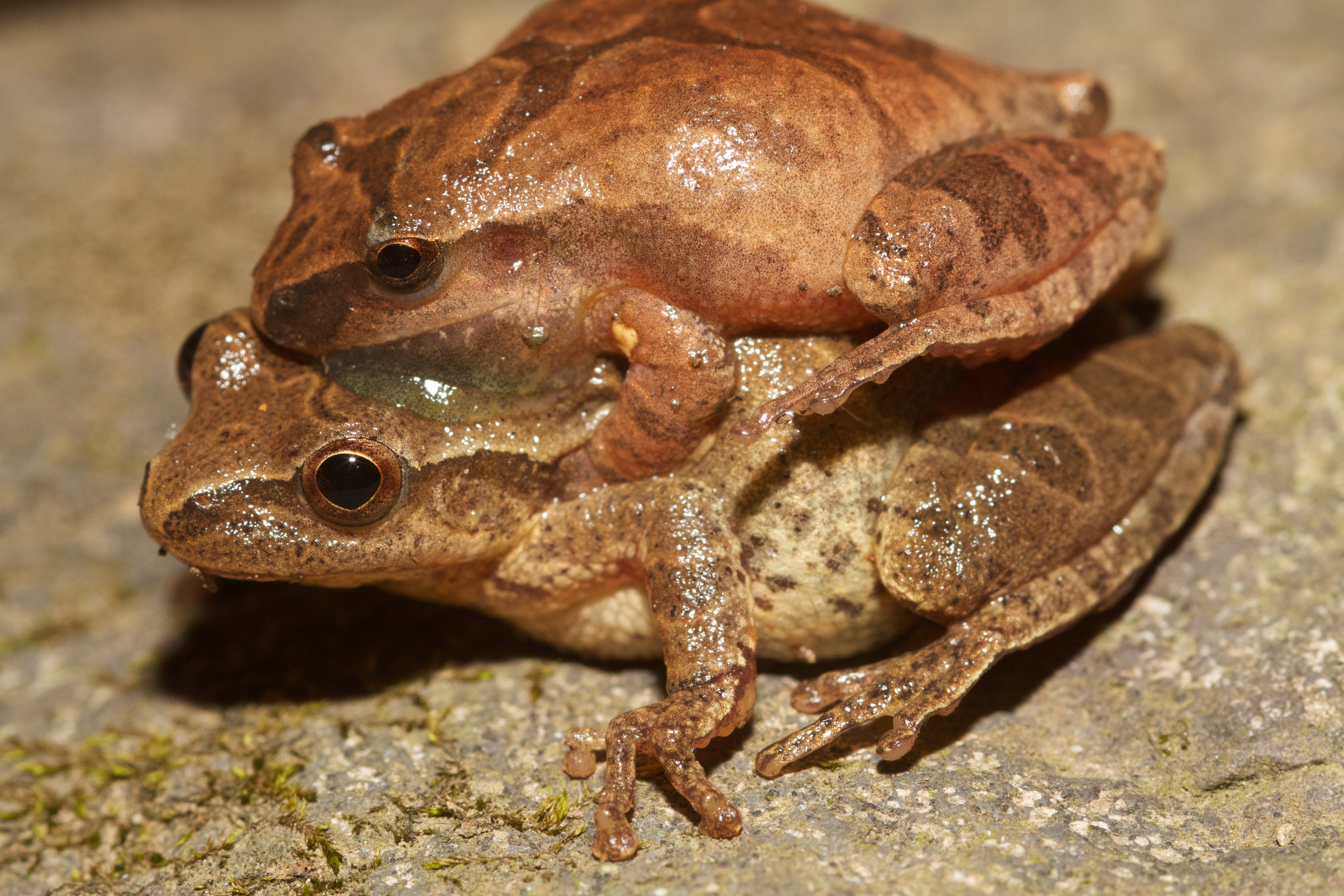
Spring Peeper mating

Females choose mates based on the speed and volume of these male calls. Interestingly, females also discriminate between distinct genetic lineages, with females preferring males of their own lineage, possibly due to the detrimental effects of hybridization. Older, larger males tend to have faster and louder calls that are preferred by the females. A segment of the male population, known as 'satellite males' do not make these calls, but instead position themselves near loud males and attempt to intercept females drawn in by these calls. Males can switch between satellite-ing and calling. The satellite tactic is not associated with size or inferiority. Males normally call between 15 and 25 times per minute to attract mates starting in the evening and continuing through the night. Though only weighing a few grams, the Spring Peeper can produce a call as loud as songbirds that weigh 10–100 times as much. Male spring peepers have also been found to increase the duration and frequency of aggressive calls in response to increased calling intensity from others. These satellite males are also known to circumvent female choice and increase rates of hybridization between spring peeper lineages. Males produce both advertisement calls, long-range calls that signal a male's position to other males and to attract females, and courtship calls, short-range calls that are directed toward nearby females to inform them that the male is ready to mate.

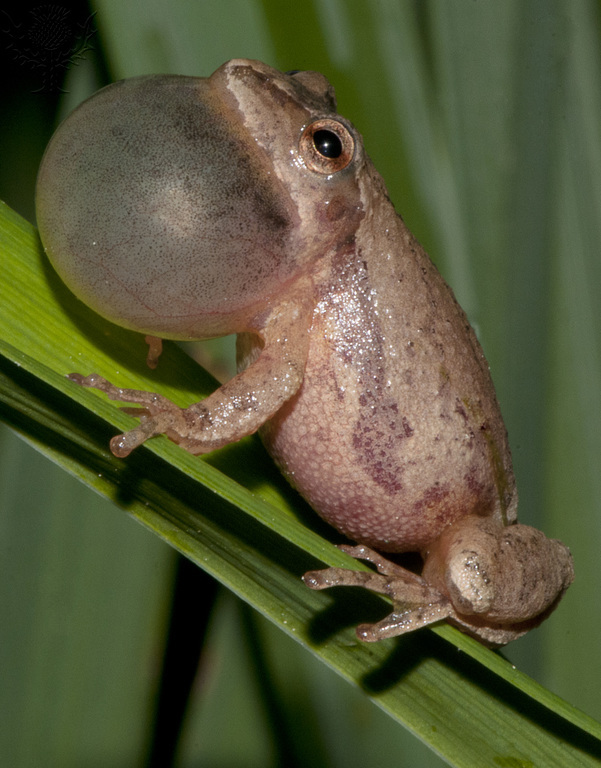
A male, spring peeper with its vocal sac inflated as it performs its mating call

==== Mate choice ====
It has been established that the mating call of male spring peepers acts as an etiological isolating mechanism. As a potential agent of sexual selection, the mating call has many variations that may come into play as a major factor in mate choice by females. During mating, females monitor body size in correlation to the frequency of calls in an inverse matter. The basilar papilla of the inner ear is responsible for decoding and detecting mating calls. The basilar papilla units within the female ear are tuned between 2100 and 3700 Hz and are dependent on intensity. Females tend to select low-frequency calls over high-frequency ones because the calls at the lower end of the spectrum are easier to detect. The calls of spring peepers are often repeated, which has been deemed essential concerning the evolution of the mate choice of females reacting to particular mating and courtship behavior.

== Predation ==
Spring peepers predators include great diving beetle larvae (when in tadpole form), snakes, skunks, and larger frogs.

Drying periods of ponds typically align before or during the metamorphic larval stage of spring peepers due to their slower growth rates. This suggests that higher mortality rates may be an effect. Salamanders and particular kinds of fish are seen to have profound impacts on the survivorship of spring peeper tadpoles. Each type of pond typically hosts different predators: temporary ponds host beetle larvae and dragonflies, intermediate ponds host salamanders and beetle larvae, and permanent ponds host fishes and dragonfly larvae. Each predator plays a role as a potential predator to the spring peeper, depending on which type of pond they inhabit.

Spring peeper larvae are thought to be poor competitors in environments where other anurans are present. This is typically due to the larval spring peepers' small size and lower levels of activity. The small size of the larval allows them to be able to deal with their depressed resource density. Larval spring peepers harvest smaller amounts of resources, resulting in them having lower metabolic costs and a maintained growth rate. Spring peepers are said to occupy locations where predators have previously gotten ridden of bigger competitors.

== Threats and Disease ==
Studies have shown that spring peepers are calling earlier in the season in response to increasing temperatures, indicating sensitivity to climate change. Exposure to glyphosate-based herbicides such as Roundup has been shown to reduce survival in amphibians. Chytrid fungus has been linked to declines in amphibian populations worldwide.

== Conservation status ==
The spring peeper has no special status in most areas. It is common and widespread in the eastern regions. However, its habitats change quickly due to loss of wetlands. In some areas, its populations have decreased significantly. The species is listed as locally threatened in both Iowa and Kansas. Road salt contamination in breeding ponds can reduce amphibian survival and cause developmental abnormalities.

== Taxonomy ==
There are currently two subspecies recognized, although detailed genetic and behavioral analysis demonstrates they likely are not taxonomically accurate:

- The northern, P. c. crucifer, found all over the eastern United States and eastern Canada.
- The southern, P. c. bartramiana. The southern is distinguished by a strong dark marking on its belly. P. c. bartramiana is found along the southern Gulf Coast from southeastern Texas to northern Florida and southern Georgia.
