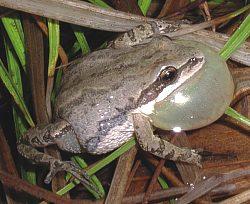

Conservation status
- Least Concern (IUCN 3.1)

Scientific classification
- Kingdom: Animalia
- Phylum: Chordata
- Class: Amphibia
- Order: Anura
- Family: Hylidae
- Genus: Pseudacris
- Species: P. triseriata

Binomial name
- Pseudacris triseriata Wied-Neuwied, 1838
- Range of P. triseriata

Synonyms
- Hyla triseriata Helocaetes triseriatus Chorophilus triseriatus Chorophilus nigritus triseriatus

= Western chorus frog =

Species of amphibian

The western chorus frog (Pseudacris triseriata), also known as striped chorus frog, or midland chorus frog is a species of frog found in Canada and the United States.

== Description ==
Western chorus frogs are small 40 mm (1.6 in), smooth skinned, and greenish-grey, reddish, olive, or brown in color. Differences in color can occur locally and should not be confused for range-specific populations. Typically, these frogs have three dark-brown or grey stripes which extend down the entire dorsal side. The dorsal stripes can be broken up, reduced, or even absent in certain specimens. The white or cream-colored underside or ventral side of the frog typically has dark, scattered flecks. A single white stripe runs along the upper lip, and a heavy dark stripe runs across the eye and along each side from the snout to the leg. A dark triangular spot on the head may also be seen in some individuals. These frogs have small, round toes without pads and very little webbing between each toe.

Typically, males are smaller than females, and can be told apart from the females by their yellow vocal sacs when calling. When not calling, this sac looks like a dark, loose flap of skin beneath the throat.

Tadpoles of the western chorus frog have gray or brown bodies. Their body shape is round with clear tail fins and dark flecks. The intestinal coil reportedly can be seen through the belly skin if closely observed. Their lips are black.

== Taxonomy ==
P. triseriata was once considered a subspecies of the southern chorus frog, P. nigrita, but was reclassified as its own species with four subspecies: P. t. triseriata, P. t. kalmi, P. t. maculata, and P. t. feriarum. These have since been granted species status, meaning P. triseriata as described here has no subspecies.

== Distribution ==
This chorus frog has a huge distribution, from Canada to the Gulf of Mexico, and New Jersey to central Arizona. The frogs lives from near sea level to about 12,000 ft (3,700 m) above sea level, and are capable of surviving temperatures as low as –8 °C.

== Habitat ==
Western chorus frogs live in a variety of different habitats, but areas of more permanent water increase the risk of predation on eggs and/or tadpoles. To compensate for this, chorus frogs stick to mostly ephemeral freshwater areas, such as marshes, river swamps, meadows, grassy pools, and other open areas found in mountains and prairies. The western chorus frog remains close to these ephemeral aquatic habitats, since they provide excellent mating, breeding, and hibernation grounds. Since these areas tend to dry out, these frogs can be, but are less commonly, found in fallowed agricultural fields, damp woodlands, roadside ditches, and wooded swamps.

== Behavior ==
Both males and sometimes females call in large choruses. Males use a special call to attract several potential mates to breeding sites. The western chorus frog call can be heard from half a mile away. The call is a very distinct "cree-ee-ee—eeek", but can be confused with the upland chorus frog. Calling can occur for 0.5–2.0 seconds and can occur 18–20 times in a minute. The higher the temperature, the more frequent calls occur in a minute, (30–90 calls per minute). The western chorus frog relies heavily on secrecy to keep themselves safe from predators. Any disturbances to the frog's environment causes them to stop calling and dive into the depths of whatever water source they reside near, under leaf litter, logs, rocks, or loose soil, for minutes. These terrestrial hiding spots serve not only as hiding places, but also as hibernation places for the frogs during the winter.

== Diet ==
The diet of an adult consists of small invertebrates and arthropods, such as small flies, mosquitoes, ants, small beetles, moths and caterpillars, grasshoppers, and spiders, only if they are small enough. Froglets (the transition or metamorphic phase between tadpole and frog) will feed on smaller prey, such as mites, midges, and springtails. Tadpoles feed on periphyton, filamentous algae, diatoms, and pollen in or on the surface of the water. They will scavenge if given the opportunity.

== Reproduction ==
Breeding occurs at different times throughout the various states where this frog resides. Typically, western chorus frog's breeding season starts in March through May, with April being the most active month. However, breeding takes place earlier in southern parts and can vary through the frogs entire range. The earliest sign of western chorus frog breeding occurs with choruses heard on sunny days. Males call to potential females over the course of several days to months. As the season continues, these competing male choruses move to the evenings and cloudy, rainy days. The lifespan of these frogs averages five years. After mating has occurred, females can lay between 500 and 1500 eggs during the entire breeding season. The female lays one cluster at a time, which can contain 20–300 eggs. The eggs are retained in a loose, gelatinous cluster, submerged below the water and stuck to weeds or grasses found along the edges of shallow ponds, flooded swales, roadside ditches, flooded fields, open areas, and swamps. The eggs will hatch into tadpoles between three and 14 days after being laid. However, water temperature can be a limiting factor in the growth of both eggs and tadpoles. Colder water temperatures prevent the tadpoles and eggs from growing. Tadpoles metamorphose into froglets 40–90 days afterwards.

== Conservation and ecology ==
Although quite adaptable and tolerant to human activity, western chorus frog populations are declining in certain areas. Labeled as in least concern on the IUCN list, the US Federal List has the species labeled as no special status. In Canada, the western chorus frog is listed as threatened in the Great Lakes/St. Lawrence - Canadian Shield under the Species at Risk Act (SARA). The western chorus frog is currently the subject of a legal dispute over compensation between a landowner and the Government of Canada.

The western chorus frog plays an important role as an indicator species. Deformities, reduction in reproductive success, or changes in morphology in either the larval or adult forms could indicate pollution or toxic substances in the environment, sometimes trematodes. Therefore, the health of these frogs are valuable in determining the health of ecosystems and whether agricultural practices have leaked any pesticides, herbicides, or fertilizers into the environment.
