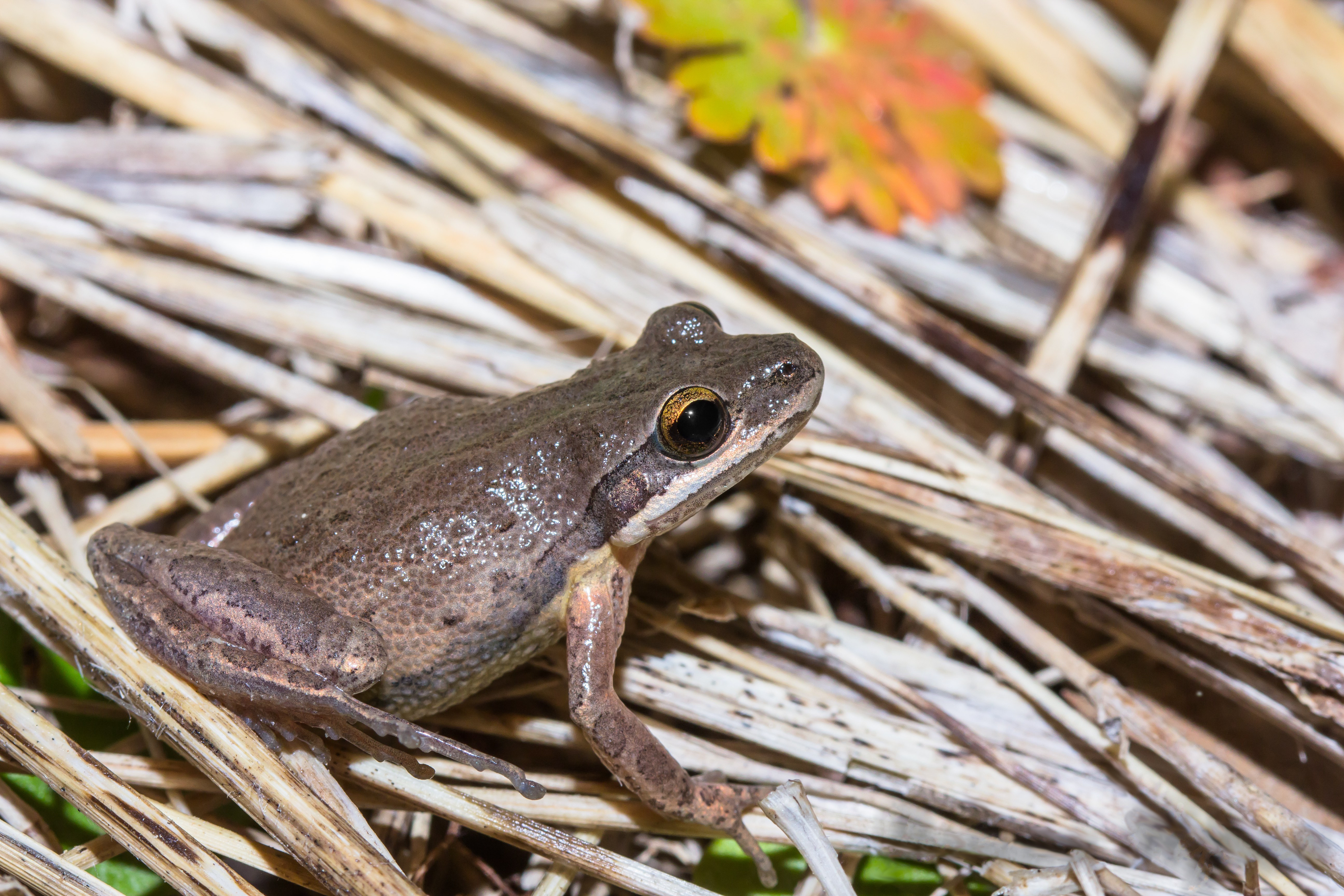

Conservation status
- Least Concern (IUCN 3.1)

Scientific classification
- Kingdom: Animalia
- Phylum: Chordata
- Class: Amphibia
- Order: Anura
- Family: Hylidae
- Genus: Pseudacris
- Species: P. fouquettei

Binomial name
- Pseudacris fouquettei Lemmon, et al., 2008

= Pseudacris fouquettei =

Cajun chorus frog

Species of amphibian

Cajun chorus frog (Pseudacris fouquettei) is a species of chorus frog found in the south-eastern United States. It was recently separated from similar species, Pseudacris feriarum.

== Description ==
The Cajun chorus frog can be tan or brown and has narrow dark dorsal stripes that are often broken into a series of dashes or spots. It has a gray stripe that extends from its snout down each sides to its groin. It has a dark spot between its eyes that may appear triangular. The belly is white or pale.

Adults of this species can grow to be a maximum of 30mm (1.1in) in males and a minimum of 27mm (1in) in females.

It is sexually dimorphic with the females being larger than males. During breeding season, the males having dark throats.

The Cajun chorus frog is similar in morphology to other Pseudacris species, being distinguished by genetics, habitat range and advertisement call. The epithet fouquetti is a tribute to a Pseudacris researcher the 1960s and 1970s, Arizona State professor Martin J. Fouquette Jr.

== Distribution ==
P. fouquettei is found in the southern United States, in Louisiana, Arkansas, Oklahoma, Mississippi and Texas.
