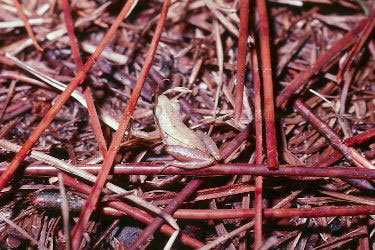
- Pseudacris ocularis, little grass frog

Scientific classification
- Kingdom: Animalia
- Phylum: Chordata
- Class: Amphibia
- Order: Anura
- Family: Hylidae
- Subfamily: Acrisinae
- Genus: Pseudacris; Fitzinger, 1843

Synonyms
- Chorophilus Baird, 1854; Helocaetes Baird, 1854; Heloecetes Baird, 1859 (misspelling Hyliola Mocquard, 1899; Limnaoedus Mittleman & List, 1953; Parapseudacris Hardy & Burrows, 1986; Pseudacris (Pycnacris) Fouquette & Dubois, 2014

= Chorus frog =

Genus of amphibians

Pseudacris (commonly known as the chorus frogs) is a genus of frogs in the family Hylidae found in North America ranging from the Pacific coastline to the Atlantic.

The name of the genus presumably comes from the Greek pseudes (false) and akris (locust), probably a reference to the repeated rasping trill of most chorus frogs, which is similar to that of the insect. It could also mean ‘false Acris’, distinguishing it from another frog genus.

== Taxonomy ==
The species in this genus are disputed. Molecular genetic research shows little consistency due to hybridization between species, making taxonomic organization difficult.

The number of species in this genus is controversial, but Frost et al. list 19 species (all shown here), and AmphibiaWeb lists 17 species (P. hypochondriaca and P. sierra are not recognized).

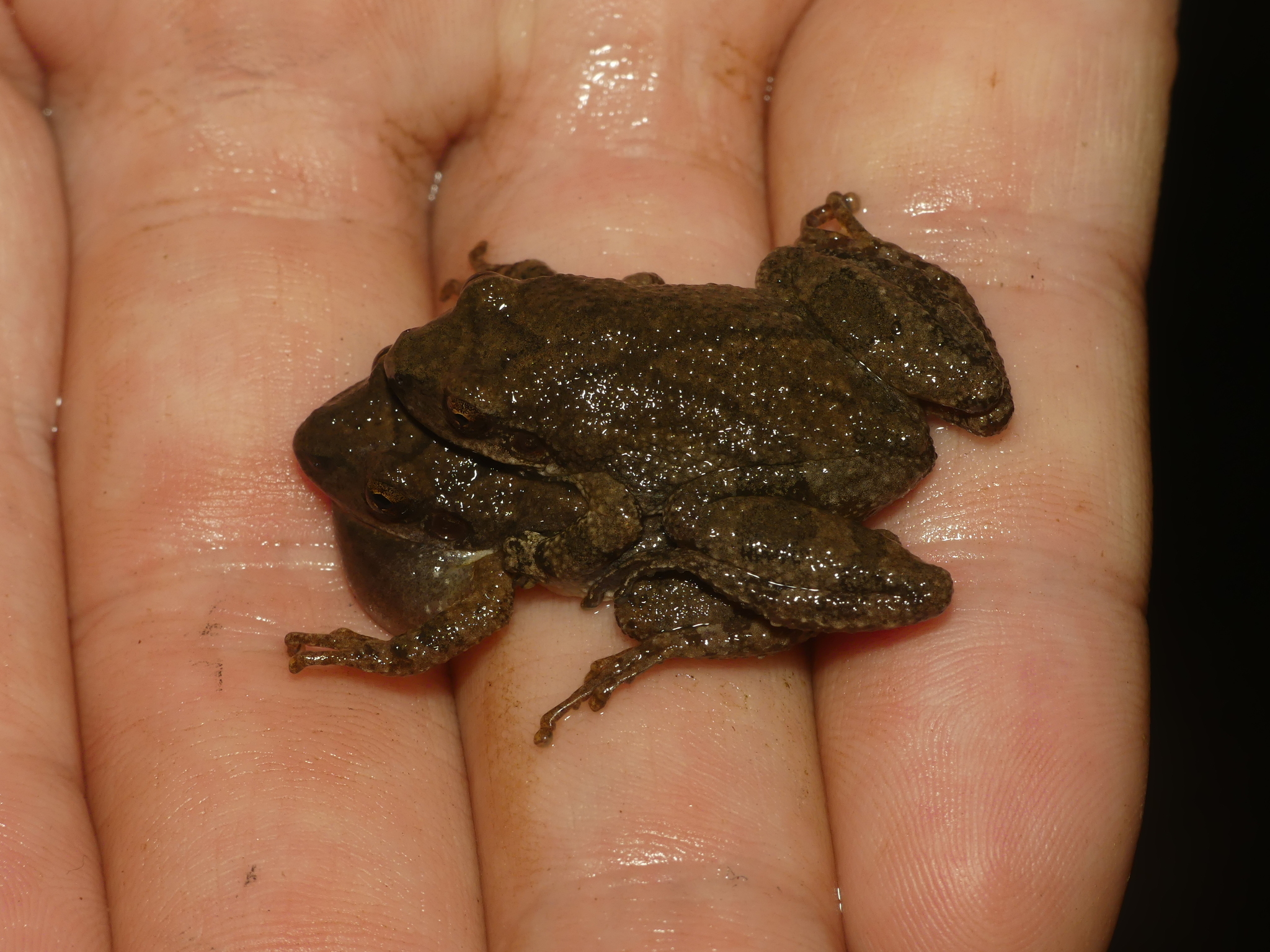
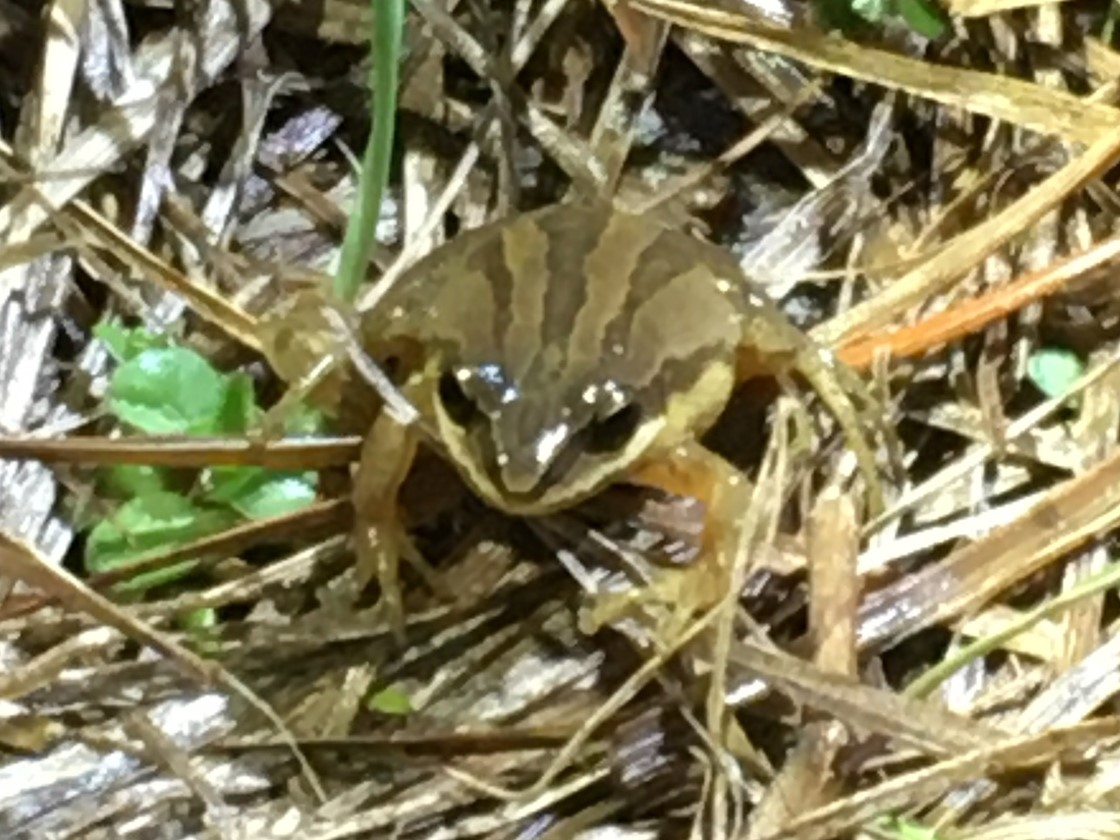
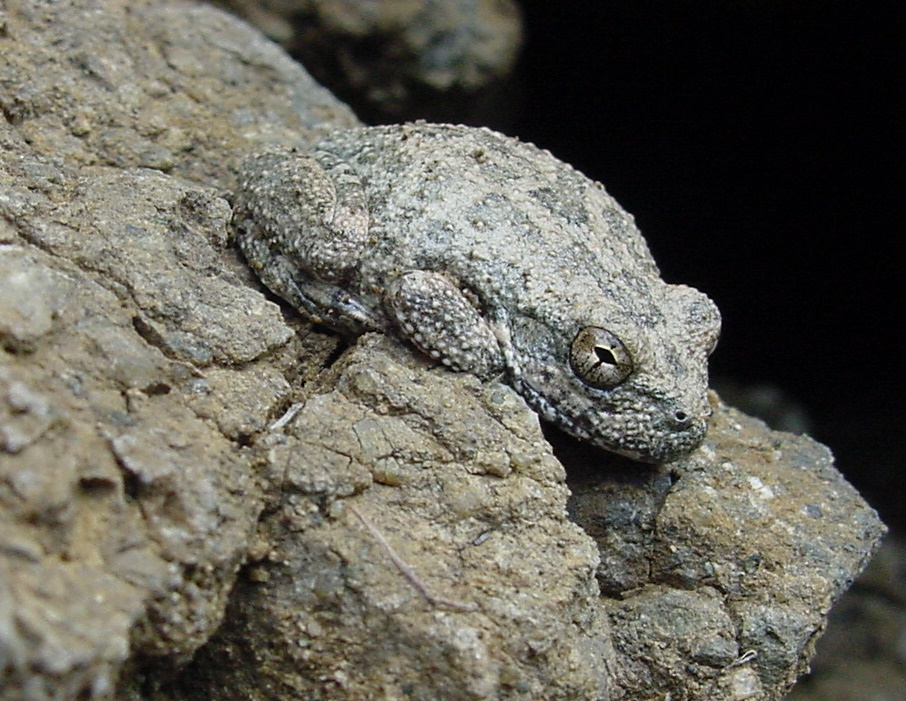
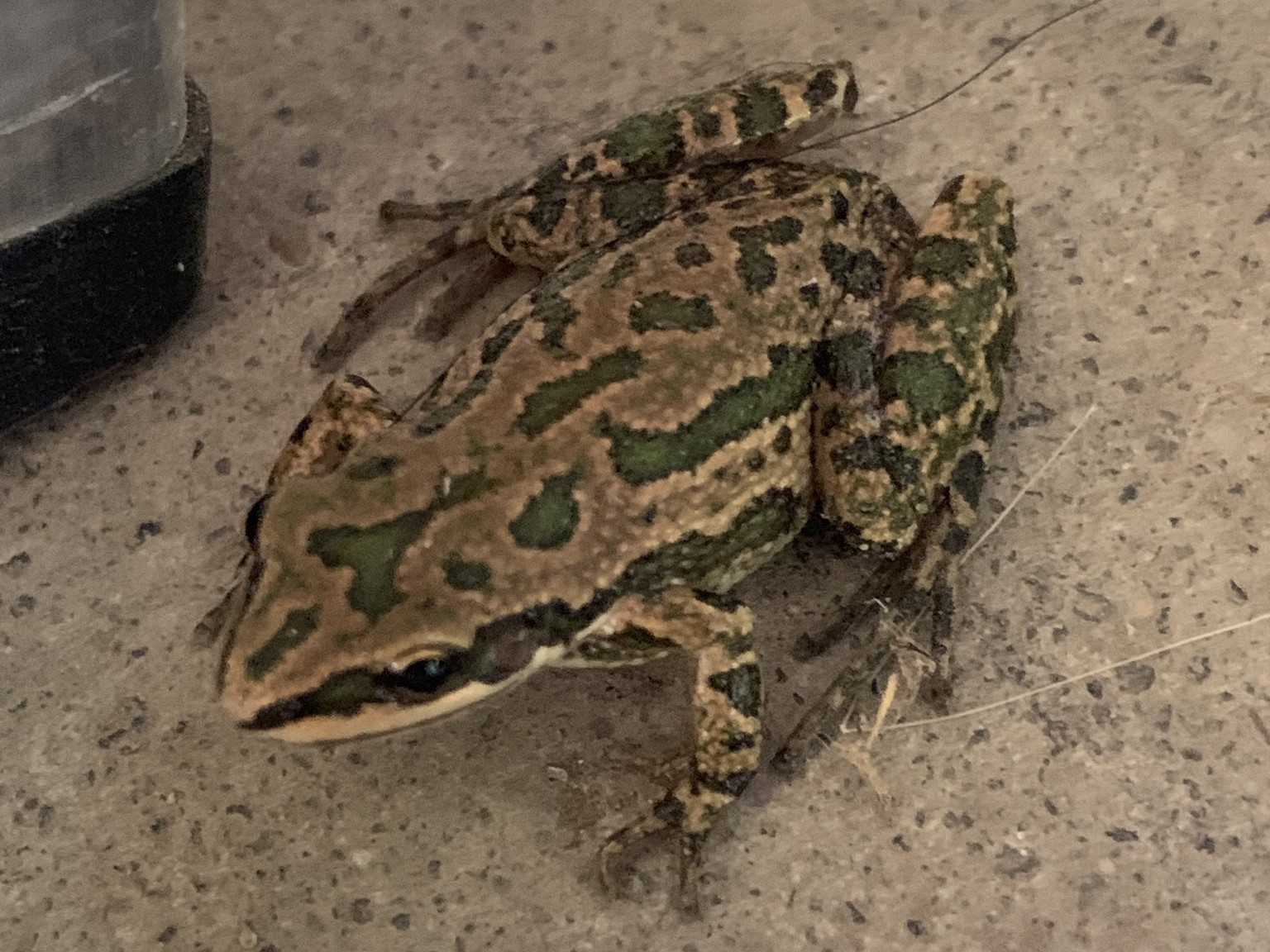
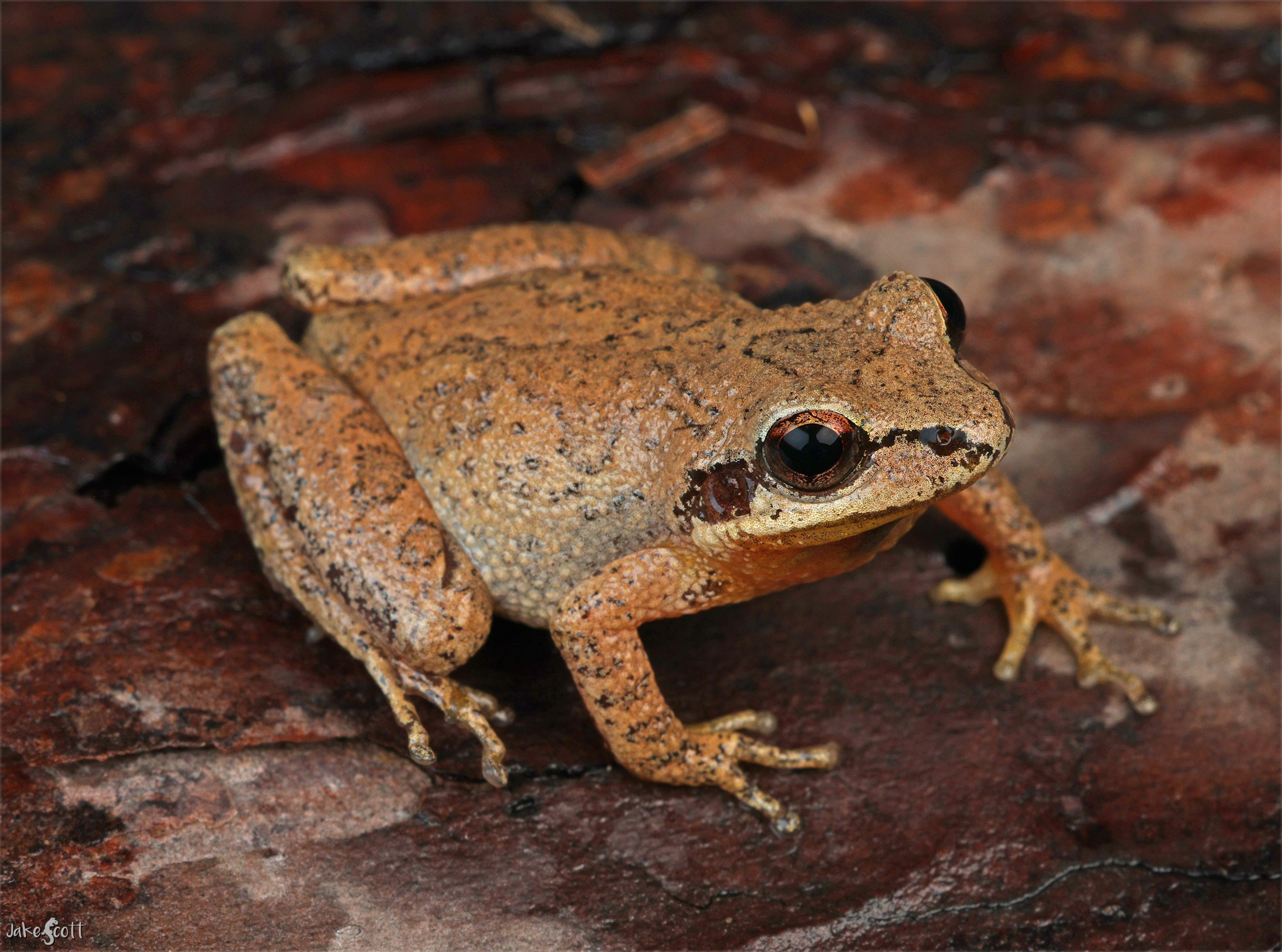
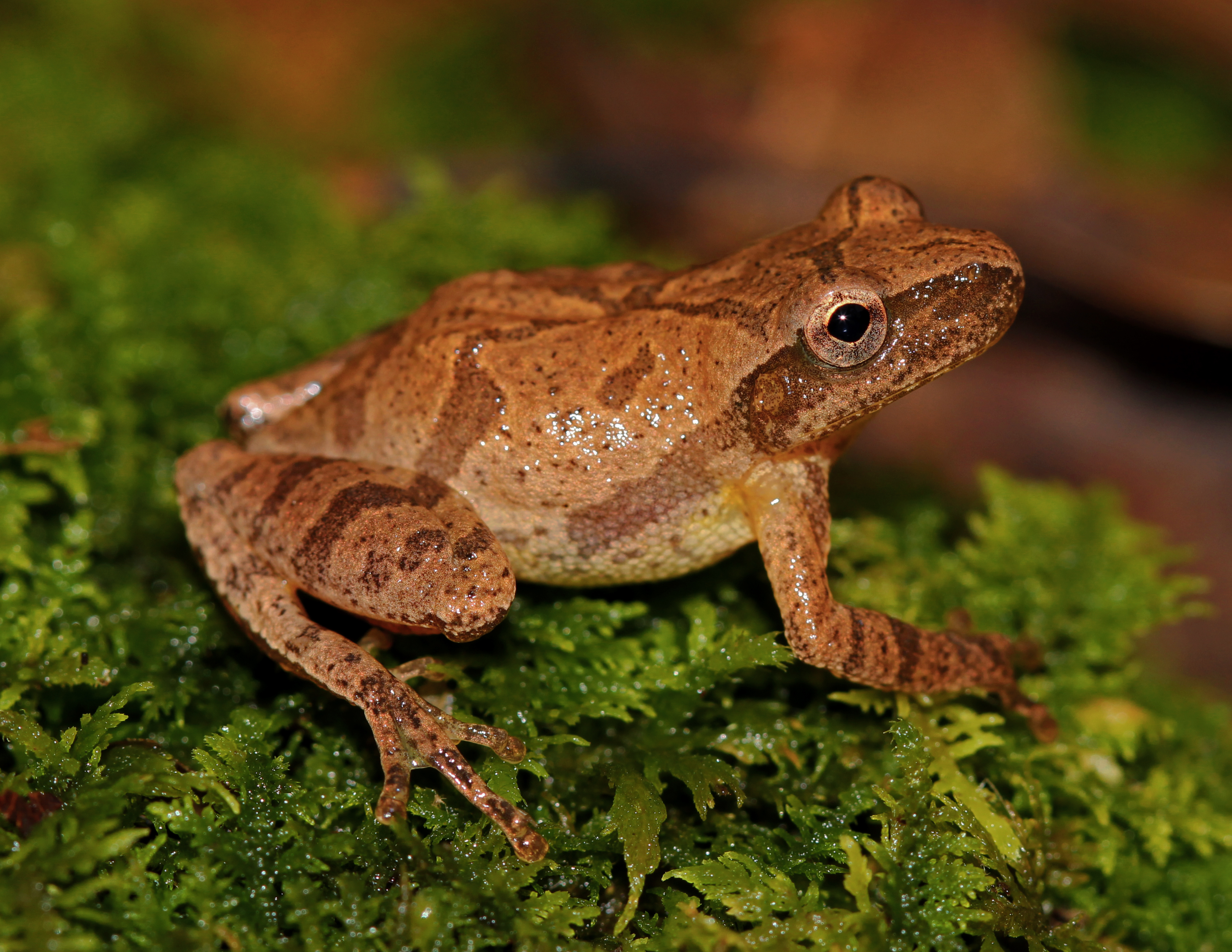
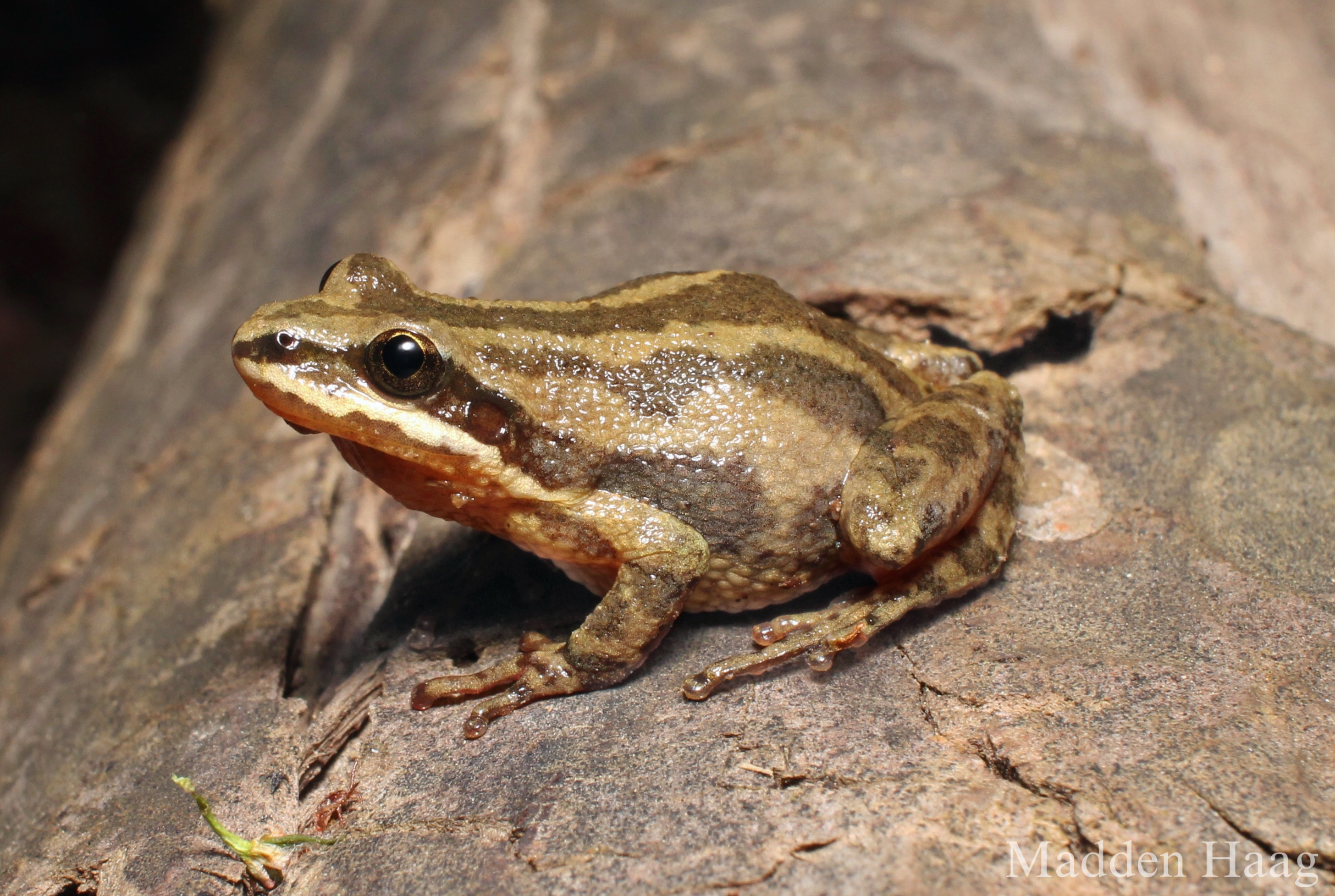
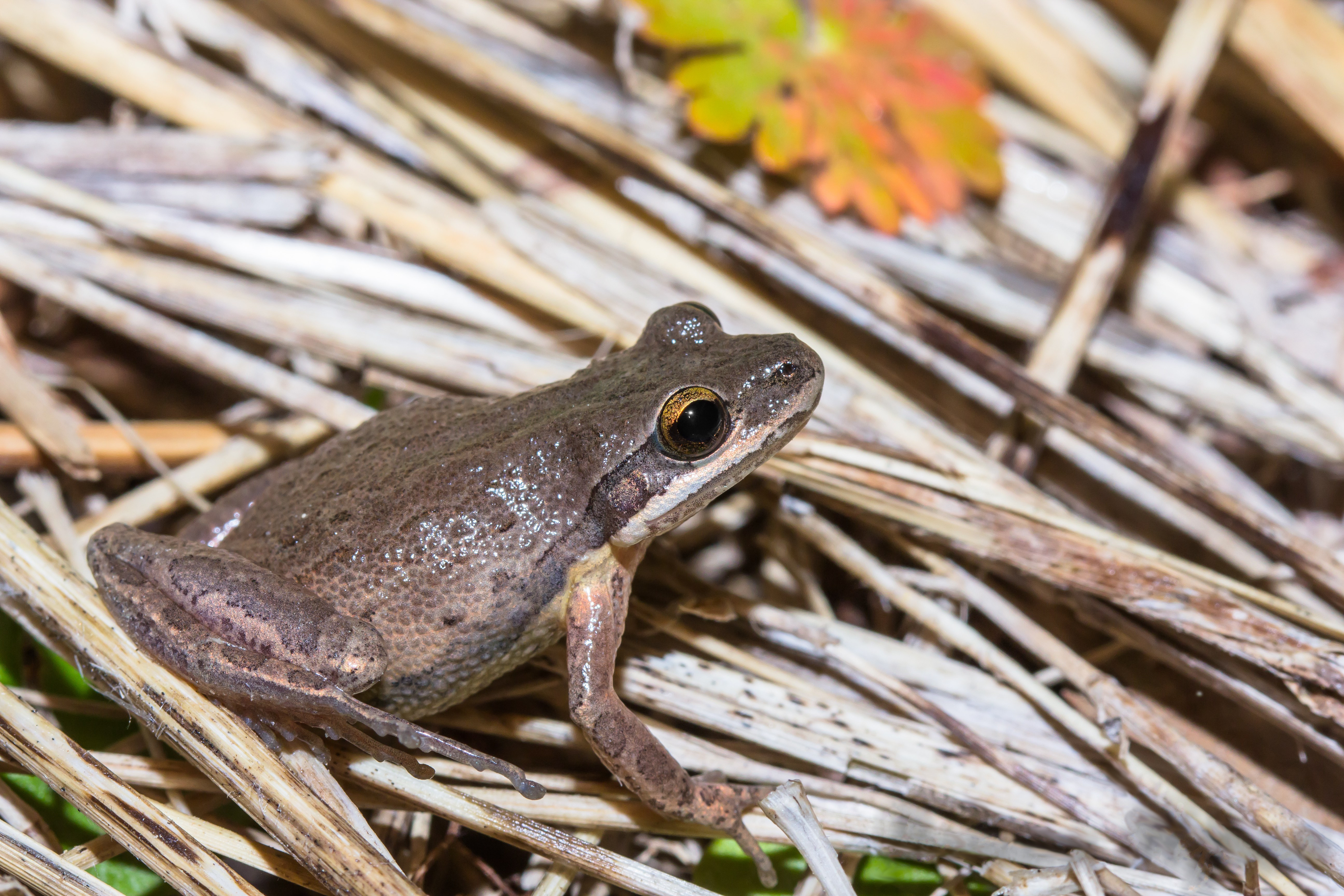
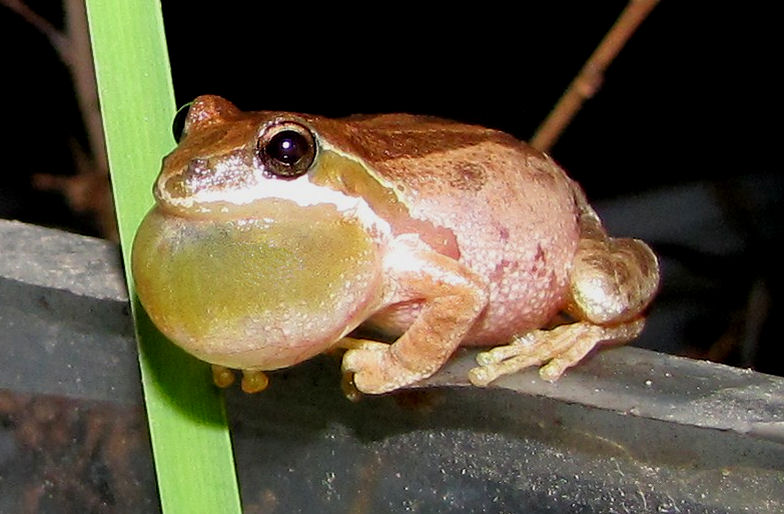
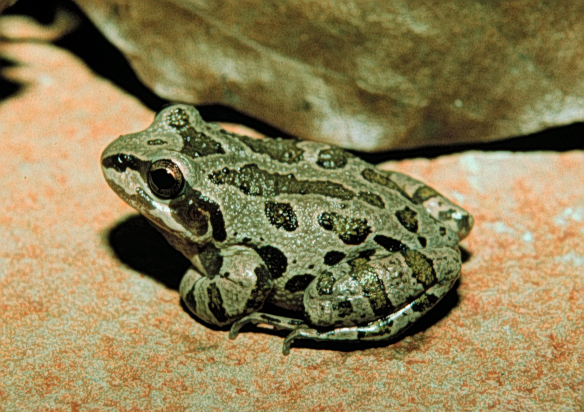
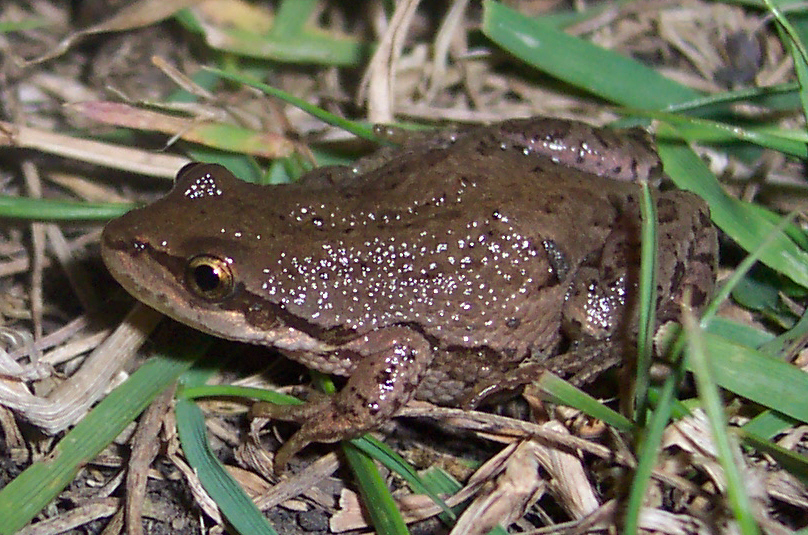
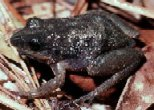
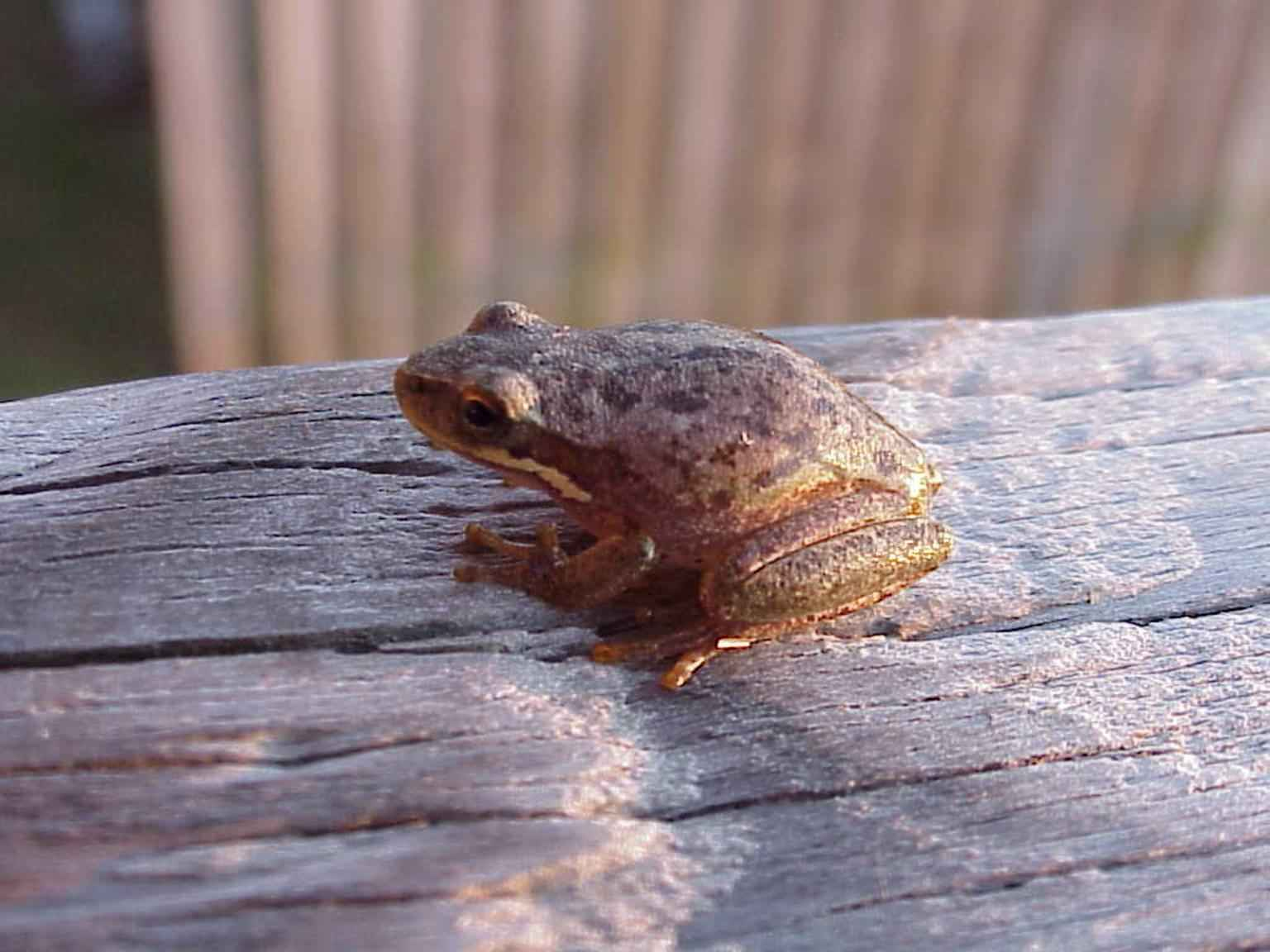
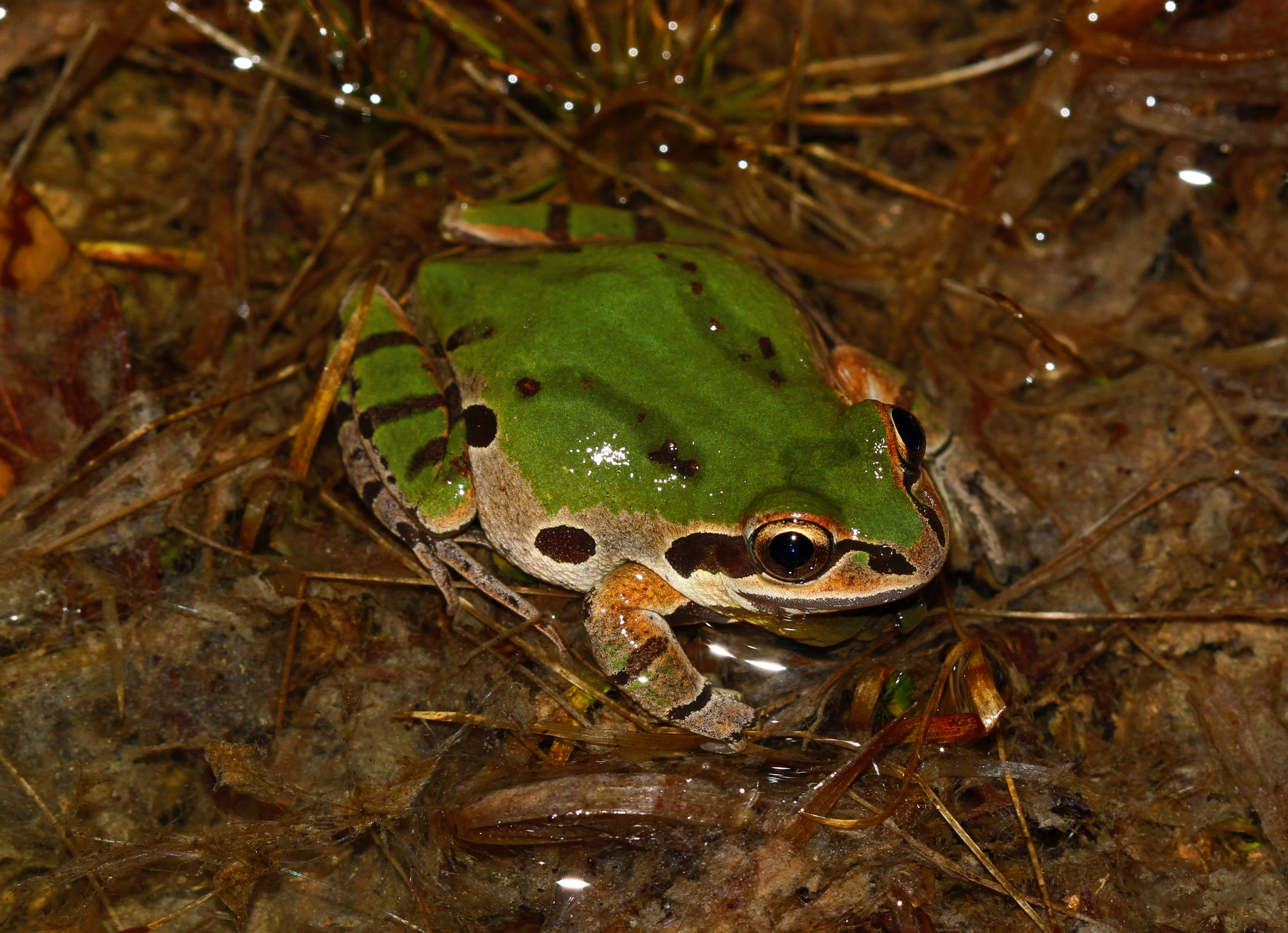
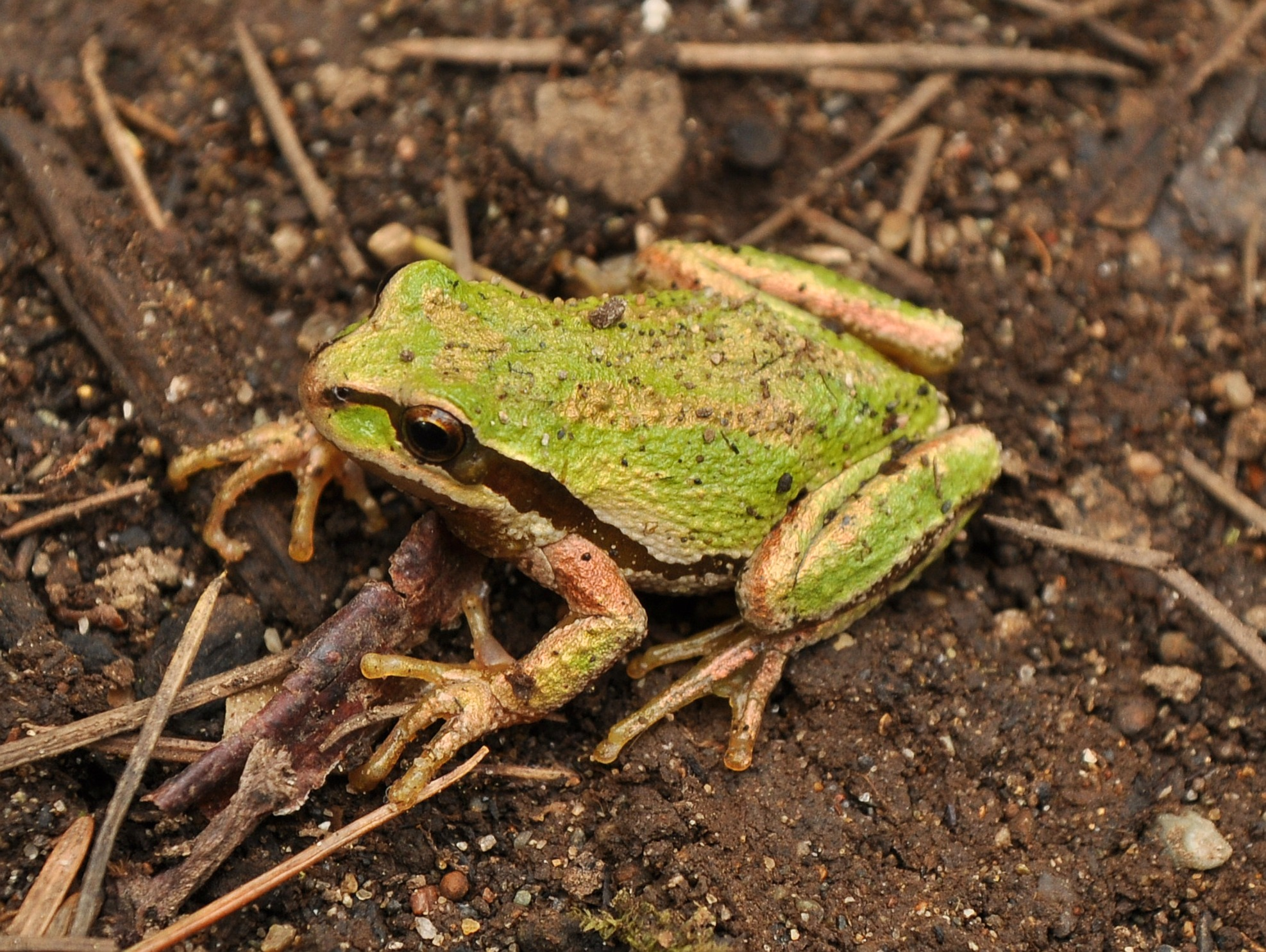
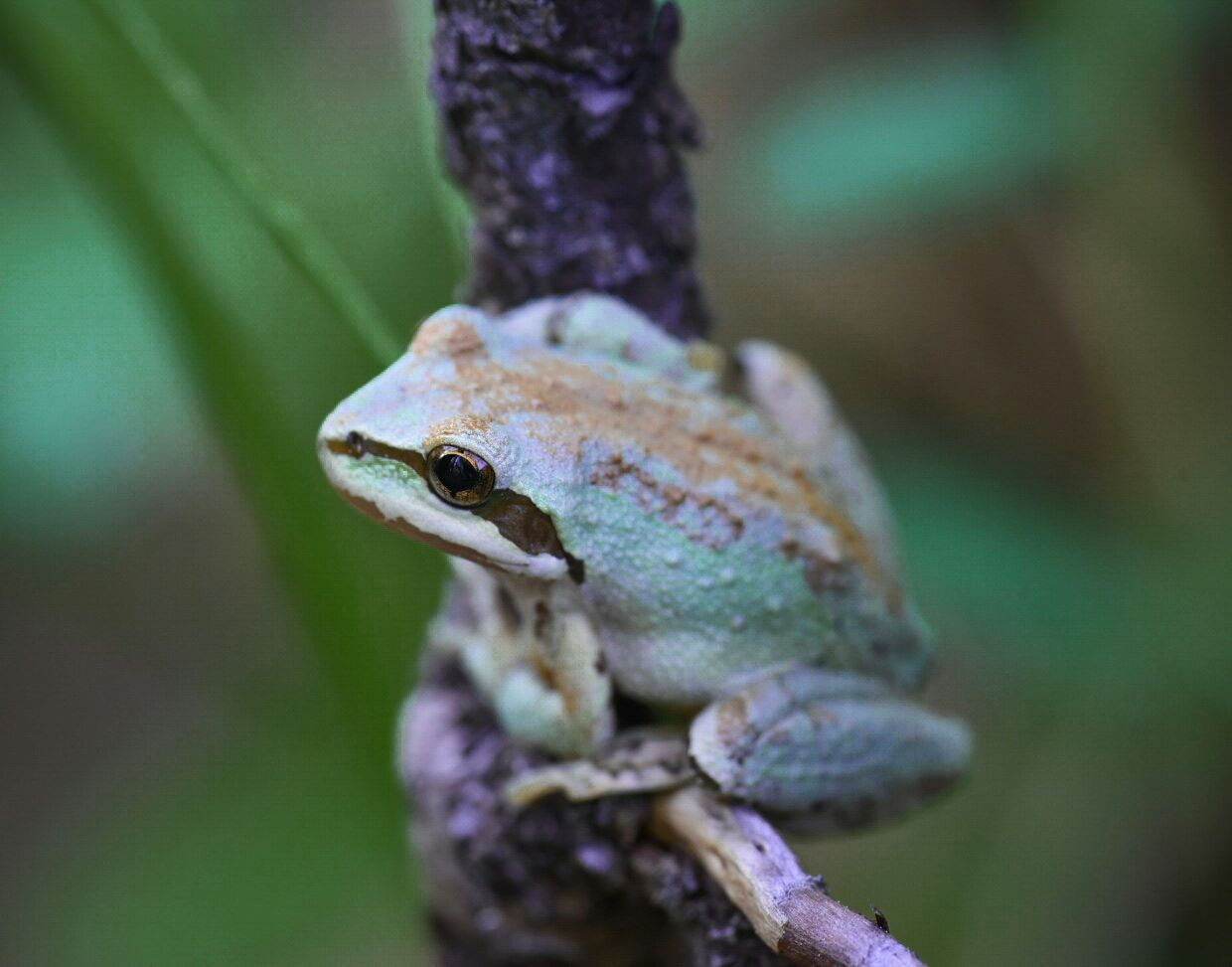
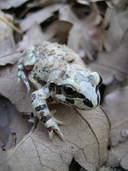
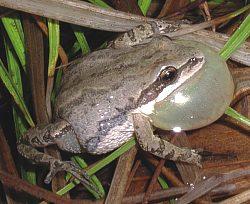
Image	Binomial name and author	Common name	Distribution
	Pseudacris brachyphona (Cope, 1889)	Appalachian mountain chorus frog	southwestern Pennsylvania, western Maryland, southeastern Ohio, eastern Kentucky, West Virginia, eastern Tennessee, and northern Alabama
	Pseudacris brimleyi Brandt & Walker, 1933	Brimley's chorus frog	Atlantic Coastal Plain from northeastern Georgia to southern Caroline County, Virginia
	Pseudacris cadaverina (Cope, 1866)	California tree frog	southern California (USA) and Baja California (Mexico)
	Pseudacris clarkii (Baird, 1854)	spotted chorus frog	central Kansas, Oklahoma, and northeastern New Mexico to the Gulf of Mexico and Rio Grande valley in Texas and Tamaulipas
	Pseudacris collinsorum Ospina, Tieu, Apodaca & Lemmon, 2020	Collinses’ mountain chorus frog	southwestern North Carolina/southeastern Tennessee, south through northern Georgia to most of Alabama aside from the north and west to northeastern Mississippi
	Pseudacris crucifer (Wied-Neuwied, 1838)	spring peeper	Gulf Coast from southeastern Texas to southeastern Georgia and northern Florida, United States.
	Pseudacris feriarum (Baird, 1854)	upland chorus frog	New Jersey to the Florida panhandle; west to eastern Texas and southeast Oklahoma
	Pseudacris fouquettei Lemmon et al., 2008	Cajun chorus frog	United States, in Louisiana, Arkansas, Oklahoma, Mississippi and Texas
	Pseudacris hypochondriaca (Hallowell, 1854)	Baja chorus frog	Western North America
	Pseudacris illinoensis Smith, 1951	Illinois chorus frog	Arkansas, Illinois, and Missouri.
	Pseudacris kalmi Harper, 1955	New Jersey chorus frog	New Jersey
	Pseudacris maculata (Agassiz, 1850)	boreal chorus frog	Canada from central Quebec to eastern British Columbia and north to the Northwest Territories, USA throughout Montana, northwestern Wisconsin, northeastern Arizona, northern New Mexico, and southwestern Utah.
	Pseudacris nigrita (Le Conte, 1825)	southern chorus frog	southeastern United States
	Pseudacris ocularis (Holbrook, 1838)	little grass frog	Southeastern United States
	Pseudacris ornata (Holbrook, 1836)	ornate chorus frog	Southeastern United States.
	Pseudacris regilla (Baird & Girard, 1852)	Pacific tree frog	Pacific Northwest, from Northern California, Oregon, and Washington to British Columbia in Canada
	Pseudacris sierra (Jameson, Mackey, & Richmond, 1966)	Sierran chorus frog	California, Idaho, Oregon, Nevada, and Montana
	Pseudacris streckeri A. A. Wright & A. H. Wright, 1933	Strecker's chorus frog	south central United States, from southern Kansas, through Oklahoma and east to Arkansas, the northwestern tip of Louisiana and south throughout much of Texas.
	Pseudacris triseriata (Wied-Neuwied, 1838)	western chorus frog or striped chorus frog	Canada to the Gulf of Mexico, and New Jersey to central Arizona.

== Distribution and habitat ==
Chorus frogs live anywhere in North America from southern Alaska to southern Baja California, and from the Pacific to the Atlantic.
