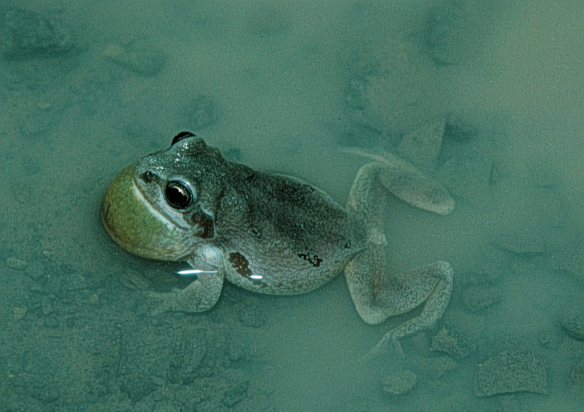

Conservation status
- Least Concern (IUCN 3.1)

Scientific classification
- Kingdom: Animalia
- Phylum: Chordata
- Class: Amphibia
- Order: Anura
- Family: Hylidae
- Genus: Pseudacris
- Species: P. streckeri

Binomial name
- Pseudacris streckeri A. A. Wright & A. H. Wright, 1933

Synonyms
- Hyla streckeri

= Strecker's chorus frog =

Species of amphibian

Strecker's chorus frog (Pseudacris streckeri) is a species of nocturnal tree frog native to the south central United States, from southern Kansas, through Oklahoma and east to Arkansas, the northwestern tip of Louisiana and south throughout much of Texas.

== Description ==
Strecker's chorus frogs can attain a size of approximately 1.5 inches (about 3.5 cm). They vary in color from light grey, brown to green with darker longitudinal blotches, and a distinctive dark spot that runs underneath the eye. Their underside is typically white in color, with yellow or orange around the groin region.

Whether this name refers to a species with two subspecies: Strecker's chorus frog, Pseudacris streckeri streckeri Wright & Wright, 1933 and Illinois chorus frog, Pseudacris streckeri illinoensis (Smith, 1951), or whether the Illinois chorus frog is split off as its own species is controversial. Collins recognized it as its own species which was followed by ASW6.0 and Amphibiaweb on the basis of its diagnosability from Pseudacris streckeri and its allopatry. The IUCNredlist 2013.2 has not incorporated this taxonomic split.
