= Pseudacris kalmi =

New Jersey chorus frog

Conservation status
- Least Concern (IUCN 3.1)

Scientific classification
- Kingdom: Animalia
- Phylum: Chordata
- Class: Amphibia
- Order: Anura
- Family: Hylidae
- Genus: Pseudacris
- Species: P. kalmi

Binomial name
- Pseudacris kalmi Harper, 1955

Synonyms
- Pseudacris triseriata kalmi Harper, 1955

Species of amphibian

Pseudacris kalmi, the New Jersey chorus frog, is a species of frog in the treefrog family Hylidae. It is found in the states near New Jersey in the United States. It was first described as subspecies of Pseudacris triseriata but it is differentiated by range and size. This frog's color ranges from grey to tan or greenish brown with a dark stripe on both sides of the body that extends from the snout, through their eyes, and to the groin. It breeds in early spring from February to April. It broods in shallow bodies of water, especially vernal pools, which dry up later in the season.

The adult frog measures 19–36 mm in snout-vent length. It has one stripe that goes from over the mouth to under each eye and three thick stripes over its back from front to back. Sometimes the middle stripe is broken.

In breeding seasons, the male frogs seek vernal pools. They sit in the water or on plants and sing for the females, who come to them. The female frog lays eggs on the stems of plants in shallow water. The eggs stick together in groups of 8 to 143. The tadpoles take about two months to become frogs.

This frog's predators include water snakes, foxes, birds, raccoons, and such arthropods as crayfish and spiders.

Scientists named this frog kalmi for Pehr Kalm, also called Peter Kalm, a Swedish traveler who wrote a book called Travels into North America in 1772. In that book, he discussed Niagara Falls, other natural features of the area, and the many frogs of New Jersey.
