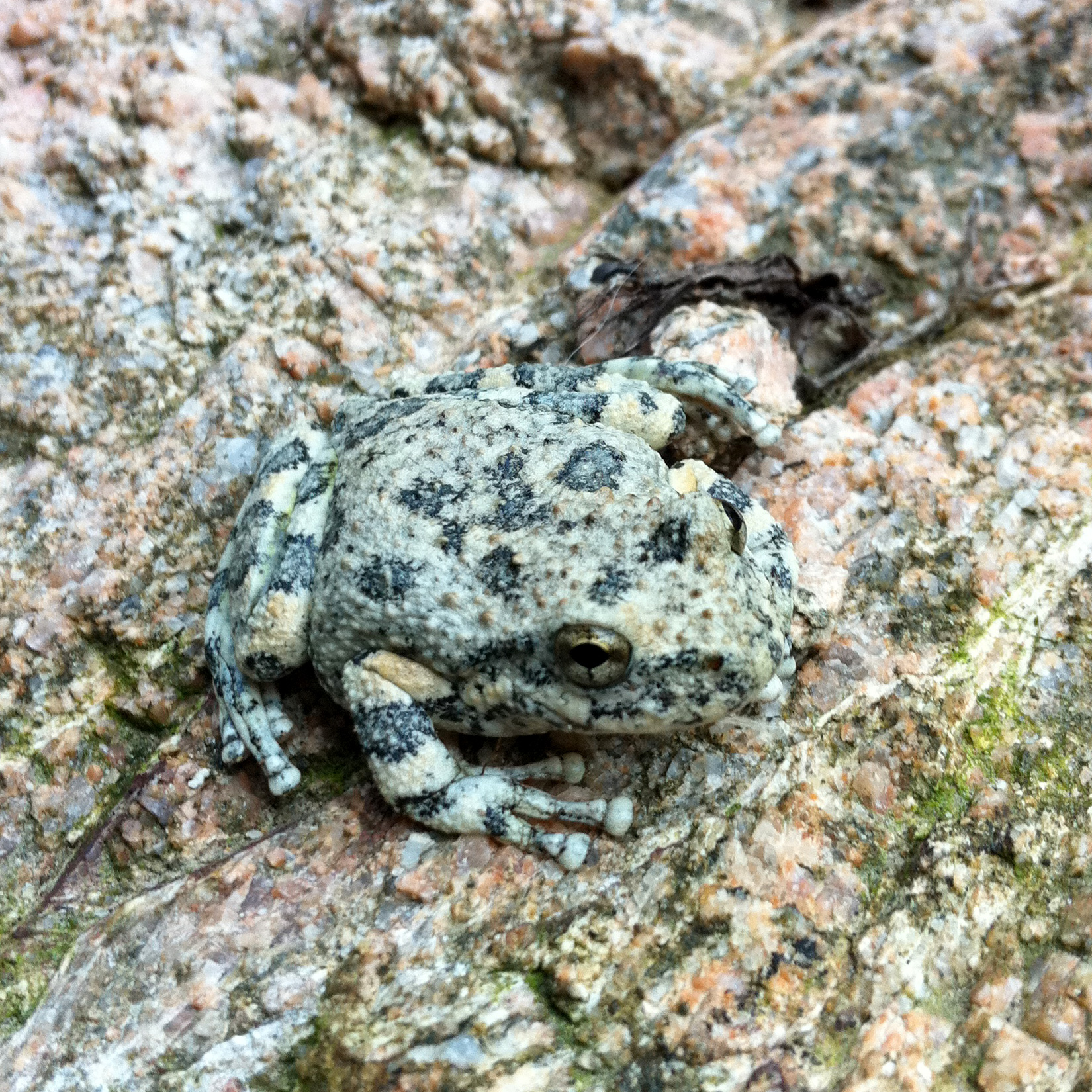

Conservation status
- Least Concern (IUCN 3.1)

Scientific classification
- Kingdom: Animalia
- Phylum: Chordata
- Class: Amphibia
- Order: Anura
- Family: Hylidae
- Genus: Pseudacris
- Species: P. cadaverina

Binomial name
- Pseudacris cadaverina (Cope, 1866)

Synonyms
- Hyla cadaverina Cope, 1866; Hyla nebulosa Hallowell, 1854; Hyla californiae Gorman, 1960

= California tree frog =

Species of amphibian

The California tree frog or California chorus frog (Pseudacris cadaverina) is a "true" tree frog (family Hylidae) from southern California (USA) and Baja California (Mexico). Until recently, the California tree frog was classified in the genus Hyla.

== Description ==
It is a cryptically colored species of tree frog, often resembling granitic stones. It is grey or light brown on its dorsum with darker blotches, and has a whitish venter. It is yellow on the undersides of its legs, groin, and lower abdomen; males of the species have a dusky-yellow throat. The California tree frog has conspicuous toe webbing and pads, and its dorsal skin is roughened and warty. It is 2.9–5 cm (1.1–2.0 in) long from snout to vent.

== Habitat and conservation ==
This species is most likely to occur along streams with abundant boulders and cobbles in their channels. Its distribution is spotty and localized. These frogs are easily handled.

California tree frog is not considered threatened by IUCN: it is a relatively common species with broad distribution, and there are no major threats, except perhaps UV radiation that reduces embryonic survival. Another possible threat to this frog species is habit fragmentation which could contribute to a lack of genetic diversity throughout populations in different areas.

== Origin ==
Genetic evidence from over 200 individual members of the species, collected from locations across multiple of California's unique biomes, suggests that these frogs originated at the eastern end of the Transverse Ranges. The same research found that the California tree frogs' genetic foundation dates back to Pleistocene Epoch.

== Predation ==
In stream ponds, California tree frogs are susceptible to predation by rainbow trout and two-striped garter snakes. Adults are often eaten by invasive green sunfish.
