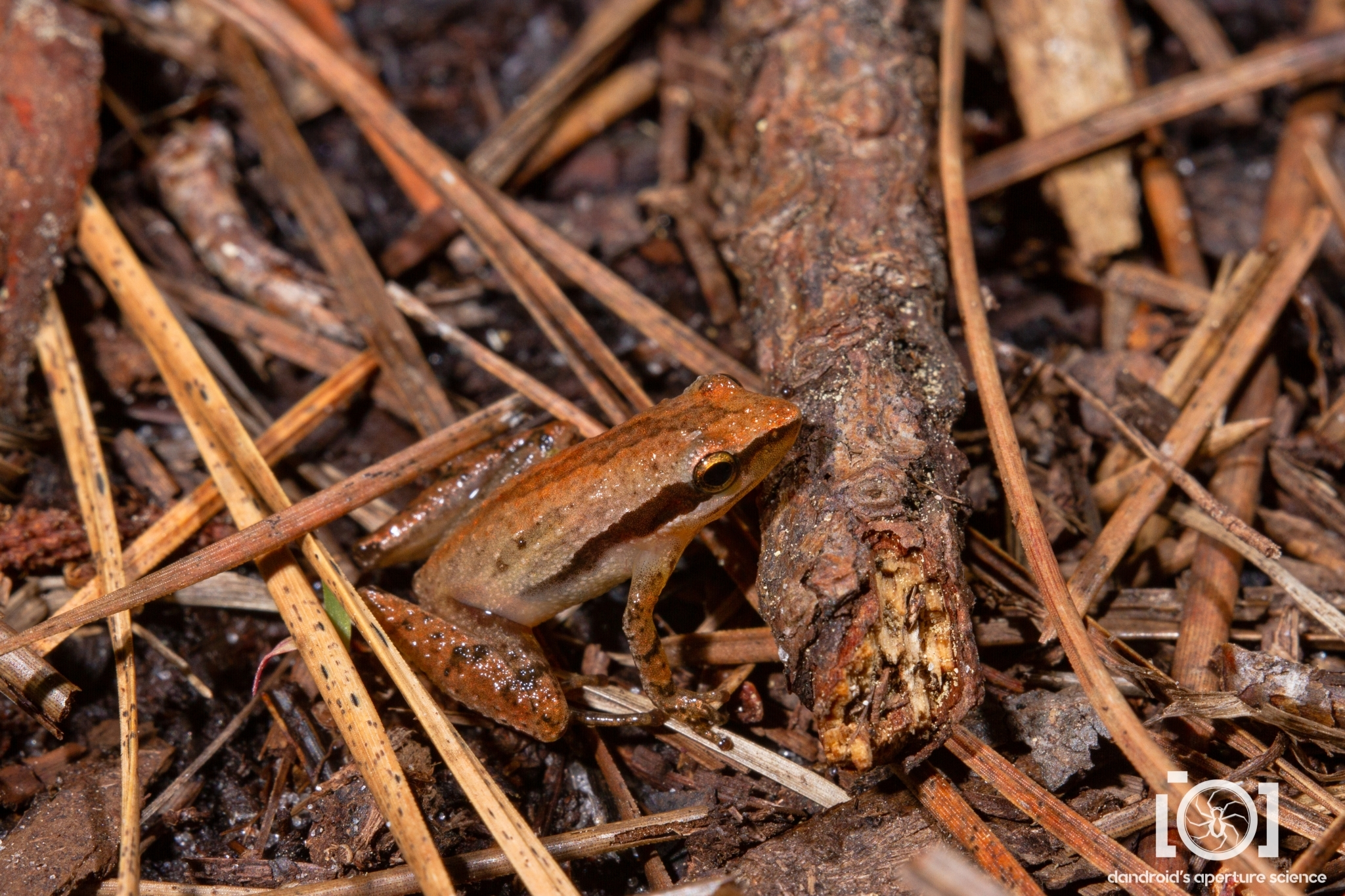

Conservation status
- Least Concern (IUCN 3.1)

Scientific classification
- Kingdom: Animalia
- Phylum: Chordata
- Class: Amphibia
- Order: Anura
- Family: Hylidae
- Genus: Pseudacris
- Species: P. ocularis

Binomial name
- Pseudacris ocularis (Bosc & Daudin, 1801)

Synonyms
- Hyla ocularis Bosc & Daudin in Sonnini & Latreille, 1801; Hyla oculata Daudin, 1802; Calamita ocularis — Merrem, 1820; Auletris ocularis — Wagler, 1830; Hylodes ocularis — Holbrook, 1838; Chorophilus angulatus Cope, 1875; Cystignathus ocularis — Cope, 1875; Chorophilus ocularis — Cope, 1875; Pseudacris ocularis — Stejneger & Barbour, 1917; Hyla ocularis — Noble, 1923; Acris ocularis — Mittleman, 1946; Limnaoedus ocularis — Mittleman & List, 1953; Pseudacris ocularis — Hedges, 1986

= Little grass frog =

Species of amphibian

The little grass frog (Pseudacris ocularis) is a species of chorus frog endemic to the Southeastern United States. It is currently the smallest North American anuran and occurs in a wide variety of ephemeral and semi-permanent wetlands.

== Description ==
P. ocularis is the smallest frog in North America, only reaching a maximum snout-vent-length of 18mm.It is normally pale brown, but can have a green or pink tinge. This species is further characterized by a variable dark stripe which runs through each of the frog's eyes and down the sides of its body. The Latin term ocularis translates to "of the eye" in reference to this bold ocular stripe.

== Habitat and feeding ==
This species occurs in a wide variety of ephemeral and semi-permanent wetlands in the southeastern Coastal Plain and favors grassy areas in and around cypress ponds and similar sites. It seldom inhabits permanent ponds, but it still can. Its range spreads from the southernmost parts of Florida and Alabama to Virginia.This species can be used as an indicator of healthy wetlands. In urbanized wetlands P. ocularis is noticeably absent. It is commonly found on lower tree trunks and foliage up to a height of 1 metre (3 ft) or more; males prefer these sites as calling perches. However, they spend a considerable amount of their foraging time on the ground. This species possesses the ability to rotate its head and neck more than other frog species due to unusual flexibility in its vertebral column. This is thought to aid in searching for prey or looking for a more suitable perch before leaping. The majority of food items consist of arthropods that are associated with leaf litter and/or soil—springtails, ants, thrips, palpigrades, etc. There has been some recorded research showing that adults have fed on large cockroaches, walking sticks, and mites.

== Reproduction ==
To gain a female's attention, males will remain perched on top of grass stems or tree trunks and call. This calling is most often compared to high insect-like chirps. P. ocularis The little Grass Frog breeds in shallow, fish free wetlands, including cypress domes, marshes, bogs, wet prairies, wet flatwoods, and floodplain forests. Generally breeding peaks in March and April, but can begin breeding in January in Florida. Females can generally reproduce more than once per annual cycle. The eggs will usually be laid on a pond bottom or vegetation in shallow water. Females lay an avergae of 100 eggs, but can lay up to 200 eggs with 1-5 eggs per cluster. Eggs take 1–2 days to hatch and larvae take 7–70 days to metamorphose. The average time to reach maturity is 7.31 days.

== Behavior ==
The little grass frog's call has 2 call components (pure tone followed by a train of pulses) which is unique in Family Hylidae. P. ocularis is often active both day and night and can be active year-round in some parts of their range.

== Predators and predator avoidance ==
The little grass frog has a few defensive mechanisms to avoid predation. Despite their small size, they can jump about 20 times their body length which can help them escape predators. Their coloration also provides them with a great advantage. They have a cryptic coloration similar to the vegetation in the areas in which they live. The dark stripes through their eye and along their sides are also thought to help break-up their outline to more visual predators. Some common predators are fish, larger frogs, and snakes. Nymphs of Odonata are also known to prey on little grass frog larvae.
