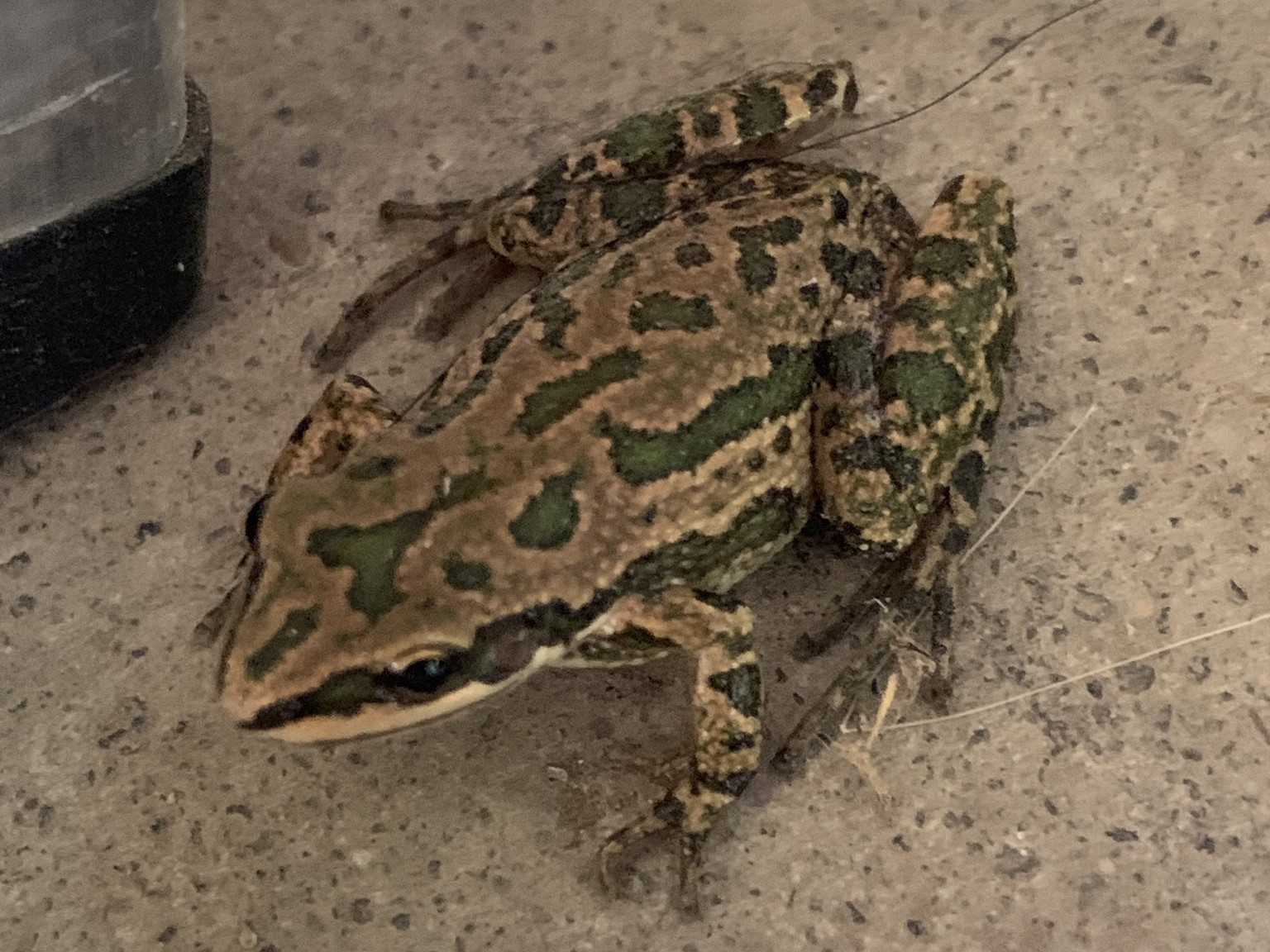

Conservation status
- Least Concern (IUCN 3.1)

Scientific classification
- Kingdom: Animalia
- Phylum: Chordata
- Class: Amphibia
- Order: Anura
- Family: Hylidae
- Genus: Pseudacris
- Species: P. clarkii

Binomial name
- Pseudacris clarkii Baird, 1854

Synonyms
- Helocaetes clarkii; Chorophilus triseriatus clarkii; Hyla clarkii

= Spotted chorus frog =

Species of amphibian

The spotted chorus frog or Clark's tree frog (Pseudacris clarkii) is a small, nocturnal chorus frog native to the grasslands and prairies of the central United States and Tamaulipas, Mexico.

== Description ==
Spotted chorus frogs are generally a grey or olive green in color, with lighter green mottling on their backs, and white in color on their undersides. They grow to a maximum of 1.25 inches (about 3–4 cm), with females being larger than males.

== Habitat ==
Spotted chorus frogs are found from central Kansas, Oklahoma, and northeastern New Mexico to the Gulf of Mexico and Rio Grande valley in Texas and Tamaulipas.

They are normally found in prairie and prairie islands in savannas. During breeding season, they can be found in temporary and semi-permanent ponds, and in marshes, shallow water-lily ponds, roadside ditches, grassy ponds, mesquite ponds, buffalo wallows, flooded fields, and other transient pools.
