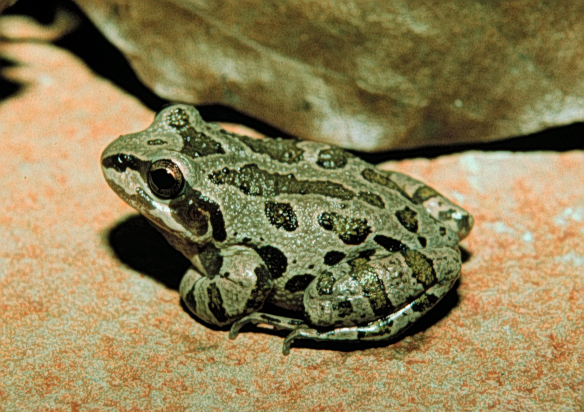

Conservation status
- Imperiled (NatureServe)

Scientific classification
- Kingdom: Animalia
- Phylum: Chordata
- Class: Amphibia
- Order: Anura
- Family: Hylidae
- Genus: Pseudacris
- Species: P. illinoensis

Binomial name
- Pseudacris illinoensis Smith, 1951

= Illinois chorus frog =

Species of amphibian

The Illinois chorus frog (Pseudacris illinoensis) is a species of chorus frog that lives in scattered, restricted habitat ecosystems in the states of Arkansas, Illinois, and Missouri. It was published by Smith in 1951. Its life cycle is little known, its isolated populations are increasingly restricted by agricultural drainage, and it is listed as a threatened subspecies. It is often referred to as a subspecies of P. streckeri. Collins recognized it as its own species which was followed by ASW6.0 and Amphibiaweb on the basis of its diagnosability from Pseudacris streckeri and its allopatry. The IUCNredlist 2013.2 has not incorporated this taxonomic split.

== Description ==
The Illinois chorus frog, a wetland amphibian, grows to a maximum length of 1.5 inches (3.8 cm). Its range is restricted to isolated sandy wetlands along the banks of the Mississippi River and a major tributary, the Illinois River.

Its life cycle begins with the mating season beginning in late February and continuing until late April, when the small amphibian signals its aptitude with a version of the distinctive cry that gives its genus its name. The breeding call can be heard at a distance of up to 1 mile (1.6 km). The pools of spring meltwater, where they live and eat, begin to dry up as early as mid-May, and the frogs disappear into hibernation below the winter frost line. With unusually strong forelegs for its size, the Illinois chorus frog is described as the only frog that uses a breast stroke motion to dig its sandy burrows.

== Threats ==
The Illinois chorus frogs' preferred habitat in Arkansas includes the patch of sandy wetland soil surrounding Stuttgart, Arkansas where rice is grown. However, the invention of laser land-levelling, and its use by rice paddy operators, has eliminated 61% of the subspecies' range in this southern state.

== Conservation ==
In 2025, a reporter interviewed a biological fieldworker for the Nature Conservancy who was looking for Illinois chorus frogs in a newly restored Mississippi River wetland in Alexander County, Illinois. The Illinois Department of Natural Resources carried out a field study of the Illinois chorus frog's habitat in Mason County, Illinois, in March 2011. The study hoped to develop a methodological protocol to monitor the Illinois chorus frog's threatened population.
