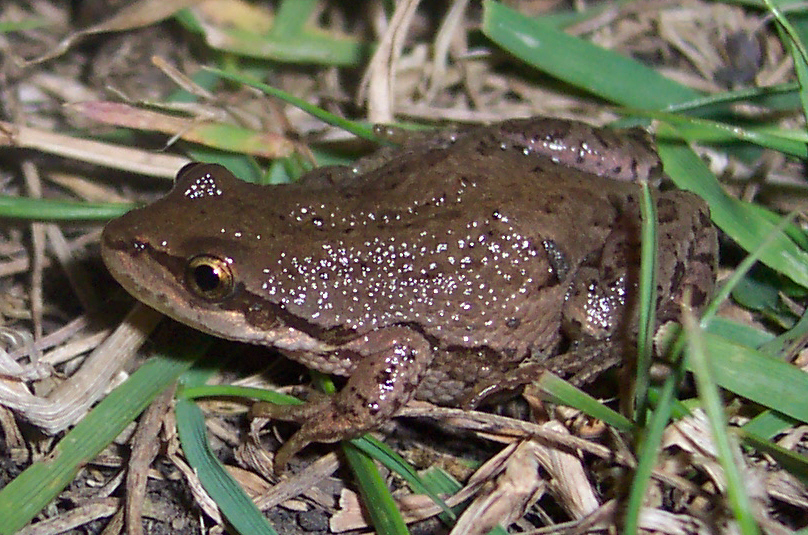

Conservation status
- Least Concern (IUCN 3.1)

Scientific classification
- Kingdom: Animalia
- Phylum: Chordata
- Class: Amphibia
- Order: Anura
- Family: Hylidae
- Genus: Pseudacris
- Species: P. maculata

Binomial name
- Pseudacris maculata Agassiz, 1850
- Range of P. maculata

= Boreal chorus frog =

Species of amphibian

The boreal chorus frog (Pseudacris maculata) is a species of chorus frog native to Canada from central Quebec to eastern British Columbia and north to the Northwest Territories and the southern portion of the Yukon. It occurs in the USA throughout Montana, Minnesota, northwestern Wisconsin, northeastern Arizona, northern New Mexico, and southwestern Utah.

== Description ==
This small species of frog reaches about 30 mm in length. It is highly variable, but is normally brown, and can be green on the dorsal surface, with three broken dorsal stripes; these stripes can be very distinct to quite faint. A dark band is present from the snout, across the eye, and continuing down the side. It has slightly enlarged toe pads to help in climbing small grasses and vegetation. This species is very similar to the western chorus frog (Pseudacris triseriata). It can be distinguished from this species by having shorter legs.

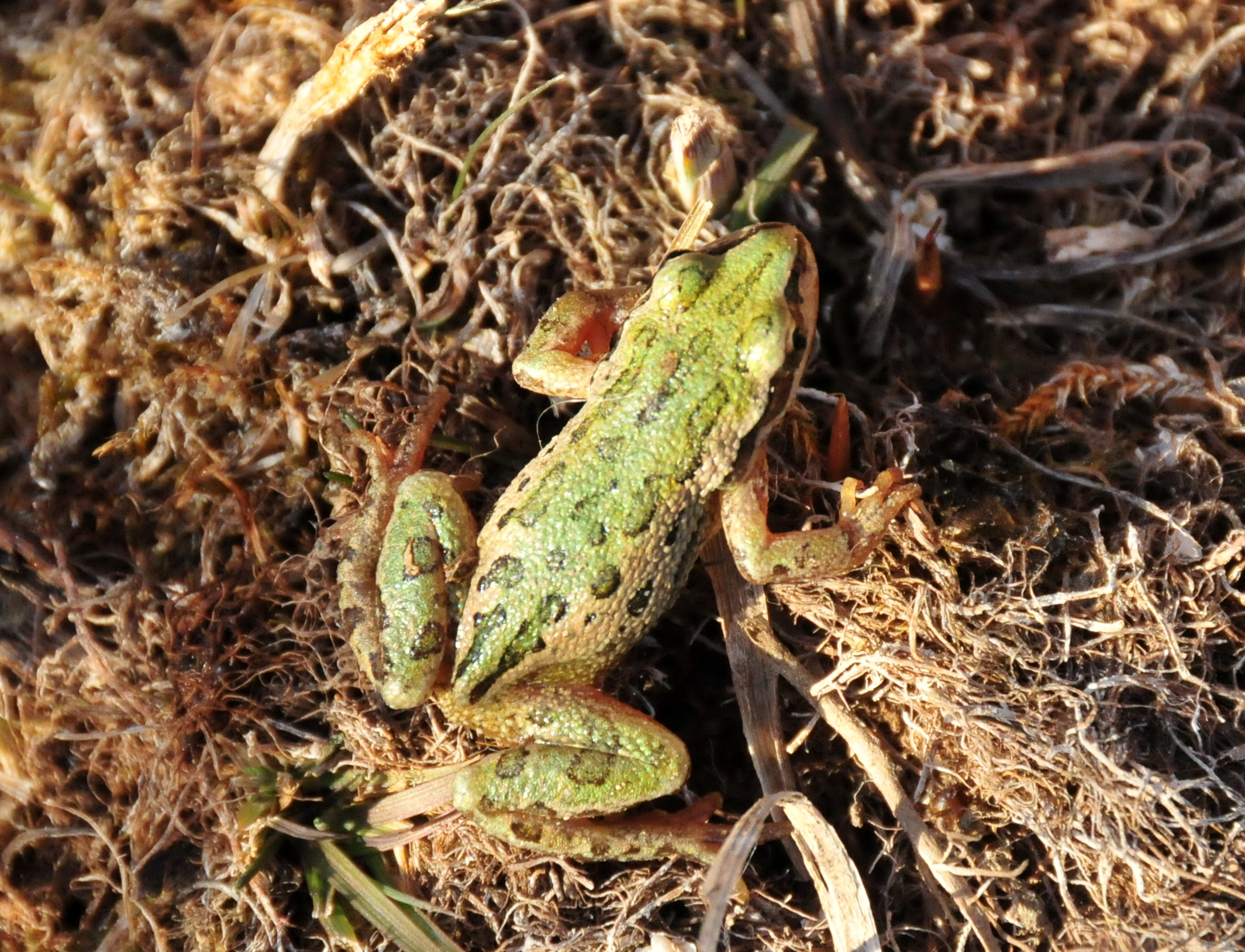
Green boreal chorus frog

== Ecology and behaviour ==
This species can be found around permanent water bodies in cleared land and forest. Males make a "reeeek" call from grasses, vegetation, or ground around the water body from April through to September. This call is characteristic of the trilling frog clade that is present in the genus Pseudacris. This clade is so named because the call of each individual is different, each having its own series of pulses. Within the trilling frog clade, they are further divided into "dynamic" and "static" groups, and recent studies have placed P. maculata into the static grouping. The static grouping is distinguished by a lack of variability in one's call and the ability to somewhat control the direction of their calls. Amphibians' songs or calls to one another are commonly used for sexual selection, but in Bee, et al. 2010, the researchers found no correlation that linked directly to sexual selection. They found a link between the lowest note in the song and body size, but insufficient evidence to draw any conclusions from it. Every call was different in the study, but the differences were subtle and required complex technology to pick up. The similarity in the calls results in the frogs not being able to distinguish individuals from each other. It was hypothesized that the calls were simply to broadcast their position to other calling males telling them to stay away and also to alert females to the presence of a male that is ready to mate. This is normally one of the first species of amphibian to emerge in spring. It comes out so early that it is often found while snow and ice are still present. This timing directly correlates with snow-melt and the water level of the water body that the populations calls home.

Pseudacris maculata is categorized as an annual breeder. Breeding takes place once the weather begins to warm, typically from late February to around April. After mating, a single female can lay anywhere from 500-1500 eggs, with a highly variable hatching rate of anywhere from 37% to 87%. The life cycle continues with tadpoles metamorphosing around June or July. The metamorphosis survival rate also has a massive range of 10-100% in the wild.

== Threats ==
Amphibians are widely known as very important species in their ecosystems, but declines are occurring worldwide in amphibian populations. There are multiple reasons that amphibians decline, with the most common being disease, habitat loss, over harvesting for food, pet trade, and competition with invasive species. Climate change has also been one of the proposed mechanisms for why this species is struggling. Climate change is causing the weather to become increasingly dry, which affects most amphibians (including Pseudacris maculata). This change leads them to modify their behavior based on the environmental conditions and sometimes exposing them to conditions that are not optimal. This dry weather has another effect on this species, it results in lower water levels, which exposes the amphibians and their eggs (which are laid in the water) to more extreme temperatures. This, coupled with the decrease in ozone layers, also exposes the amphibians and the eggs to heightened levels of UV radiation when compared to environments with deeper waters.

The boreal chorus frog has an interesting defense to invasive species. This species of frog has been found to have cultural learning on how to behave towards predators. Cultural learning is learning that takes place by an individual observing and imitating behaviors of other individuals in close proximity. The example brought up by Ferrari and Chivers 2008, is how P. maculata tadpoles learn to avoid salamanders from tadpoles that have experience with the predator. The paper discusses how if a new predator is added to the environment, there is a learning curve at how long it takes the tadpoles to learn to avoid the new predator. The addition of an invasive species will be very successful until the tadpoles learn to avoid it, which could cause even more pressure on this species.

Amphibians worldwide are being infected with the fungus Batrachochytrium dendrobatidis (Bd) and the boreal chorus frog is no exception. Bd infects the keratinized skin of its host, which results in an inability to properly osmoregulate through the skin. The symptoms to this disease vary between species, ranging from seemingly unaffected to death. This species of frog has been found to be infected at higher frequencies than other amphibians in the same environments. There have been many studies examining how this species copes with an infection of Bd. Some studies claim that Pseudacris maculata is struggling, while others show that populations are maintaining themselves. This is especially intriguing when one considers that the boreal chorus frog can have mortality up to 80% when infected with Bd. No definitive conclusions can be drawn with how Pseudacris maculata copes with the disease within a population.

Bd is an especially interesting and dangerous pathogen given the fact that it can persist in an environment even in the absence of amphibians. It can survive in water for an extended amount of time, as well as attach to feathers. These facts, on top of the fact that Bd can also infect salamanders and frogs in all stages of life result in the pathogen persisting in an environment long enough to continually infect new frogs (9,11). Tadpoles can be infected on their mouth parts (which is the only location of keratinized skin) and frogs post-metamorphosis can be infected almost anywhere (but primarily on the toes). The significance that salamanders (specifically tiger salamanders from the paper) can be infected is because they can perpetuate the presence of Bd in the environment which can then increase the odds that a frog will be infected by this disease. Salamanders can also overwinter in the water itself, while frogs live terrestrially during the winter. This is significant because without the living hosts keeping Bd alive in the water, it would have a high chance to die off over the winter in the water with no hosts. Boreal chorus frogs in areas that contain salamanders capable of surviving with Bd cannot escape this disease, which could be why some populations are declining.
