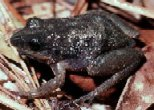

Conservation status
- Least Concern (IUCN 3.1)

Scientific classification
- Kingdom: Animalia
- Phylum: Chordata
- Class: Amphibia
- Order: Anura
- Family: Hylidae
- Genus: Pseudacris
- Species: P. nigrita

Binomial name
- Pseudacris nigrita (LeConte, 1825)

Synonyms
- Rana nigrita LeConte, 1825; Cystignathus nigritus Holbrook, 1842

= Southern chorus frog =

Species of amphibian

The southern chorus frog (Pseudacris nigrita) is a species of frog in the family Hylidae, endemic to the southeastern United States. Its natural habitats are temperate forests, temperate grassland, shrub-dominated wetlands, swamps, freshwater marshes, intermittent freshwater marshes, ponds, open excavations, seasonally flooded agricultural land, and canals and ditches. It is threatened by habitat loss.
