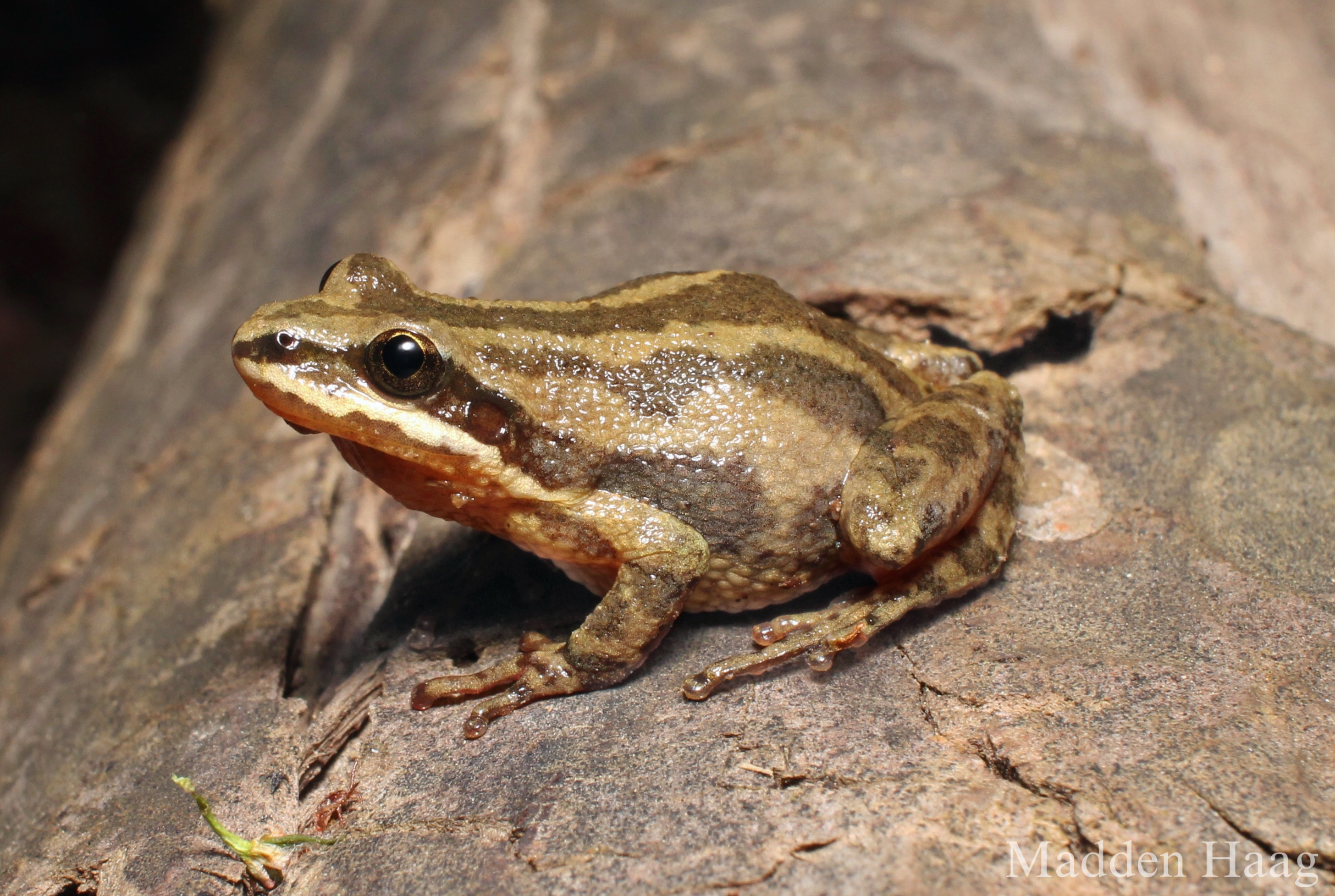

Conservation status
- Least Concern (IUCN 3.1)

Scientific classification
- Kingdom: Animalia
- Phylum: Chordata
- Class: Amphibia
- Order: Anura
- Family: Hylidae
- Genus: Pseudacris
- Species: P. feriarum

Binomial name
- Pseudacris feriarum Baird, 1854

Synonyms
- Pseudacris triseriata feriarum

= Upland chorus frog =

Species of amphibian

The upland chorus frog (Pseudacris feriarum) is a species of chorus frog found in the United States. It was recently separated from the Western chorus frog (Pseudacris triseriata), being identified as an individual species rather than a subspecies. They are a rarely seen species, but their calls are frequently heard soon after rains in the spring time.

== Habitat ==
Within their range, this species is found in a variety of habitats that include: swampy areas of broad valleys, grassy swales, moist areas of woodlands and borders of heavily vegetated ponds.

== Description ==
Upland chorus frogs are usually brown, grey-brown, or reddish-brown in color, with darker blotching. They grow from 0.75–1.5 inches (1.9–3.8 cm) in size. A white line is present on the head, above the upper lip. Dorsally, there are 3 longitudinal lines which may be complete or broken into spots and a triangular spot on the head usually connects with the middle stripe. Tend to be smaller with a slender waist and long limbs. Males possess a single, round vocal patch, which is yellow, grey or brown over a lighter background colour.

== Geographic distribution ==
Found in the southern and eastern United States, the upland chorus frog is found from the state of New Jersey to the Florida panhandle; west to eastern Texas and southeast Oklahoma. In West Virginia their distribution is limited to the eastern panhandle and Ridge and Valley region where they are very rare and imperiled.

== Behavior ==
Upland Chorus Frog

Upland chorus frogs are secretive, freeze-tolerant, nocturnal frogs, and are rarely seen (or heard) except immediately after rains. They are considered a polygynous, or “lekking” species. . More recent studies suggest that the proportion of chorus frog that breed more than once is greater than previously thought. Their chorus will vary depending on the area they are found within, because they have significantly different pulse patterns in many different locations across their distribution. They are an almost entirely terrestrial species, and found in a variety of habitats, but usually moderately moist, vegetated areas, not far from a permanent water source. Like most frogs, they are insectivorous. Breeding occurs throughout the year, but most frequently during the cooler, more rainy periods from November to March. Eggs are laid in clusters of 60 or so, and females will lay 197–835 eggs (average 441.314 ± 50.26). Breeding sites are typically small temporary pools and puddles in grassy fields; they do not breed in permanent water. Most chorus frogs reach sexual maturity by the end of the first summer, individuals generally do not breed during the first year. At the beginning of the breeding season, males gather in large groups shortly after emerging from hibernation, and remain within the breeding habitat for 4–10 weeks. After spawning concludes, males will continue to call to attract more mates, whereas females will return to terrestrial habitat after oviposition. The female can lay upwards of 1,000 eggs at a time. The egg period lasts from 3–17 days, followed by a larval period of 5.1 weeks. Larvae consume algae. Adults consume insects. Adult chorus frogs are prey to birds, fishes, and other animals.

== Conservation status ==
The upland chorus frog is listed as a protected species in the state of New Jersey, primarily due to habitat destruction. Because of its restrictive habitat preferences, this species is declining in several states, particularly in areas where roadside ditches and other ephemeral pools are being drained or destroyed for new developments.
