= List of amphibians of Alabama =

The U.S. state of Alabama has 73 known indigenous amphibian species. These indigenous species include 30 frog and toad species and 43 salamander species. Two of these native species may have become extirpated within the state. They are the Mississippi gopher frog and flatwoods salamander.

Human predation, pollution, and habitat destruction has placed several amphibian species at risk of extirpation or extinction. The Alabama Department of Conservation and Natural Resources lists the conservation status of each species within the state with a rank of lowest, low, moderate, high, and highest concern.

== Frogs and toads ==
Image	Scientific name	Common name	Family	Conservation concern
	Anaxyrus americanus	American toad	Bufonidae	Lowest
	Anaxyrus fowleri	Fowler's toad	Bufonidae	Lowest
	Anaxyrus quercicus	oak toad	Bufonidae	Moderate
	Anaxyrus terrestris	southern toad	Bufonidae	Lowest
	Incilius nebulifer	Gulf Coast toad	Bufonidae	Unranked
	Acris crepitans	northern cricket frog	Hylidae	Low
	Acris gryllus	southern cricket frog	Hylidae	Lowest
	Dryophytes andersonii	pine barrens treefrog	Hylidae	High
	Dryophytes avivocus	bird-voiced treefrog	Hylidae	Lowest
	Dryophytes chrysoscelis	Cope's gray treefrog	Hylidae	Lowest
	Dryophytes cinereus	American green treefrog	Hylidae	Lowest
	Dryophytes femoralis	pine woods treefrog	Hylidae	Lowest
	Dryophytes gratiosus	barking treefrog	Hylidae	Low
	Dryophytes squirellus	squirrel treefrog	Hylidae	Low
	Pseudacris brachyphona	mountain chorus frog	Hylidae	Lowest
	Pseudacris collinsorum	Collinses' mountain chorus frog	Hylidae	Unranked
	Pseudacris crucifer	spring peeper	Hylidae	Lowest
	Pseudacris feriarum	upland chorus frog	Hylidae	Lowest
	Pseudacris nigrita	southern chorus frog	Hylidae	Lowest
	Pseudacris ocularis	little grass frog	Hylidae	High
	Pseudacris ornata	ornate chorus frog	Hylidae	Moderate
	Osteopilus septentrionalis	Cuban tree frog	Hylidae	Exotic invasive throughout Florida, becoming more common in southern Alabama
	Eleutherodactylus planirostris	greenhouse frog	Eleutherodactylidae	Exotic, Native to Cuba and the Caribbean.
	Gastrophryne carolinensis	eastern narrowmouth toad	Microhylidae	Lowest
	Scaphiopus holbrookii	eastern spadefoot	Pelobatidae	Low
	Lithobates capito	gopher frog	Ranidae	Highest
	Lithonates catesbeiana	American bullfrog	Ranidae	Lowest
	Lithobates clamitans ssp.	bronze frog green frog	Ranidae	Lowest
	Lithobates grylio	pig frog	Ranidae	Lowest
	Lithobates sevosa	Mississippi gopher frog	Ranidae	Possibly extirpated/ U.S. Fish and Wildlife lists as endangered
	Lithobates heckscheri	river frog	Ranidae	Highest
	Lithobates palustris	pickerel frog	Ranidae	Low
	Lithobates sphenocephala	southern leopard frog	Ranidae	Lowest
	Lithobates sylvatica	wood frog	Ranidae	Moderate

== Salamanders ==
Image	Scientific name	Common name	Family	Conservation concern
	Ambystoma bishopi	reticulated flatwoods salamander	Ambystomatidae	Highest
	Ambystoma cingulatum	flatwoods salamander	Ambystomatidae	Possibly extirpated/ U.S. Fish and Wildlife lists as threatened
	Ambystoma maculatum	spotted salamander	Ambystomatidae	Low
	Ambystoma opacum	marbled salamander	Ambystomatidae	Low
	Ambystoma talpoideum	mole salamander	Ambystomatidae	Low
	Ambystoma texanum	smallmouth salamander	Ambystomatidae	Moderate
	Ambystoma tigrinum	eastern tiger salamander	Ambystomatidae	Moderate
	Amphiuma means	two-toed amphiuma	Amphiumidae	Low
	Amphiuma pholeter	one-toed amphiuma	Amphiumidae	High
	Amphiuma tridactylum	three-toed amphiuma	Amphiumidae	Low
	Cryptobranchus alleganiensis alleganiensis	hellbender	Cryptobranchidae	Highest
	Aneides aeneus	green salamander	Plethodontidae	High
	Desmognathus aeneus	seepage salamander	Plethodontidae	High
	Desmognathus apalachicolae	Apalachicola dusky salamander	Plethodontidae	Lowest
	Desmognathus auriculatus	southern dusky salamander	Plethodontidae	Highest
	Desmognathus cheaha	Talladega seal salamander	Plethodontidae	Unranked
	Desmognathus conanti	spotted dusky salamander	Plethodontidae	Low
	Desmognathus monticola	seal salamander	Plethodontidae	Low
	Desmognathus ocoee	Ocoee salamander	Plethodontidae	Moderate
	Eurycea aquatica	brownback salamander	Plethodontidae	Moderate
	Eurycea chamberlaini	Chamberlain's dwarf salamander	Plethodontidae	Moderate
	Eurycea cirrigera	southern two-lined salamander	Plethodontidae	Lowest
	Eurycea guttolineata	three-lined salamander	Plethodontidae	Lowest
	Eurycea hillisi	Hillis's dwarf salamander	Plethodontidae	Unranked
	Eurycea longicauda	long-tailed salamander	Plethodontidae	Lowest
	Eurycea lucifuga	cave salamander spotted-tail salamander	Plethodontidae	Lowest
	Eurycea quadridigitata	dwarf salamander	Plethodontidae	Moderate
	Eurycea sphagnicola	bog dwarf salamander	Plethodontidae	Unranked
	Gyrinophilus palleucus	Tennessee cave salamander	Plethodontidae	High
	Gyrinophilus porphyriticus ssp.	spring salamander	Plethodontidae	Low
	Hemidactylium scutatum	four-toed salamander	Plethodontidae	Low
	Phaeognathus hubrichti	Red Hills salamander	Plethodontidae	High/ U.S. Fish and Wildlife lists as threatened Official state amphibian
	Plethodon glutinosus	northern slimy salamander	Plethodontidae	Lowest
	Plethodon dorsalis	northern zigzag salamander	Plethodontidae	Unranked
	Plethodon grobmani	southeastern slimy salamander	Plethodontidae	Lowest
	Plethodon mississippi	Mississippi slimy salamander	Plethodontidae	Lowest
	Plethodon serratus	southern redback salamander	Plethodontidae	Moderate
	Plethodon ventralis	southern zigzag salamander	Plethodontidae	Lowest
	Plethodon websteri	Webster's salamander	Plethodontidae	Lowest
	Pseudotriton montanus flavissimus	Gulf Coast mud salamander	Plethodontidae	Low
	Pseudotriton ruber ruber	northern red salamander	Plethodontidae	Low
	Pseudotriton ruber vioscai	southern red salamander	Plethodontidae	Moderate
	Necturus alabamensis	Alabama waterdog Black Warrior waterdog	Proteidae	High
	Necturus beyeri	Gulf Coast waterdog speckled waterdog Beyer's waterdog	Proteidae	Low
	Necturus maculosus	common mudpuppy	Proteidae	Low
	Necturus mounti	Escambia waterdog	Proteidae	Unranked
	Necturus moleri	Apalachicola waterdog	Proteidae	Unranked
	Necturus species	Loding's waterdog	Proteidae	Low/ Taxonomy undescribed Known from lesser Gulf of Mexico drainages from Mobile Bay eastward.
	Notophthalmus viridescens ssp.	eastern newt	Salamandridae	Lowest
	Siren intermedia	lesser siren	Sirenidae	Lowest
	Siren lacertina	greater siren	Sirenidae	Moderate
	Siren nettingi	western lesser siren	Sirenidae	Unranked
	Siren reticulata	reticulated siren/leopard eel	Sirenidae	Undetermined; Species identified in 2018 Known from two locations in the southern pin plains and hills of the state.
