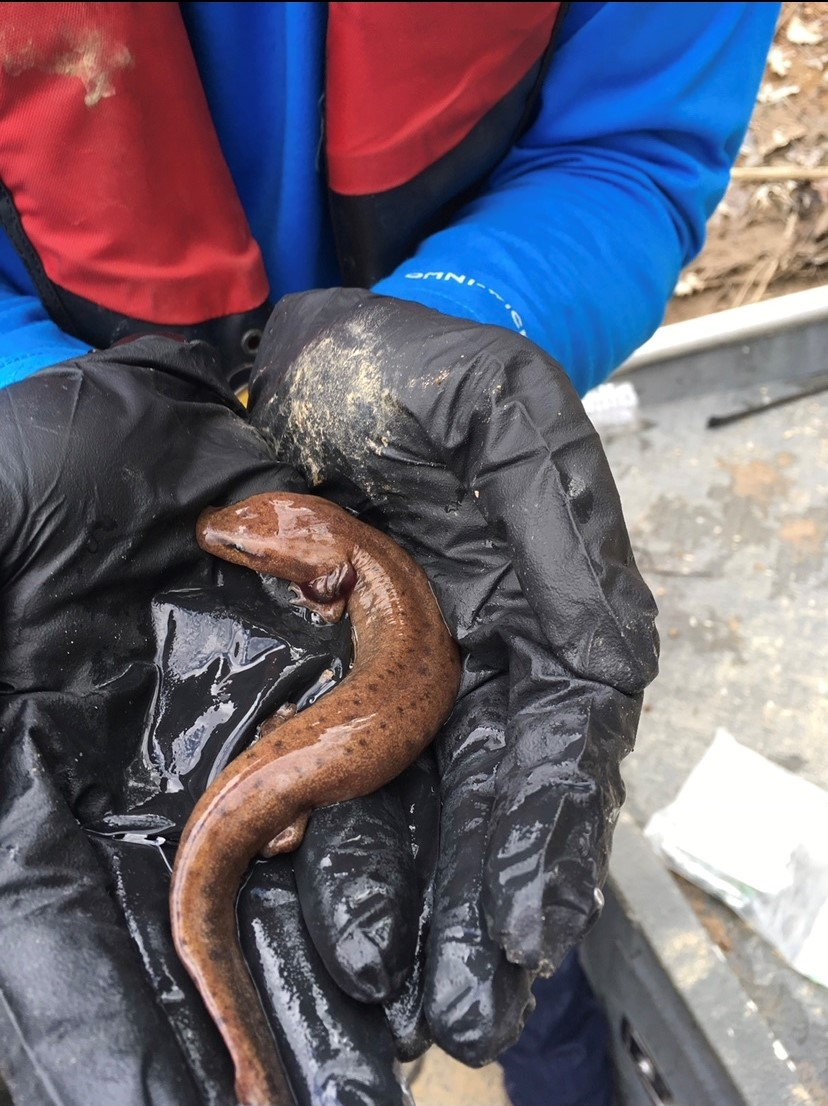

Conservation status
- Vulnerable (IUCN 3.1)

- Critically Imperiled (NatureServe)

Scientific classification
- Kingdom: Animalia
- Phylum: Chordata
- Class: Amphibia
- Order: Urodela
- Family: Proteidae
- Genus: Necturus
- Species: N. alabamensis

Binomial name
- Necturus alabamensis Viosca, 1937

= Alabama waterdog =

Species of amphibian

The Alabama waterdog (Necturus alabamensis) is a medium-sized perennibranch salamander inhabiting rivers and streams of Alabama. It is listed as endangered by the IUCN and the United States Fish and Wildlife Service.

== Description ==
The Alabama waterdog is medium-sized at 15–22 cm (5.9–8.7 in), with four toes and a laterally compressed tail. Its gills are permanent, bushy, and red. Typical adults exhibit a brown or black dorsum with minimal or no spotting, and the ventral side is white and often not spotted.

== Distribution and habitat ==
The Alabama waterdog is found in the Appalachian headwaters of the Black Warrior River drainage basin in Alabama. Its range includes the Sipsey Fork and Brushy Creek in Winston County, the Mulberry Fork, Blackwater Creek, and Lost Creek in Walker County, the North River and Yellow Creek in Tuscaloosa County, and the Locust Fork and Blackburn Fork in Blount County. It is found in unsilted small and medium-sized streams in clay areas. It is more likely to be present when the larvae of the northern dusky salamander (Desmognathus fuscus) are present and less likely in streams where Asiatic mussels are abundant. The areas of dead leaves and detritus sometimes found in backwaters are important for this species.

== Diet ==
N. alabamensis typically consumes invertebrates such as crayfish, amphipods, and insect larvae, as well as vertebrates such as small fish.

== Taxonomy ==
The taxonomy of N. alabamensis is poorly understood. It is believed to be related to N. maculosus and N. beyeri. It is known to hybridize with N. beyeri, though electrophoretical evidence suggests they are separate species.

== Status ==
The survival of N. alabamensis is threatened by habitat fragmentation and pollution and the IUCN has listed it as "Endangered". The quality of the water has deteriorated due to industrial, mining, agricultural, and urban pollution, and various impoundments have been made inhibiting its free movement. Even within the best habitats in their range, they are uncommon and their abundance may fluctuate. On 2 January 2018, the Alabama waterdog gained federal protection under the Endangered Species Act of 1973. Along with its listing, 420 river miles of critical habitat gained protection from activities that could be injurious to the salamander. Parties wishing to undertake actions that may damage the salamander's critical habitat must now apply for a federal permit to do so.
