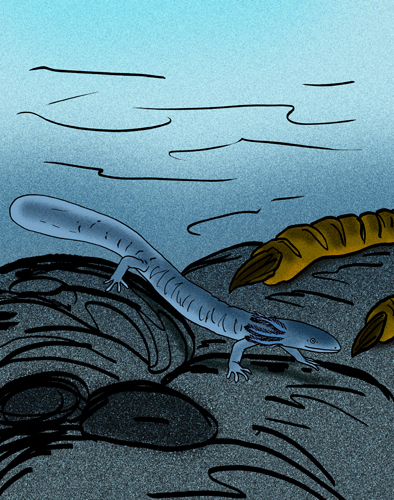
- Reconstruction of M. wezei

Scientific classification
- Kingdom: Animalia
- Phylum: Chordata
- Class: Amphibia
- Order: Urodela
- Family: Proteidae
- Genus: †Mioproteus; Darevsky, 1978

Species
- M. caucasicus; M. wezei

= Mioproteus =

Mioproteus Temporal range: Middle Miocene to Middle Pleistocene

Extinct genus of salamanders

Mioproteus is an extinct genus of prehistoric salamanders from Neogene Europe. Its living relatives are the olm and the mudpuppies. The species M. caucasicus is from the Middle Miocene. The species M. wezei first appears in the fossil record during the Pliocene, then disappears during the Middle Pleistocene.

== See also ==
- Prehistoric amphibian
- List of prehistoric amphibians
