= Necturus krausei =

Necturus krausei Temporal range: Tiffanian ~61.7–56.8 Ma

Scientific classification
- Kingdom: Animalia
- Phylum: Chordata
- Class: Amphibia
- Order: Urodela
- Family: Proteidae
- Genus: Necturus
- Species: †N. krausei

Binomial name
- †Necturus krausei Naylor, 1978

Extinct species of amphibian

Necturus krausei is an extinct species of mudpuppy salamanders from the Paleocene of Saskatchewan in Canada. It is known from a set of vertebrae found in the Ravenscrag Formation.
