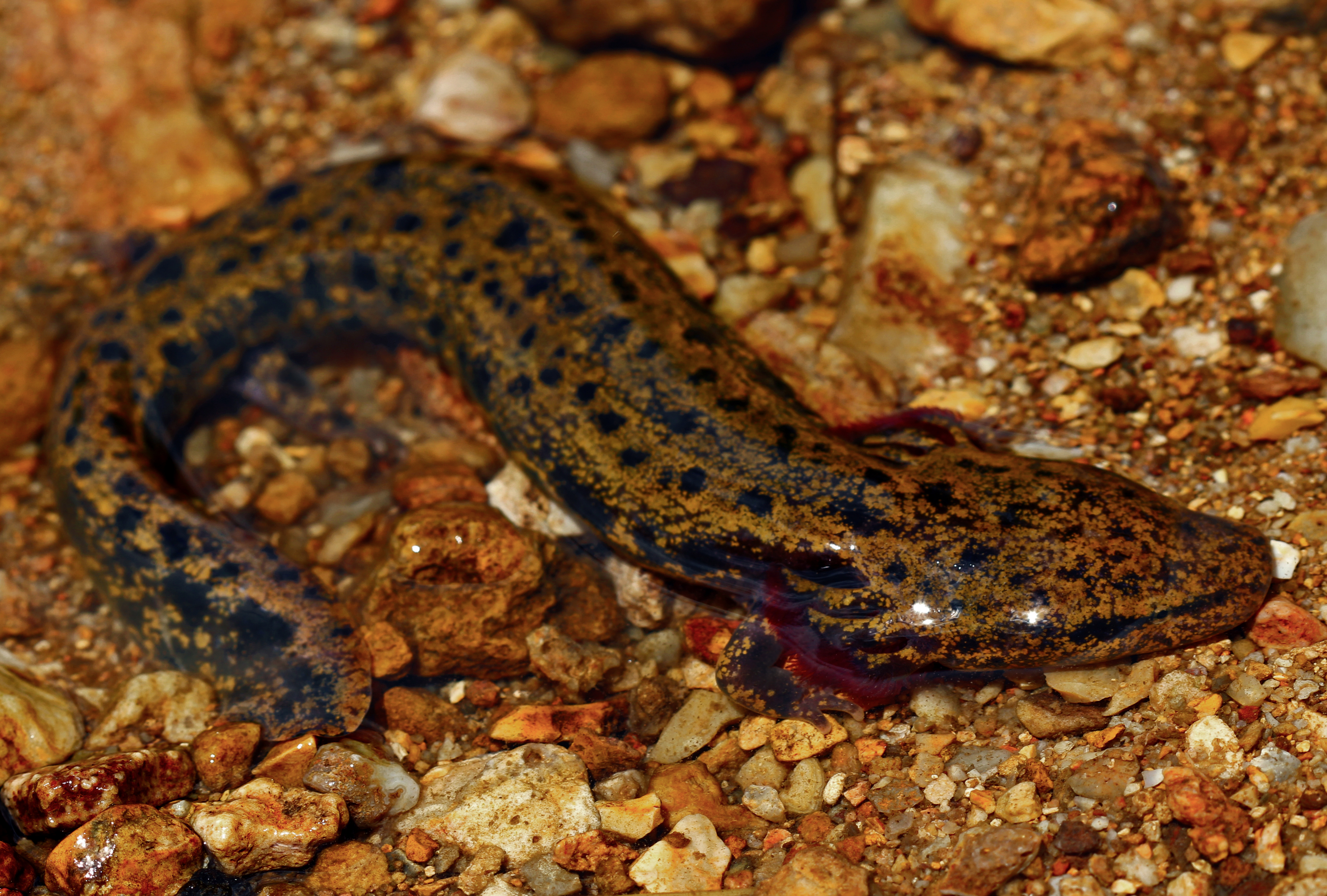

Conservation status
- Apparently Secure (NatureServe)

Scientific classification
- Kingdom: Animalia
- Phylum: Chordata
- Class: Amphibia
- Order: Urodela
- Family: Proteidae
- Genus: Necturus
- Species: N. maculosus

Binomial name
- Necturus maculosus Viosca, 1938

Synonyms
- Necturus louisianensis

= Red River waterdog =

Red River mudpuppy

Species of amphibian

The Red River mudpuppy (Necturus maculosus louisianensis), also called Louisiana waterdog or Red River waterdog, is a subspecies of aquatic salamander in the family Proteidae.

== Taxonomy ==
Most taxonomic authorities currently [when?] consider this salamander to be a subspecies of the common mudpuppy (N. maculosus): N. maculosus louisianensis, or the Red River waterdog. The Red River waterdog was proposed as a separate species from the common mudpuppy by Collins in 1991, but supporting data was lacking. Petranka (1998) and Crother (2017) both treated this fully aquatic salamander as a subspecies. Phylogenetic and morphological analyses conducted by Chabbaria et al. 2018, suggested two distinct lineages of N. maculosus in the Great Lakes and Mississippi River, and similar results were obtained from analyses of mitochondrial DNA (mtDNA) samples from the upper Midwest, Great Lakes, and New England by Greenwald et al. 2020.

== Geographic range ==
It is found in southeastern Kansas, southern Missouri, northeastern Oklahoma, Arkansas, and northcentral Louisiana. It lives only in the Red River and adjacent drainage systems.

== Description ==
Differs in appearance from the common mudpuppy, which is gray to brown, with round blue-black spots. The Red River mudpuppy is light yellowish brown with a white stripe on either side of the middorsal area.

== Diet and behavior ==
It eats mainly small underwater animals. Its feathery gills make it only able to breathe only underwater, not on land. It and many other mudpuppies can still go on land, but not for a very long time. They go on land only if the water is too dirty so they can find cleaner water in another part of the river.
