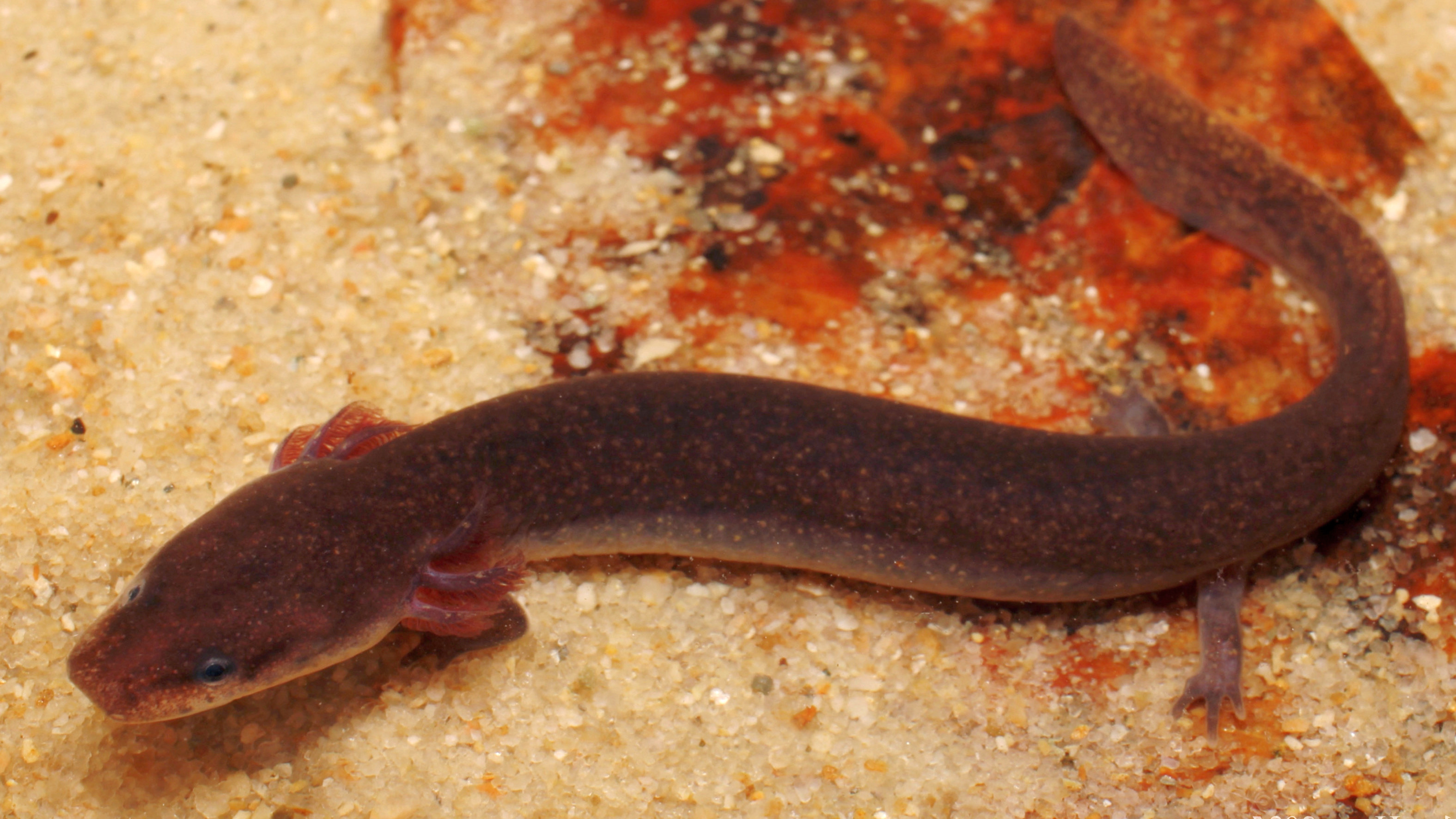
- Dwarf waterdog (Necturus punctatus)

Conservation status
- Least Concern (IUCN 3.1)

- Secure (NatureServe)

Scientific classification
- Kingdom: Animalia
- Phylum: Chordata
- Class: Amphibia
- Order: Urodela
- Family: Proteidae
- Genus: Necturus
- Species: N. punctatus

Binomial name
- Necturus punctatus (Gibbes, 1850)

Synonyms
- Menobranchus punctatus Gibbes, 1850; Necturus punctatus – Garman, 1884

= Dwarf waterdog =

Species of amphibian

The dwarf waterdog (Necturus punctatus) is an aquatic salamander endemic to the Eastern United States. It is the smallest member of the family Proteidae.

== Description ==
This species is usually between 11.5 and 19 cm (4.5 and 7.5 in) long. It has bushy, narrow gills and a compressed tail. All feet have four toes. The salamander is uniform slate gray to brown or dark olive dorsally and dirty white ventrally. Most individuals have no dorsal spots; when the dorsal spots are present, the venter is unspotted (unlike in Necturus lewisi, which is also a larger species). Juveniles are uniformly brown dorsally (as opposed to striped, as in other juvenile Necturus).

== Geographic range ==
Necturus punctatus is found on the Atlantic coastal plain and the Piedmont of the eastern United States, from southeastern Virginia to southcentral Georgia. Populations further west into Alabama and Florida represent another, undescribed species.

== Habitat ==
Dwarf waterdogs live in slow, sand- or mud-bottomed streams and connected ditches, cypress swamps; also stream-fed rice fields and mill ponds. They prefer bottoms with leaf litter and other detritus. During winter juveniles burrow into bottom and adults in leaf beds.

== Conservation ==
Necturus punctatus is not considered threatened—it has a relatively wide range, with viable populations through most of it. It is not facing major threats, and it is present in several protected areas.
