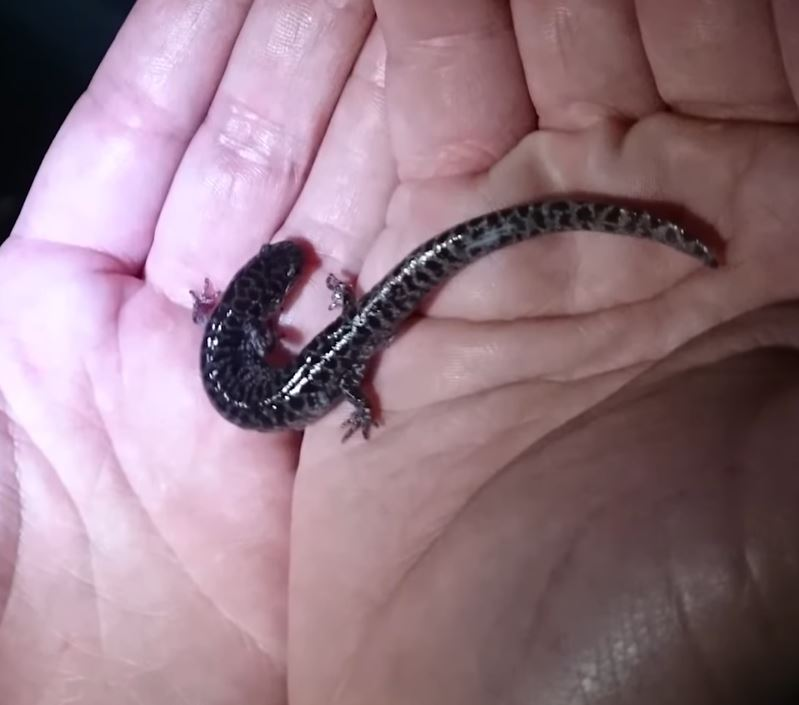

Conservation status
- Endangered (IUCN 3.1)

Scientific classification
- Kingdom: Animalia
- Phylum: Chordata
- Class: Amphibia
- Order: Urodela
- Family: Ambystomatidae
- Genus: Ambystoma
- Species: A. bishopi

Binomial name
- Ambystoma bishopi Goin, 1950
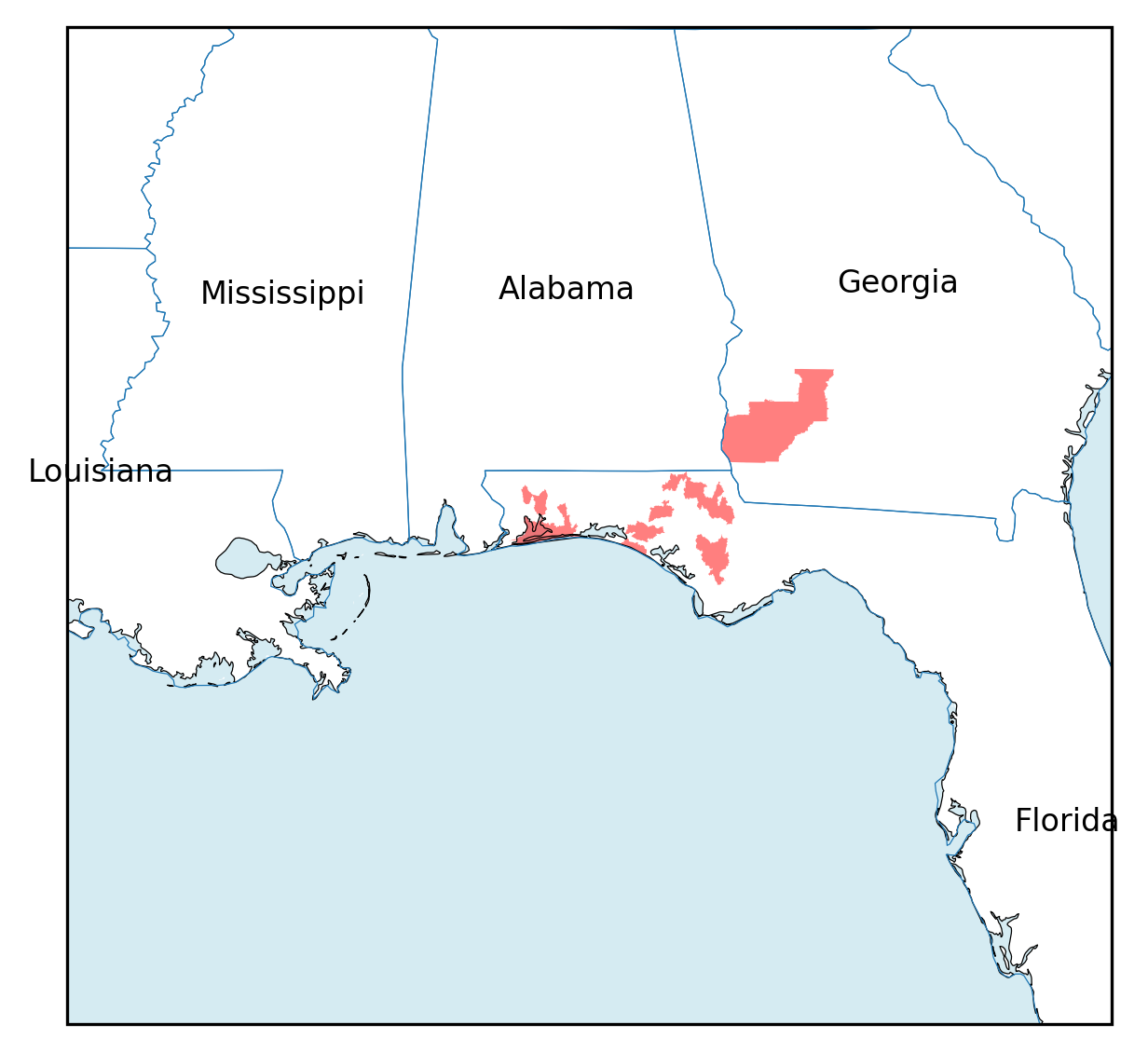
- Range of Ambystoma bishopi

Synonyms
- Ambystoma cingulatum bishopi Goin, 1950; Ambystoma bishopi — Pauly, Piskurek & Shaffer, 2007

= Reticulated flatwoods salamander =

Species of amphibian

The reticulated flatwoods salamander (Ambystoma bishopi) is a species of mole salamander, an amphibian in the family Ambystomatidae. The species is native to a small portion of the southeastern coastal plain of the United States in the western panhandle of Florida and extreme southwestern Georgia. The species once occurred in portions of southern Alabama but is now considered extirpated there. Its ecology and life history are nearly identical to its sister species, the frosted flatwoods salamander (A. cingulatum). A. bishopi inhabits seasonally wet pine flatwoods and pine savannas west of the Apalachicola River-Flint River system. The fire ecology of longleaf pine savannas is well-known, but there is less information on natural fire frequencies of wetland habitats in this region. Like the frosted flatwoods salamander, the reticulated flatwoods salamander breeds in ephemeral wetlands with extensive emergent vegetation, probably maintained by summer fires. Wetlands overgrown with woody shrubs are less likely to support breeding populations.

== Etymology ==
The specific name, bishopi, is in honor of American herpetologist Sherman C. Bishop.

== Description ==
Ambystoma bishopi is a medium-sized species with a snout to vent length of 40 to 50 millimetres (1.6 to 2.0 in) and 14 to 16 costal grooves. The head is long with a tapered snout and there are vomerine teeth in the roof of the mouth. The forelimbs are stout and the tail is flattened towards the tip, being shorter than the head and body length combined. The skin is smooth and the dorsal surface is reticulated, with thin grey lines forming a net-like pattern on a brownish-black background. The ventral surface is dark with sparse white speckles. This salamander is similar in appearance to Ambystoma cingulatum but the latter has a more frosted dorsal pattern and larger white spots on the ventral surface.

== Distribution and habitat ==
Ambystoma bishopi is a burrowing species of salamander and lives among the leaf litter beneath longleaf pine (Pinus palustris) and wiregrass (Aristida stricta) in the flatwoods coastal plain ecosystems of the Southeastern United States.

== Biology ==
Ambystoma bishopi is a terrestrial species. Breeding starts with the arrival of the rains in October. Eggs are laid in small depressions under herbaceous vegetation or leaf litter, at the base of stumps, in the entrances of crayfish holes, or in other hidden places near ponds. After about three weeks they are ready to hatch but do not do so until they are flooded with water. The larvae are nocturnal, hiding during the day in the leaf litter and emerging to feed in the water at night. Metamorphosis usually takes place in the spring and mature individuals move to higher areas away from water where they live until the fall, when they return to flooded areas to breed. Hatchlings need a minimum of eleven weeks but a maximum of up to eighteen weeks, depending on conditions, to fully metamorphose into terrestrial adults.

A. bishopi was described in 1950 and received endangered status by the United States Fish and Wildlife Service in 2008. In its Red List of Threatened Species, the IUCN lists Ambystoma bishopi as being endangered. This is because the population trend is downward, as a result of habitat destruction and an increase in undergrowth. Because of the mismanagement of the regulatory fires needed by Longleaf Pine forests, much of the habitat that this species relies on is degraded to the point of habitat destruction, which is the main threat to its populations.
