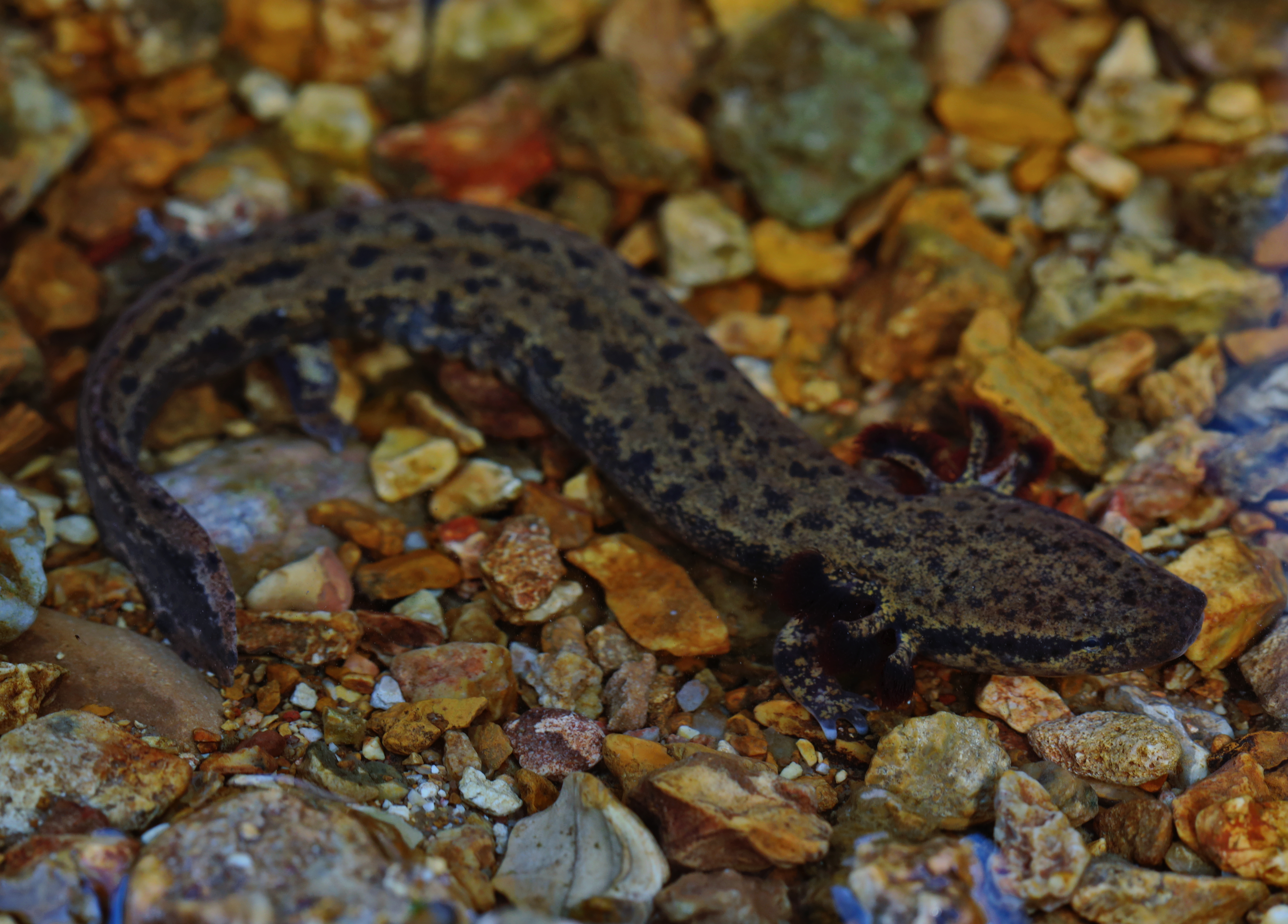

Conservation status
- Least Concern (IUCN 3.1)

- Secure (NatureServe)

Scientific classification
- Kingdom: Animalia
- Phylum: Chordata
- Class: Amphibia
- Order: Urodela
- Family: Proteidae
- Genus: Necturus
- Species: N. maculosus

Binomial name
- Necturus maculosus (Rafinesque, 1818)
- Range of N. maculosus

Synonyms
- Sirena maculosa Rafinesque, 1818

= Common mudpuppy =

Common mudpuppy Temporal range: Paleocene - Recent

Species of salamander

The common mudpuppy (Necturus maculosus) is a species of salamander in the family Proteidae. It lives an entirely aquatic lifestyle in parts of North America in lakes, rivers, and ponds. It goes through paedomorphosis and retains its external gills. Because skin and lung respiration alone is not sufficient for gas exchange, the common mudpuppy must rely on external gills as its primary means of gas exchange. It is usually a rusty brown color and can grow to an average total length (including tail) of 13 in (330 mm). It is a nocturnal creature, and is active during the day only if the water in which it lives is murky. The mudpuppy is an opportunistic predator, meaning its diet consists of almost anything it can hunt, including insects, mollusks, and earthworms (as well as other annelids). The common mudpuppy reaches sexual maturity at six years of age, and in the wild, the average lifespan of a common mudpuppy is 11 years.

== Appearance ==
The common mudpuppy can be a rusty brown color with gray and black and usually has blackish-blue spots, but some albino adults have been reported in Arkansas. In clear, light water, their skin gets darker, likewise in darker water, their skin gets lighter in color. At sexual maturity, mudpuppies can be 20 cm (8 in) long and continue to grow to an average length of 33 cm (13 in), though specimens up to 43.5 cm (17.1 in) have been reported. Their external gills resemble ostrich plumes and their size depends on the oxygen levels present in the water. In stagnant water, mudpuppies have larger gills, whereas in running streams where oxygen is more prevalent, they have smaller gills. The distal portions of the gills are very filamentous and contain many capillaries. Mudpuppies also have small, flattened limbs which can be used for slowly walking on the bottoms of streams or ponds, or they can be flattened against the body during short swimming spurts. They have mucous glands which provide a slimy protective coating

=== Neoteny ===
Mudpuppies are one of many species of salamanders that do not undergo metamorphosis. Most hypotheses surrounding the origin of Necturus's lack of metamorphosis concern the effectiveness of the thyroid gland. The thyroid gland in some salamanders, like the axolotl, produce normal thyroid hormones (THs), but cells in the organism express thyroid hormone receptors (TR) that are mutated, and do not bond correctly with thyroid hormones, leading to some salamanders in a state of perpetual juvenile-hood. In contrast to axolotls, in mudpuppies, these THs are normally expressed. However, it is believed that instead of having TH-insensitive tissues that block the effects of THs, some mudpuppy tissues, such as the external gills, have lost the ability to be regulated by TH over time. This selective insensitivity to THs suggests a normal level of activity in the hypothalamo-pituitary-thyroid axis in developing mudpuppies, unlike other salamander species.

The common mudpuppy also does not have a parathyroid gland. The majority of salamanders with parathyroid glands rely on them to help with hypercalcemic regulation; hypercalcemic regulation in mudpuppies is primarily done by the pituitary gland instead. In common mudpuppies, the purpose of the absence of a parathyroid gland is poorly understood. One reason for the absence might be the lack of variability in the climate of mudpuppies, as the parathyroid glands of salamanders vary greatly depending on seasonal changes, or whether the organism hibernates.

== Distribution ==
Common Mudpuppies have the largest distribution of any full aquatic salamander in North America. Necturus maculosus specimens live in streams, lakes, and ponds in the eastern part of North America. They appear in the southern section of Canada, as far south as Georgia, and from the Midwest United States to North Carolina. Behaviorally, they hide under cover such as rocks and logs during the day and become more active at night. However, in muddy waters, the mudpuppy may become active during the day. Mudpuppies can even live under the ice when lakes freeze. There is an introduced population in Maine. Populations are declining due to habitat degradation and chemical pollutants, such as PCBs and lampricides, from agricultural, industrial, and residential practices.

== Spatial ecology ==
Mudpuppies are shy by nature and prefer habitats where they can hide under rocks, logs, and other underwater debris. Studies have shown that they tend to prefer more shallow water (up to 1 meter) but have also been commonly reported in water with depths of approximately 30 meters. It is assumed that these changes in preferences is due to water temperature, preferring shallow water when temperatures are coolest (late fall through early spring).

== Diet ==
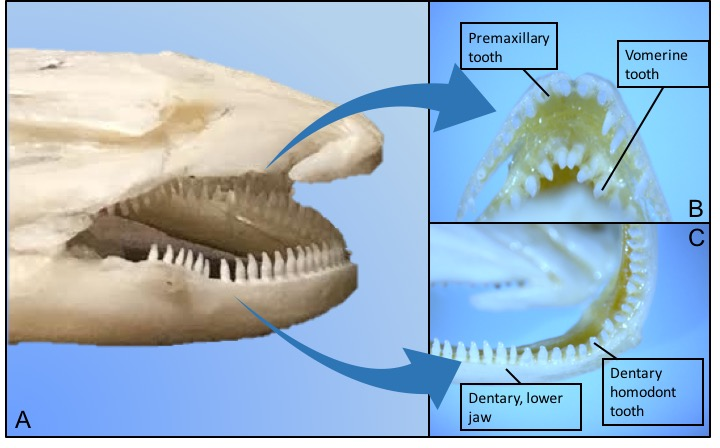
A) Overall view of common mudpuppy mouth. B) Ventral view of vomerine and premaxillary teeth, located on the upper part of the mudpuppy mouth. C) Lower jaw, or dentary from a common mudpuppy showing the homodont dentary teeth. Specimen from the Pacific Lutheran University Natural History collection

Mudpuppies use rows of teeth to eat their prey. Salamanders have three different sets of teeth: dentary, premaxillary, and vomerine teeth, which are named due to their location in the mouth. All the teeth, despite their different locations, are very similar. They are small and conical, meaning mudpuppies are homodonts due to their similar shape. The common mudpuppy never leaves its aquatic environment and therefore does not undergo morphogenesis; however, many salamanders do and develop differentiated teeth. Aquatic salamander teeth are used to hinder escape of the prey from the salamander; they do not have a crushing function. This aids the salamander when feeding. When the salamander performs the "suck and gape" feeding style, the prey is pulled into the mouth, and the teeth function to hold the prey inside the mouth and prevent the prey from escaping. At both sides of their mouths, their lips interlock, which allows them to use suction feeding. They are carnivorous creatures and will eat almost anything they can get into their mouths. Typically, they prey upon such animals as insects and their larvae, mollusks, annelids, crayfish, small fish, amphibians, earthworms, and spiders. Their diet changes seasonally, with stomach contents of mudpuppies being only invertebrates in summer and fall, and fish being added in spring and winter. Their diet can also be affected by size and age of the salamander, with juveniles (under 20 cm) eating less fish and crayfish and more leeches and amphiopods than adults. The jaw of a mudpuppy also plays a significant role in its diet. The mudpuppy jaw is considered metaautostyly, like most amphibians, meaning the jaw is more stable and that the salamander has a dentary. This affects their diet by limiting the flexibility of the jaw to take in larger prey. The mudpuppy has a few predators, which include fish, crayfish, turtles, and water snakes. Fishermen also frequently catch and discard them.

== Reproduction ==
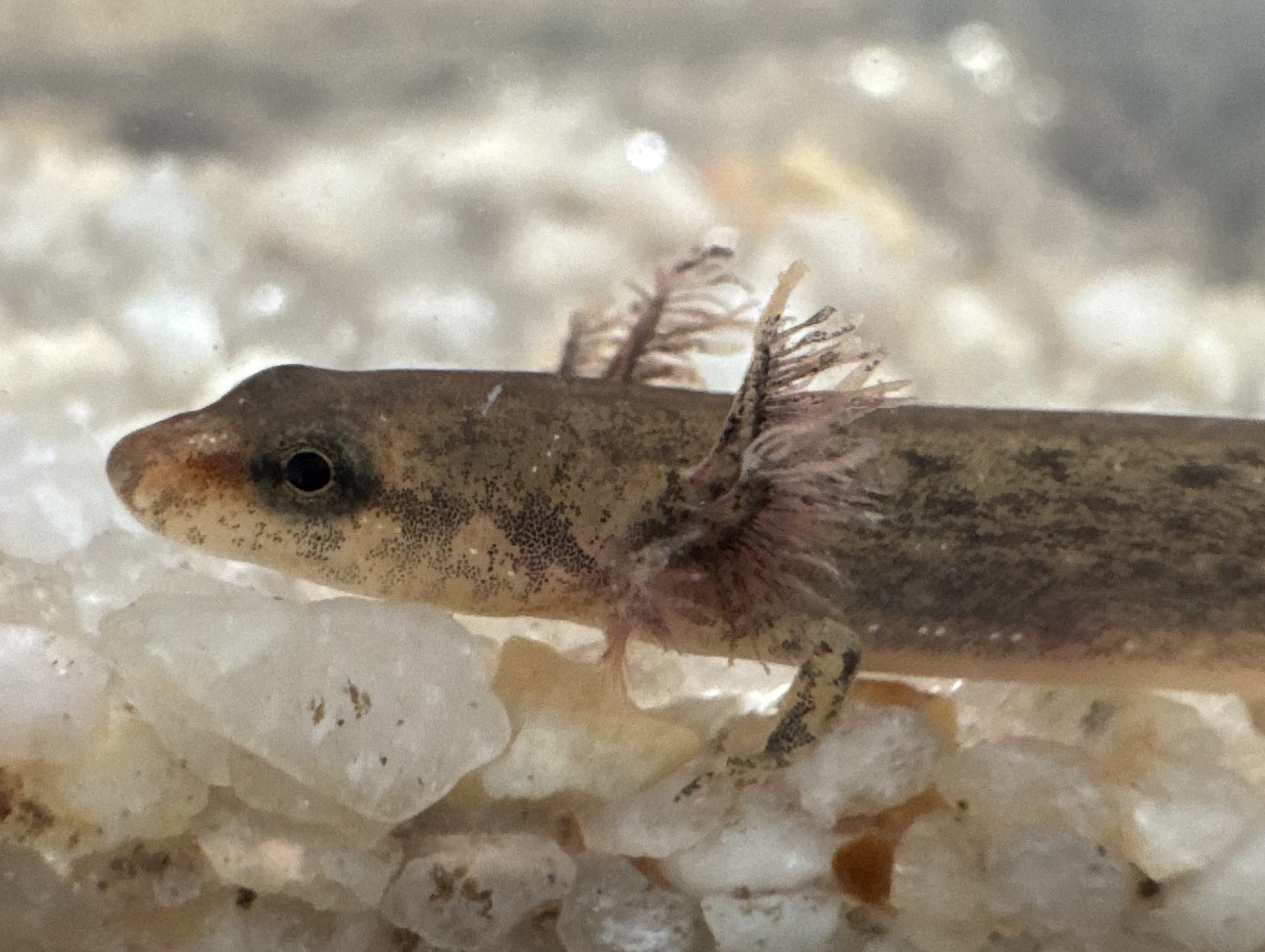
Juvenile Necturus maculosus basking

Mudpuppies take six years to reach sexual maturity. Mating typically takes place in autumn, though eggs are not laid till much later. When males are ready to breed, their cloacae become swollen. Males deposit their spermatophores in the substratum of the environment. The female will then pick them up with her cloaca and store them in a small specialized gland, a spermatheca, until the eggs are fertilized. Females store the sperm until ovulation and internal fertilization take place, usually just prior to deposition in the spring. Before the eggs are deposited, male mudpuppies leave the nest. Once ready, the female deposits the eggs in a safe location, usually on the underside of a rock or log. They can lay from 20 to 200 eggs, usually an average of 60 per breeding season. The eggs are not pigmented and are about 5–6 mm (0.20–0.24 in) in diameter. The female stays with her eggs during the incubation period (around 40 days). Hatchlings are about 2.5 cm (0.98 in) long and grow to 3.6 cm (1.4 in) before the yolk is completely consumed.

== Conservation status ==
The common mudpuppy conservation status was last evaluated by the IUCN red list in 2015, and since then they have been listed as a least concern population. However mudpuppy populations have experienced significant decline in the great lakes due to the use of 3-trifluoromethyl-4-nitrophenol, which is used to control invasive lamprey populations. The Mudpuppy is especially sensitive to toxins because of its permeable skin. It is also killed by fisherman, thinking it is a threat to fish populations, or is poisonous to humans.

== Subspecies ==
Three subspecies are recognized as being valid, including the nominotypical subspecies.

- Necturus maculosus louisianensis Viosca, 1937 (Red River mudpuppy)
- Necturus maculosus maculosus (Rafinesque, 1818) (common mudpuppy)
- Necturus maculosus stictus Bishop, 1941 (Lake Winnebago mudpuppy)

Nota bene: A trinomial authority in parentheses indicates that the subspecies was originally described in a genus other than Necturus.
