= Orthophyia =

Orthophyia Temporal range: Miocene

Scientific classification
- Kingdom: Animalia
- Phylum: Chordata
- Class: Amphibia
- Order: Urodela
- Family: Proteidae
- Genus: †Orthophyia von Meyer, 1845
- Species: †O. longa

Binomial name
- †Orthophyia longa von Meyer, 1845

Genus of salamanders

Orthophyia longa is a prehistoric proteid salamander from the Miocene of Germany. The only known specimen is now lost.

== See also ==
- List of prehistoric amphibian genera
