= Perennibranchiate =

Organism that retains gills throughout its life

Perennibranchiate, in zoology, is the condition of an organism retaining branchae, or gills, through life. This condition is generally said of certain amphibia, such as the mudpuppy. The term is opposed to caducibranchiate. In some cases only a small proportion of a given amphibian population is perennibranchiate, but in other instances a preponderance of the individuals have an adult gill retention. For example, in the case of the Rough-skinned Newt in the Cascade Mountains populations, approximately ninety percent of the adult population is perennibranchiate.

== See also ==
- Neoteny
