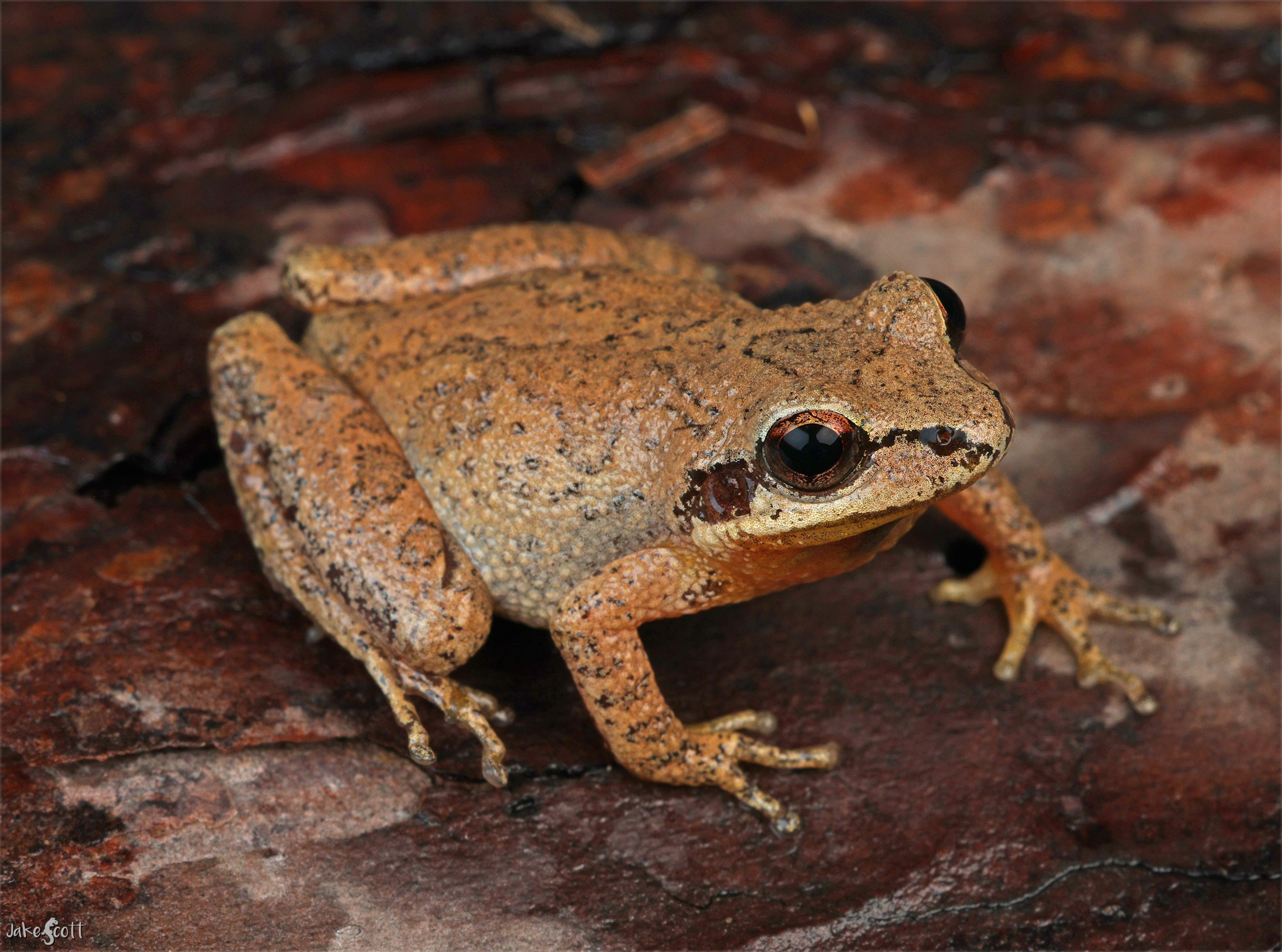

Conservation status
- Least Concern (IUCN 3.1)

Scientific classification
- Kingdom: Animalia
- Phylum: Chordata
- Class: Amphibia
- Order: Anura
- Family: Hylidae
- Genus: Pseudacris
- Species: P. collinsorum

Binomial name
- Pseudacris collinsorum Ospina, Tieu, Apodaca & Lemmon, 2020

= Collinses' mountain chorus frog =

Species of amphibian

The Collinses' mountain chorus frog (Pseudacris collinsorum) is a species of frog in the family Hylidae. It is endemic to hilly regions of the southeastern United States.

== Taxonomy ==
Formerly considered a population of the Appalachian mountain chorus frog (P. brachyphona), a study published in 2020 found significant genetic divergence from P. brachyphona and thus described it as a distinct species, P. collinsorum. It was named in honor of herpetologist Joseph T. Collins and his wife, wildlife photographer Suzanne L. Collins. Prior to his passing, Joseph Collins had contributed many specimens to be used in the study.

== Distribution ==
This species ranges from southwestern North Carolina/southeastern Tennessee, south through northern Georgia to most of Alabama aside from the north (which is occupied by brachyphona), and west to northeastern Mississippi. It inhabits elevations of between 100–320 metres (330–1,050 ft) above sea level.

== Habitat ==
This species inhabits drier and/or more pine-dominated areas than P. brachyphona, which in contrast largely inhabits mesic habitats.

== Description ==
This species is more variable in appearance than brachyphona; although it sometimes displays the same dorsal pattern seen in brachyphona, this pattern can sometimes be broken, or even be lacked altogether on collinsorum. In addition, its call displays a faster pulse rate than that of brachyphona.
