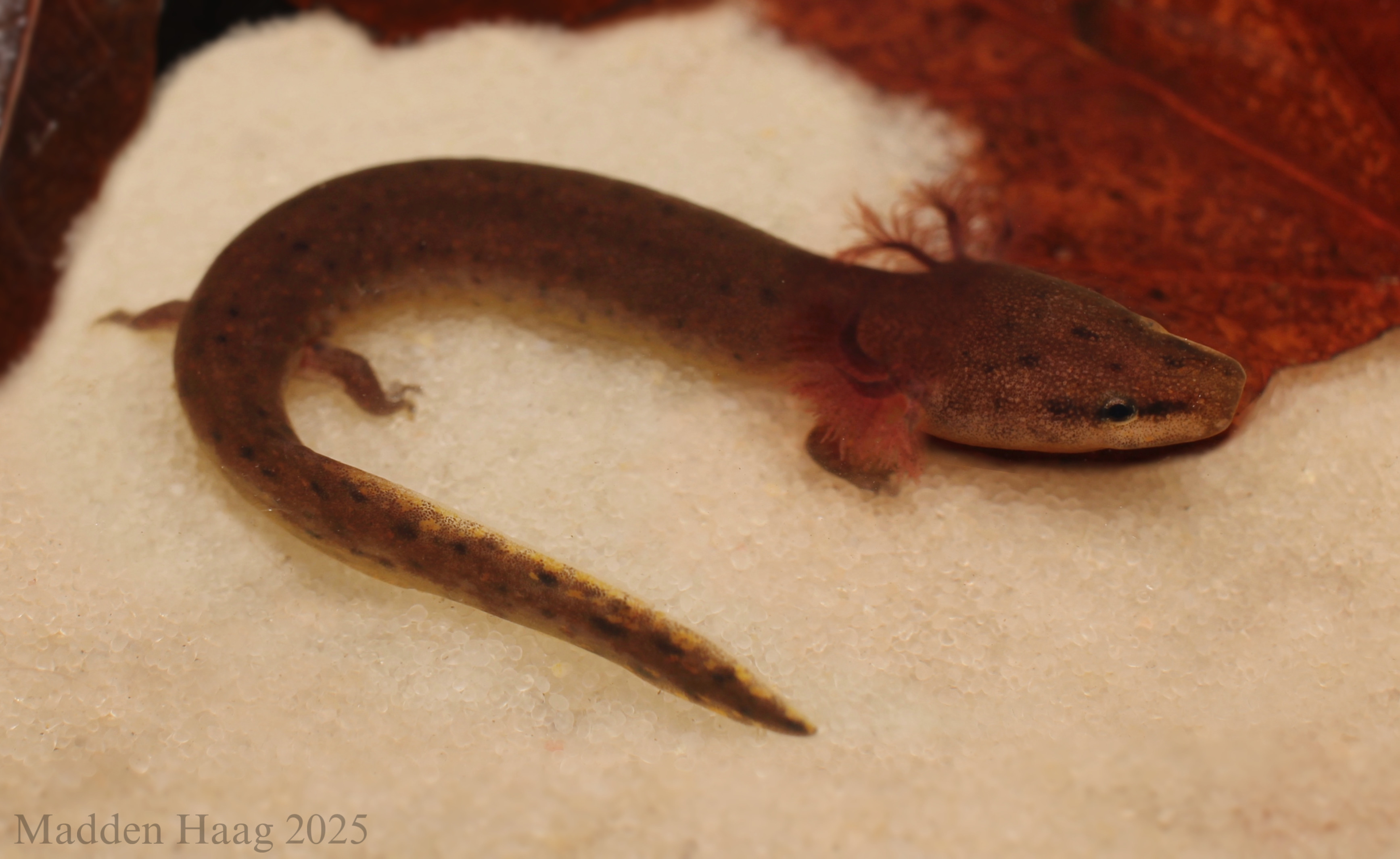
- Escambia waterdog (Necturus mounti)

Conservation status
- Least Concern (IUCN 3.1)

Scientific classification
- Domain: Eukaryota
- Kingdom: Animalia
- Phylum: Chordata
- Class: Amphibia
- Order: Urodela
- Family: Proteidae
- Genus: Necturus
- Species: N. mounti

Binomial name
- Necturus mounti Guyer et al., 2020

= Escambia waterdog =

Species of aquatic salamander

The Escambia waterdog (Necturus mounti) is a species of aquatic salamander in the family Proteidae. It is endemic to the southeastern United States.

== Taxonomy ==
It was formerly thought to be a lineage of the Gulf Coast waterdog (N. beyeri), but a 2020 analysis found sufficient morphological and genetic divergence for it to be considered its own species, and it was thus described as its own species, N. mounti (alongside the Apalachicola waterdog, N. moleri). The specific epithet honors American herpetologist Robert H. Mount.

== Distribution and habitat ==
It is found in southern Alabama and the Panhandle of Florida. It is found in the Blackwater, Escambia/Conecuh, Perdido, and Yellow river basins. Juveniles tend to live in leaf packs until they reach adulthood, where it is suspected that the adults migrate to these leaf packs to mate.

== Description ==
In contrast to N. beyeri, and much like N. moleri, it is small in size, weakly spotted, and has an unstriped larva that lacks the numerous white spots of N. beyeri. It has small dark spots around its body, that can be present in some individuals but absent in others. As a juvenile, it is a pinkish-grey color.
