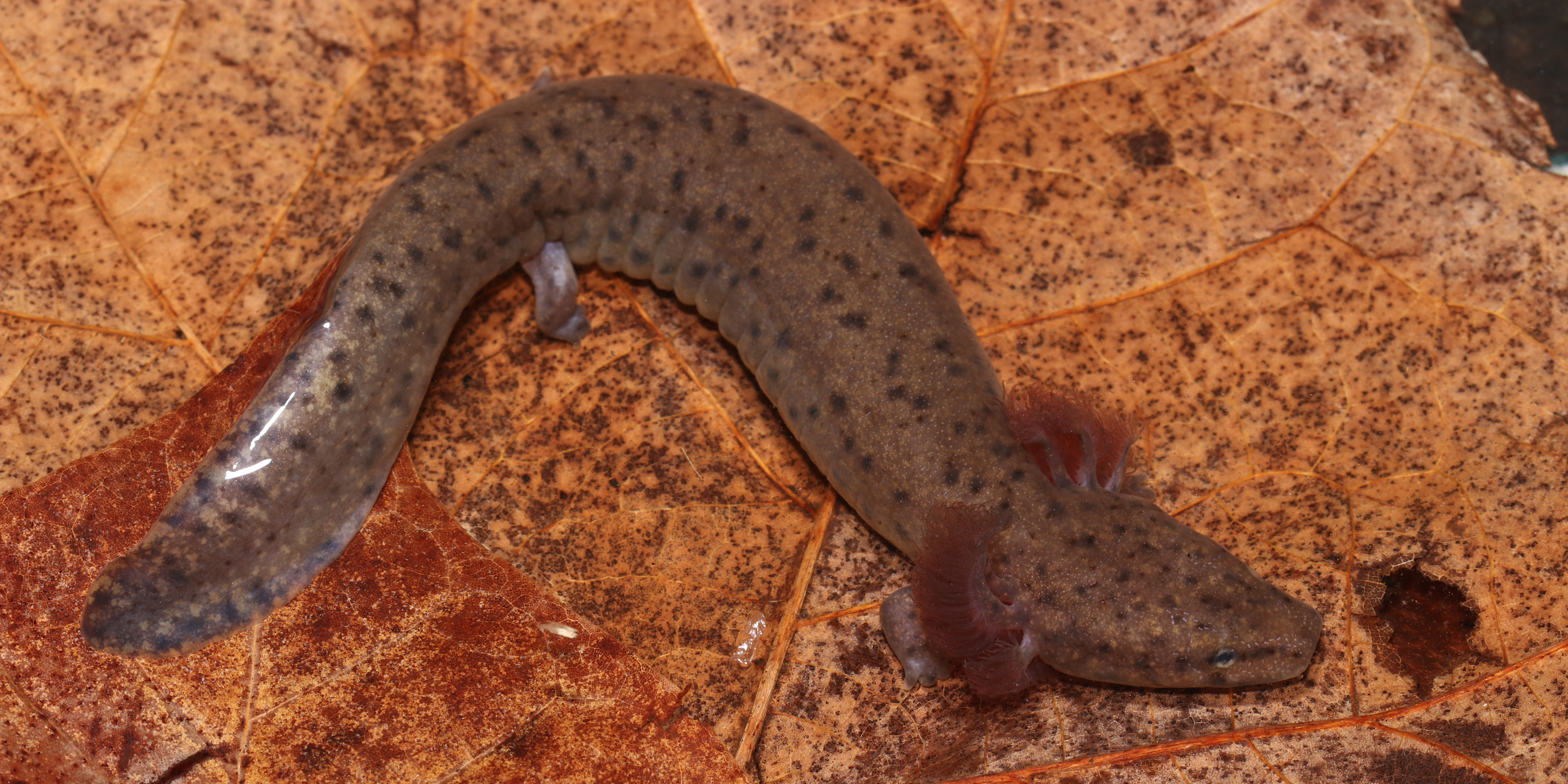

Scientific classification
- Domain: Eukaryota
- Kingdom: Animalia
- Phylum: Chordata
- Class: Amphibia
- Order: Urodela
- Family: Proteidae
- Genus: Necturus
- Species: N. moleri

Binomial name
- Necturus moleri Guyer et al., 2020

= Apalachicola waterdog =

Species of aquatic salamander

The Apalachicola waterdog (Necturus moleri) is a species of aquatic salamander in the family Proteidae. It is endemic to the south-eastern United States.

== Taxonomy ==
It was formerly thought to be a lineage of the Gulf Coast waterdog (N. beyeri), but a 2020 analysis found sufficient morphological and genetic divergence for it to be considered its own species, and it was thus described as its own species, N. moleri (alongside the Escambia waterdog, N. mounti). The specific epithet honors American herpetologist Paul E. Moler.

== Distribution ==
It is found in southeastern Alabama, the Panhandle of Florida, and southwestern to north-central Georgia. It is found in the Apalachicola, Chipola, Choctawhatchee/Pea, Econfina, and Ochlockonee river basins.

== Description ==
In contrast to N. beyeri, it is small in size, weakly spotted, and has an unstriped larva that lacks the numerous white spots of N. beyeri. It shares these phenotypic traits with N. mounti, although it is genetically distinct.
