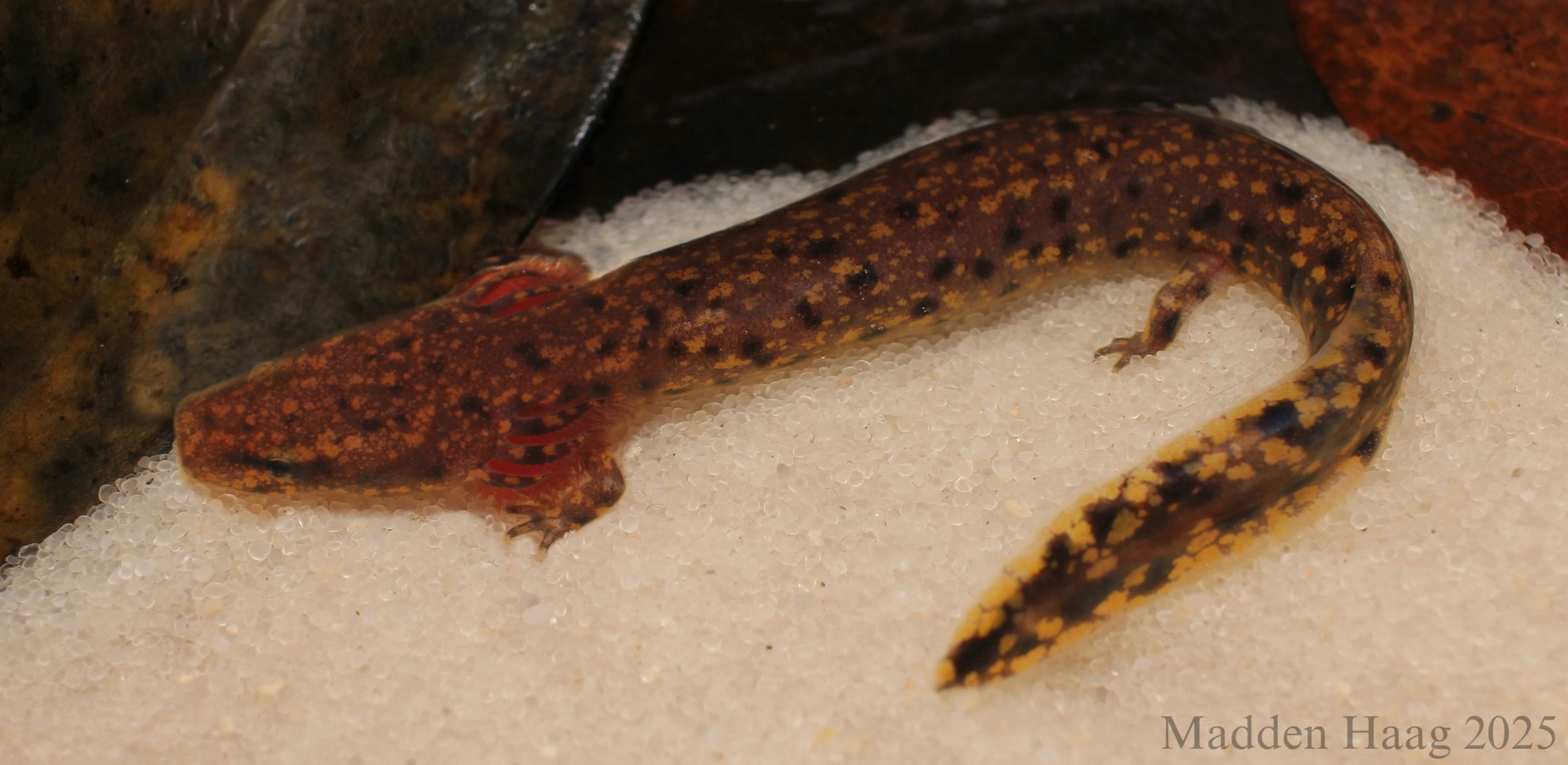
- Necturus beyeri

Conservation status
- Least Concern (IUCN 3.1)

Scientific classification
- Kingdom: Animalia
- Phylum: Chordata
- Class: Amphibia
- Order: Urodela
- Family: Proteidae
- Genus: Necturus
- Species: N. beyeri

Binomial name
- Necturus beyeri Viosca, 1937

Synonyms
- Necturus lodingi Viosca, 1937

= Western waterdog =

Species of amphibian

The western waterdog (Necturus beyeri) is a species of aquatic salamander in the family Proteidae. It is endemic to the deep South, where it occurs in Alabama, Louisiana, Mississippi, and Texas.

== Taxonomy ==
This may be a species complex that could be split into different taxa as research indicates; the Apalachicola (N. moleri) and Escambia (N. mounti) waterdogs were split from this species in 2020; previously, they were all grouped together as the Gulf Coast waterdog. It is closely related to Necturus alabamensis.

Studies indicate that as currently defined, it comprises four lineages: the "Mobile" lineage (ranging from the Mobile River to the Biloxi River), the "Pearl" lineage (ranging from the Wolf River to the Pearl River), the "Pontchartrain" lineage (ranging from the Bayou Bonfouca in Louisiana to the Blind River), and the "Western" lineage (ranging from the Calcasieu River to the west fork of the San Jacinto River).

== Description ==
Adults are 6 to 8.5 inches (15 to 22 cm) in length. It is brown with light brown and black speckles. It exhibits neoteny, retaining its gills and larva-like tail into adulthood. It can be distinguished from N. moleri and N. mounti (formerly thought to be conspecific) by its comparatively larger size, heavier spotting, and the unstriped larvae with numerous white spots.

N. beyeri exhibits sexual dimorphism as males are typically larger than females, which could possibly play a role in mating behaviors and territorial disputes.

== Ecology ==
This species lives in streams with sandy bottoms. It remains on the substrate or burrows into it, sometimes hiding in debris.

Individuals of both sexes move more during the colder months of the year and seem to use one site as a home area from which they occasionally exhibit long-distance movements.

The female attaches its eggs to aquatic debris.
