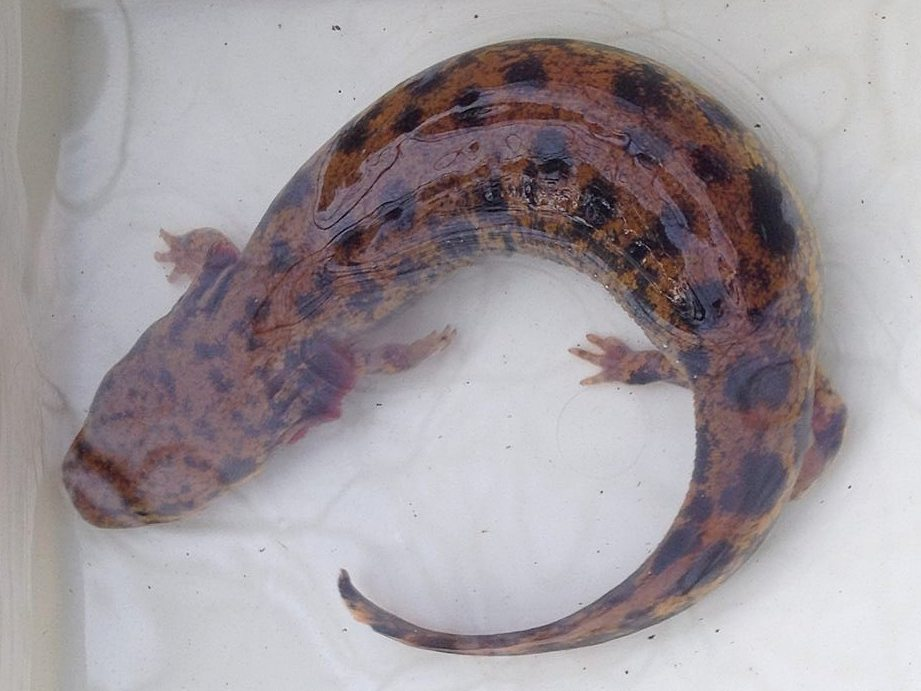

Conservation status
- Least Concern (IUCN 3.1)

- Threatened (ESA)

Scientific classification
- Kingdom: Animalia
- Phylum: Chordata
- Class: Amphibia
- Order: Urodela
- Family: Proteidae
- Genus: Necturus
- Species: N. lewisi

Binomial name
- Necturus lewisi Brimley, 1924
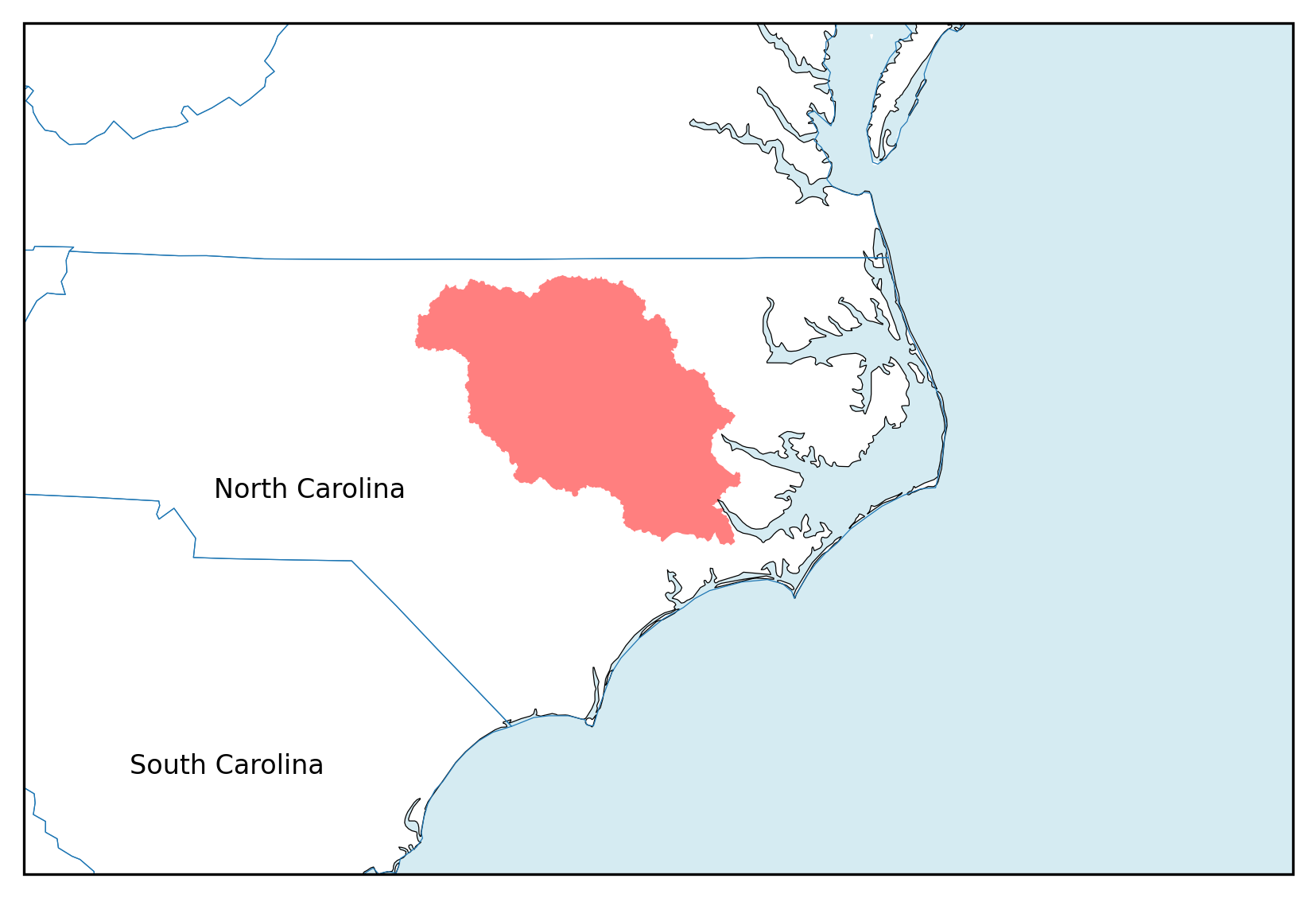
- Current range

Synonyms
- Necturus maculosus ssp. lewisi Brimley, 1924

= Neuse River waterdog =

Species of amphibian

The Neuse River waterdog (Necturus lewisi) is a medium-sized waterdog of the family Proteidae found in streams and rivers in two watersheds of North Carolina.

== Range ==
The range of the Neuse River waterdog is limited to the Neuse and Tar-Pamlico River basins in the eastern Piedmont and Coastal Plain of North Carolina.

== Appearance and physiology ==
N. lewisi has a rusty-brown dorsal side with many large, bluish-black spots. The ventral side is dark brown to grey and also spotted. The snout is compressed dorsally and truncated. The tail is compressed laterally and ridged. Each hind limb has four toes, and the gills are dull red and bushy. Sexually active males have sowled cloacae and two enlarged cloacal papillae that point to the rear. Males and females are of a similar size. Adults measure 16.5–28.0 cm from the tip of snout to tip of tail. The young possess a dorsal stripe along their length along with a dark lateral stripe.

Males and females become sexually mature after reaching 102 mm and 100 mm, respectively, measured from tip of the snout to the posterior end of the cloaca. This size is reached at 5.5 years in males and 6.5 years in females.

== Habitat ==
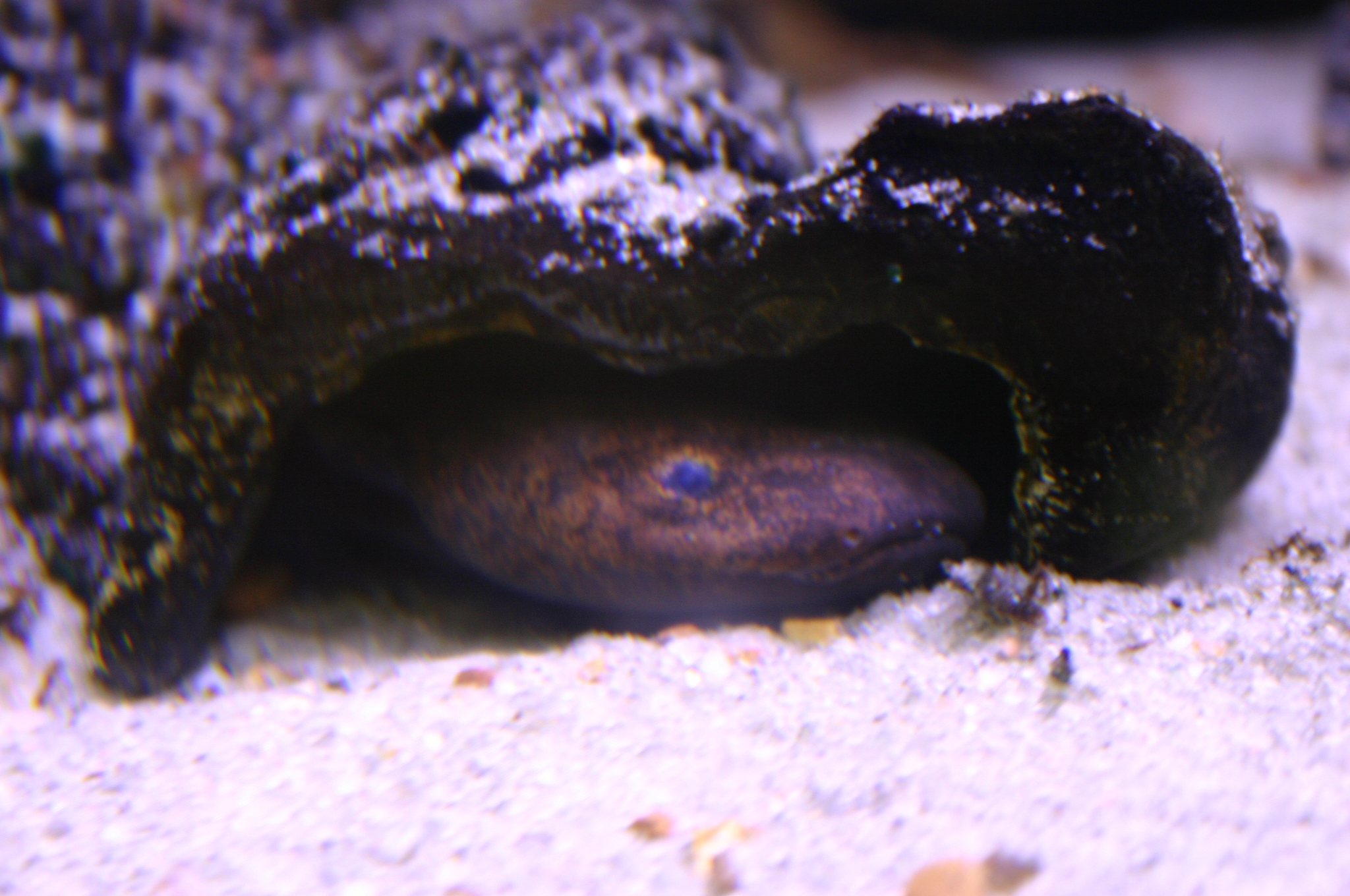

Neuse River waterdogs prefer streams with a flow >10 cm/s and streams which are >15 m wide. The species is generally restricted to larger, fifth-order or bigger streams, as smaller ones are typically unsuitable. Surveys have recorded waterdogs in stream segments 7 to 84 meters wide and 1 m deep, in areas with a hard clay or soil bottom, as well as areas covered with leaf bed. Larvae are found in leaf beds of quieter waters which provide cover and foraging sites. Males have a greater range than females, and both males and females increase their range after moderate rains, but decrease it after large rains (>40 mm). During winter, adults mostly reside in burrows in banks or under granite rocks. During the spring, the adults move to large bedrock outcrops or beneath large boulders in relatively fast current where nesting occurs. Home ranges contain animal burrows or rock overhangs, large flat rocks on sand gravel substrates, and slack-water areas with detritus mats of leaves.

Adults create retreats by shoveling sand and gravel with their snouts, forming a cavity beneath cover objects. Sometimes, gravel is picked up in the mouth and moved to the periphery of the retreat. Entrances to these retreats face downstream. Females, and to a lesser extent males, actively defend their retreats from intruders. Threat displays include flaring and pulsating the gills and curling the upper lip. Intruders which do not flee after this display are attacked and bitten, usually on the end of the tail.

== Reproduction ==
Males have sperm in the vasa deferentia from November through May, and females have been found with this sperm from December through May. Females move to nesting sites beneath fast-moving current during the spring. They lay eggs under rocks or woody debris. Oviposition occurs in April and May, corresponding to the time when ovarian eggs reach their maximum size. Eggs are 8–9 mm in diameter and attach to the substrate by a blunt stalk. Larvae hatch around June and reach sexual maturity at 5.5 to 6.5 years old.

=== Courtship ===
A pair of Neuse River waterdogs crawl slowly, with the male trailing the female by 2–4 cm. The male positions his snout behind the rear legs of the female when she stops. The female has her gills flared, while the male has his close to the neck. The male then moves across her body at the base of her tail. Once parallel, the male begins to stroke the female with his chin. This stroking begins at the top of the head, moves roughly halfway down the female and back to the head. The female then raises her head each time the male's chin contacts her neck or head. This sequence repeats many times over a period of roughly 18 minutes. The male then circles the female in a clockwise direction while maintaining contact with her. After several slow circles are made, the males moves parallel to the female and places his limbs over her back. The pair remains in this position for 30 minutes and retreats.

== Diet and feeding ==
Adults feed from the mouths of their retreats or move about in search of prey at night. Olfaction and sight play important roles in locating food. Animals are active away from cover at night, and also during raised water levels and increased turbidity. Individuals are inactive when stream temperatures exceed 18 °C.

Adults mainly prey on snails, earthworms, isopods, amphipods, mayflies, stoneflies, caddisflies, true flies, and fish. Other prey include: slugs, leeches, spiders, crayfish, centipedes, millipedes, odonates, hellgrammites, beetles, caterpillars, and salamanders. Prey of larvae are mainly ostracods, copepods, mayflies, true flies, and beetles. Other prey items of larva include: earthworms, caldocerans, isopods, amphipods, collembolans, odonates, and stoneflies along with other insects.

== Predation ==
Mainly preyed on by fish, Neuse River waterdogs produce chemical defenses to ward off these predators.

== Conservation ==
While the Neuse River waterdog is overall ranked of least concern by the International Union for Conservation of Nature, they are assessed as having a decreasing population trend. Predominant threats to the species are habitat degradation and destruction due to agricultural pollution, development and humans' modification of streams by channelization and impoundment. The U.S. Fish and Wildlife Service declared the Neuse River waterdog a federally threatened species under the Endangered Species Act of 1973 in 2021, with designation of critical habitat. The Neuse River basin has lost about 40% of its historical distribution, while the Tar-Pamlico basin has lost about 30% due to development and drought. Also, research has found that extinction risk at a given site increases with both drought and the amount of nearby urban development. Some populations near rapidly growing cities potentially already committed to disappearing even though some adults can still be found there.
