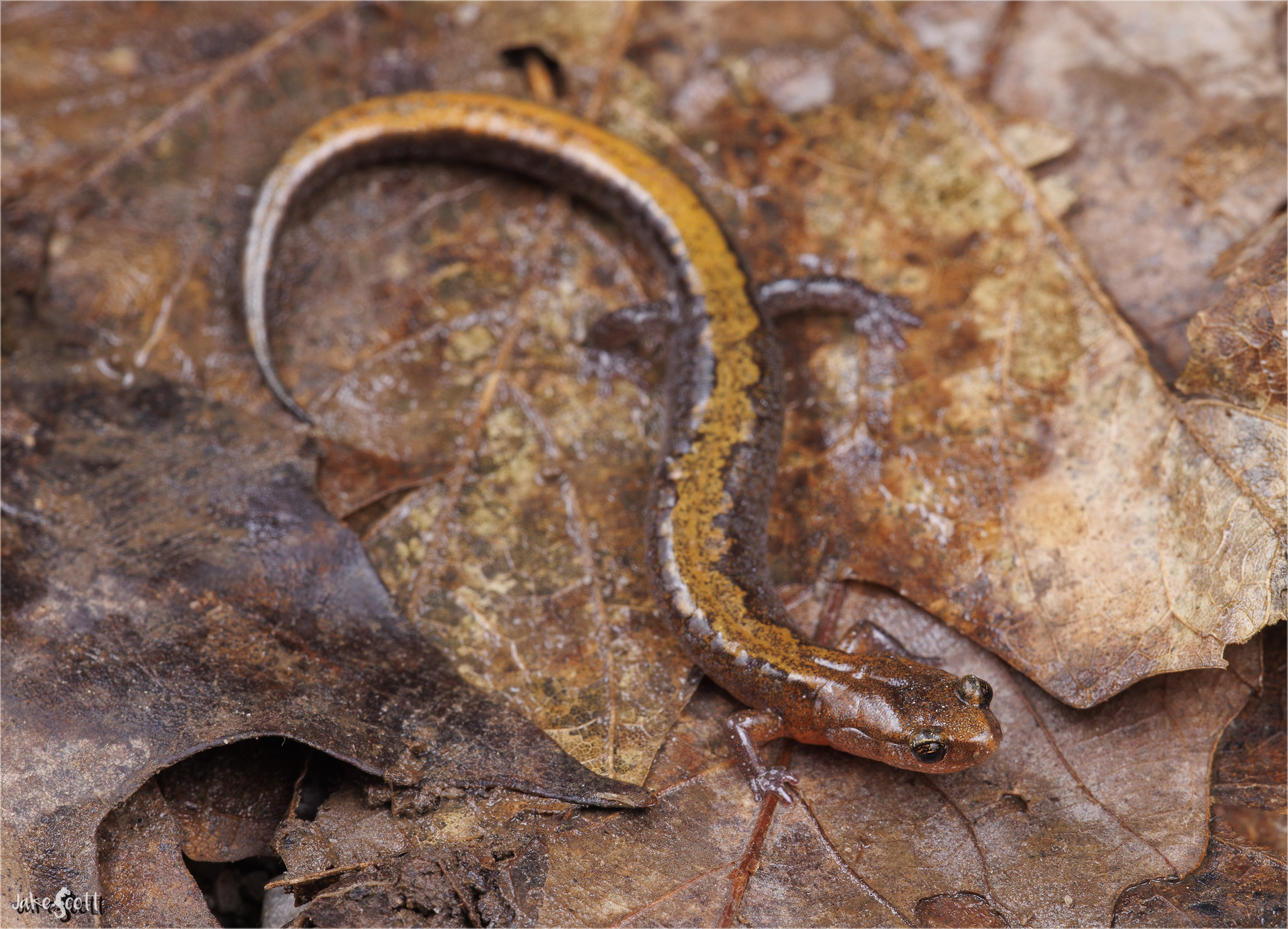

Conservation status
- Least Concern (IUCN 3.1)

Scientific classification
- Kingdom: Animalia
- Phylum: Chordata
- Class: Amphibia
- Order: Urodela
- Family: Plethodontidae
- Genus: Plethodon
- Species: P. ventralis

Binomial name
- Plethodon ventralis Highton, 1997

= Southern zigzag salamander =

Species of amphibian

The southern zigzag salamander (Plethodon ventralis) is a species of salamander in the family Plethodontidae. It is endemic to the United States.

== Habitat ==
Its natural habitats are temperate forests, freshwater springs, rocky areas, and caves.

== Reproduction ==
Adult females lay their eggs in caves during the summer.

== Conservation status ==
It is threatened by habitat loss.
