= Sherman C. Bishop =

- Sherman C. Bishop in 1935
- Born: Sherman Chauncey Bishop; November 18, 1887; Sloatsburg, New York
- Died: May 28, 1951 (aged 63); Rochester, New York
- Education: Cornell University
- Occupations: Arachnologist; Herpetologist
- Employers: New York State Museum (1916–1928); University of Rochester (1928–1951)
- Notable work: Handbook of Salamanders (1943)

Sherman Chauncey Bishop (November 18, 1887 – May 28, 1951) was an American arachnologist and herpetologist who was a professor of zoology at the University of Rochester from 1928 to 1951.

His Handbook of Salamanders (1943) was the first serious and comprehensive treatment of North American salamanders since Cope (1889).

== Early life and education ==
Born on November 18, 1887, in Sloatsburg, New York, Bishop moved to Clyde, New York during his childhood, where he developed an early interest in natural history. Despite conflicts with school authorities that led to his departure from high school, Bishop was encouraged by a mentor, Elmer J. Bond, to pursue higher education. He subsequently enrolled at Cornell University as a special student in entomology.

Bishop completed his undergraduate education and advanced studies in zoology at Cornell University. He earned his doctorate from Cornell in 1925 with a dissertation on arachnology.

== Career ==
Bishop began his career in the military and during World War I, he served at the Charleston Naval Base in Naval Intelligence. After the war, he held the position of State Zoologist at the New York State Museum in Albany from 1916 to 1928.

In 1928, Bishop joined the Department of Zoology at the University of Rochester, where he worked until his death in 1951.

Bishop was also a founding member of the American Society of Ichthyologists and Herpetologists.

== Research work ==
Bishop co-authored more than a hundred research papers on spiders, salamanders, fishes, birds, mammals, toads, and turtles. His notable works include The Salamanders of New York (1941) and Handbook of Salamanders (1943), the latter of which is regarded as the first comprehensive study of North American salamanders since 1889 and has influenced subsequent research in the field. Handbook of Salamanders was reprinted by Cornell University Press in 1994 with a new foreword by Edmond D. Brodie, a specialist in salamanders, and updates on taxonomy of the group.

== Personal life ==
In 1917, Bishop married Alice Stoddard, and they had a daughter, Beth Odell.

== Legacy ==
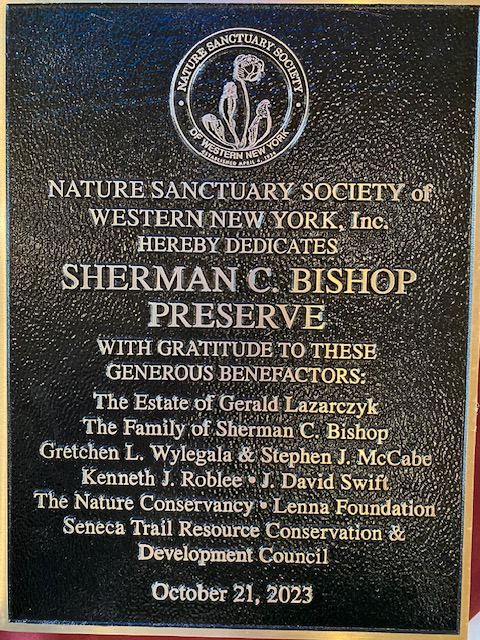
Sherman C. Bishop Preserve

After Bishop's death, his specimen collections were acquired by major institutions. The Museum of Natural History in New York received over 21,000 spider specimens. The Field Museum in Chicago obtained his salamander collection, which was so extensive it required two railroad boxcars for transport and necessitated floor reinforcement in the storage area.

Bishop is commemorated in the scientific names of two species of salamanders: Ambystoma bishopi and Cryptobranchus bishopi. He was also commemorated in the naming of a rare species of widow spider endemic to Florida: Latrodectus bishopi.

In October 2023, the Nature Sanctuary Society of Western New York dedicated a preserve in his honor, known as the Sherman C. Bishop Preserve.

== Bibliography ==
- Bishop, Sherman C. (1943). Handbook of Salamanders: The Salamanders of the United States, and of Lower California. Ithaca and London: Comstock Publishing Associates, a division of Cornell University Press. 508 pp.
