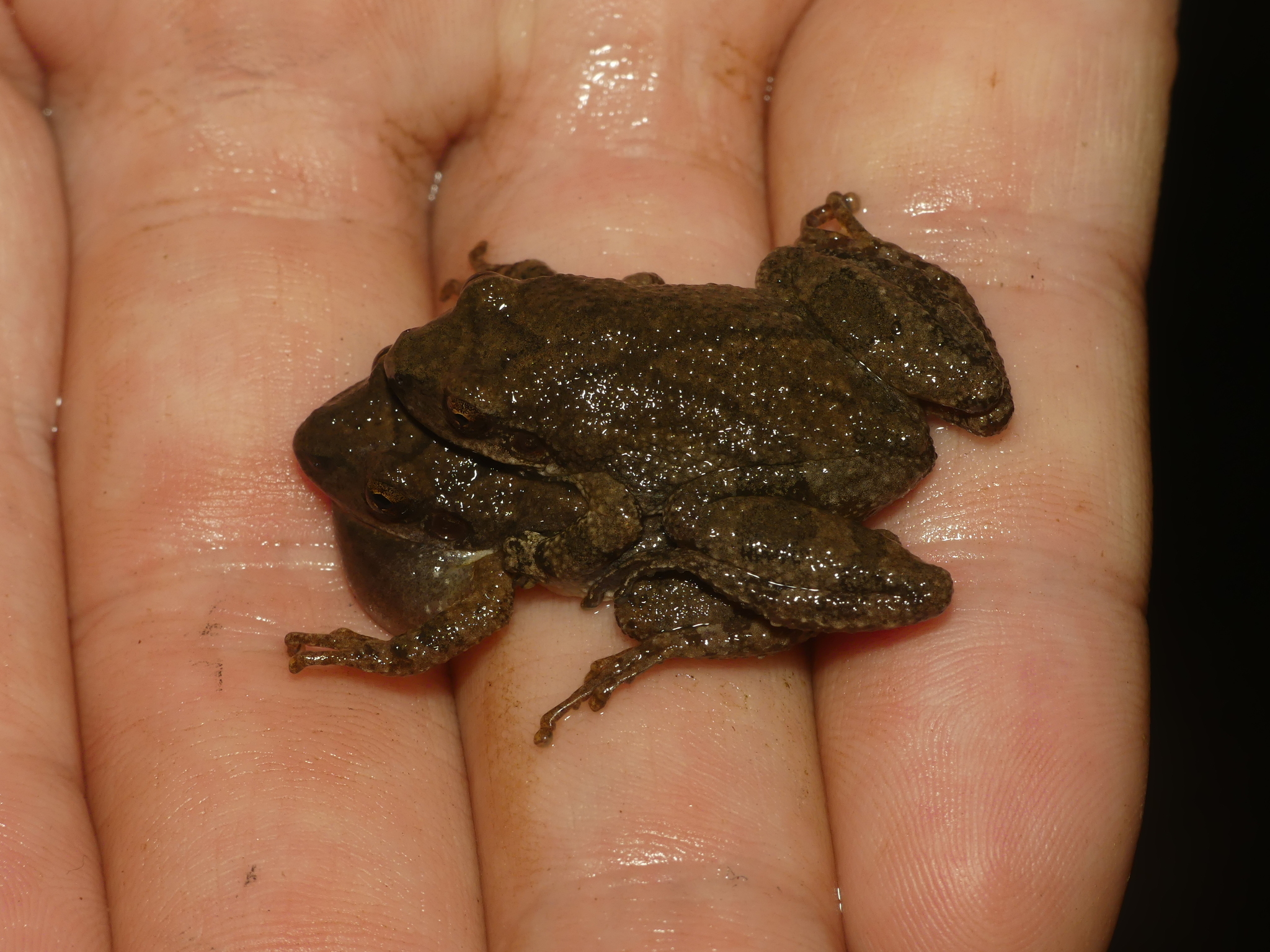
- Pseudacris brachyphona, male and female in amplexus

Conservation status
- Least Concern (IUCN 3.1)

Scientific classification
- Kingdom: Animalia
- Phylum: Chordata
- Class: Amphibia
- Order: Anura
- Family: Hylidae
- Genus: Pseudacris
- Species: P. brachyphona

Binomial name
- Pseudacris brachyphona (Cope, 1889)

Synonyms
- Chorophilus feriarum subsp. brachyphonus Cope, 1889; Hyla brachyphona (Cope, 1889)

= Appalachian mountain chorus frog =

Species of amphibian

The Appalachian mountain chorus frog (Pseudacris brachyphona), formerly known commonly as just the mountain chorus frog, is a species of frog in the family Hylidae. The species is native to the eastern United States. The natural habitats of P. brachyphona are temperate forests, rivers, intermittent rivers, swamps, freshwater marshes, intermittent freshwater marshes, freshwater springs, ponds, open excavations, and canals and ditches. It is threatened by habitat loss in several states, including Maryland and North Carolina, where it is listed as a species of concern.

== Taxonomy ==
The Collinses' mountain chorus frog (Pseudacris collinsorum), which ranges from southwestern North Carolina/southeastern Tennessee south to most of Alabama aside from the north and west to northeastern Mississippi, was formerly thought to represent a population of P. brachyphona, but was described as a distinct species in 2020. The description of this species led P. brachyphona to be given the new common name, "Appalachian mountain chorus frog".

Mountain chorus frogs are part of the family Hylidae, also known as the tree frogs. Tree frogs are one of the largest families in the order Salientia (also called Anura). Because they are so colorful and have many acrobatic talents, they have been called the "clowns and high-wire artists" of the amphibian world. The almost 500 species of tree frogs are found all over the world, from tropical regions to the Canadian woods, and Australia. They are found in places where toads are usually found.

== Physical characteristics ==
The Appalachian mountain chorus frog is a small frog, but of an intermediate size for the genus Pseudacris. It is colored different shades of grey or brown, including sorghum brown, deep brownish-drab, or mars brown. It is stocky in the body and broader in the head, which is very close to the structure and size of Dryophytes femoralis, the pine woods tree frog. As an adult P. brachyphona grows to head and body length of 1.0 to 1.4 in (25 to 36 mm). The males are usually between 24 and 32 millimetres (0.94 and 1.26 in) and the females between 27 and 34 millimetres (1.1 and 1.3 in). The Appalachian mountain chorus frog has a triangle between the eyes and a white line on the upper lip; the male has a dark throat.

== Geographic range and habitat ==
The Appalachian mountain chorus frog can usually be found on the hillsides of southwestern Pennsylvania, western Maryland, southeastern Ohio, eastern Kentucky, West Virginia, eastern Tennessee, and northern Alabama north of the Tennessee River. They live on springy hillsides, grassy pools, and ditches, typically distant from water. Their habitats are mainly found at elevations from about 1,200 feet (365 meters) to 4,400 feet (1,341 meters).

== Vocalization ==
The Appalachian mountain chorus frog has a unique call. It is a faster, higher note, and holds a distinct quality and form. The repetitions are quicker and the pitch higher. It resembles the call of the Pacific chorus frog rather closely but is less clearly two syllabled. When a whole chorus of them are heard, one can tell them apart from other groups. The Appalachian mountain chorus frog's call has a rate of 50 to 70 times a minute and can be continued for several minutes, though they usually stop in 15 to 20 seconds. This distinct call is rapid and can be heard on a clear night up to a quarter mile away. Its voice has a bit of a nasal quality to it and sounds like a wagon wheel turning that needs oil. It is a harsh, raspy "wreeck" or "reek" sound. The Collinses' mountain chorus frog has a similar call but with a faster pulse rate.

== Breeding ==
The Appalachian mountain chorus frog breeds in February through April. The female lays eggs in small, shallow bodies of water in the woods or waterways near the woods. If the frog lives near the base of a hill, it will lay eggs in ditches, pools along streams, or springs. The eggs are laid in groups of 10 to 50. Egg masses are attached to vegetation and total about 500 eggs. The tadpole stage lasts for about 50 to 56 days. Once the tadpoles reach 8 mm, they metamorphose into frogs.

== Food ==
The Appalachian mountain chorus frog feeds on invertebrates, namely insects, arachnids, and nematodes. It is not as adept at climbing as are most tree frogs, as such its diet is mainly limited to terrestrial species like: ants, beetles, cicadas, aphids, leafhoppers and other true bugs, flies, butterfly larvae, earthworms, centipedes, and spiders.
