= Flatwoods =

Ecological community in the southeastern coastal plain of North America

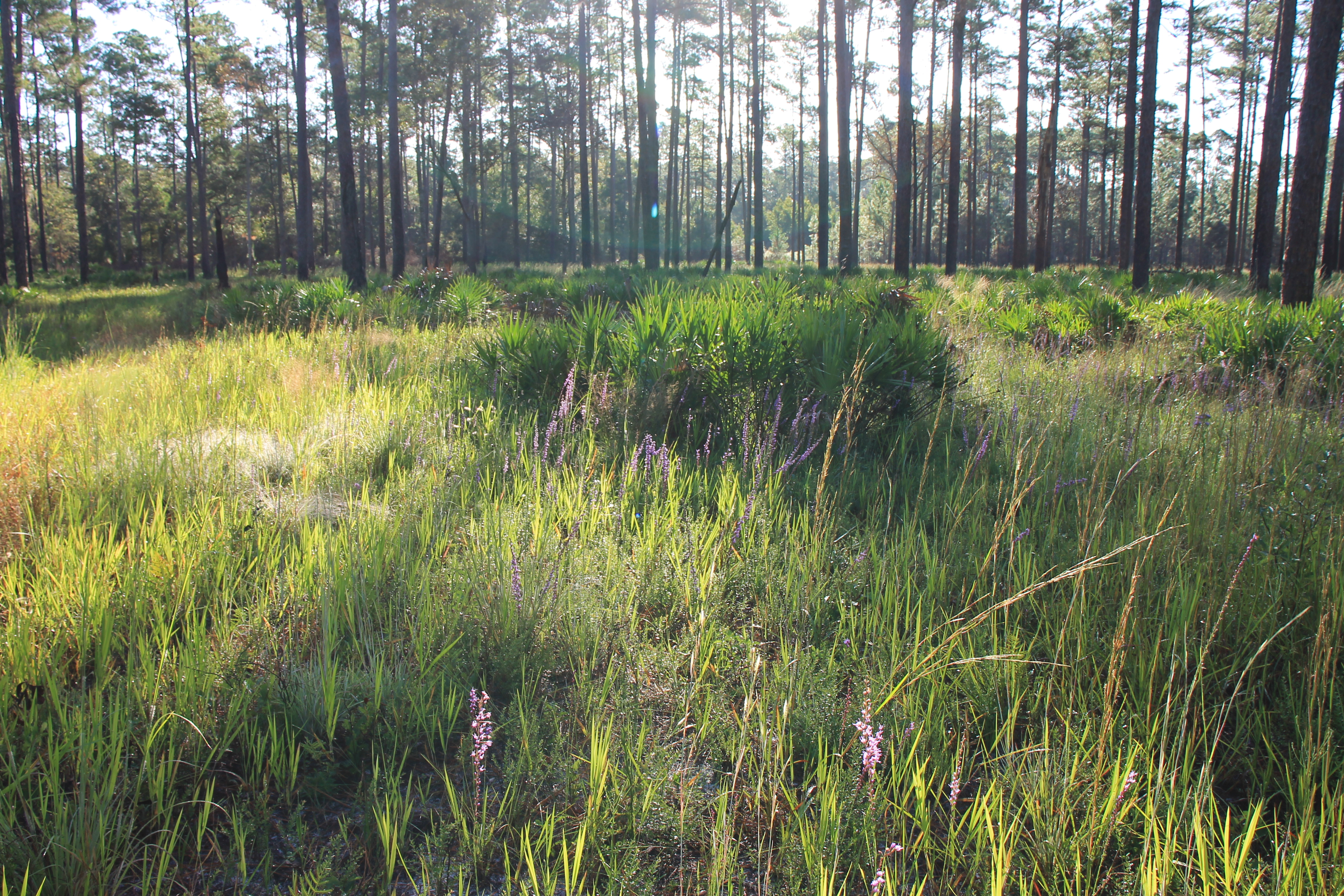
Flatwoods Community at Austin Cary Forest, near Gainesville, Florida

Flatwoods, pineywoods, pine savannas and longleaf pine–wiregrass ecosystem are terms that refer to an ecological community in the southeastern coastal plain of North America. Flatwoods are an ecosystem maintained by wildfire or prescribed fire and are dominated by longleaf pine (Pinus palustris), and slash pine (Pinus elliotii) in the tree canopy and saw palmetto (Serenoa repens), gallberry (Ilex glabra) and other flammable evergreen shrubs in the understory, along with a high diversity of herb species. It was once one of the dominant ecosystem types of southeastern North America. Although grasses and pines are characteristic of this system, the precise composition changes from west to east, that is, from Texas to Florida. In Louisiana, savannas even differ between the east and west side of the Mississippi River. The key factor maintaining this habitat type is recurring fire. Without fire, the habitat is eventually invaded by other species of woody plants.

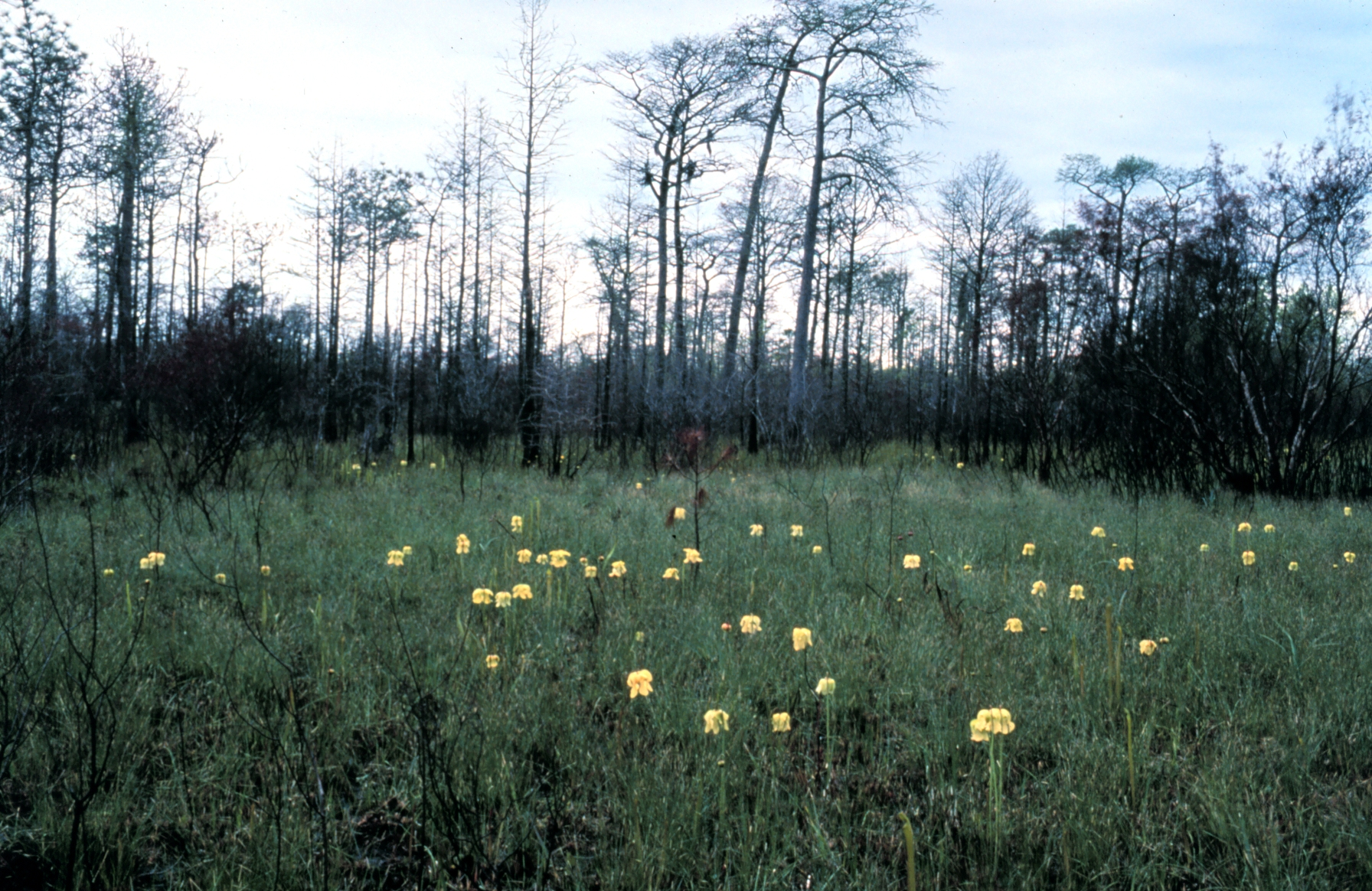
Flatwood with flowering pitcher plants in foreground

A number of rare and endangered animals are typical of this habitat including red-cockaded woodpeckers (Picoides borealis), gopher tortoises (Gopherus polyphemus), frosted flatwoods salamanders (Ambystoma cingulatum), and striped newts (Notophthalmus perstriatus). Many rare and unusual herbaceous plants are found here, particularly orchids (e.g. Calopogon species, Pogonia ophioglossoides), sedges (e.g. Rhynchospora species) and carnivorous plants (e.g. Sarracenia species).

A second key factor is moisture. Overall, wet pine savannas have more species than pine savannas, and the distribution of each species within a savanna is intimately connected with soil moisture regimes. Temporary ponds, and seepage areas, are therefore a critical control on plant species composition. Orchids and pitcher plants, for example, are associated with wetter locations. But even these wetter locations burn during dry periods, allowing regeneration of species of pitcher plant and sundew.

Pineywoods are characterized by low basal area and large widely spaced mature pine. Historically, the flatwoods were dominated by longleaf pine, which can live to be 500 years old. Large scale overharvesting in conjunction with detrimental silvicultural practices like replacement with faster growing loblolly pine has drastically reduced the range of the longleaf pine ecosystem. Longleaf requires frequent fires, ideally every 1–3 years, which prevent invasion of the habitat by other tree species. Decades of fire exclusion in the Southeast have contributed to the decline of this community type. However, with the restoration of fire, and natural flooding regimes, it is possible to restore small areas of habitat. Some private organisations are engaged in such projects. With concerted effort, several large wilderness areas could still be restored east of the Mississippi River. Some of the largest remaining areas of this habitat type are found in De Soto National Forest, Eglin Air Force Base, and Apalachicola National Forest.

== See also ==
- South Florida pine flatwoods
- Longleaf pine ecosystem
- Pine barrens
