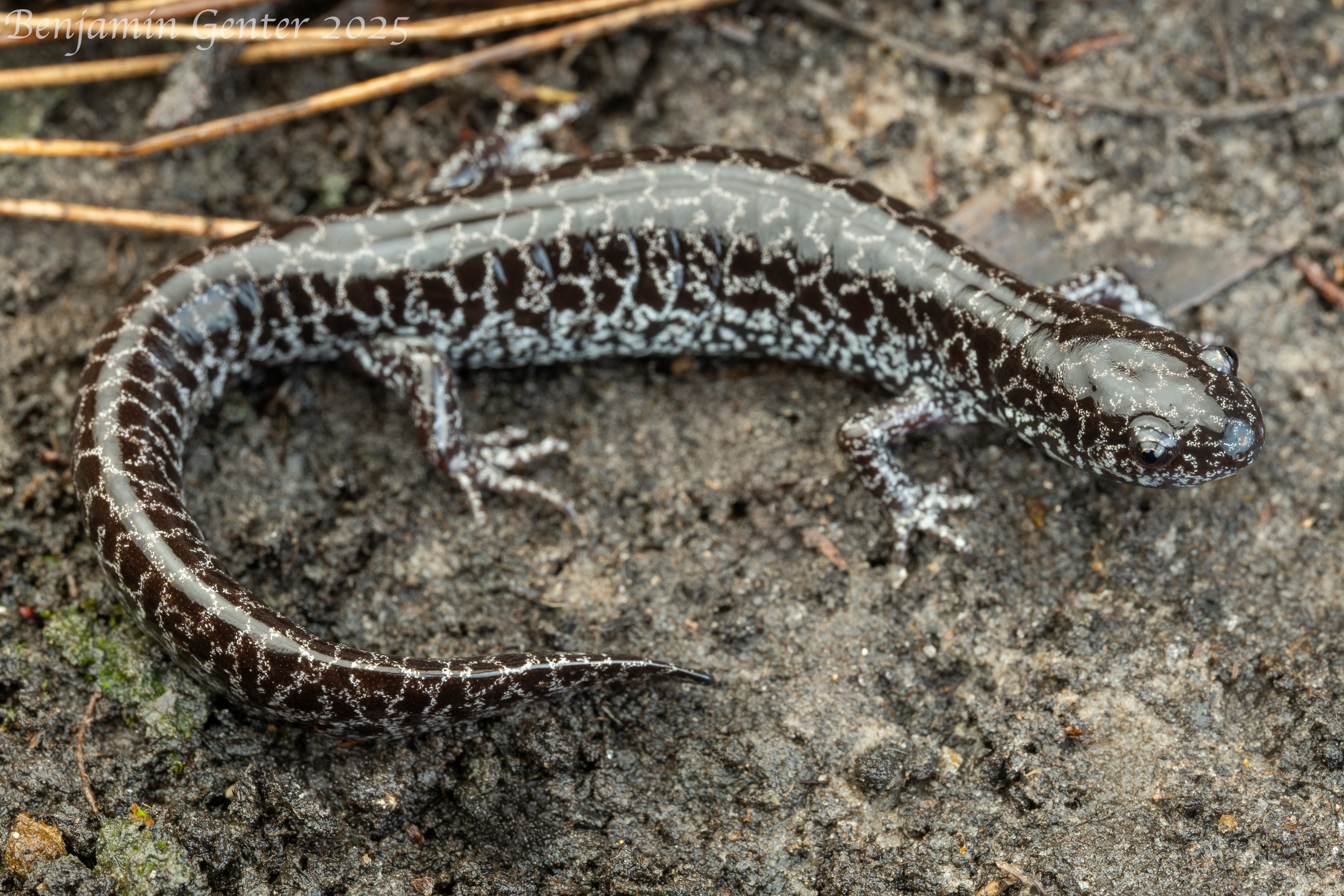

Conservation status
- Endangered (IUCN 3.1)

- Imperiled (NatureServe)

Scientific classification
- Kingdom: Animalia
- Phylum: Chordata
- Class: Amphibia
- Order: Urodela
- Family: Ambystomatidae
- Genus: Ambystoma
- Species: A. cingulatum

Binomial name
- Ambystoma cingulatum Cope, 1868
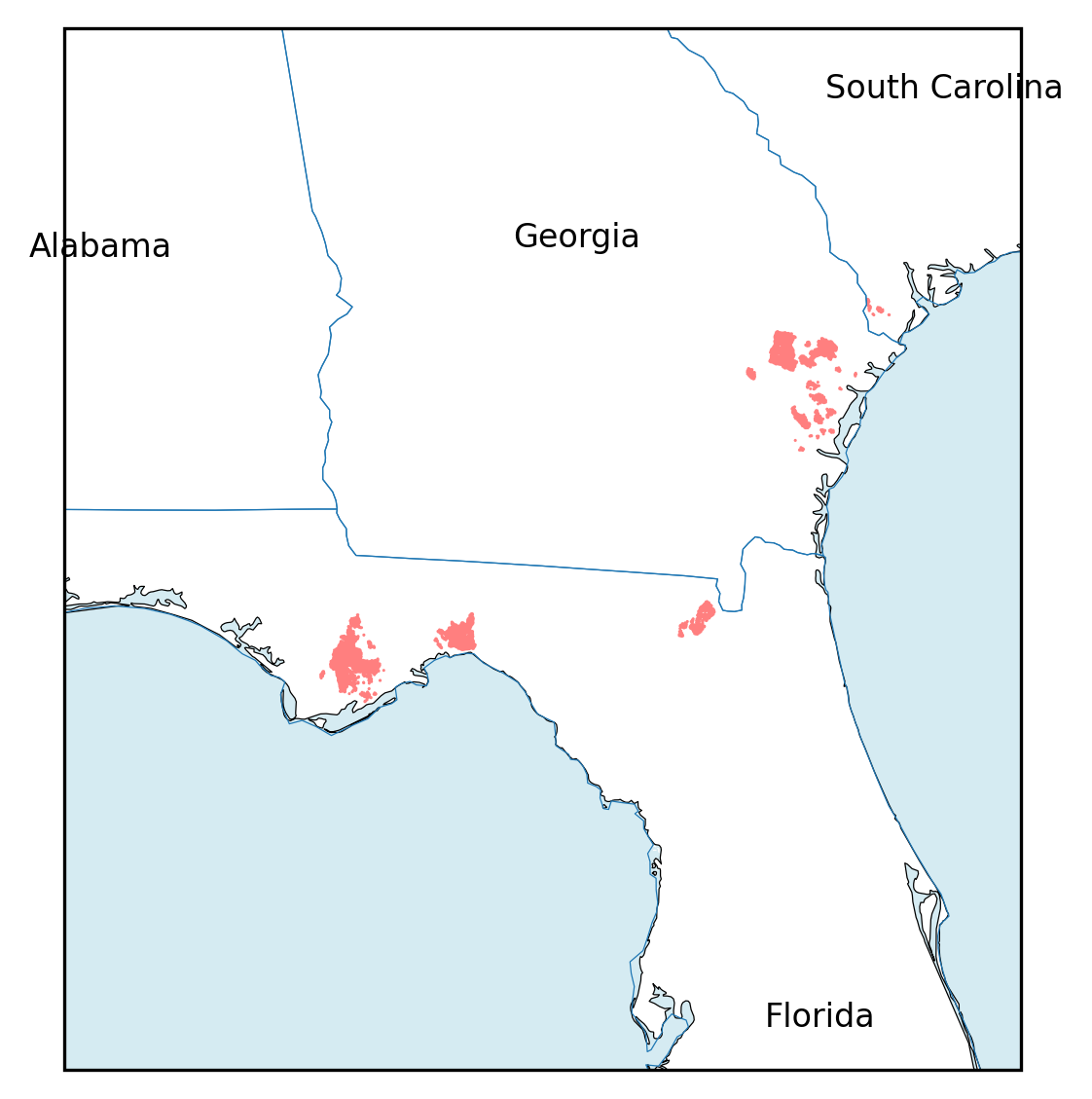
- Range of Ambystoma cingulatum

= Frosted flatwoods salamander =

Species of amphibian

The frosted flatwoods salamander (Ambystoma cingulatum) is an endangered salamander species native to the Southeastern United States.

== Description ==
It is a small (9–13.5 cm total length), elongated species of mole salamander. It has a small, indistinct head, short legs, and a long, rounded tail. Typical coloration consists of a background of brownish- to purplish-black overlaid with narrow gray or silvery-white reticulations (net-like markings), bands, or diffuse spotting. The gilled aquatic larvae are distinctly colored, having a series of bold brown and yellow longitudinal stripes.

== Distribution and habitat ==
The frosted flatwoods salamander has a very narrow geographic distribution, occurring only in the southeastern coastal plain of the United States. It inhabits seasonally wet pine flatwoods and pine savannas east of the Apalachicola River in northern Florida, southern South Carolina, and southern Georgia.

The frosted flatwoods salamander breeds in shallow, ephemeral ponds, generally characterized by an overstory of pond cypress (Taxodium ascendens) and black tupelo (Nyssa sylvatica var. biflora) and a diverse understory of native grasses and herbs.

== Behavior and diet ==
Adult salamanders spend most of the year underground in burrows, especially those of crayfish, where they are presumed to feed on a variety of small invertebrates, but the few existing prey records are mostly earthworms. From September through December, adults migrate from surrounding upland habitats to their natal wetlands during rainfall events associated with passing cold fronts.

== Breeding ==
Courtship occurs within dry pond basins or very shallow water, where the female accepts a spermatophore that has been deposited on the substrate by the male. Females lay 100–200 eggs, placing them in small groups of 1–12, usually within carpets of herbaceous vegetation or in the entrances of crayfish burrows in the dry pond basin. Embryos develop quickly within the egg capsule and will hatch in response to inundation by rising water levels in the pond basins. The larval period lasts 11–24 weeks, with metamorphs leaving the breeding ponds from April to June. Sexual maturity is approximately 1–2 years for males and 2–3 years for females.

== Conservation ==
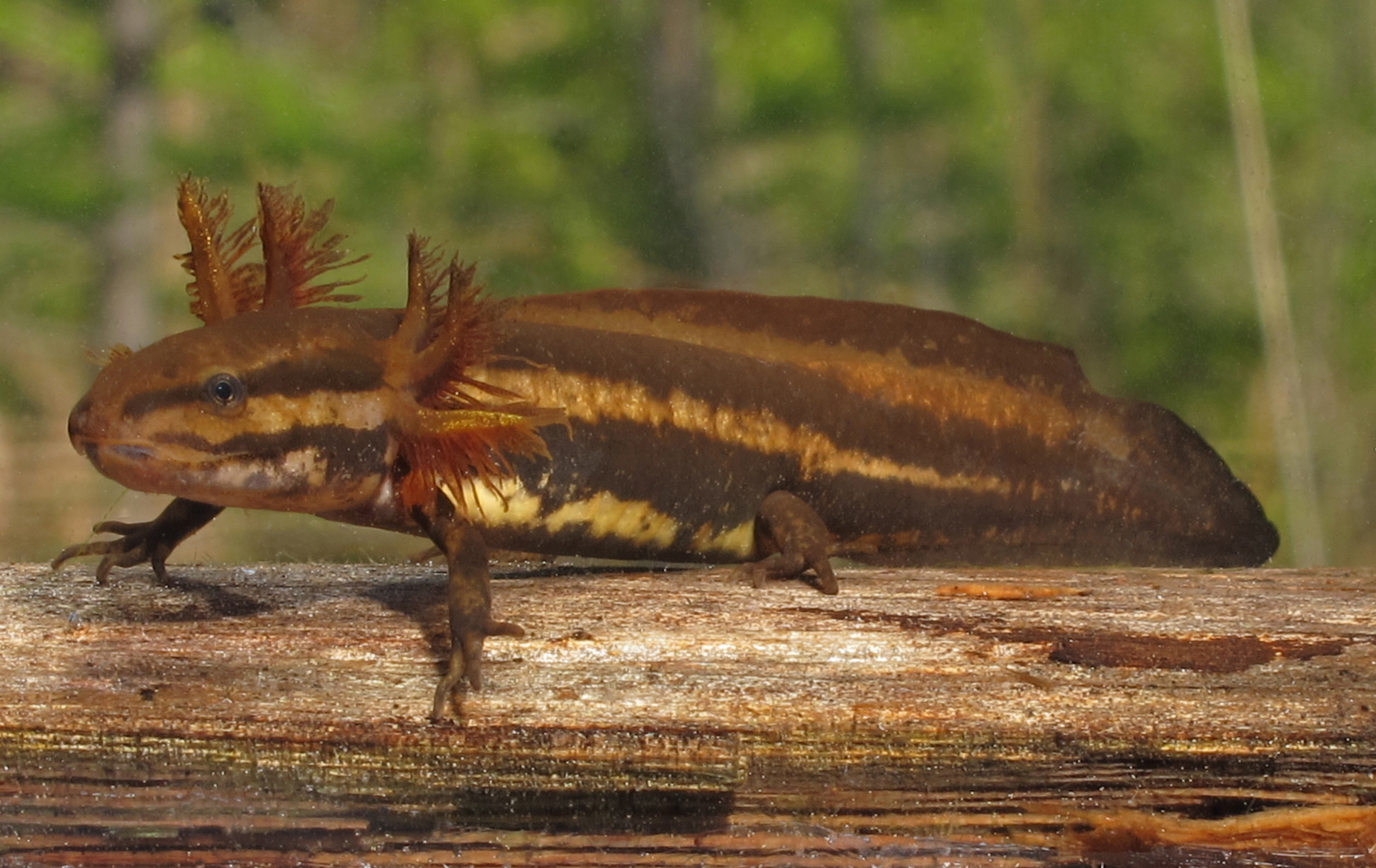
Frosted flatwoods salamander (Ambystoma cingulatum) at an advanced larval stage.

Prior to European settlement, it was most likely a common member of the fire-maintained longleaf pine (Pinus palustris)–wiregrass (Aristida spp.) community, which has since largely been replaced by urban development, agriculture, and pine silviculture. One published study documents the extirpation of a sizable breeding population as a result of a common silvicultural practice of converting natural pine forest to ditched and bedded slash pine plantation. Further degradation of remaining frosted flatwoods salamander habitat has occurred as a result of alteration of natural fire patterns. On conservation lands, a combination of winter prescribed fires and the suppression of natural summer wildfires has caused fire-maintained ephemeral wetland plant communities to shift away from their historic structure, eliminating the plants used as nesting habitat and larval refugia. As a result of these ongoing land use activities, populations are now extremely small, discontinuous, and widely fragmented throughout the range. It is currently restricted to a handful of remaining sites in Florida and Georgia, and has an especially tenuous presence in South Carolina.

The flatwoods salamander was listed as federally threatened by the U.S. Fish and Wildlife Service in 1999, but habitat loss is ongoing. When the species was separated into two species in 2007, the frosted flatwoods salamander and reticulated flatwoods salamander (Ambystoma bishopi), the frosted flatwoods salamander maintained threatened status while the reticulated flatwoods salamander was soon placed on the federally endangered list.

In 2019, a published status review of the flatwoods salamander by the Fish and Wildlife Service showed that the population was declining, which warranted the listing of species as endangered rather than threatened; as of 2026, the status has not been updated.
