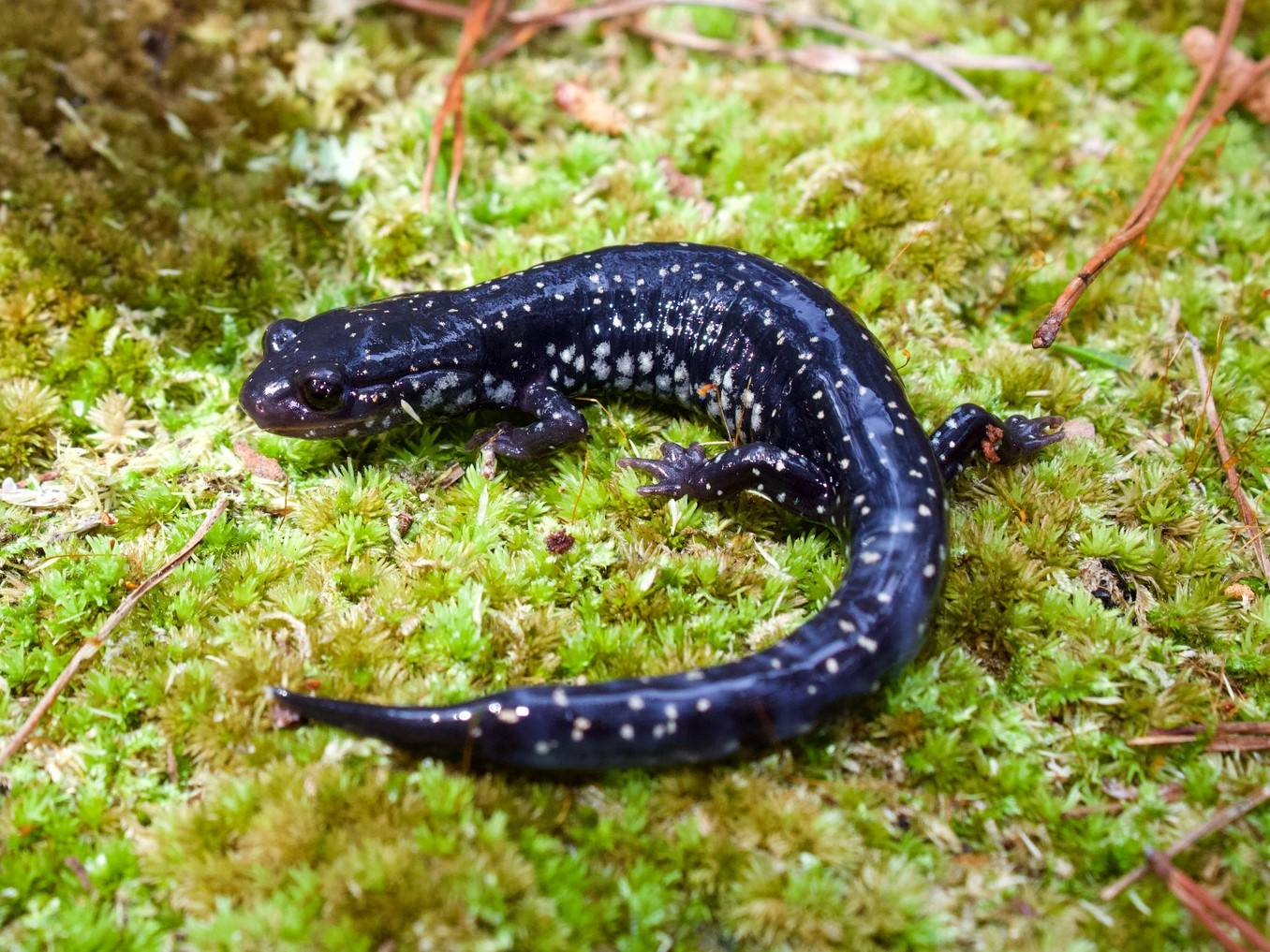

Conservation status
- Secure (NatureServe)

Scientific classification
- Kingdom: Animalia
- Phylum: Chordata
- Class: Amphibia
- Order: Urodela
- Family: Plethodontidae
- Genus: Plethodon
- Species: P. grobmani

Binomial name
- Plethodon grobmani Allen and Neill, 1949

= Southeastern slimy salamander =

Species of amphibian

The southeastern slimy salamander (Plethodon grobmani) is a species of salamander in the family Plethodontidae. It is endemic to the United States, where it is distributed in the Southeastern United States from southern Georgia west to Alabama and south to central Florida. Its natural habitats are steephead valleys, maritime forests and bottomland hardwood forests. Initially identified as a subspecies of P. glutinosus, P. grobmani is named for American zoologist Dr. Arnold B. Grobman.

== Description ==
P. grobmani's length snout to the base of the tail is 49.9 millimetres (1.96 in) with a tail length of 61.3 millimetres (2.41 in). Body width is 8.2 millimetres (0.32 in). Skin coloration is black. The back has scattered gold dots and the sides have large grey dots.
