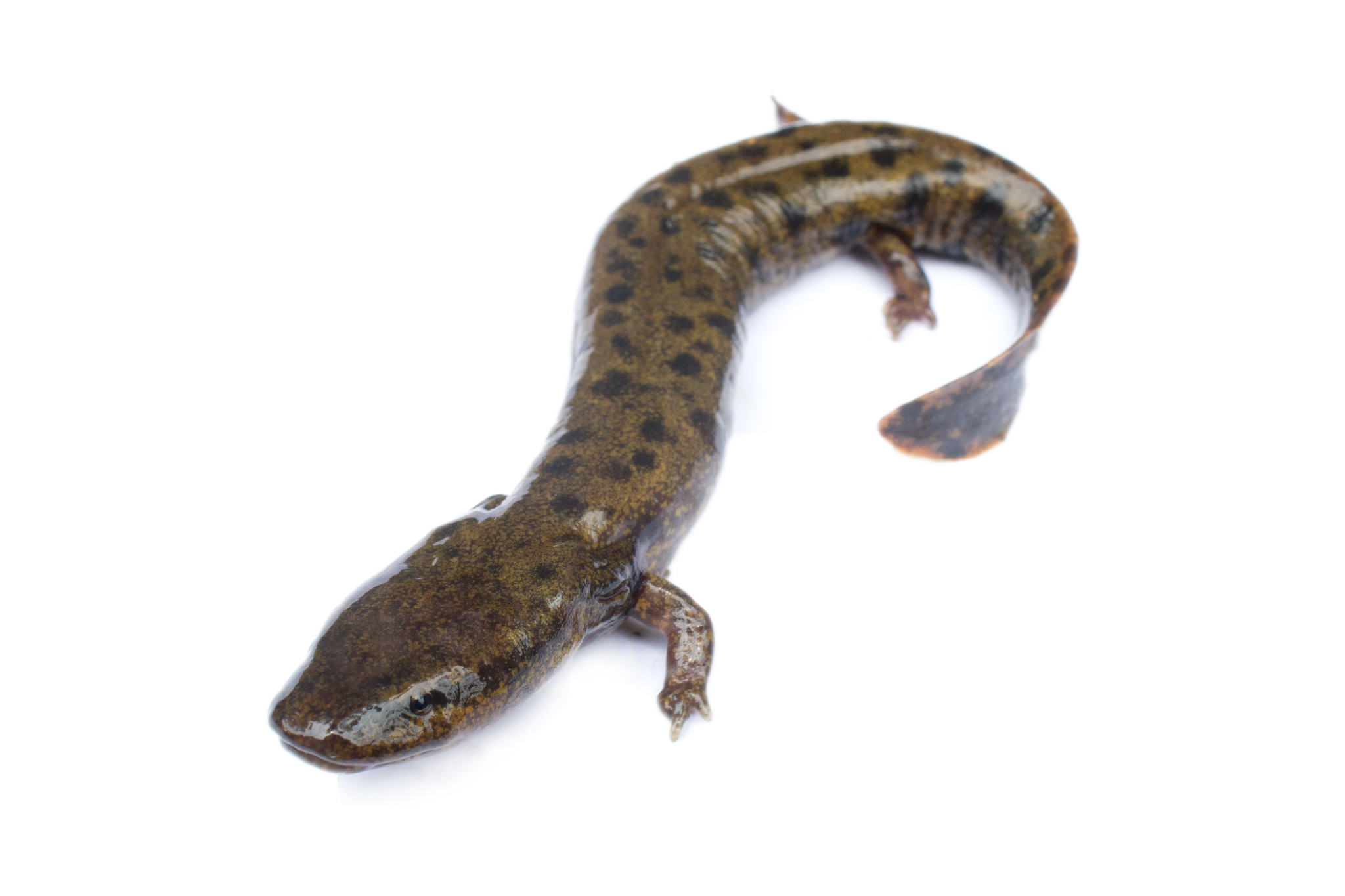
- Necturus maculosus

Scientific classification
- Kingdom: Animalia
- Phylum: Chordata
- Class: Amphibia
- Order: Urodela
- Family: Proteidae
- Genus: Necturus; Rafinesque, 1819

Species
- Eight species (but see text)

Synonyms
- Exobranchia Rafinesque, 1815 (nomen nudum); Phanerobranchus Leuckart, 1821; Menobranchus Harlan, 1825; Parvurus Dubois & Raffaëlli, 2012

= Necturus =

Necturus Temporal range: Paleocene–present

Genus of salamanders

Necturus is a genus of aquatic salamanders in the family Proteidae. Species of the genus are native to the eastern United States and Canada. They are commonly known as waterdogs and mudpuppies. The common mudpuppy (N. maculosus) is probably the best-known species – as an amphibian with gill slits, it is often dissected in comparative anatomy classes. The common mudpuppy has the largest distribution of any fully aquatic salamander in North America.

== Taxonomy ==
The genus Necturus is under scrutiny by herpetologists. The relationship between the species is still being studied. In 1991, Collins recommended N. maculosus louisianensis be elevated to full species status as N. louisianensis. Originally described by Viosca as a species, it is usually considered a subspecies of the common mudpuppy (N. maculosus). However, the interpretation of Collins was not largely followed. A 2018 study identified two lineages (Great Lakes and Mississippi River), but did not draw conclusions about species vs. subspecies status ("Our limited samples are consistent with either interpretation." pg. 360). Currently, the Society for the Study of Reptiles and Amphibians considers the Red River mudpuppy to be a subspecies of N. maculosus, but notes that "its taxonomic status requires further research."

== Species ==
There are seven or eight species:

Image	Scientific name	Common name	Distribution
	Necturus alabamensis Viosca, 1937	Alabama waterdog	Alabama.
	Necturus beyeri Viosca, 1937 synonym: N. lodingi Viosca, 1937	western waterdog (formerly the Gulf Coast waterdog) or Mobile mudpuppy. These two names have been recognised as independent species in the past.	Alabama, Louisiana, Mississippi, and Texas.
	Necturus lewisi (Brimley, 1924)	Neuse River waterdog	North Carolina.
	Necturus maculosus louisianensis Viosca, 1938	Red River mudpuppy. Currently considered a subspecies of N. maculosus.	southeastern Kansas, southern Missouri, northeastern Oklahoma, Arkansas, and northcentral Louisiana.
	Necturus maculosus (Rafinesque, 1818)	common mudpuppy	southern section of Canada, as far south as Georgia.
	Necturus moleri Guyer et al., 2020	Apalachicola waterdog	southeastern Alabama, the Panhandle of Florida, and southwestern to north-central Georgia.
	Necturus mounti Guyer et al., 2020	Escambia waterdog	southern Alabama and the Panhandle of Florida.
	Necturus punctatus (Gibbes, 1850)	dwarf waterdog	from southeastern Virginia to southcentral Georgia.

Nota bene: A binomial authority in parentheses indicates that the species was originally described in a genus other than Necturus.

Two known fossil species, N. krausei and an unnamed species, are respectively known from the Paleocene of Saskatchewan and from Florida during the Pleistocene.

== Description ==
Necturus are paedomorphic: adults retain larval-like morphology with external gills, two pairs of gill slits, and no eyelids. They are moderately robust and have two pairs of short but well-developed limbs and a large, laterally compressed tail. Lungs are present but small. Typical adult size is 20–25 cm (8–10 in) in total length, but Necturus maculosus is larger and may reach 40 cm (16 in).

N. maculosus is brown to gray on its back with bluish black spots. There may be spots on its belly, but these spots range from heavily spotted to no spotting. There are dark red bushy gills. Four toes are present per hindlimb.

== Reproduction ==
Females lay eggs under rocks and other large cover objects in late spring and early summer. Females guard nests at least until eggs hatch. Females forage while nest-guarding, but they may eat some of their eggs as a source of energy if other food sources are not readily available. Larvae are believed to stay under the rock as late as November.

== Ecology ==
Necturus occur in surface waters, preferentially with clear water and rocky substrates without silt. N. maculosus live in lakes, rivers, streams, and creeks. They like shallow waters with low temperatures from autumn to early spring. They are most active in cold temperatures, specifically between 9.1 and 20.2 degrees Celsius. During the day, N. maculosus seeks refuge under rocks or logs and plant debris. They forage during the night and eat a variety of prey, but have preference for crayfish. During the winter and spring, N. maculosus will also eat fish.

N. maculosus are good indicators of ecosystem health. This species has frequently been harmed via bycatch events (primarily passive ice fishing), chemical pollutants, and siltation. Amphibian chytrid fungus (Bd) has been known to affect captive N. maculosus, but it is currently unknown whether it has affected wild N. maculosus.
