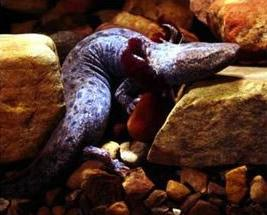
- Necturus maculosus

Scientific classification
- Kingdom: Animalia
- Phylum: Chordata
- Class: Amphibia
- Order: Urodela
- Suborder: Salamandroidea
- Family: Proteidae; Gray, 1825

Genera
- Necturus; Proteus

= Proteidae =

Proteidae Temporal range: Santonian–Recent

Family of salamanders

The family Proteidae is a group of aquatic salamanders found today in the Balkan Peninsula and North America. The range of the genus Necturus (commonly known as waterdogs or mudpuppies) runs from southern central Canada, through the midwestern United States, east to North Carolina and south to Georgia and Mississippi. The range of the olm, the nine members of the genus Proteus, is limited to the Western Balkans. The fossil record of the family extends back to the Late Cretaceous, with Paranecturus being known from the Maastrichtian of North America, and Bishara from the Santonian-Campanian of Central Asia.

== Taxonomy ==
Proteidae is divided into two extant genera, Necturus with five North American species, and Proteus (olms), comprising nine species. A number of extinct genera are known extending back to the end of the Late Cretaceous. Morphological analyses suggest that the oldest genus, Bishara, is a crown-group proteid more closely related to Proteus than to Necturus, suggesting an ancient divergence between the North American and Eurasian members of the family, dating to at least the Late Cretaceous.

Family Proteidae

- Genus Necturus
  - Alabama waterdog (N. alabamensis)
  - Western waterdog (N. beyeri)
  - Neuse River waterdog (N. lewisi)
  - Common mudpuppy (N. maculosus)
  - Red River mudpuppy (N. m. louisianensis), sometimes considered a full species, N. louisianensis
  - Apalachicola waterdog (N. moleri)
  - Escambia waterdog (N. mounti)
  - Dwarf waterdog (N. punctatus)
- Genus Proteus (olms)
  - Stična's olm (Proteus anguinus)
  - Ljubljanica's olm (Proteus xanthostictus)
  - Freyer's olm (Proteus freyeri)
  - Dalmatian olm (Proteus carrarae)
  - Croatian olm (Proteus croaticus)
  - Black olm (Proteus parkelj)
  - Istrian olm (Proteus ikae)
  - Bosnian olm (Proteus bosniensis)
  - Karst olm (Proteus maurii)
  - †P. bavaricus (became extinct during the Pleistocene)
- Genus †Bishara
  - †B. backa (Santonian, Kazakhstan)
- Genus †Geyeriella
  - †G. mertensi (early-mid Paleocene, Germany)
- Genus †Euronecturus
  - †E. grogu (Miocene, Germany)
- Genus ?†Orthophyia
  - †O. longa (Miocene species; potentially synonymous with Mioproteus)
- Genus †Paranecturus
  - †P. garbanii (Maastrichtian, North America)
- Genus †Mioproteus
  - †M. caucasicus (Middle Miocene)
  - †M. wezei (Pliocene to Middle Pleistocene)

== Life history ==
In contrast to many salamanders, proteids never lose their gills during maturation from larvae. This aspect of their physiology is known as pedomorphosis. Despite having lungs, which appear to provide little use in respiration, mudpuppies spend their entire lives underwater. The adult gills resemble fish gills in many ways, but differ from fish gills in that they are external and lack any form of operculum, or covering (note that the similarly-named batrachian operculum is still present, albeit without the opercularis muscle). The bright red exposed gills are often found closed against the body in cool, highly oxygenated water. In warmer, poorly oxygenated water, the gills expand to increase water circulation and provide greater surface area for oxygen intake. Necturus salamanders such as "mudpuppies" also absorb oxygen through their skin and by occasionally breathing air at the surface.

Other distinguishing features of proteid salamanders, as compared with other salamanders, are the absence of eyelids and a lack of maxillary bones in the upper jaw. They show a degree of parental care, tending to the eggs after attaching them to submerged stones and logs. Proteid salamanders range in size from 28 centimetres (11 in) to 40 centimetres (16 in) in length.

Members of the genus Necturus, commonly called "mudpuppies" or "waterdogs", prefer shallow lakes and streams that have slow moving water and rocks to hide under, but have been found in up to 90 feet of water. Their name originates from the misconception that they make a dog-like barking sound. Diet consists of small fish and many invertebrates, including crayfish, snails, and worms. Mudpuppies mature at four to six years and can live to be more than twenty years old. Progenesis is common for mudpuppies, enabling them to reach sexual maturity in their larval stage.

Even though they eat fish eggs, negative effects on fish populations have not been documented. Fishermen have been known to catch mudpuppies, sometimes in large numbers, but most often when ice fishing. Necturus salamanders also commonly feed on mollusks, worms, insects and small fish.

To distinguish between a larval mudpuppy and other larval salamanders, note that larval mudpuppies have distinct longitudinal banding and four toes on their hind legs, the combination of which is not found in most larval salamanders within the same range. The main difference between a mudpuppy and a siren is that, whereas mudpuppies have both front and hind legs, a siren will only have one pair of very small, atrophied front legs.

== See also ==
- Axolotl
