= Percy Viosca =

Paul Percy Viosca Jr.
- Born: June 24, 1892; New Orleans, Louisiana
- Died: August 27, 1961
- Education: Tulane University
- Known for: Aquaculture
- Scientific career
- Fields: Biologist and conservationist
- Workplaces: Tulane University; Southern Biological Supply Company

Percy Viosca Jr. was a freshwater and marine biologist who specialized in the fauna of Louisiana and in the aquaculture of sportfish. He identified four species of native Louisiana iris and experimented extensively with iris breeding, much like his contemporary Caroline Dormon. He was awarded bachelor's and master's degrees in science at Tulane University, where he was also appointed lecturer.

His early career included many scientific publications with taxonomic contributions and life histories of the animals he studied. Later, his interests shifted to methods of increasing the productivity of freshwater aquaculture. His reports on this subject often take examples from his work as a fisheries consultant and the biological supply company he operated.

While working for the Louisiana Department of Wildlife and Fisheries in the field of herpetology, he documented the coastal Louisiana landscape. His work also included mosquito control, riparian and marshland studies, flood control, taxonomic work with native Louisiana irises, newts, and snakes, culture of crawfish and environmental impact of oil refinery practices. Throughout his life, Viosca was concerned with the conservation of wild places in his state. Many of his later publications dwelt on this subject.

== Coastal erosion ==
Percy called attention to coastal erosion in Louisiana in 1925. He maintained that man made flood protection, deforestation, deepening channels, and the cutting of navigation and drainage canals across the southern Louisiana marshes, as a cause for erosion.

He died of cancer in 1961 at the age of 69.

== Selected bibliography ==
- 1927. "Flood Control in the Mississippi Valley in its Relation to Louisiana Fisheries." Transactions of the American Fisheries Society 51:49-64.
- 1928. "Louisiana Wetlands and the Value of their Wild Life and Fishery Resources." Ecology, vol. IX, No. 2 April 1928. Presented before the Ecological Society of America, 1925.
- 1928. A new species of Hyla from Louisiana. Proceedings of the Biological Society of Washington. 41: 89-92
- 1936. The freshwater medusa in Louisiana. Science. 84: 155-156 (with Martin D. Burkenroad)
- 1936. A new rockbass from Louisiana and Mississippi. Copeia. 37-45
- 1937. Pondfish Culture: A Handbook on the Culture of Warm Water Game Fishes of the United States. New Orleans: Pelican Publishing Co.
- 1937. A tentative revision of the genus Necturus with descriptions of three new species from the southern Gulf drainage area. Copeia. 120-138.

1938. A new waterdog from central Louisiana. Proceedings of the Biological Society of Washington. 51: 143-146, pls. I-II.

- 1948. Man-made changes in Louisiana wildlife environments. Proceedings of the Louisiana Academy of Sciences. 11: 29
- 1956. Dynamic conservation. Louisiana Conservationist. 8(7): 2-6
- 1958. Is the sea inexhaustible? Louisiana Conservationist. 10(12): 6-7
