= Carnifex =

Carnifex may refer to:

== Species ==
- Abropus carnifex, a species of ground beetle in the monotypic genus Abropus
- Cardisoma carnifex, a species of terrestrial crab
- Dendropsophus carnifex, a species of frog
- Metius carnifex, a species of ground beetle
- Metoecis carnifex, a species of snout moth
- Phoenicircus carnifex, the Guianan red cotinga, a species of bird
- Polistes carnifex, a species of wasp
- Pyrausta carnifex, a species of moth
- Thylacoleo carnifex, the marsupial lion, an extinct carnivorous mammal species
- Triturus carnifex, the Italian crested newt
- Xenobolus carnifex, a species of millipede

== Other uses ==
- Carnifex, a novel by Tom Kratman
- Carnifex, a unit fielded by the Tyranid faction in the Warhammer 40,000 setting
- Carnifex (band), an American deathcore band
- Carnifex (film), 2022 Australian horror thriller starring Alexandra Park

== See also ==
- Battle of Carnifex Ferry
- Carnifex Ferry Battlefield State Park
