= Sounds of North American Frogs =

Recording by Charles M. Bogert
- Released: 1958
- Recorded: 1953–1957
- Genres: Field recording; natural sounds; animal communication
- Length: 53:21
- Label: Folkways Records
- Producers: Charles M. Bogert; Moses Asch

Sounds of North American Frogs is a 1958 album of frog vocalizations narrated by herpetologist Charles M. Bogert. The album includes the calls of 57 species of frogs in 92 separate tracks. The album was released on the Folkways Records label as part of its Science Series. By the 1990s, the album had developed a cult following and was featured on college radio stations.

Bogert, who was then the chair of the American Museum of Natural History's Department of Amphibians and Reptiles, collected field recordings for the album from 1953 to 1957. His 1960 paper "The influence of sound on the behavior of amphibians and reptiles" elaborated on the themes from the album's booklet and marked the beginning of modern bioacoustic research into Anuran vocalization.

== Background and release history ==
From 1953 to 1957, herpetologist Charles Mitchill Bogert, chair of the American Museum of Natural History's Department of Amphibians and Reptiles, collected field recordings of frog calls in "swamps, lakes, woods, creeks, and roadside ditches" of the United States and Mexico. Bogert compiled the recordings and provided narration for the album. Sounds of North American Frogs was released on vinyl in 1958 on the Folkways Records label as part of its Science Series. The album was produced by Bogert and Moses Asch and the cover was designed by Ronald Clyne.

Bogert went on to elaborate on the themes he put forward in the album's booklet in his major 1960 paper "The influence of sound on the behavior of amphibians and reptiles". The paper marked the beginning of modern bioacoustic research into anuran vocalization.

Sounds of North American Frogs was not the first album to feature frog calls. The 1948 album Voices of the Night was among the first and included recordings of 26 species of frogs from the eastern United States. It was produced by Arthur A. Allen and Peter Paul Kellogg of the Cornell Lab of Ornithology. Folkways Records followed Sounds of North American Frogs with the similarly narrated 1960 album Sounds of Insects by entomologist Albro T. Gaul.

In 1998, on the 50th anniversary of the founding of Folkways Records, Smithsonian Folkways issued a digitally remastered version of Sounds of North American Frogs. The reissue included a 41-page booklet, an introduction by herpetologist Richard G. Zweifel, and a mention of the decline in amphibian populations. The album was reissued in 2023.

== Contents ==
Sounds of North American Frogs includes the calls of 57 species of frogs in 92 separate tracks. A "profusely illustrated" 17-page booklet accompanied the 1958 album, along with an essay by Bogert entitled The Biological Significance of Voice in Frogs. The annotated track listing from the booklet provides the species that can be heard as well as the exact location and date that each track was recorded.

"Scream of the Southern Leopard Frog (Rana utricularia)"
A sample from the album featuring the scream of the southern leopard frog

Bogert's narration describes the production and function of frog vocalizations. Different categories of calls, such as advertisement calls (mating calls), territorial calls, release calls (warning calls), and choruses, are illustrated with all of the families of North American frogs. The narration discusses the role of frog vocalization in species recognition and the effect of phylogenetics on call structure. In a description of the relationship between body size and pitch, Bogert explains that the frequency of the marine toad's call is about 600 cycles per second while that of the oak toad is about 5200 cycles per second. To illustrate, the album includes a sequence of seven calls, with the species decreasing in size as the frequency increases.

== Reviews and legacy ==
Professional ratings
Review scores
Source	Rating
AllMusic	3/5 stars

In a 1958 review of the album in the journal Copeia, herpetologist James Arthur Oliver called its accompanying booklet "the best and most comprehensive review of vocalization in amphibians that I have seen." A 1959 issue of Sports Illustrated praised the album, calling it the "last word in frog recording, not a rock 'n' roll approach but a faithful capturing of solos and symphonies, with a masterly interpretation by Mr. Bogert, the Toscanini of the frog world".

The album developed a cult following and by the 1990s, college radio stations were featuring a frog "call of the day" from the album. In its October 1998 issue, CMJ New Music Monthly named the record its Weird Album of the Month, noting that the barking tree frog's hypnotic chirp "wouldn't sound out of place on an Oval record". A review in Pitchfork noted that the warning vibration of the southern toad "sounds like an outtake from an Aphex Twin record". Musician David Toop, in his 1999 book Exotica, mentions Sounds of North American Frogs as one of his favorites, describing Bogert's narration as "unwittingly comical" and "froglike".

A 1999 review in Copeia of Sounds of North American Frogs by Kentwood Wells found that the 1958 album "remains the most comprehensive work to date, both in the number of species included and the variety of call types presented". The review noted that the dated commentary, such as the old taxonomic categorization and the terminology used to describe calls, could cause confusion for the general public and students.

== Track listing ==
No.	Title	Modern species name	Length
1.	"Individual Barking Tree Frog (Hyla gratiosa)"	Dryophytes gratiosus	0:16
2.	"Chorus of Barking Treefrogs (Hyla gratiosa)"	Dryophytes gratiosus	0:20
3.	"Mixed chorus"		0:50
4.	"The Southern Toad (Bufo terrestris)"	Anaxyrus terrestris	0:38
5.	"The Green Treefrog (Hyla cinerea)"	Dryophytes cinereus	0:18
6.	"The Green Treefrog (Hyla cinerea)"	Dryophytes cinereus	0:36
7.	"Chorus of Eastern Narrow-Mouthed Toads (Gastrophryne carolinensis)"	Gastrophryne carolinensis	1:07
8.	"Voice of Acris gryllus dorsalis"	Acris gryllus dorsalis	0:21
9.	"Mating Call of Squirrel Treefrog (Hyla squirella)"	Dryophytes squirellus	0:24
10.	"Mating Call of the Pine Woods Treefrog (Hyla femoralis)"	Dryophytes femoralis	0:25
11.	"Chorus of Green Treefrogs (Hyla cinerea)"	Dryophytes cinereus	0:23
12.	"Barking Treefrog (Hyla gratiosa)"	Dryophytes gratiosus	0:34
13.	"Mating Call of the Pig Frog (Rana grylio) with Cricket Frogs (Acris gryllus dorsalis)"	Lithobates grylio Acris gryllus dorsalis	0:32
14.	"Breeding Chorus of Southern Leopard Frogs (Rana utricularia)"	Lithobates sphenocephalus	0:40
15.	"A Large Breeding Chorus of Florida Gopher Frogs (Rana capito)"	Lithobates capito	0:54
16.	"Mating Trill of the Southern Toad (Bufo terrestris)"	Anaxyrus terrestris	0:39
17.	"Breeding Call of the Oak Toad (Bufo quercicus) with the Squirrel Treefrog (Hyla squirella)"	Anaxyrus quercicus Dryophytes squirellus	0:25
18.	"Mating Call of Hybrid Treefrog"		0:47
19.	"Green Treefrog (Hyla cinerea)"	Dryophytes cinereus	0:16
20.	"The Mating Call of the Barking Treefrog (Hyla gratiosa)"	Dryophytes gratiosus	0:26
21.	"Mating Call of the Red-Spotted Toad (Bufo punctatus)"	Anaxyrus punctatus	0:36
22.	"Call of an Individual Red-Spotted Toad (Bufo punctatus)"	Anaxyrus punctatus	0:32
23.	"Mating Call of Fowler's Toad (Bufo woodhousei fowleri)"	Anaxyrus fowleri	0:22
24.	"Mating Call of Fowler's Toad"	Anaxyrus fowleri	0:28
25.	"Mating Call of the Southwestern Woodhouse's Toad (Bufo w. Australis)"	Anaxyrus woodhousii	0:21
26.	"Mating Call of the American Toad (Bufo americanus)"	Anaxyrus americanus	0:51
27.	"Mating Call of the Southern Toad (Bufo terrestris)"	Anaxyrus terrestris	0:41
28.	"Mating Call of Eastern Grey Treefrog (Hyla versicolor)"	Dryophytes chrysoscelis	0:30
29.	"Mating Call of Gray Treefrog (Hyla chrysoscelis)"	Dryophytes chrysoscelis	0:37
30.	"Mating Call of the Gray Treefrog (Hyla chrysoscelis)"	Dryophytes chrysoscelis	0:32
31.	"Mating Call of the Gray Treefrog (Hyla chrysoscelis)"	Dryophytes chrysoscelis	0:23
32.	"Mating Call of the Canyon Treefrog (Hyla arenicolor)"	Dryophytes arenicolor	0:31
33.	"Mating Call of the California Treefrog (Hyla cadaverina)"	Pseudacris cadaverina	1:01
34.	"Warning Croak Accompanied by "Warning Vibration" of the Southern Toad (Bufo terrestris)"	Anaxyrus terrestris	0:54
35.	"Warning Chirp of the Boreal Toad (Bufo boreas boreas)"	Anaxyrus boreas boreas	0:31
36.	"Warning Croak of the Sonoran Desert Toad (Bufo alvarius)"	Incilius alvarius	0:28
37.	"Warning Chirp of the California Treefrog (Hyla cadaverina)"	Pseudacris cadaverina	0:31
38.	"Warning Croak of the Florida Gopher Frog (Rana capito)"	Lithobates capito	0:55
39.	"The "Territoriality Call" of the Southern Race of the Green Frog"	Lithobates clamitans clamitans	0:27
40.	"Rain Song of the Squirrel Treefrog (Hyla squirella)"	Dryophytes squirellus	1:01
41.	"Scream of the Southern Leopard Frog (Rana utricularia)"	Lithobates sphenocephalus	0:49
42.	"Chorus of Pig Frogs (Rana grylio)"	Lithobates grylio	0:57
43.	"The Grunt-Like Sound Produced by the Pig Frog (Rana grylio)"	Lithobates grylio	0:17
44.	"The Voice of the Pig Frog (Rana grylio)"	Lithobates grylio	0:39
45.	"The Mating Call of the Bullfrog (Rana catesbeiana)"	Lithobates catesbeianus	0:33
46.	"The Mating Call of the Pig Frog (Rana grylio)"	Lithobates grylio	0:32
47.	"Mating Chorus of Southern Leopard Frogs (Rana utricularia)"	Lithobates sphenocephalus	0:34
48.	"Mating Call of the Pickerel Frog (Rana palustris)"	Lithobates palustris	0:29
49.	"Mating Call of the Giant Toad (Bufo marinus)"	Rhinella marina	0:43
50.	"Mating Call of the Sonoran Desert Toad (Bufo alvarius)"	Incilius alvarius	0:39
51.	"Mating Call of the Gulf Coast Toad (Bufo valliceps)"	Incilius valliceps	0:48
52.	"Mating Call of the Arroyo Toad (Bufo microscaphus californicus)"	Anaxyrus microscaphus	0:41
53.	"Mating Call of the Red-Spotted Toad (Bufo punctatus)"	Anaxyrus punctatus	0:45
54.	"Mating Call of the Green Toad (Bufo debilis insidior)"	Anaxyrus debilis insidior	0:42
55.	"Mating Call of the Oak Toad (Bufo quercicus)"	Anaxyrus quercicus	0:27
56.	"The Call of the Green Toad (Bufo debilis insidior)"	Anaxyrus debilis insidior	0:34
57.	"The Call of the Green Toad (Bufo debilis) at One-Quarter Speed"	Anaxyrus debilis	0:40
58.	"The Mating Chorus of the Eastern Narrow-Mouthed Toad (Gastrophryne carolinensis)"	Gastrophryne carolinensis	0:38
59.	"The Mating Call of the Great Plains Narrow-Mouthed Toad (Gastrophryne olivacea)"	Gastrophryne olivacea	0:33
60.	"Mating Chorus of the Plains Spadefoot (Scaphiopus bombifrons)"	Spea bombifrons	0:41
61.	"Chorus of the Lowland Burrowing Treefrog (Pternohyla fodiens)"	Smilisca fodiens	0:27
62.	"Mating Call of the Pine Barrens Treefrog (Hyla andersoni)"	Dryophytes andersonii	0:35
63.	"Mating Call of Mountain Treefrog (Hyla eximia)"	Dryophytes eximius	0:36
64.	"Mating Call of the Mexican Treefrog (Smilisca baudini)"	Smilisca baudinii	0:35
65.	"Mating Call of the Spring Peeper (Hyla crucifer)"	Pseudacris crucifer	0:23
66.	"Mating Chorus of the Pacific Treefrog (Hyla regilla)"	Pseudacris regilla	0:33
67.	"The Mating Call of the Dwarf Mexican Treefrog (Hyla smithi)"	Tlalocohyla smithii	0:33
68.	"Mating Call of the Little Grass Frog (Pseudacris ocularis)"	Pseudacris ocularis	0:17
69.	"Western Chorus Frog (Psuedocris triseriata)"	Pseudacris triseriata	0:24
70.	"Blanchard's Cricket Frog (Acris gryllus blanchardi)"	Acris gryllus	0:28
71.	"The Florida Cricket Frog (Acris gryllus dorsalis)"	Acris gryllus dorsalis	0:16
72.	"Mexican Leaf Frog (Pachymedusa dacnicolor)"	Agalychnis dacnicolor	0:26
73.	"Mating Call of Couch's Spadefoot (Scaphiopus couchi)"	Scaphiopus couchii	0:35
74.	"Mating Call of the Plains Spadefoot (Scaphiopus bombifrons)"	Spea bombifrons	0:19
75.	"Mating Chorus of the New Mexico Spadefoot (Scaphiopus multiplicatus)"	Spea multiplicata	0:31
76.	"Mating Chorus of Three Species of Spadefoot"	American spadefoot toads	0:36
77.	"Mating Call of the Great Basin Spadefoot (Scaphiopus intermontanus)"	Spea intermontana	0:30
78.	"Mating Call of the Sabinal Frog (Leptodactylus melanonotus)"	Leptodactylus melanonotus	0:31
79.	"Mating Chorus of the Great Plains Toad (Bufo cognatus)"	Anaxyrus cognatus	0:28
80.	"Mating Call of the Yosemite Toad (Bufo canorus)"	Anaxyrus canorus	0:33
81.	"Mating Call of Sonoran Green Toad (Bufo retiformis)"	Anaxyrus retiformis	0:26
82.	"Mating Call of the Green Toad (Bufo debilis insidior)"	Anaxyrus debilis insidior	0:25
83.	"Mating Call of the Carpenter Frog (Rana virgatipes)"	Lithobates virgatipes	1:02
84.	"Winter Mating Chorus of the Pátzcuaro Frog (Rana dunni)"	Lithobates dunni	0:39
85.	"Chorus of Bullfrogs (Rana catesbeina)"	Lithobates catesbeianus	0:31
86.	"Chorus of Sonoran Desert Toads... etc"	Incilius alvarius	0:54
87.	"Chorus of Spadefoot Toads"	American spadefoot toads	0:34
88.	"Frog Chorus"		0:38
89.	"Large Chorus"		0:26
90.	"A Breeding Chorus of the Southern Toad... etc"		0:30
91.	"Sounds Issuing From the Oklawaha River East of Orange Springs"		1:03
92.	"Mixed Chorus"		0:53

== See also ==
- List of amphibians of Northern America
