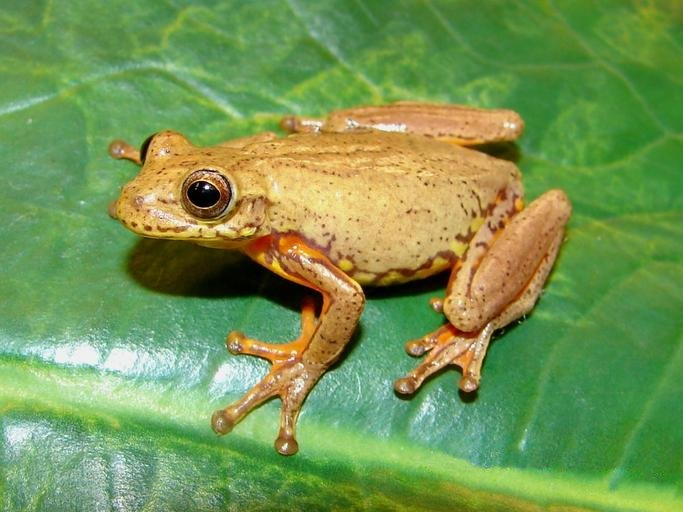

Conservation status
- Least Concern (IUCN 3.1)

Scientific classification
- Kingdom: Animalia
- Phylum: Chordata
- Class: Amphibia
- Order: Anura
- Family: Hylidae
- Genus: Dendropsophus
- Species: D. bogerti

Binomial name
- Dendropsophus bogerti (Cochran & Goin, 1970)

Synonyms
- Hyla bogerti Cochran & Goin, 1970; Hyla charlesbogerti Goin, 1970 (substitute name)

= Dendropsophus bogerti =

Species of frog

Dendropsophus bogerti is a species of frog in the family Hylidae. The species is endemic to the Andes of Colombia and occurs in the Cordillera Central in Antioquia, Caldas, and Chocó Departments. The specific name bogerti honors Charles Mitchill Bogert, an American herpetologist. Soon after its description in 1970, it was relegated to synonymy of Dendropsophus carnifex, but its species status was restored in 1997.

== Description ==
In a sample of Dendropsophus bogerti from Chocó, three adult males measured 25–26 mm (0.98–1.02 in) and an adult female measured 31 mm (1.2 in) in snout-to-vent length (SVL). In a sample of 11 adults (no sex specified), including the holotype, SVL varied between 31 and 34 mm (1.2 and 1.3 in). The snout is short and rounded. The tympanum is very indistinct. The fingers are webbed at the base, whereas the toes are slightly more than one-half webbed. Coloration is sexually dimorphic: males have dull yellowish green dorsal surfaces of body and limbs, while these are pale golden brown or beige in females. The concealed surfaces of the limbs are bright orange. The throat is bright yellow, and the belly and posteroventral part of flanks are pale brownish yellow. The iris is coppery.

The tadpoles have an ovoid body that is wider than it is tall. Body coloration is dark brown with blue, gold, and purple iridescence anteriorly and with golden spots dorsally. The fins are coppery brown. The tail is xiphicercal (i.e., narrowing abruptly to a distinct flagellum). Tadpoles of Gosner stage 34 measure 14–15 mm (0.6–0.6 in) in body length, or about 41% of the total length.

== Habitat and conservation ==
Dendropsophus bogerti is an adaptable species found in open areas such as secondary forest and pastureland at elevations of 1,500–2,580 m (4,920–8,460 ft) above sea level. The eggs are deposited in temporary or permanent pools. This very common species is not facing any known threats. Nevertheless, it has not been recorded in protected areas.
