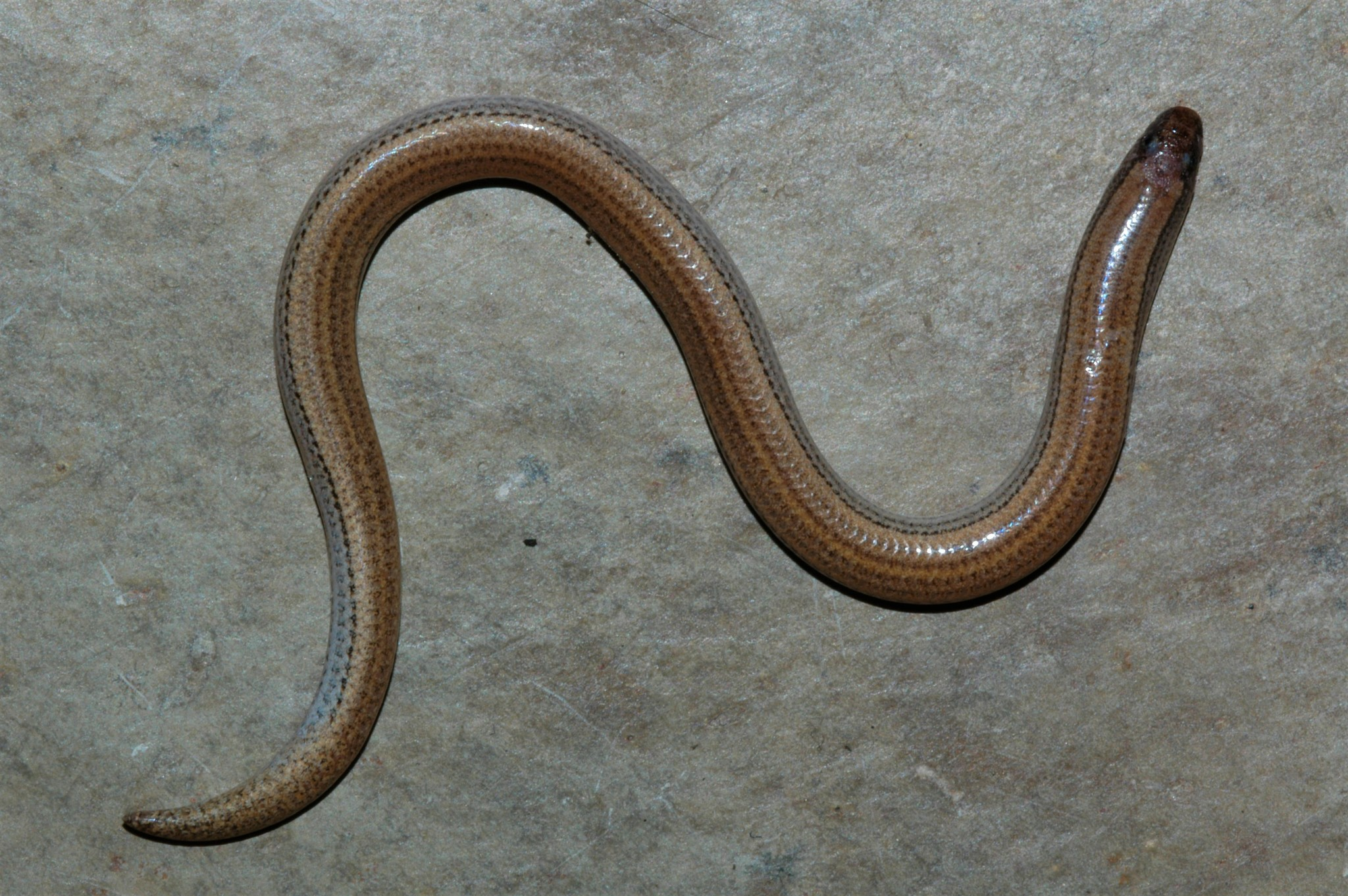

Scientific classification
- Domain: Eukaryota
- Kingdom: Animalia
- Phylum: Chordata
- Class: Reptilia
- Order: Squamata
- Family: Scincidae
- Genus: Typhlacontias
- Species: T. rohani

Binomial name
- Typhlacontias rohani Angel, 1923

= Typhlacontias rohani =

Species of reptile

Typhlacontias rohani, Rohan's blind dart skink, is a species of lizard which is found in Namibia, Botswana, Zimbabwe, Zambia, and Angola.
