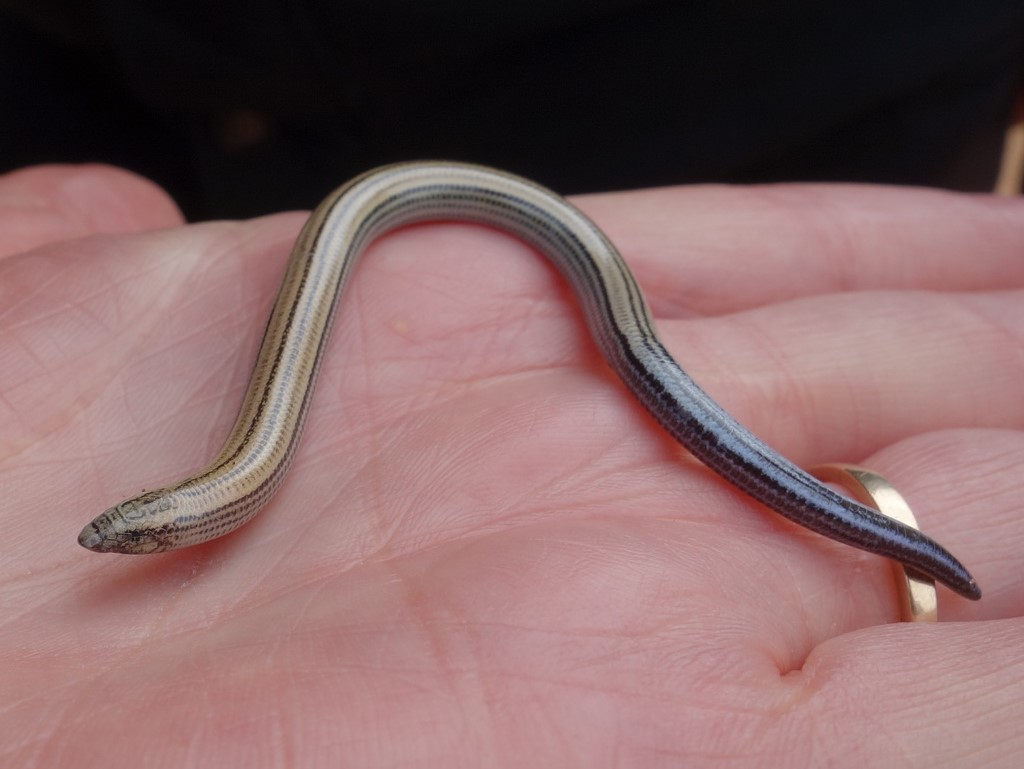

Conservation status
- Least Concern (IUCN 3.1)

Scientific classification
- Kingdom: Animalia
- Phylum: Chordata
- Class: Reptilia
- Order: Squamata
- Suborder: Scinciformata
- Infraorder: Scincomorpha
- Family: Scincidae
- Genus: Typhlacontias
- Species: T. brevipes

Binomial name
- Typhlacontias brevipes FitzSimons, 1938

Synonyms
- Fitzsimonsia brevipes (FitzSimons, 1938)

= Typhlacontias brevipes =

Species of lizard

Typhlacontias brevipes, also known as FitzSimon's [sic] burrowing skink or short blind dart skink, is a species of skink endemic to the Namib Desert (Namibia). It was described by Vivian FitzSimons in 1938.

== Etymology ==
The species name is derived from the Latin words brevis, -e = short and pes, pedis = foot.

== Description ==
These slender skinks have small eyes with no eyelids and no external ear openings. The hindlimb rudiments are visible on either side of cloaca. The body coloration varies from light buff to sulphur yellow. Vague stripes, formed by the scales, can occur along the back and upper flanks. The tail is blue-grey. They can reach a snout–vent length of 113 mm (4.4 in).

Females are viviparous and give birth to up to three young.

== Ecology ==
Typhlacontias brevipes typically occur on the leeward side of dunes in the roots of grass tufts found in semi-stable sand. They are active at night and in the cooler hours of the day when they forage for small insects like ants, termites, antlions, and beetles.
