= Bogert's garter snake =

Scientific classification
- Kingdom: Animalia
- Phylum: Chordata
- Class: Reptilia
- Order: Squamata
- Suborder: Serpentes
- Family: Colubridae
- Genus: Thamnophis
- Species: T. bogerti

Binomial name
- Thamnophis bogerti Rossman & Burbrink, 2005

Species of snake

Bogert's garter snake (Thamnophis bogerti) is a species of snake in the family Colubridae. The species is endemic to Mexico.

== Etymology ==
Both the specific name bogerti and the common name Bogert's garter snake are in honor of the American herpetologist Charles Mitchill Bogert.

== Geographic range ==
T. bogerti is found in the Mexican state of Oaxaca.

== Habitat ==
The preferred habitat of T. bogerti is montane forest or woodland at elevations of 2,195–2,743 m (7,201–8,999 ft).

== Reproduction ==
T. bogerti is viviparous.
