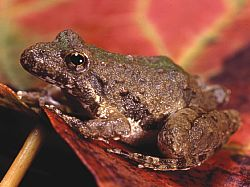

Conservation status
- Secure (NatureServe)

Scientific classification
- Kingdom: Animalia
- Phylum: Chordata
- Class: Amphibia
- Order: Anura
- Family: Hylidae
- Genus: Acris
- Species: A. blanchardi

Binomial name
- Acris blanchardi Harper, 1947

Synonyms
- Acris crepitans blanchardi Harper, 1947; Acris crepitans paludicola Burger, Smith & Smith, 1949; Acris gryllus blanchardi Harper, 1947; Hyla ocularis blanchardi (Harper, 1947); Acris gryllus paludicola Burger, Smith & Smith, 1949

Audio

= Blanchard's cricket frog =

Species of amphibian

Blanchard's cricket frog (Acris blanchardi) is a species of frog in the family Hylidae. It is a small, dark colored frog that is threatened or endangered in Michigan, Wisconsin, and Minnesota. Studies have been done to see why the population of the frog is beginning to decrease in those states. Blanchard's cricket frogs are commonly found in wetlands, ponds, and/or near row crop agriculture. The average life span for this frog is about one year, which is why the species is considered to be short-lived. Little is known about the interactions and basic ecology, even though populations are decreasing. Blanchard's cricket frog was formerly considered to be a subspecies of the northern cricket frog.

== Description ==
Blanchard's cricket frogs are a type of aquatic tree frog in North America. They have warty skin that is usually brown, gray, tan, or olive green, with darker bands of color on the legs. Their skin is also heavily vascularized, which allows substances to get into their bodies quickly, increasing their susceptibility to diseases. Due to this, handling with bare hands is unadvised. A dark, triangular mark between the eyes is frequently seen, and can be used to easily identify the species. Many different colors can be seen on certain specimen's backs, usually being either a dark red, orange, light green, or in rarer cases, a combination. They are small frogs, growing to 0.6 inches (1.5 cm) in length on average.

Blanchard's cricket frogs hibernate during the cold months, beginning in late October, and emerging from hibernation in late March or early April. Breeding occurs from mid-May to mid-July. Females lay small clusters or single eggs. Tadpoles emerge in late summer. Breeding males have a metallic clicking call distinctive to the species. The subspecies is named after Frank N. Blanchard, a noted American herpetologist. The frogs are most commonly found in slow-moving or stagnant bodies of water, such as in streams and wetlands, where reproduction takes place. Only a few survive until the second breeding season. If a breeding season isn't productive, the population for that area can decline.

== Range ==
Blanchard's cricket frogs are found from northeastern Mexico to South Dakota, east to Ohio and West Virginia. The southeastern limits of their range are generally along the Ohio River and the Mississippi River. A. blanchardi has been recorded in parts of western Mississippi.

== Predation ==
Blanchard's cricket frogs are prey for American bullfrogs, northern watersnakes, and probably raccoons.

== Conservation ==
Blanchard's cricket frogs can be found through most of the Midwest United States, ranging from Michigan and Wisconsin in the north to southern Texas in the south and from Colorado in the west to West Virginia in the east. Although not listed at the federal level, Blanchard's cricket frogs are considered at risk in some states. It is an endangered species in Wisconsin, and is a threatened species in Michigan, due to a significant population decline since the late 1970s. Habitat loss, chemical contaminants, and competition for resources have been posited as reasons for this decline. Populations can still be found in the southern and western portions of Michigan's Lower Peninsula.

In Minnesota, where the state's Department of Natural Resources includes A. blanchardi as a subspecies of A. crepitans, both taxa are collectively considered endangered. A. blanchardi may also still be on Pelee Island, Ontario, Canada, but has not been reported since 1987. It was thought that competition by Bullfrogs caused a decrease in the population of Blanchard's cricket frog, however, a study found no evidence that Bullfrog tadpoles took enough resources from Blanchard's cricket frog tadpoles to impact them. Another study of the immune defense traits of Blanchard's cricket frog showed that multiple factors can influence the immune system of the frog, for example water conductivity, water surface area, and ratio of natural to managed land. All of these factors were found to influence the skin microbiome of the frog, and compromise the frog's immune system. While some decreases in population are due to chemical contaminants and competition for resources, the major reason for the decrease is still unknown.

== Gallery ==
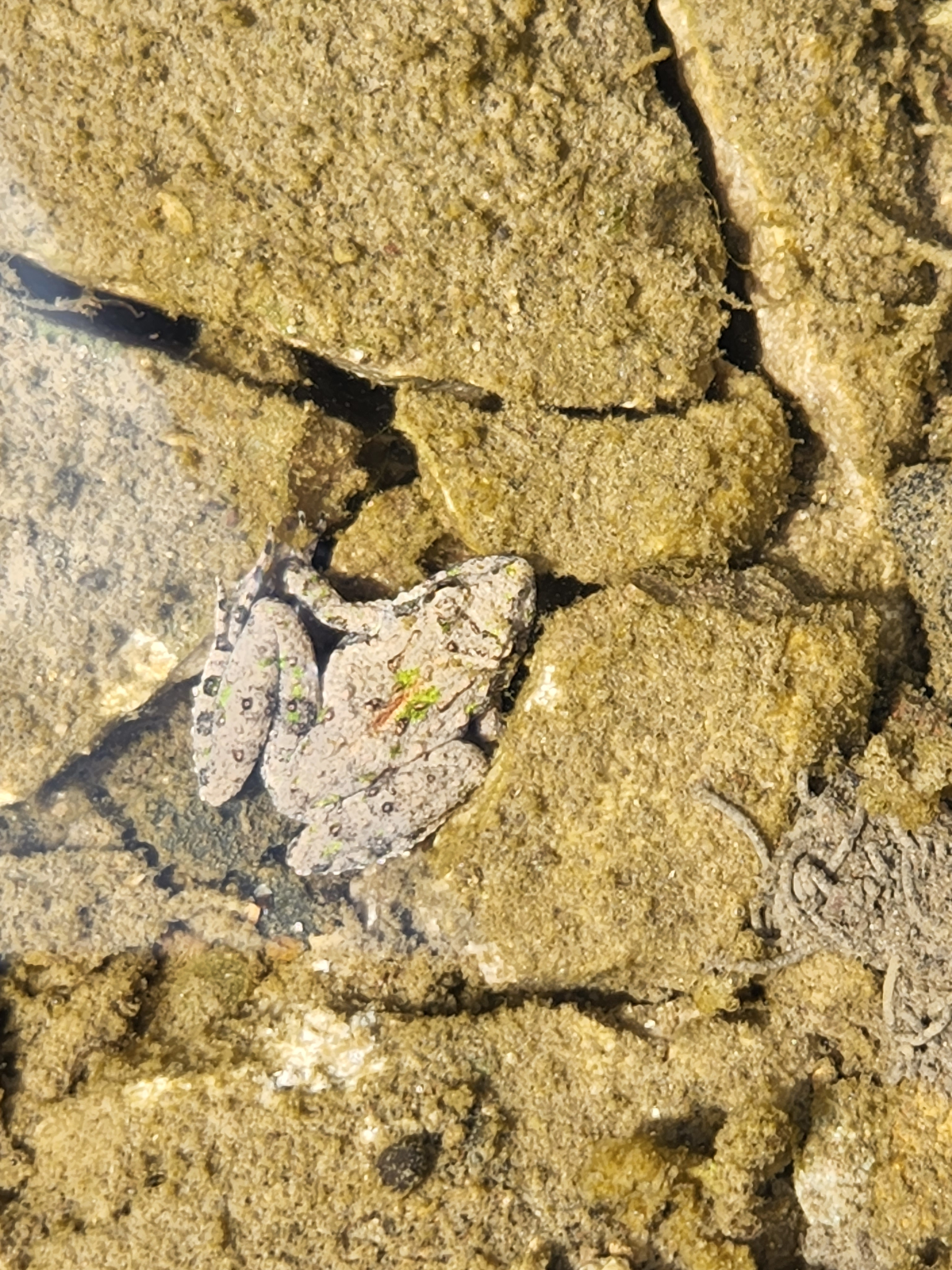
A Blanchard's cricket frog with a red-orange-green back stripe

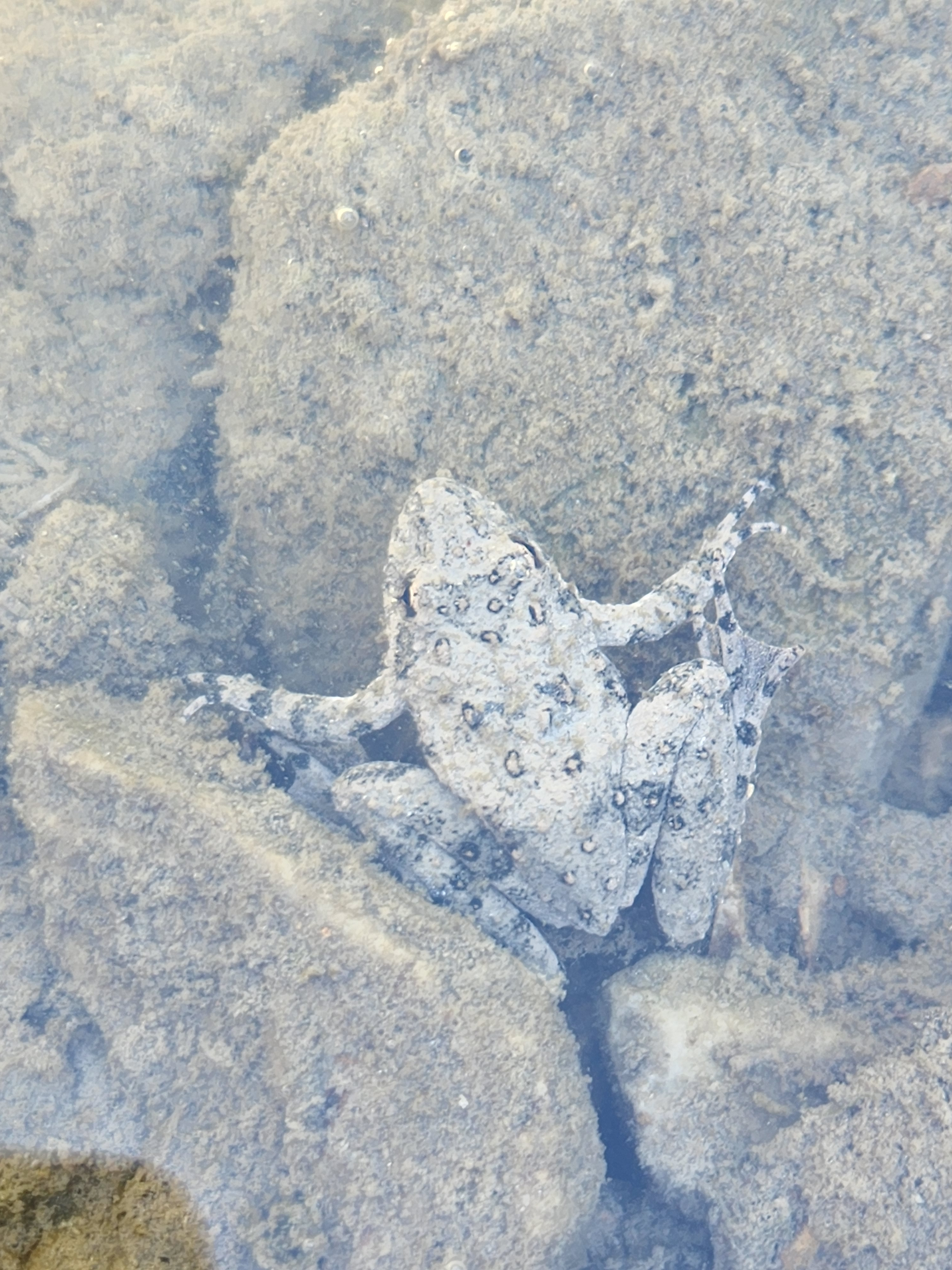
A Blanchard's cricket frog with light patterns

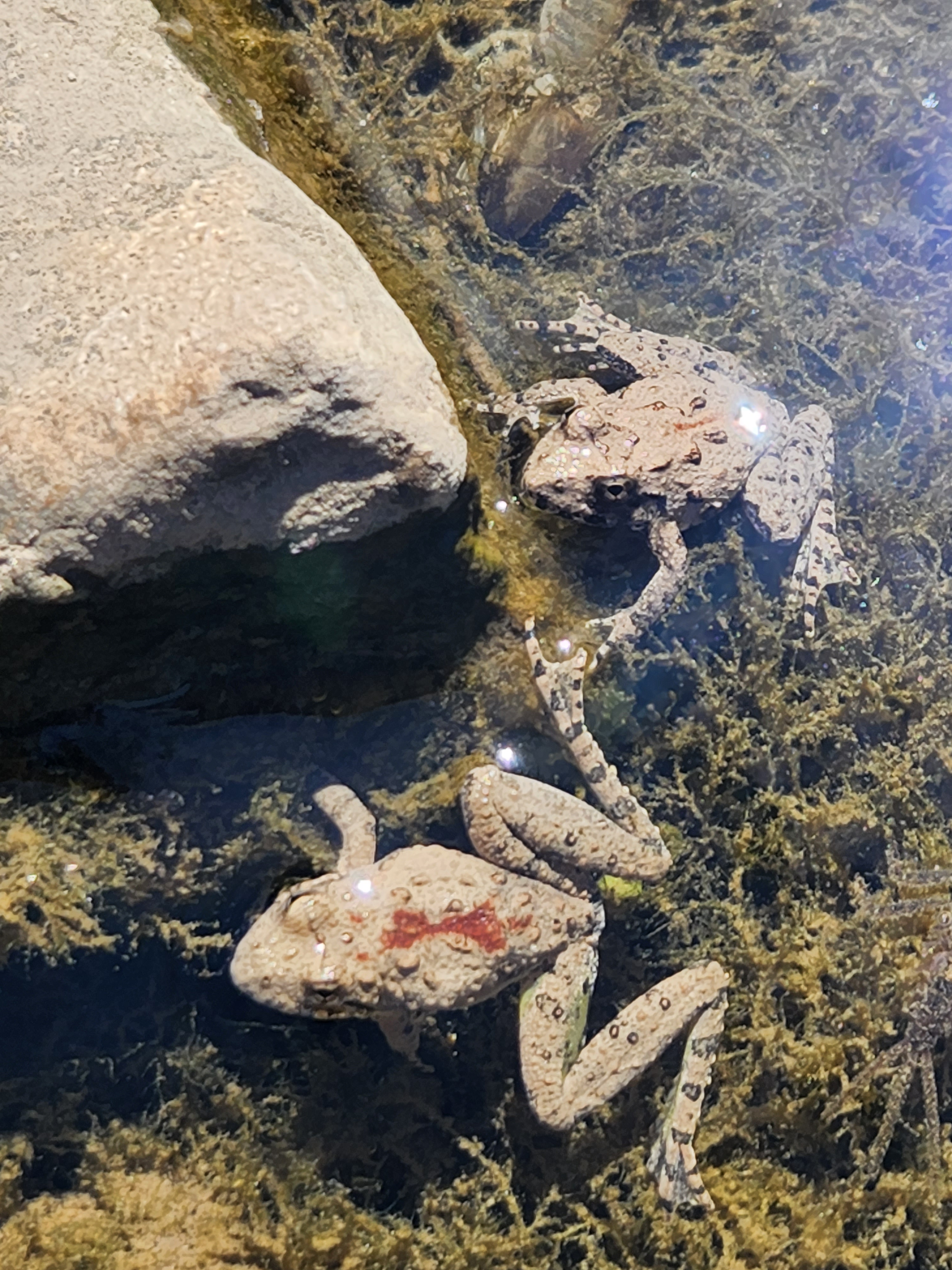
Two Blanchard's cricket frogs, both with prominent red stripes

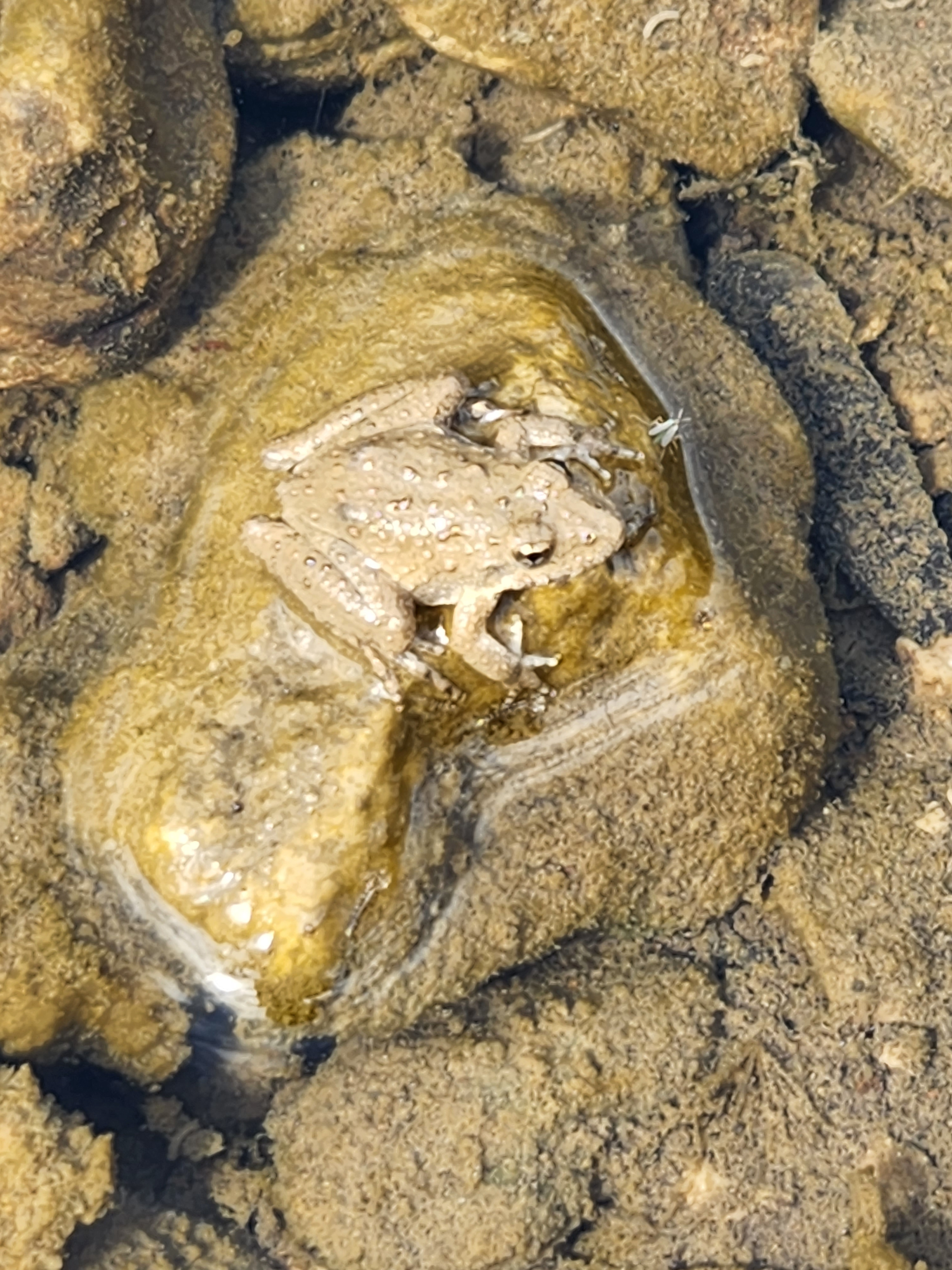
A patternless Blanchard's cricket frog

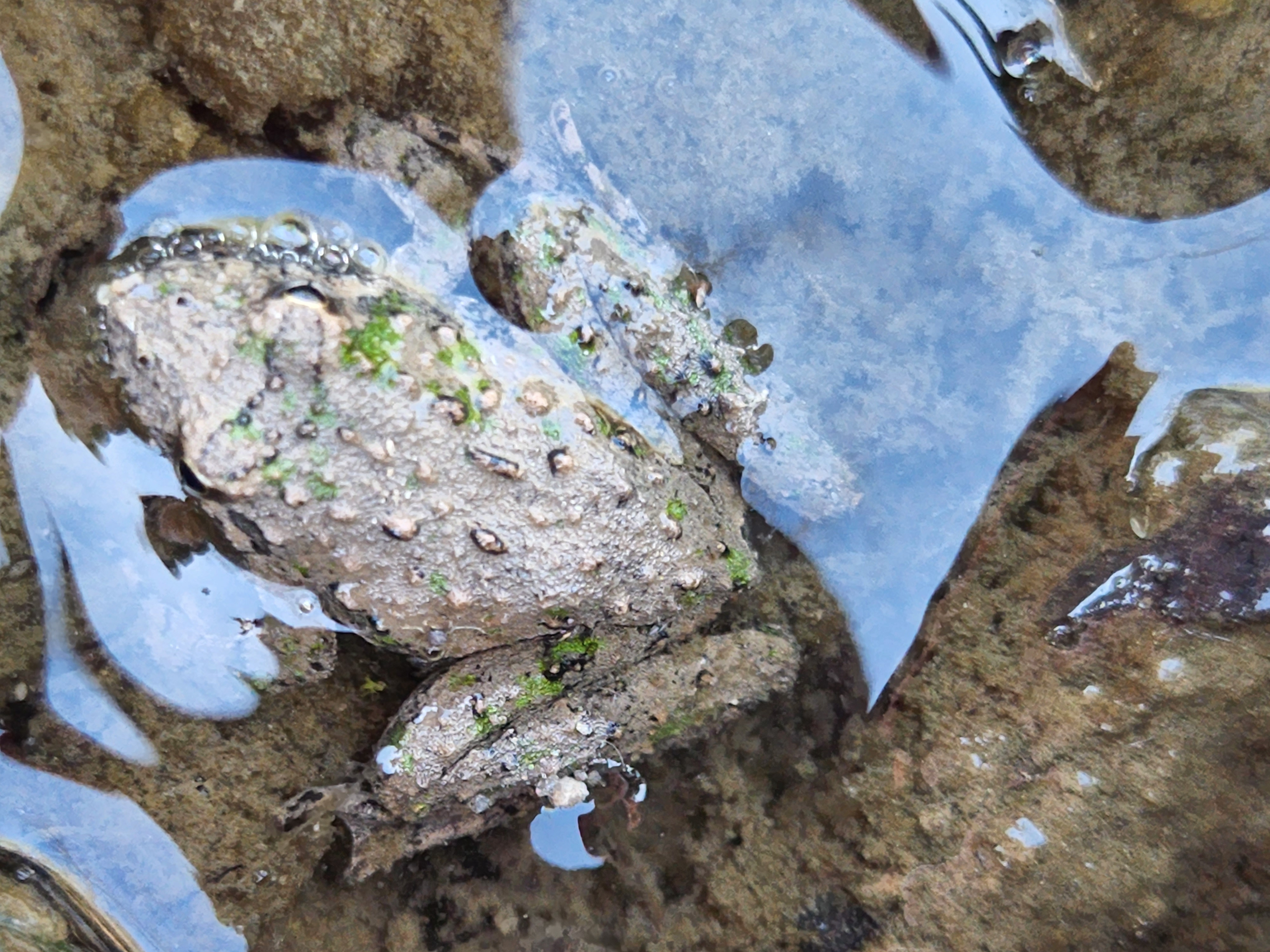
A Blanchard's cricket frog with abnormal green patterns/moss

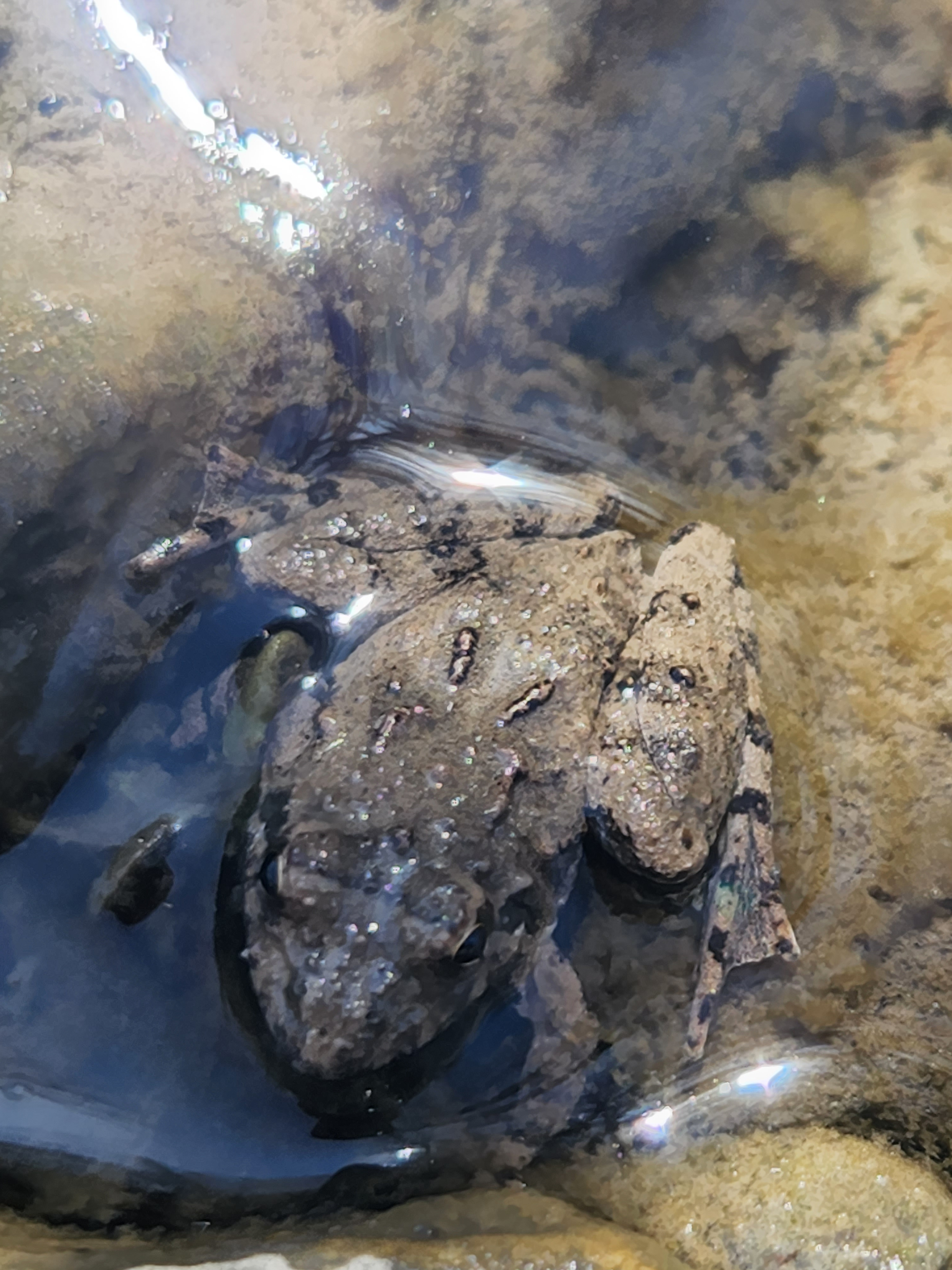
A Blanchard's cricket frog

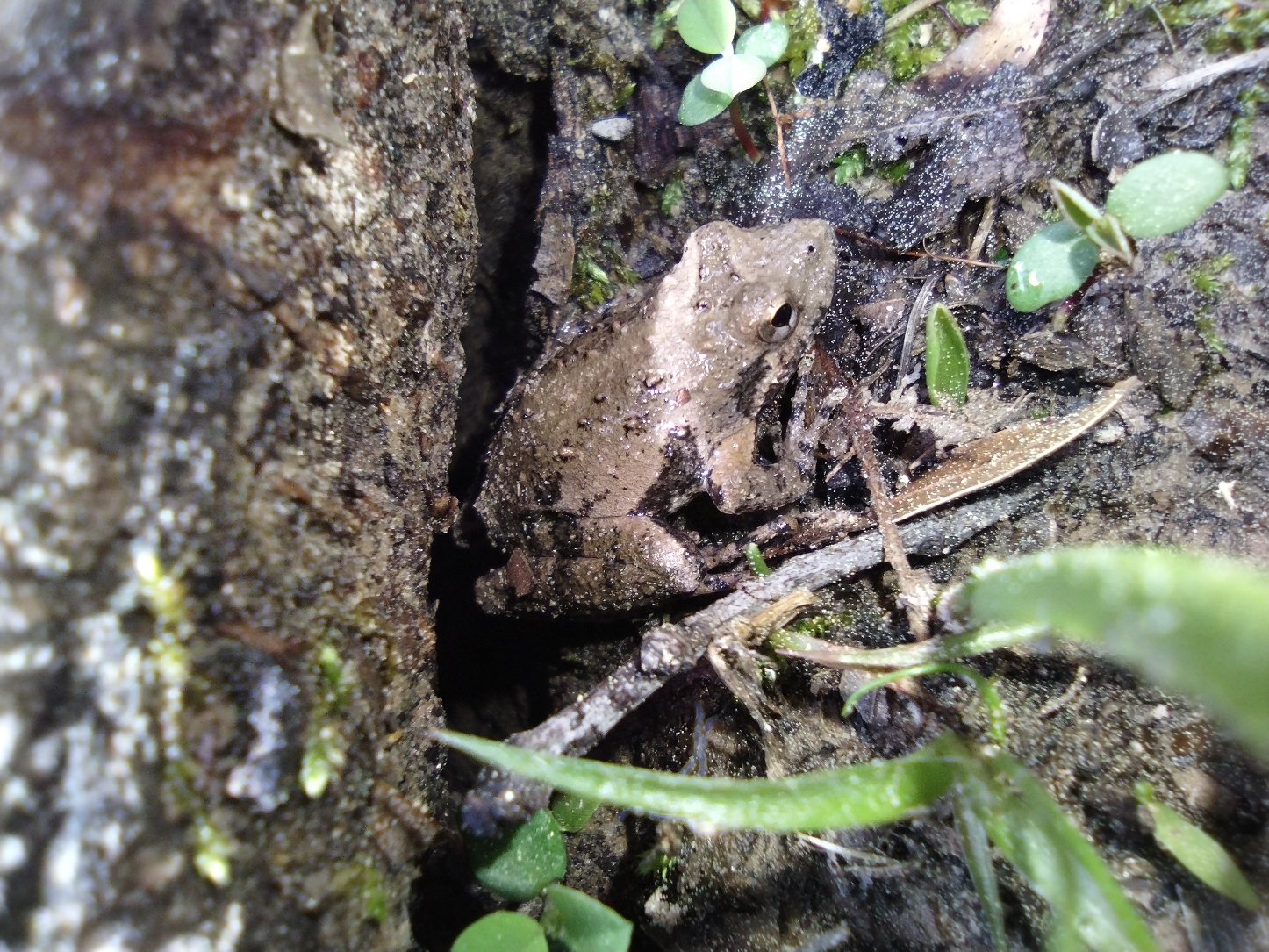
Blanchard's cricket frog in Northwest Louisiana, United States.
