= Bogert's coral snake =

Conservation status
- Data Deficient (IUCN 3.1)

Scientific classification
- Kingdom: Animalia
- Phylum: Chordata
- Class: Reptilia
- Order: Squamata
- Suborder: Serpentes
- Family: Elapidae
- Genus: Micrurus
- Species: M. bogerti

Binomial name
- Micrurus bogerti Roze, 1967
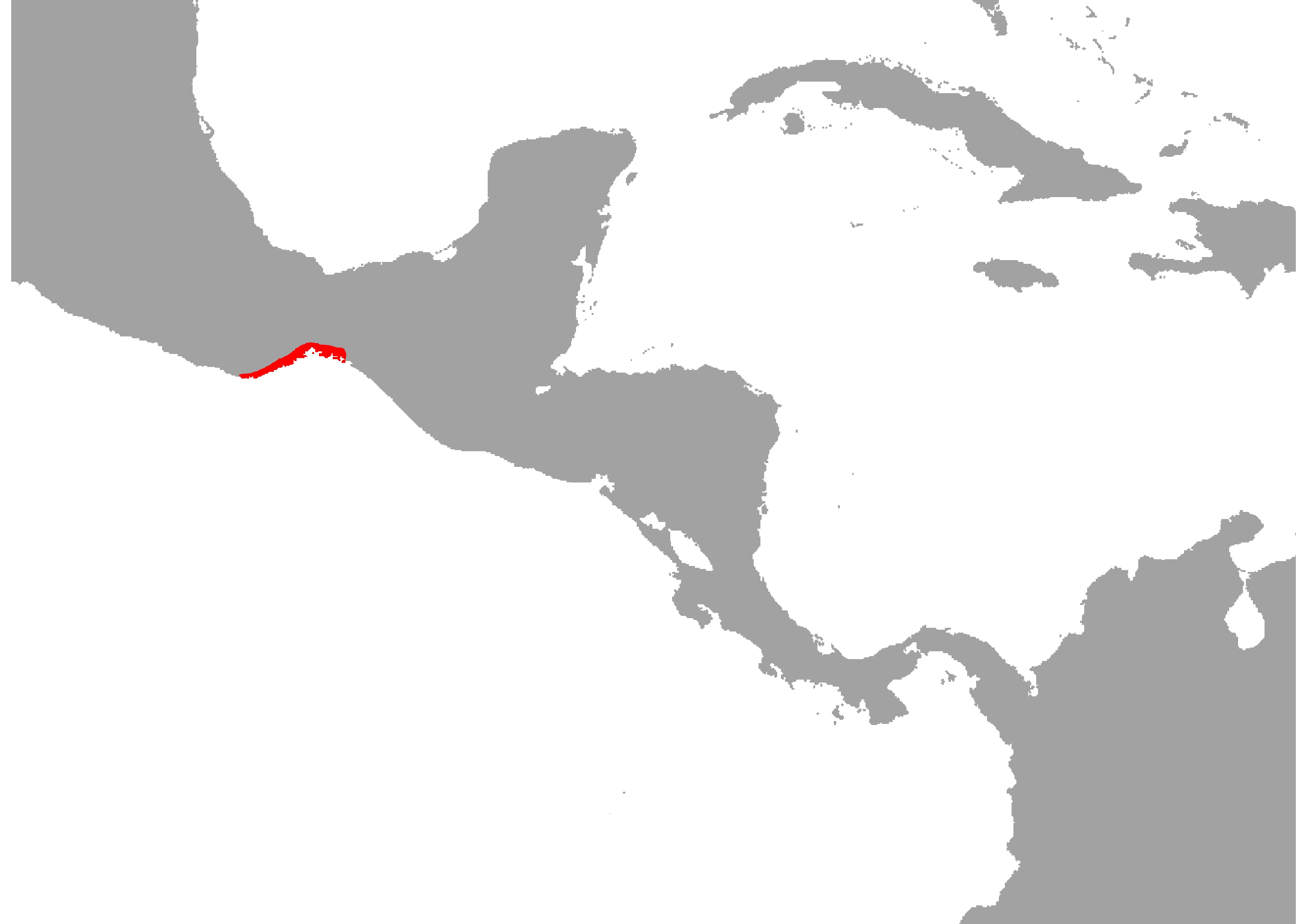

Species of snake

Bogert's coral snake (Micrurus bogerti), also known commonly as the coastal coral snake and el coralillo costanero in Mexican Spanish, is a species of venomous snake in the family Elapidae. The species is native to southern Mexico.

== Etymology ==
The specific name, bogerti, is in honor of American herpetologist Charles Mitchill Bogert.

== Geographic range ==
Micrurus bogerti is endemic to the Mexican state of Oaxaca, where it is found on the Pacific coast, ranging from Puerto Ángel to San Pedro Tapanatepec.

== Habitat ==
Known only from a few specimens from four localities, Micrurus bogerti is found in tropical deciduous forest, dry coastal forest, and scrub forest, at elevations from sea level to 400 m (1,300 ft).

== Description ==
Micrurus bogerti has a black snout, followed by a yellow parietal band, followed by a black nuchal band. The body is red with 16–19 black rings. The black rings, which are narrower than the red spaces between them, are edged with yellow or white rings which are even narrower. The red spaces are 6–8 dorsal scales wide; the black rings, 3–4 dorsals; and the yellow or white rings, 1–2 dorsals.

M. bogerti is medium-sized for its genus. Adults usually have a total length (tail included) of 38–60 cm (15–24 in), and the maximum recorded total length is 77 cm (30 in). Males do not have supra-anal tubercles.

== Reproduction ==
Micrurus bogerti is oviparous.

== Conservation status ==
No conservation measures are known, but Micrurus bogerti is protected by Mexican law.

== Taxonomy ==
There are no recognized subspecies of Micrurus bogerti.
