= Typhlacontias punctatissimus =

Conservation status
- Least Concern (IUCN 3.1)

Scientific classification
- Kingdom: Animalia
- Phylum: Chordata
- Class: Reptilia
- Order: Squamata
- Family: Scincidae
- Genus: Typhlacontias
- Species: T. punctatissimus

Binomial name
- Typhlacontias punctatissimus Bocage, 1873

Species of reptile

Typhlacontias punctatissimus, also known commonly as the dotted blind dart skink, the speckled burrowing skink, and the speckled western burrowing skink, is a species of lizard in the family Scincidae. The species is native to southern Africa. Three subspecies are recognized.

== Geographic range ==
T. punctatissimus found in Angola and Namibia.

== Habitat ==
The preferred natural habitat of T. punctatissimus is desert at altitudes from sea level to 300 m (980 ft).

== Description ==
A small burrowing skink, T. punctatissimus usually has a snout-to-vent length (SVL) of 6–8 cm (2.4–3.1 in). Maximum recorded SVL is 8.6 cm (3.4 in). It has no eyelids, no external ear openings, and usually no legs. However, some specimens may have rudimentary hind limbs. Dorsally, it is golden brown, with many black dots forming lines. The ventral surface of the tail is silvery blue.

== Behavior ==
T. punctatissimus is terrestrial and fossorial.

== Reproduction ==
T. punctatissimus is viviparous.

== Subspecies ==
Three subspecies are recognized as being valid, including the nominotypical subspecies.

- Typhlacontias punctatissimus bogerti Laurent, 1964
- Typhlacontias punctatissimus brainei Haacke, 1997
- Typhlacontias punctatissimus punctatissimus Bocage, 1873

== Etymology ==
The subspecific name, bogerti, is in honor of American herpetologist Charles Mitchill Bogert.

The subspecific name, brainei, is in honor of Steve Braine, who was a ranger at Skeleton Coast National Park, Namibia.
