= Typhlacontias kataviensis =

Conservation status
- Endangered (IUCN 3.1)

Scientific classification
- Kingdom: Animalia
- Phylum: Chordata
- Class: Reptilia
- Order: Squamata
- Suborder: Scinciformata
- Infraorder: Scincomorpha
- Family: Scincidae
- Genus: Typhlacontias
- Species: T. kataviensis

Binomial name
- Typhlacontias kataviensis Broadley, 2006

Species of reptile

Typhlacontias kataviensis, the Katavi blind dart skink, is a species of lizard which is endemic to Tanzania.
