= Emoia bogerti =

Conservation status
- Least Concern (IUCN 3.1)

Scientific classification
- Kingdom: Animalia
- Phylum: Chordata
- Class: Reptilia
- Order: Squamata
- Family: Scincidae
- Genus: Emoia
- Species: E. bogerti

Binomial name
- Emoia bogerti W.C. Brown, 1953

Synonyms
- Emoia submetallica bogerti W.C. Brown, 1953; Emoia bogerti — W.C. Brown, 1991

Species of lizard

Emoia bogerti, Bogert's emo skink, is a species of lizard in the family Scincidae. The species is native to Indonesia.

== Etymology ==
The specific name, bogerti, is in honor of American herpetologist Charles Mitchill Bogert. (1908-1992), former curator of the Department of Herpetology of the American Museum of Natural History.

== Geographic range ==
E. bogerti is endemic to Western New Guinea (also known as Papua), Indonesia.

== Habitat ==
The preferred natural habitats of E. bogerti are forest and shrubland, at altitudes of 200–2,000 m (660–6,560 ft).

== Description ==
E. bogerti may attain a snout-to-vent length (SVL) of almost 6 cm (2.4 in). Dorsally, it is light brown, with darker brown lines. Ventrally, it is gray.

== Reproduction ==
E. bogerti is oviparous. Clutch size is two eggs.
