= Abronia bogerti =

Conservation status
- Data Deficient (IUCN 3.1)
- CITES Appendix II

Scientific classification
- Kingdom: Animalia
- Phylum: Chordata
- Class: Reptilia
- Order: Squamata
- Suborder: Anguimorpha
- Family: Anguidae
- Genus: Abronia
- Species: A. bogerti

Binomial name
- Abronia bogerti Tihen, 1954
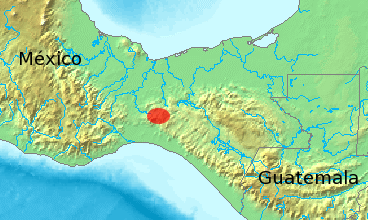
- Geographic range of Abronia bogerti

Synonyms
- Abronia bogerti Tihen, 1954; Abronia (Scopaeabronia) bogerti — Campbell & Frost, 1993; Abronia bogerti — Liner, 1994

Species of lizard

Abronia bogerti, known by the common names Bogert's arboreal alligator lizard and escorpión arborícola de Bogert in Mexican Spanish, is a species of lizard in the family Anguidae. The species is endemic to Mexico.

== Etymology ==
The specific name, bogerti, is in honor of American herpetologist Charles Mitchill Bogert.

== Geographic range ==
Abronia bogerti is indigenous to eastern Oaxaca, Mexico. A single specimen, the holotype, of A. bogerti was collected in 1954, and it was not seen again until 2000, at which time a second specimen was photographed. The type locality is "north of Niltepec, between Cerro Atravesado and Sierra Madre, Oaxaca".

== Behavior ==
Abronia bogerti is largely arboreal.

== Reproduction ==
Abronia bogerti is viviparous.

== Conservation status ==
Because the species Abronia bogerti was collected in the canopy of the forest, it is believed that deforestation and ongoing crop and livestock farming pose the largest threats to its survival. Mexican law protects the lizard.
