= Typhlacontias rudebecki =

Conservation status
- Least Concern (IUCN 3.1)

Scientific classification
- Kingdom: Animalia
- Phylum: Chordata
- Class: Reptilia
- Order: Squamata
- Suborder: Scinciformata
- Infraorder: Scincomorpha
- Family: Scincidae
- Genus: Typhlacontias
- Species: T. rudebecki

Binomial name
- Typhlacontias rudebecki Haacke, 1997

Species of reptile

Typhlacontias rudebecki, Rudebeck's western burrowing skink, is a species of lizard which is endemic to Angola.
