= Charles Mitchill Bogert =

American herpetologist (1908–1992)

Charles M. Bogert
- Bogert in 1955
- Born: June 4, 1908; Mesa, Colorado, U.S.
- Died: April 10, 1992 (aged 83); Santa Fe, New Mexico, U.S.
- Education: University of California, Los Angeles
- Scientific career
- Fields: Herpetology
- Workplaces: American Museum of Natural History

Charles Mitchill Bogert (June 4, 1908 – April 10, 1992) was an American herpetologist, and curator of herpetology and researcher for the American Museum of Natural History.

== Early life and education ==
Born in Mesa, Colorado, Bogert was a technician at the Division of Nature Study for the Los Angeles City Schools in California, a guide at Rocky Mountain National Park, and a forest ranger for the US National Park Service at the Grand Canyon National Park before attaining his bachelor and master of arts degrees at the University of California, Los Angeles.

== Assistant curator ==
From 1936 to 1940, Bogert was the assistant curator of herpetology for the American Museum of Natural History. In the late 1930s and early 1940s, with a grant from the Carnegie Corporation, he participated in several surveys of various states in Mexico, including one with Karl Patterson Schmidt for the Field Museum of Natural History. In 1941, he was elected vice president of the American Society of Ichthyologists and Herpetologists.

== Research work ==
In 1944 Bogert undertook a study on the body temperature of lizards and alligators in Florida, and became chairman and curator for the department of herpetology at the American Museum of Natural History. In 1946 he was appointed the first president of the Herpetologists' League, which publishes the scientific journal Herpetologica, by the league's founder Chapman Grant. From 1948 until 1950 he travelled to Central America to conduct research in Honduras, Nicaragua, Costa Rica and Bimini Island off the Bahamas.

In 1949, he published Thermoregulation in Reptiles, a Factor in Evolution in Evolution. In 1950, he became an instructor at the University of Virginia, and undertook numerous trips to the southwestern United States to do research. In 1952, he was elected president of the American Society of Ichthyologists and Herpetologists, which he served as until 1954. In 1953, he undertook an extensive study of frog vocalizations in the Chiricahua Mountains of Arizona, and released a series of records entitled Sounds of the American Southwest and Sounds of North American Frogs, as well as a recording of Mexican folk music.

== Academic life ==
In 1955, Bogert was awarded a Guggenheim Fellowship for a year's research. In 1960, he became a lecturer at the University of Colorado, and began an extensive study of the Oaxaca region of Mexico. In 1966, he was given an honorary LLD from UCLA. In 1978, he became a consultant at the Los Alamos National Environmental Research Park for a year. Afterwards he continued to travel extensively and conducted further research throughout most of the United States, Mexico, Central America, and Sri Lanka. He had a stroke in 1988, and in 1992, he died in his home in Santa Fe, New Mexico.

== Taxa named in honor of Bogert ==
Bogert is honored by having several reptile taxa named after him, including:

- Bogertophis, a genus of rat snakes
- Abronia bogerti
- Afroedura bogerti
- Callisaurus draconoides bogerti
- Coleonyx variegatus bogerti, western banded gecko
- Emoia bogerti
- Heloderma charlesbogerti, a venomous lizard
- Micrurus bogerti, a venomous snake
- Paraderma bogerti, an extinct helodermatid
- Rhadinaea bogertorum, genitive plural, honoring Bogert and his wife, Martha
- Thamnophis bogerti
- Tropidurus bogerti
- Typhlacontias punctatissimus bogerti
- Varanus bogerti

Also Dendropsophus bogerti, a treefrog, is named after him.
