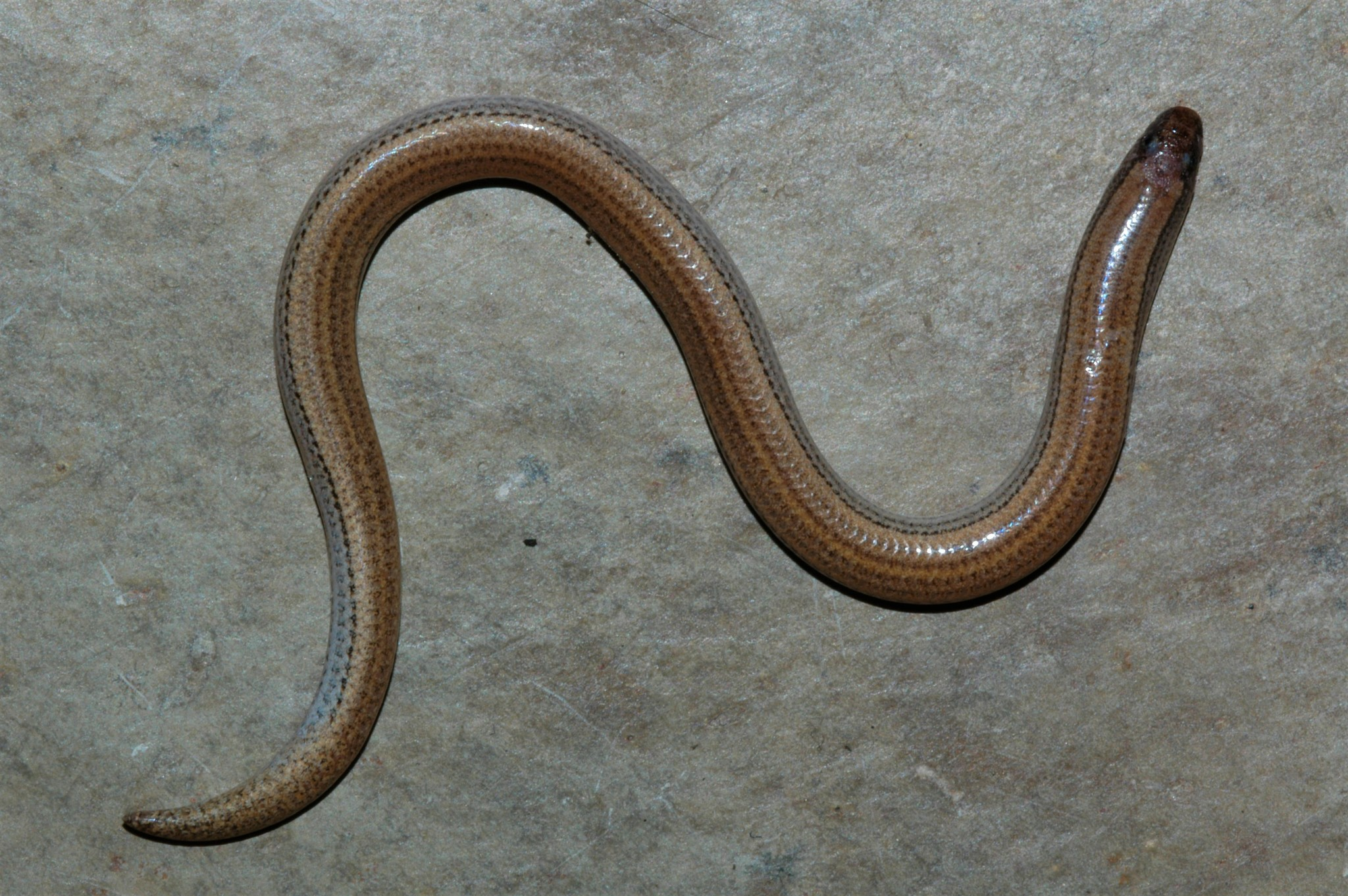
- Typhlacontias rohani

Scientific classification
- Kingdom: Animalia
- Phylum: Chordata
- Class: Reptilia
- Order: Squamata
- Family: Scincidae
- Subfamily: Scincinae
- Genus: Typhlacontias; Bocage, 1873

Type species
- Typhlacontias punctatissimus Bocage, 1873

= Typhlacontias =

Genus of lizards

Typhlacontias is a genus of legless, burrowing skinks in the family Scincidae, a genus endemic to Sub-Saharan Africa. Its sister group is the clade consisting of the genera Feylinia and Melanoseps.

== Species ==
Seven species are recognized as being valid:

- Typhlacontias brevipes V. FitzSimons, 1938 – FitzSimon's burrowing skink, short blind dart skink
- Typhlacontias gracilis Roux, 1907 – Roux's blind dart skink
- Typhlacontias johnsonii Andersson, 1916 – Johnson's western burrowing skink
- Typhlacontias kataviensis Broadley, 2006 – Katavi blind dart skink
- Typhlacontias punctatissimus Bocage, 1873 – dotted blind dart skink, speckled western burrowing skink
- Typhlacontias rohani Angel, 1923 – Rohan's blind dart skink
- Typhlacontias rudebecki Haacke, 1997 – Rudebeck's western burrowing skink
