= Typhlacontias gracilis =

Scientific classification
- Domain: Eukaryota
- Kingdom: Animalia
- Phylum: Chordata
- Class: Reptilia
- Order: Squamata
- Family: Scincidae
- Genus: Typhlacontias
- Species: T. gracilis

Binomial name
- Typhlacontias gracilis Roux, 1907

Species of reptile

Typhlacontias gracilis, Roux's blind dart skink, is a species of lizard which is found in Namibia, Zimbabwe, Botswana, and Zambia.
