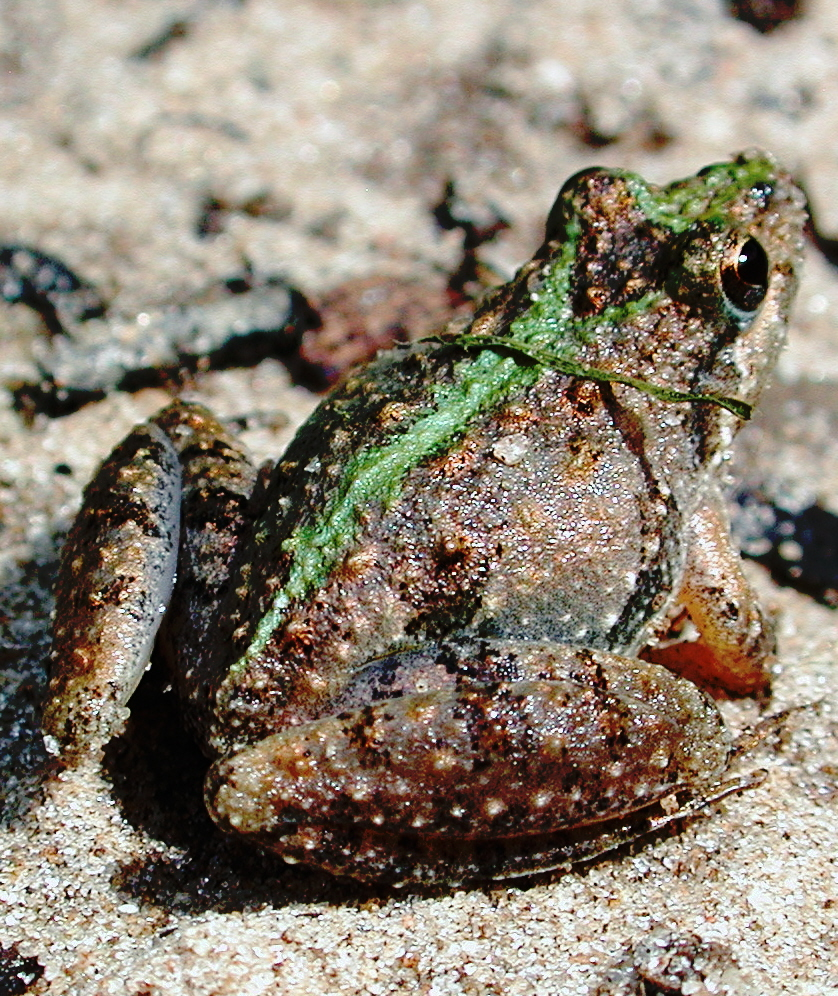
- Acris gryllus

Scientific classification
- Kingdom: Animalia
- Phylum: Chordata
- Class: Amphibia
- Order: Anura
- Family: Hylidae
- Subfamily: Acrisinae
- Genus: Acris; Duméril & Bibron, 1841

Species
- Acris blanchardi; Acris crepitans; Acris gryllus

= Cricket frog =

Cricket frogs Temporal range: Early Miocene to present

Genus of North American amphibians

Cricket frogs, genus Acris, are small, North American frogs of the family Hylidae. They occur in northern Mexico (Coahuila), the United States east of the Rocky Mountains, and in southern Ontario, Canada.

They are more aquatic than other members of the family, and are generally associated with permanent bodies of water with surface vegetation. This is a quite important aspect of their survival, as adult cricket frogs suffer high mortality rates when submerged in poorly oxygenated water (typically less than 24 hours on average in water that is ~1.2 mg/L). The common and scientific names refer to their call, which resembles that of a cricket. The two common species are A. crepitans and A. gryllus. A. crepitans are found in mesic woodlands as well as xeric grasslands, whereas A. gryllus are concentrated in mesic woodlands.

Cricket frogs are able to communicate and attract each other using a specific frequency of their mating call, that sounds like a cricket. It can only be heard by members of the same population. Cricket frogs from other locales are unable to aurally process other calls, leading to mating isolation among the species.

== Species ==
There are three species:

- Acris blanchardi Harper, 1947 – Blanchard's cricket frog
- Acris crepitans Baird, 1854 – northern cricket frog
- Acris gryllus (LeConte, 1825) – southern cricket frog

The earliest known fossil member of the group is †Acris barbouri Holman, 1967 from the Early Miocene of Florida, US.
