= Typhlacontias johnsonii =

Conservation status
- Least Concern (IUCN 3.1)

Scientific classification
- Kingdom: Animalia
- Phylum: Chordata
- Class: Reptilia
- Order: Squamata
- Suborder: Scinciformata
- Infraorder: Scincomorpha
- Family: Scincidae
- Genus: Typhlacontias
- Species: T. johnsonii

Binomial name
- Typhlacontias johnsonii Andersson, 1916

Species of reptile

Typhlacontias johnsonii, Johnson's western burrowing skink, is a species of lizard which is found in Namibia and Angola.
