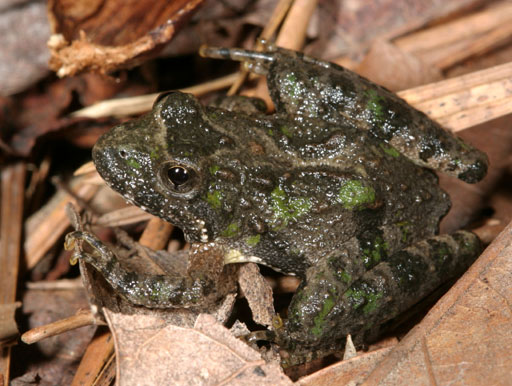

Conservation status
- Least Concern (IUCN 3.1)

Scientific classification
- Kingdom: Animalia
- Phylum: Chordata
- Class: Amphibia
- Order: Anura
- Family: Hylidae
- Genus: Acris
- Species: A. crepitans

Binomial name
- Acris crepitans Baird, 1854

Subspecies
- Acris crepitans crepitans Acris crepitans paludicola

= Northern cricket frog =

Species of amphibian

The northern cricket frog (Acris crepitans) is a species of small hylid frog native to the United States and northeastern Mexico. These frogs are majorly in grey, green, and brown color with blotching patterns. Many have a brown or orange stripe down the center of their back and a triangular marking on the top of their head. Despite being members of the tree frog family, they are not arboreal. These frogs prefer habitats near the edges of slow-moving bodies of water, and in close proximity to shelter items, like rocks. It has two recognized subspecies, A. c. crepitans and A. c. paludicola.

== Description ==
The northern cricket frog is one of the three smallest vertebrates in North America, ranging from 19–38 mm (0.75–1.50 in) long. They have a prominent blunt snout. Its dorsal coloration varies widely, and includes greys, greens, and browns, often in irregular blotching patterns. There is usually a distinct triangular mark on their head between their eyes.

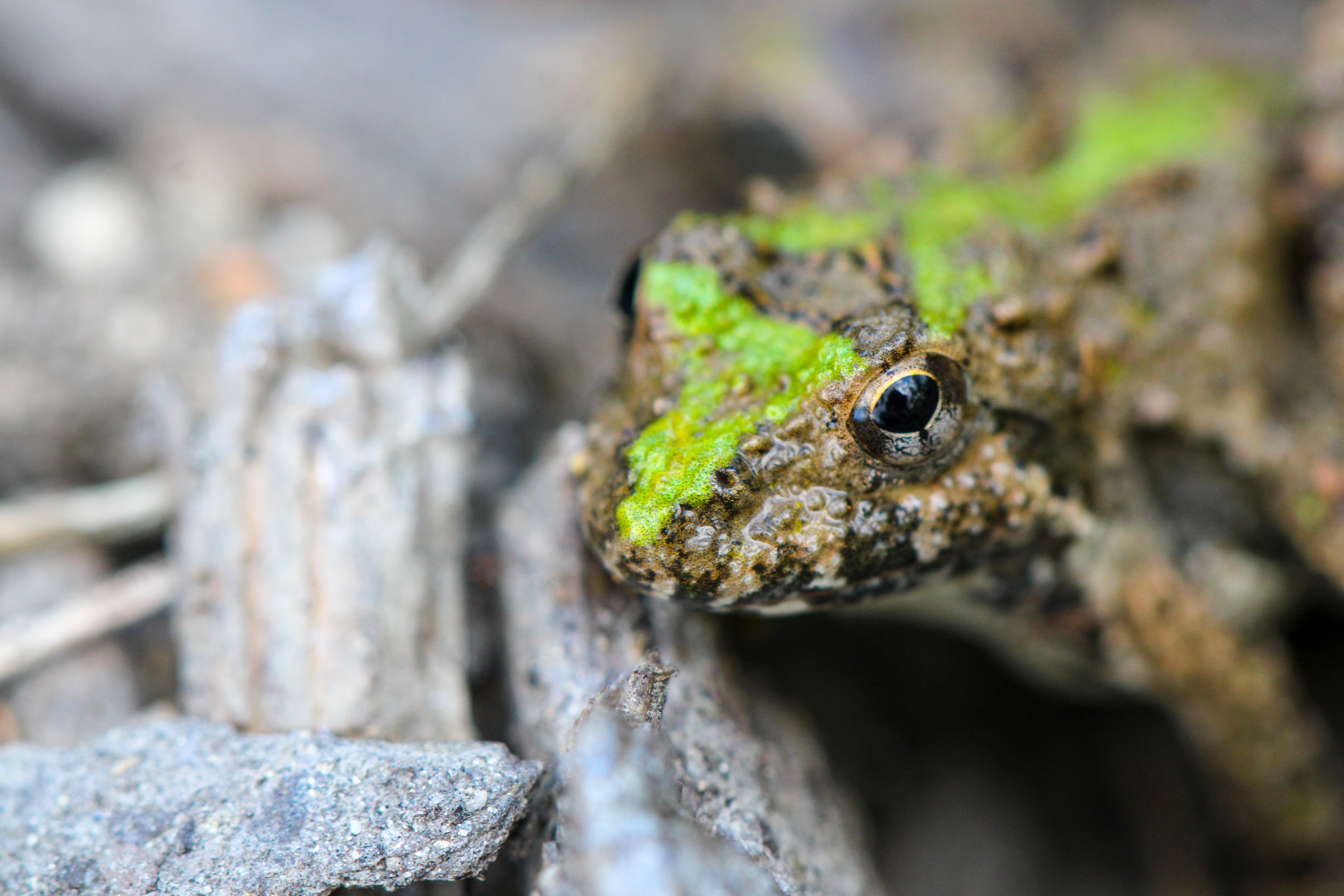
Northern cricket frog with prominent triangular dorsal coloration.

The dorsal stripes vary in brightness and hue and are not present until metamorphosis occurs. One New York biologist has identified six distinct color morphs and four pattern morphs, and several intergrades between these. Typically there is dark banding on the legs and a white bar from the eye to the base of the foreleg. The skin has a bumpy texture. It is very similar to the southern cricket frog, Acris gryllus, found in the US Southeastern Coastal Plain, but with some overlap along the Fall Line. The southern cricket frog has longer legs, with less webbing on the hind feet, and a more pointed snout, though northern cricket frogs have been observed with snouts indistinguishable from those of the southern species, and the markings on the back of the thigh are typically more sharply defined than that of the northern cricket frog, though biologists have recorded northern cricket frogs in the northern fringes of their range with extremely sharp posterior leg stripes. Northern cricket frogs do not have toe pads. This frog is active throughout most of the year, with activity significantly decreasing during December and resuming around mid-March.

== Habitat and distribution ==
Cricket frogs prefer the edges of slow-moving, permanent bodies of water. They prefer open, shallow waters with an abundance of aquatic vegetation. Some studies have found that cricket frogs may prefer sites that have some form of potential shelter, rocks for example, rather than be completely out in the open. Adults live in temperate environments while tadpoles live in shallow freshwater habitats with varying temperatures. Large groups of them can often be found together along the muddy banks of shallow streams, especially during pre-migratory clustering. The northern cricket frog has been observed to hibernate upland, often at considerable distances from water. There are various factors that influence microhabitat site selection for this species: temperature, proximity to water, shelter accessibility, etc.

=== Geographic distribution ===
- A. c. crepitans is found from New York, south to Florida, and west along the Gulf Coast states to Texas.
- A. c. paludicola occurs in southwestern Louisiana to East Texas.

== Conservation ==
Frogs such as A. crepitans are important as an indicator of wetland health and general environmental quality in the areas they inhabit.

== Speciation ==
The genus Acris is composed of three species: A. crepitans, A. blanchardi and A. gryllus (southern cricket frog).

=== Northern vs. southern cricket frog ===
The southern cricket frog has longer legs, with less webbing on the hind feet, and a more pointed snout, though northern cricket frogs have been observed with snouts indistinguishable from those of the southern species, and the markings on the back of the thigh are typically more sharply defined than that of the northern cricket frog, though biologists have recorded northern cricket frogs in the northern fringes of their range with extremely sharp posterior leg stripes. Compared to its southern counterpart, A. Crepitans is a stronger swimmer due to having more complete webbing on its feet. Additionally, it is less likely to hop on the water surface than the southern cricket frog. Northern cricket frogs in Mississippi live in open mud flats, call far from shore, and quickly dive into water when disturbed. Southern cricket frogs inhabit low vegetation near shores, call near shore, and escape into vegetation, and quickly return to land when forced into water.

=== Sub-species ===
- Eastern cricket frog, A. c. crepitans (Baird, 1854)
- Coastal cricket frog, A. c. paludicola (Burger, Smith and Smith, 1949)

== Diet ==
The diet of Northern cricket frogs is strongly correlated with what is abundant and available. The most abundant above-ground invertebrates are dipterans, homopterans and spiders. Cricket frogs consume more ground-dwelling prey but such prey account for less volume of food consumed. Bigger frogs consume prey of longer length: less ants, springtails, mites and more leafhoppers, damselflies, butterflies, moths, grasshoppers, crickets. Cricket frogs generally feed little on aquatic species. A study of 279 A. crepitan stomach contents showed that ground prey composed of 45.6% of prey and 20.7% of the stomach volume, above ground prey composed of 33% prey and 38.7% volume, and aquatic prey composed of 3.2% prey and 5.0% volume, with the remaining being unidentified prey and non-prey items.

== Mating ==
Breeding generally occurs from late spring through the summer (May through August). These frogs reach sexual maturity at about 20 mm snout-vent length. The males call from emergent vegetation with a high-pitched, short, pebble-like call which is repeated at an increasing rate. If there are many males in one particular area, they will modify their calls to increase their chances of getting a mate. The sound suggests pebbles being clicked together, much like a cricket, hence the name. These click-like pulses are combined to form calls, and calls are repeated in call groups. Calls increase in the number of pulses and note duration from beginning to end of a call group.

One egg is laid at a time, generally attached to a piece of vegetation. The 14 millimeters (0.55 in) tadpoles hatch in only a few days, and undergo metamorphosis in early fall. Maturity is usually reached in less than a year.

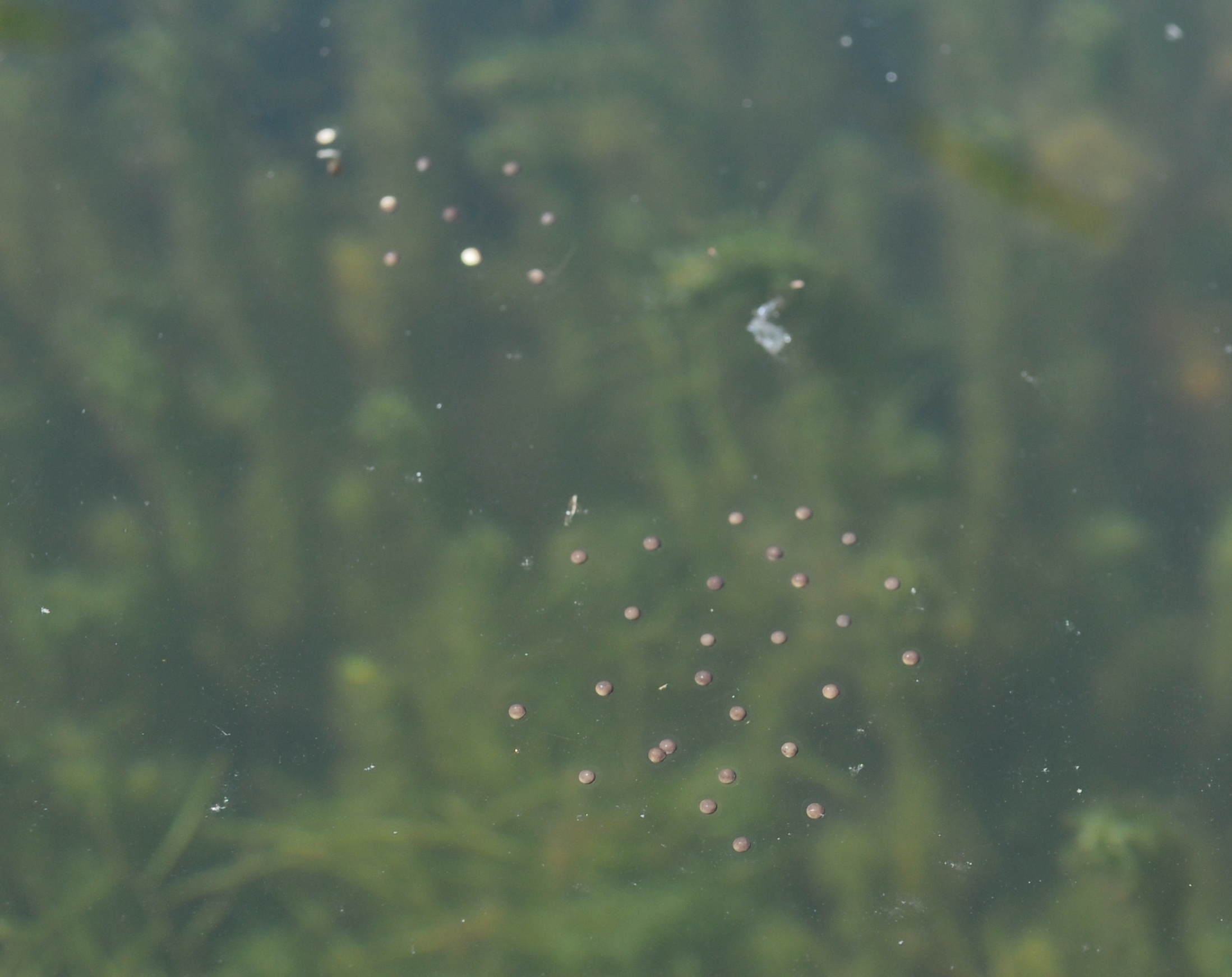
Acris crepitans eggs

=== Production of male calls ===
Almost all male frogs have a unique call with the purpose of attracting mates. These calls are defined by unique acoustic characteristics in order to attract female frogs of the same species. In frogs, auditory sounds are produced as a result of the interaction between the structure of the larynx (otherwise known as the voice box), vocal tract, and cartilages that control the flow of air out of lungs. Sound is produced when air hits the vocal cords, causing them to vibrate. The frequency of sound is dictated by the pressure of airflow through the larynx, as well as characteristics of vocal cords such as size and mass. Movements of various muscles in the throat and abdomen can create a pulsing sound.

Using snout vent length as an indicator of body size, researchers found that a longer snout vent length corresponded to a lower frequency call and lower pulse rate as well as fewer pulses in general. The production of lower frequency sounds can be attributed to the slower movements of larger physiological structures. High frequency calls were observed to have a shorter duration and faster pulse rate. Other findings of this study on Acris crepitans male calling, which perhaps offers insight into frog calling in general, include relationships between physical anatomy and auditory characteristics. A larger middle ear volume corresponded to a longer call duration, and the number of pulses in the calls showed a significant negative relationship with arytenoid cartilage, vocal cord and constrictor muscle volumes. The pulse rate is also correlated with vocal cord, basal cartilage and constrictor muscle volumes, but not with arytenoid cartilage or dilator muscle volumes.

Interestingly, northern cricket frog calls resemble calls of the Bufo genus even though two types of frogs are not closely phylogenetically related. Thus, the vocal mechanisms of the two frogs are assumed to operate the same way.

=== Variation in male calling ===
The calls at the beginning of a call group have been found to vary independently of calls from the middle and end of the call group. Researchers have found that nearest neighbor distance, measured through the sound-pressure level of nearby calls, exert the biggest effect on variation in male calling. Additionally, calling behavior significantly changes during aggressive encounters.

=== Female preference of male calls ===
The amphibian papilla and basilar papilla of Northern cricket frog ears are tuned, or sensitive, to different frequencies; the Amphibian papilla is more sensitive to lower frequencies, while the basilar papilla is more sensitive to higher frequencies. Both papilla are more sensitive to frequencies of conspecific calls rather than to the frequencies of the calls of other species. Frogs of the same species generally prefer local calls, which are calls of other frogs located geographically close. One study demonstrated that the basilar papilla tuning is different among Northern cricket frog females from three different populations (Bastrop, Austin, Indiana), with Bastrop frogs having the highest tuning and Austin frogs having the lowest. Further tests demonstrated that some populations showed a preference to local rather than foreign calls, while other populations preferred foreign calls, and some with no preference. However, if there is a preference for call type, females generally prefer lower frequency calls. There appears to be a reasonable explanation for such a preference, since larger males produce lower frequency calls. Attraction to larger males is beneficial since larger males fertilize more females eggs. More specifically larger females are more sensitive to and prefer lower frequencies, while smaller females prefer higher frequencies.

=== Male mating tactics ===
Subordinate males that have recently matured and cannot effectively compete with dominant male display patterns use alternative mating tactics, such as satellite behavior. The satellite tactic is intercepting and mating with females going toward other calling males. Interestingly, the frequency of this tactic is not related to the size of males.

Other hylid species such as H. cinerea switch from calling to satellite in proximity of other strong-calling males. A study observed much fewer A. crepitans switching tactics, which can be explained by the overall lower occurrence of satellite males, less risk of predation, or lower mating success rate for satellite males of this species.

=== Biological reproductive patterns ===
The lipid stores of both males and females are lower during the breeding season than in non-breeding periods (pre-breeding, post-breeding, post-hibernation). Observation of dissected stomachs of males indicate that feeding is minimal or non-existent during the breeding season. Since feeding is reduced, males metabolize more lipids during this period. Lower lipid stores in females can be explained by an increase in ovarian size during the breeding season.

== Predators ==
Northern cricket frogs are preyed upon by a number of species, including birds (such as great-tailed grackles and American kestrels), snakes (such as common watersnakes, Concho water snakes and eastern garter snakes), fish (such as black bass), and other frogs (such as American bullfrogs). To escape predators, they are capable of leaping up to 3 feet in a single jump and are excellent swimmers. Northern cricket frogs are seen to have one of the furthest jump distances relative to its body size. It has been found that not only temperature, but hydration also has an effect on how far these frogs can jump. Being hydrated at a higher temperature is thought to allow them to jump farther and higher.

== Physiology ==
=== Sun compass orientation ===
Many animals can navigate using the sun as a compass in combination with an internal clock providing a sense of time, which is known as sun compass orientation. Other orientation cues used by cricket frogs include the moon and stars. Acris crepitans and A. gryllus, both cricket frogs, have been observed to show similar orienting mechanisms, namely the Y-axis concept. The Y-axis is a reference axis established by land and water. Frogs require information about shore position, direct view of a celestial cue, and sense of time in order for the successful use of Y-axis type of orientation during the day.

=== Sex determination ===
Numerous environmental factors have been associated with sex determination in amphibians, including temperature, pH, and presence of foreign chemicals that affect the gonads. A study observing Northern cricket frogs in environments contaminated with organochlorides concluded that sites contaminated with point polychlorinated biphenyl (PCB) and polychlorinated dibenzofuran (PCDF) were significantly related to sex-ratio reversal: contaminated sites had more males compared to control ponds, suggesting that organochlorines can influence cricket frog sexual differentiation. For example, the same study had shown that in certain parts of Illinois that are more industrialized and had organochlorine peptides there was a larger proportion of intersex frogs. In the case of Illinois, this was in the northeast. However, more environmentally friendly regions, like southern Illinois, had a more diverse frog population.

=== Immunology vs. reproduction ===
Metabolic resources are allocated to different physiological systems. The amount of allocation may vary with changing external conditions and thus internal demands. Much research has been conducted to demonstrate the balance of resources between immunity and reproduction, including that of Acris crepitans. Male northern cricket frogs were collected at the peak of the breeding season and injected with sheep blood cells to elicit an immune response. Researchers found that spermatic cyst diameter, germinal epithelium depth, and gonadosomatic index were smaller in the injected males compared to males injected with saline (control) as well as their noninjected counterparts. This suggests that sperm production decreases under immunological stress. More generally and importantly, these results demonstrate that resource investment in reproduction decreases as more resources must be allocated to the immune system under immunologically-challenging conditions.

=== Thermoregulation ===
Northern cricket frogs are diurnal and generally active much of the year, except in midwinter in northern areas when the water is frozen. They are freeze resistant so during winter months, they stay underground near the surface to resist freezing. Individuals can increase the concentration of body fluids to lower their freezing points, making them resistant to supercooling and flashpoint freezing.

== Morphology ==
Acris crepitans are morphologically unique among hylids because of their unusually small size, as well as their bumpy skin that is not really seen in the family of Hylidae. A snout vent length of 20mm marks sexual maturity. Females are slightly larger than males and can reach a maximum snout vent length of 38mm. The northern cricket frog's overall small size and limited skull ossification suggests miniaturization of this species. Miniaturization, or the evolution of a smaller body size, due to changes in anatomy, physiology, life history, and behavior over time. For this species, the necessity to rapidly attain sexual maturity could explain its miniaturization; frogs grow 12 to 26 mm within a few months in preparation for the breeding season.

The cranial cartilages of these frogs are very mineralized with calcium, which reinforce cartilage as frogs develop into adulthood. These frogs possess small, thin, and long nasals, which is consistent with its being a small anuran. The nasals take a triangle-like shape. Other skeletal abnormalities of A. crepitans include lateral asymmetry in development of vomerine teeth and parasphenoid alae as well as tumor-like growth on the femur.

Several hypotheses have been presented in an attempt to explain the observed abnormalities in this frog: small skeletal malformations are normally present at a high rate in this species, stress caused by habitat fragmentation, or there is environmental contamination.

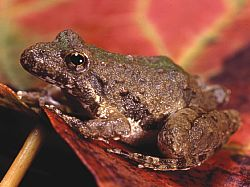
Acris crepitans blanchardi
