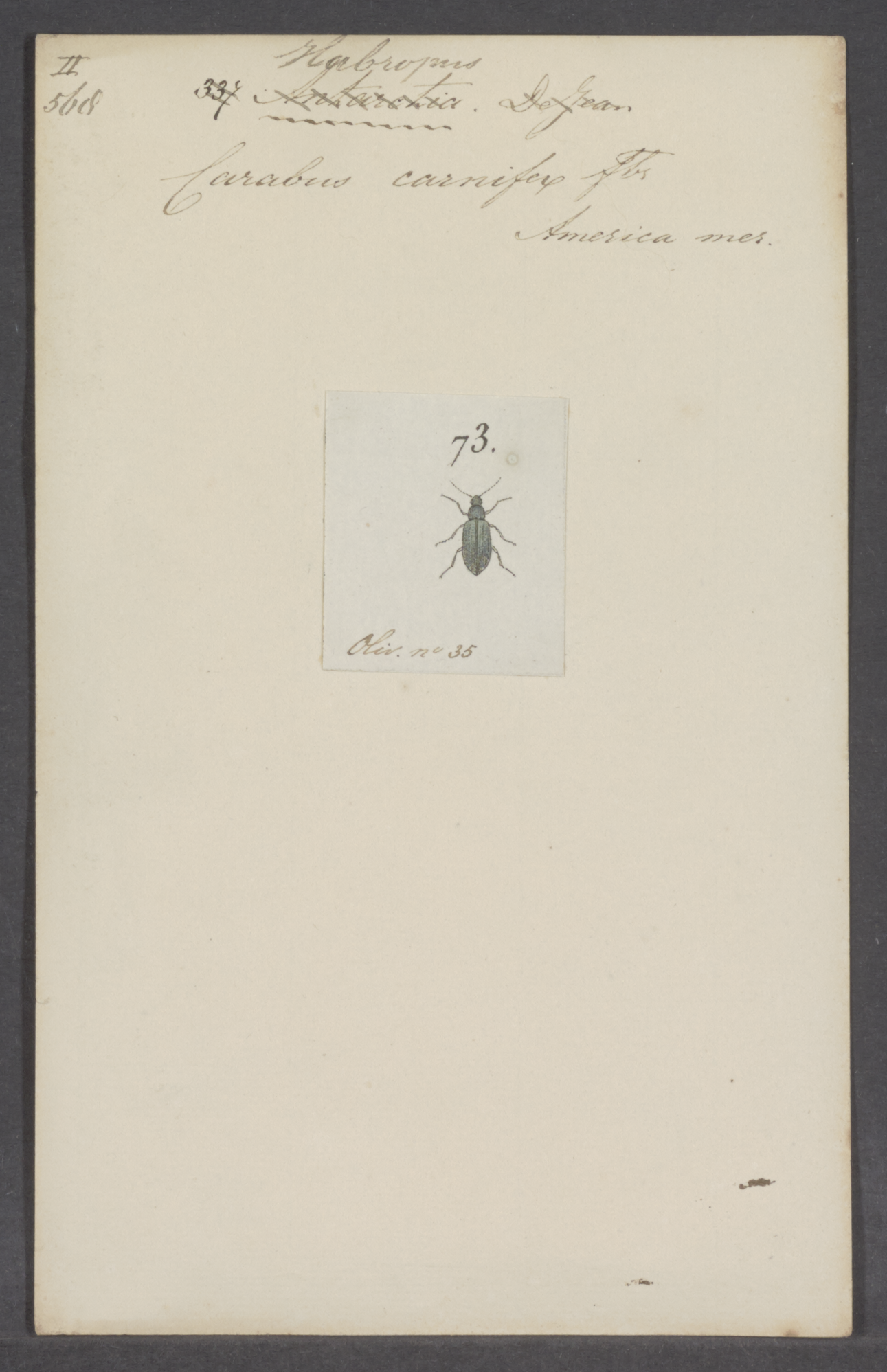

Scientific classification
- Domain: Eukaryota
- Kingdom: Animalia
- Phylum: Arthropoda
- Class: Insecta
- Order: Coleoptera
- Suborder: Adephaga
- Family: Carabidae
- Genus: Abropus; Waterhouse, 1842
- Species: A. carnifex

Binomial name
- Abropus carnifex (Fabricius, 1775)

= Abropus =

Genus of beetles

Abropus carnifex is a species of beetle in the family Carabidae, the only species in the genus Abropus.
