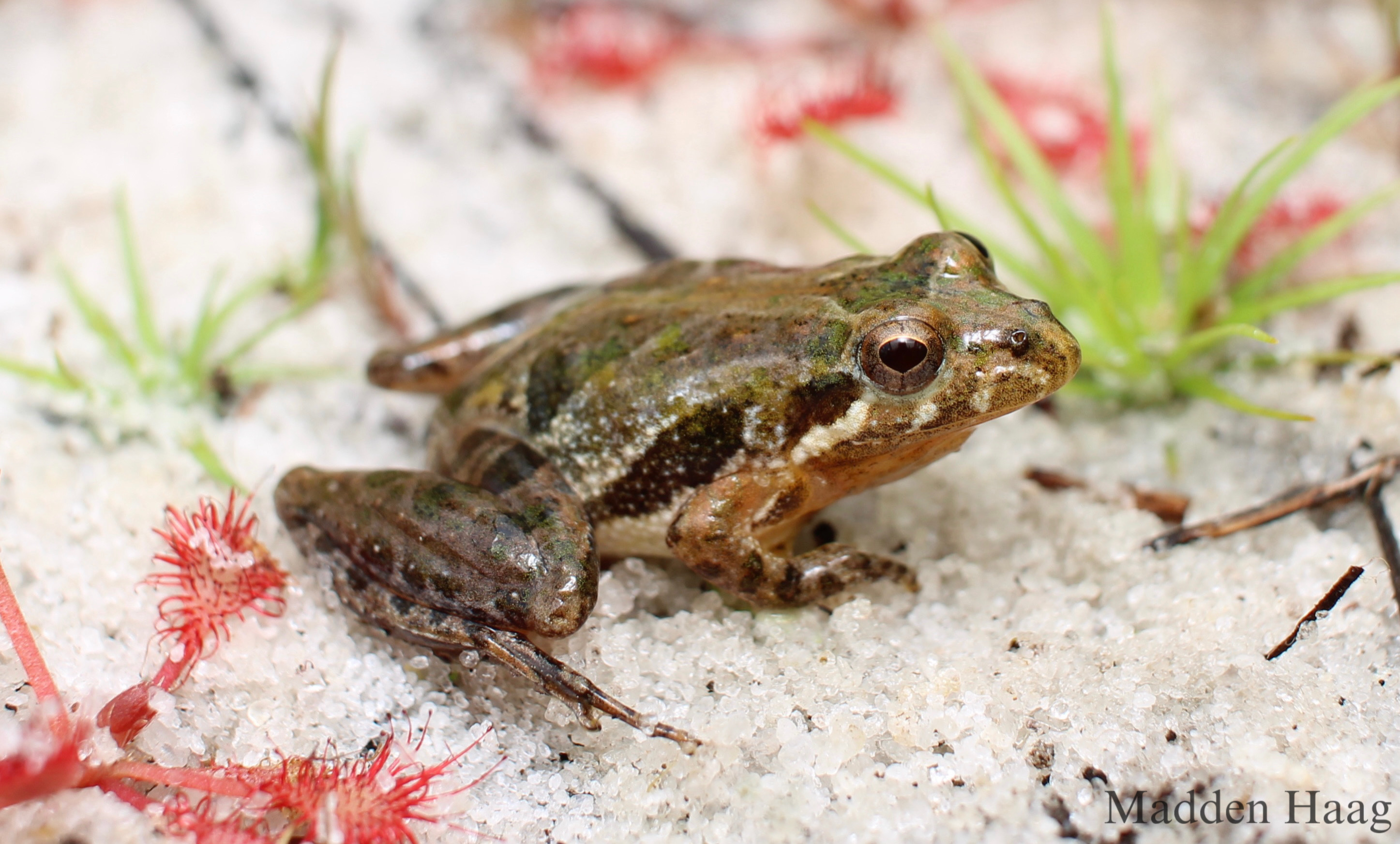

Conservation status
- Least Concern (IUCN 3.1)

Scientific classification
- Kingdom: Animalia
- Phylum: Chordata
- Class: Amphibia
- Order: Anura
- Family: Hylidae
- Genus: Acris
- Species: A. gryllus

Binomial name
- Acris gryllus (Le Conte, 1825)

Subspecies
- Acris gryllus dorsalis (Harlan, 1827); Acris gryllus gryllus (Le Conte, 1825)
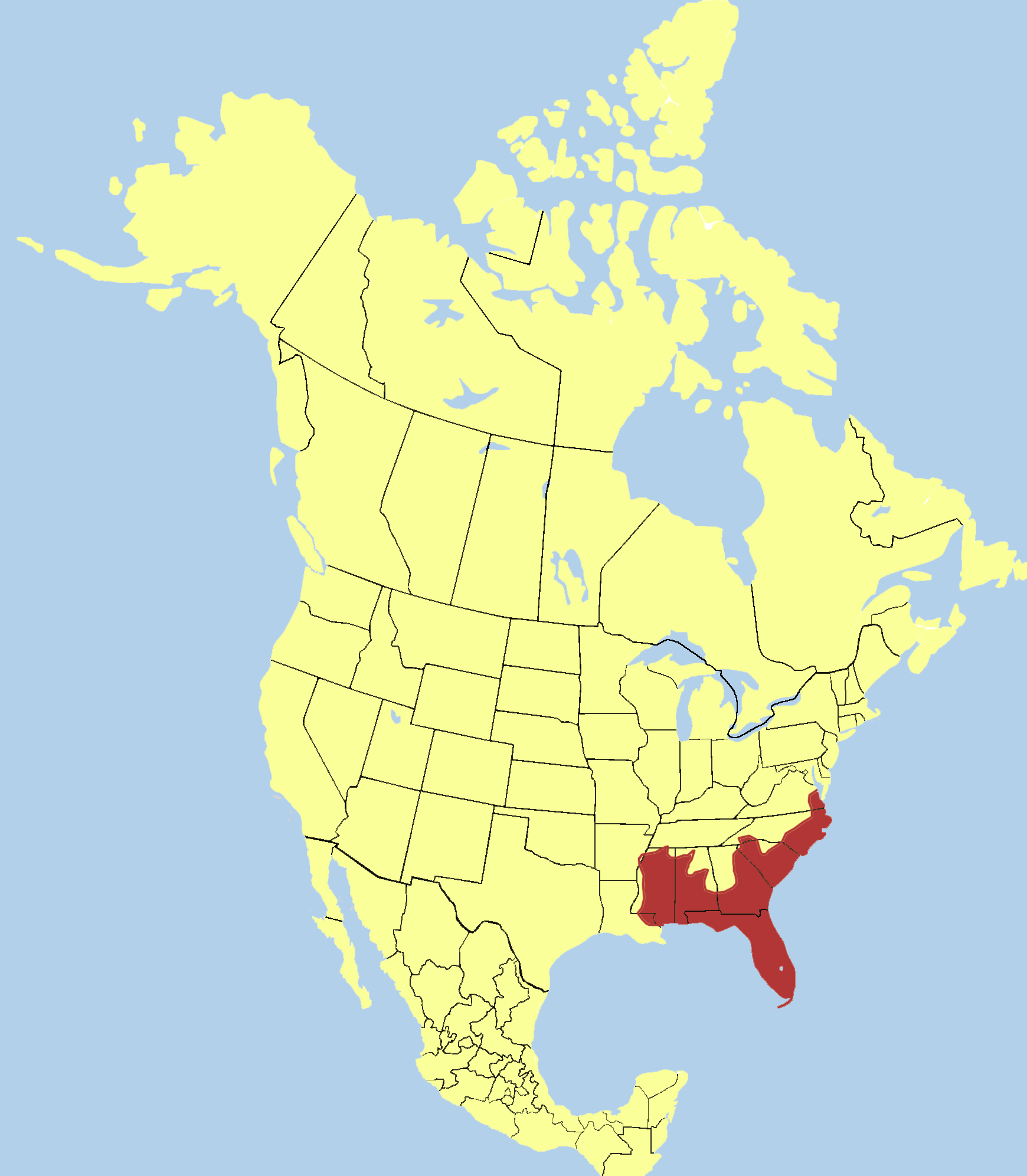
- The distribution of the southern cricket frog

Synonyms
- Rana gryllus Le Conte, 1825; Rana dorsalis Harlan, 1827; Hylodes gryllus (Le Conte, 1825)

= Southern cricket frog =

Species of amphibian

The southern cricket frog or southeastern cricket frog (Acris gryllus) is a small hylid frog native to the Southeastern United States. It is very similar in appearance and habits to the northern cricket frog, Acris crepitans, and was considered formerly conspecific (Dickerson 1906). The scientific name Acris is from the Greek word for locust, and the species name gryllus is Latin for cricket (Georgia Wildlife).

== Description ==
At 0.75–1.5 inches (16–32 mm) in length, Acris gryllus is even smaller than A. crepitans. Other characters that differentiate the southern species are:

- More pointed snout--A. crepitans more blunt.
- Hind leg is more than half length of the body when folded—that of A. crepitans is less than one half body length. When rear leg is extended forward, the heel of A. gryllus usually reaches beyond the snout—does not reach snout in A. crepitans.
- A. gryllus can jump longer distances than A. crepitans.
- A. gryllus has a sharply defined black stripe on the back of the thigh--A. crepitans has a ragged stripe.
- Webbing on rear feet of A. gryllus is sparse, more extensive in A. crepitans.

There is evidence that the color of the vertebral stripe on southern cricket frogs can vary temporally and can change within one frog's lifetime.

== Range and habitat ==
The southern cricket frog is characteristic of coastal plain bogs, bottomland swamps, ponds, and ditches. It prefers sunny areas, and is usually not found in woodlands. Subspecies Acris gryllus gryllus is found in the Atlantic Coastal Plain from southeastern Virginia through the Carolinas, Georgia, Alabama, and Mississippi, west to the Mississippi River. It is found mostly east of the Fall Line, but extends into more upland areas of the Piedmont along river valleys. Subspecies Acris gryllus dorsalis is found throughout the Florida peninsula.

== Habits ==
The southern cricket frog feeds on insects, spiders, and other arthropods. It is active throughout the year in warm weather.

== Reproduction ==
Male calling and entering amplexus

Breeding is in late spring and summer. The advertisement call of the males is a loud rapid gick, gick, gick. Up to 150 eggs are laid at a time, and more than one mass may be produced in a season (Martof et al. 1980).

== Subspecies ==
- Acris gryllus dorsalis (Harlan, 1827) – Florida cricket frog
- Acris gryllus gryllus (LeConte, 1825) – Coastal plain cricket frog, southern cricket frog
