= Metoecis =

Scientific classification
- Domain: Eukaryota
- Kingdom: Animalia
- Phylum: Arthropoda
- Class: Insecta
- Order: Lepidoptera
- Family: Pyralidae
- Subfamily: Phycitinae
- Genus: Metoecis; Mabille, 1879
- Species: M. carnifex

Binomial name
- Metoecis carnifex (Coquerel, 1855)

Synonyms
- Chilo carnifex Coquerel, 1855; Metoecis lepidocerella Mabille, 1879

Genus of moths

Metoecis is a monotypic snout moth genus described by Paul Mabille in 1879. Its only species, Metoecis carnifex, was described by Charles Coquerel in 1855. It is found on Madagascar and South Africa.
