= Frog hearing and communication =

Frog and toad communication

Frogs and toads produce a rich variety of sounds, calls, and songs during their courtship and mating rituals. The callers, usually males, make stereotyped sounds in order to advertise their location, their mating readiness and their willingness to defend their territory; listeners respond to the calls by return calling, by approach, and by going silent. These responses have been shown to be important for species recognition, mate assessment, and localization. Beginning with the pioneering experiments of Robert Capranica in the 1930s using playback techniques with normal and synthetic calls, behavioral biologists and neurobiologists have teamed up to use frogs and toads as a model system for understanding the auditory function and evolution. It is now considered an important example of the neural basis of animal behavior, because of the simplicity of the sounds, the relative ease with which neurophysiological recordings can be made from the auditory nerve, and the reliability of localization behavior. Acoustic communication is essential for the frog's survival in both territorial defense and in localization and attraction of mates. Sounds from frogs travel through the air, through water, and through the substrate. Frogs and toads largely ignore sounds that are not conspecific calls or those of predators, with only louder noises startling the animals. Even then, unless major vibration is included, they usually do not take any action unless the source has been visually identified. The neural basis of communication and audition gives insights into the science of sound applied to human communication.

== Sound communication ==
=== Behavioral ecology ===
Frogs are more often heard than seen, and other frogs (and researchers) rely on their calls to identify them. Depending on the region that the frog lives in, certain times of the year are better for breeding than others, and frogs may live away from the best breeding grounds when it is not the species’ mating season. During the breeding season, they congregate to the best breeding site and compete for call time and recognition. Species that have a narrow mating season due to ponds that dry up have the most vigorous calls.

=== Calling strategy ===
==== Male-male competition ====
In multiple frog species only males call. Each species has a distinct call, though even among the same species, different dialects are found in different regions. Although humans cannot detect the differences in dialects, frogs distinguish between regional dialects. For example, male bullfrogs can recognize the calls of their direct territorial neighbors. By ignoring the calls of these neighbors, they save energy, and only vocalize aggressively in response to an intruder's call. In this way, calls establish territories, but they also attract females. Males may have a solitary call for times when there is no competition that uses less energy. During other times, when a frog must compete with hundreds or thousands of other frogs to be heard, together they perform a chorus call where each frog calls in turn, successively. The most important feature of the chorus is the shared pattern. Through this pattern, few individuals calls are drowned out. One frog's call may be dominant and trigger the calls of the responding frogs in symphony. Calling is linked to physical size and females may be attracted to more vigorous calls. Frogs in the same region chorus within their species and between different species. Frogs of the same species will retune their frequency so it is distinct from other frogs of the same species. Different species of frogs living in the same region have more dramatically different call frequencies. The frequency and durations of different species' calls vary similarly to the preference of that species' females. The neural circuitry of females of different species varies.

A frog which demonstrates vocalizations in male-male competition is the Lithobates clamitans aka the Green Frog. Typically, they have four types of calls each warning a different level of urgency and each being distinct. The first two calls are types of advertisement calls to establish dominance among the challengers. The other two calls are more directed towards agonistic encounters.

==== Male-female interactions ====
Like the males, females can distinguish the minute differences between individual frogs. However, males and females are attuned to different parts of the advertisement call. For example, males of the onomatopoeically named coqui species are more attuned to the low frequency co part of the call, whereas females are more attuned to the high frequency qui. In fact, the order of the parts does not matter. Similarly, for females of the Tungara species, the female basilar papilla is biased towards a lower-than-average “chuck” portion of a male call. Experiments that measure the vocal responses and approaches shows these attenuations.

=== Mode of sound communication ===
Calls are often sent through the air, but other mediums have been discovered. Some species call while they are underwater and the sound travels through the water. This is adaptive in a region with multiple species competing for air time. Narins has found female frog species that use solid surfaces, such as blades of grass and logs, upon which they tap rhythmically to attract mates. Also, Feng, Narins and colleagues have found that some species of frogs use ultrasound.

== Sound production ==
The smallest frogs expend much energy to produce calls. In order for vocalizations to be produced, the respiratory airflow goes from the lungs, passing through the larynx, and into the oral cavity. The vocal cords then oscillate as a result. In addition, vocalizing muscles can make up 15% of a male spring peeper's body mass, while the same muscles are only 3% of females. Frogs produce sound from the air sac below their mouth that from the outside, is seen to inflate and deflate. Air from the lungs is channeled to the air sac, which resonates to make the sound louder. The larynx is larger and more developed in males, though not significantly different from females.

Frogs produce two types of calls that most experiments tend to focus on, which are release calling and mating calling. Only the male frogs are able to produce mating calls to attract gravid female frogs. When male and non-gravid female frogs are clasped by sexually active male frogs, they produce a release call. In the leopard frog, there are three movements for their sound production. First, there are body wall contradictions to serve as a way for the intra-pulmonary pressure to increase. Second, in order for air flow to pass through the larynx, the glottis must be open. Third and last, in the larynx, the vocal cords must oppose each other at the midline so that the air flow can cause them to vibrate. In addition, their release calls and movements of their throats and sides are correlated with laryngeal calling movements. For the Concave-eared torrent frog (Amolops tormotus), they produce sounds in the ultrasonic range. Three areas that are highly involved in frog calls are the preoptic area, the medulla-midbrain junction, and the medulla-spinal cord junction. The preoptic area is important in order the frog to initiate mate calling. The medulla-midbrain junction is responsible for producing the calling motor pattern. The medulla-spinal cord junction contains the hypoglossal and vagus nuclei, which are vital to organize the calling and breathing motor patterns.

== Sound localization ==
Biologists believed that frogs ears are placed too close together to localize sound accurately. Frogs cannot hear short, high frequency sounds. Sound is localized by the time difference when the sound reaches each ear. The “vibration spot” near the lungs vibrates in response to sound, and may be used as an additional measure to localize from.

== Applications of frog neuroethology ==
Dr. Feng's work applies the neuroethology of frog communication to medicine. A recent project on hearing aids is based on how female frogs find their mates. Females must recognize the male they choose by his call. By localizing where his call is coming from she can find him. An additional challenge is that she is localizing his call while listening to the other frogs in the chorus, and to the noise of the stream and insects. The breeding pond is a very noisy place, and females must distinguish a male's calls from the other noise. How they recognize the sound pattern of the male they are pursuing from the surrounding noise is similar to how intelligent hearing aids help people hear certain sounds and cancel out others. The underlying neural mechanisms are fast neural oscillations, and synaptic inhibition to cancel out noise. The timing and frequency of the sound also play a part in frog communication and may be used in Feng's work. He also studies bat echolocation to create intelligent hearing aids. He is also working on cochlear implants.

== See also ==
- Neuroethology
- Frogs
- Umwelt
- Vision in toads
- Animal echolocation
