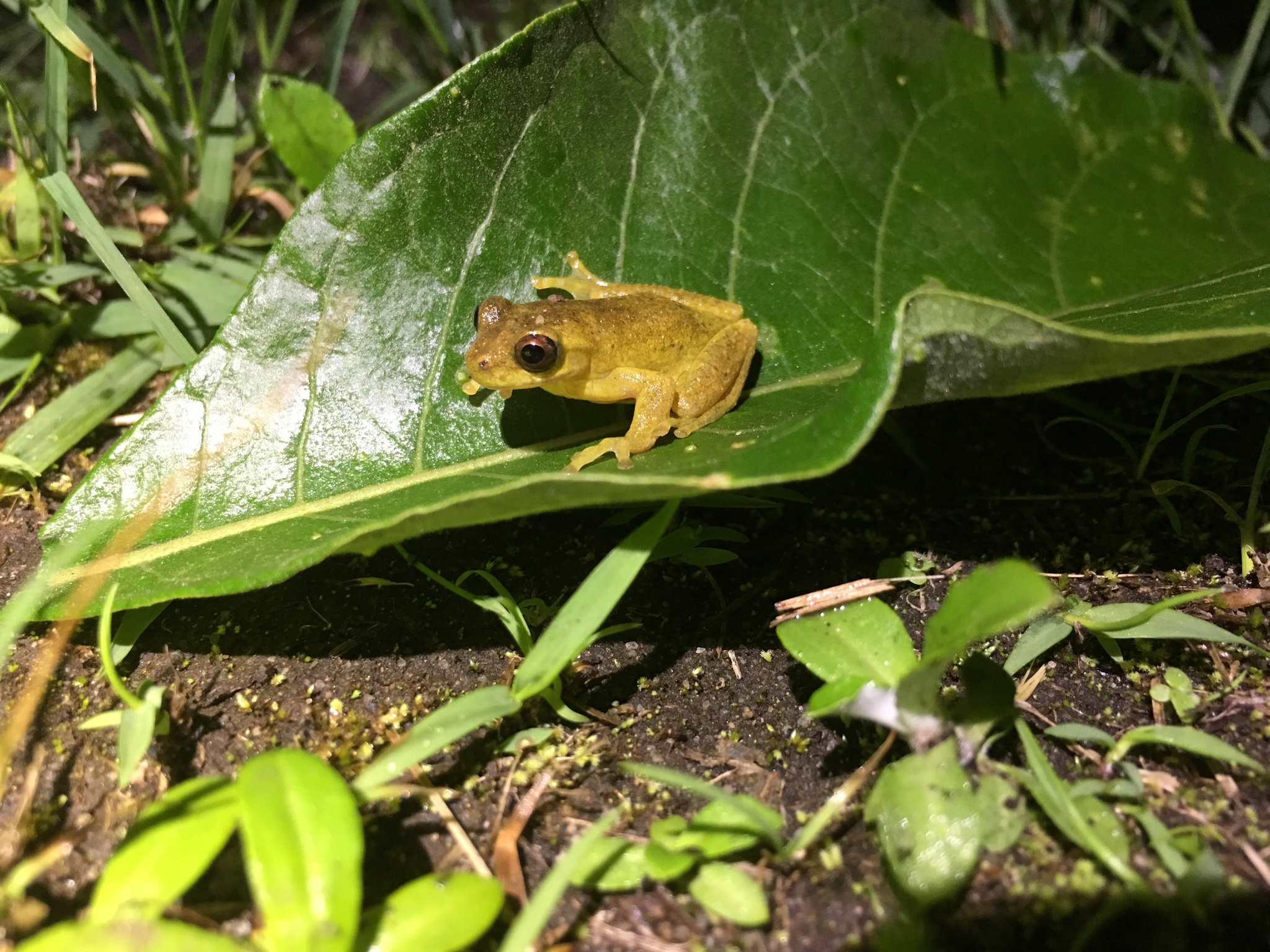
- An executioner clownfrog sitting on a large leaf in the Ecuador forest

Conservation status
- Least Concern (IUCN 3.1)

Scientific classification
- Kingdom: Animalia
- Phylum: Chordata
- Class: Amphibia
- Order: Anura
- Family: Hylidae
- Genus: Dendropsophus
- Species: D. carnifex

Binomial name
- Dendropsophus carnifex (Duellman, 1969)

= Dendropsophus carnifex =

Species of amphibian

Dendropsophus carnifex, the executioner tree frog, executioner clown frog or hangman swamp frog, is a species of frog in the family Hylidae.

It is found in Ecuador and possibly Colombia. Its natural habitats are between 1250 and 2500 meters above sea level in subtropical or tropical forests, subtropical or tropical moist montane forests, swamps, freshwater marshes, intermittent freshwater marshes, plantations, rural gardens, heavily degraded former forest, ponds, and canals and ditches.

This frog has a snout-vent length under 3.5 cm and proportionately large climbing disks on its toes. Its body is robust and longer than it is wide. Its front and hind feet are webbed, but there is more webbing on the hind feet. The male frog does not have nuptial pads.

Most tree frogs are pale, but some are bright in color as well. Tree frogs' back can be bronze-green or bronze-gray in color, with brown or brown-gray marks. Its belly is yellow or yellowish-white in color. There are a few tree frogs with bright colors as well helping improve their fitness. The color of its body can help a tree frog camouflage from predators and help hide from their prey before consuming them. Their bodies also assist in maintaining their body temperature, protect against harmful sunlight radiation, and it can also help them interact with other tree frogs (Pintanel et al., 2019, p. 1298).

This frog's English and Latin names refer to John D. Lynch, who collected many of the samples. "Lynching" is a form of execution.
