= List of amphibians of Florida =

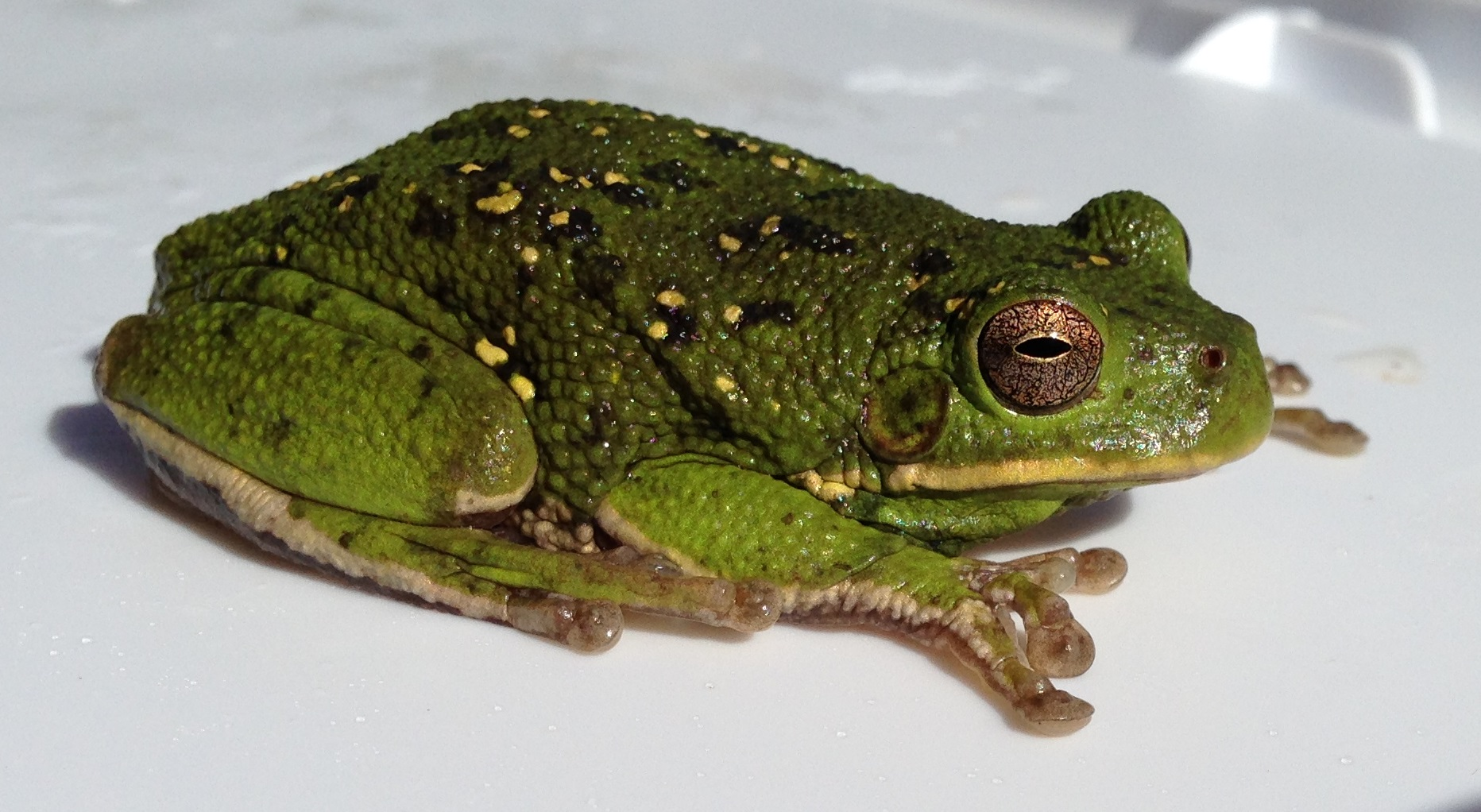
The barking tree frog is the state's amphibian.

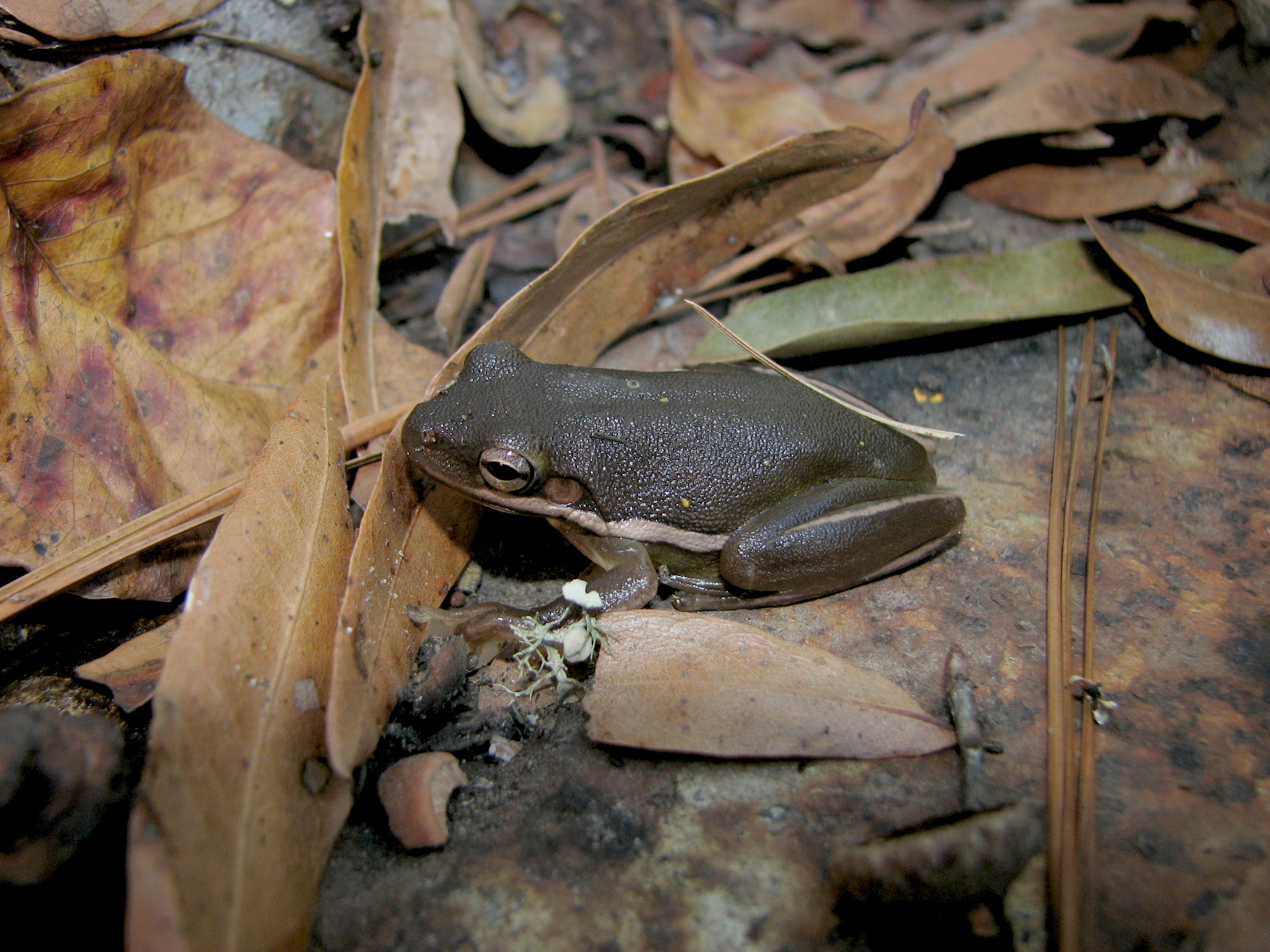
American green tree frogs vary in color.

This list of amphibians of Florida includes species native to or documented in the U.S. state of Florida.

== Amphibians ==
=== American spadefoot toads (Scaphiopodidae) ===
- Eastern spadefoot

=== Amphiuma (Amphiumidae) ===
- One-toed amphiuma
- Three-toed amphiuma - introduced
- Two-toed amphiuma

=== Aquatic caecilians (Typhlonectidae) ===
- Rio Rauca caecilian - introduced/invasive

=== Lungless salamanders (Plethodontidae) ===
- Apalachicola dusky salamander
- Bog dwarf salamander
- Dwarf salamander
- Dwarf waterdog
- Four-toed salamander
- Georgia blind salamander
- Many-lined salamander
- Rusty mud salamander
- Southeastern slimy salamander
- Seal salamander
- Southeastern dwarf salamander
- Southern dusky salamander
- Southern red salamander
- Three-lined salamander

=== Mole salamanders (Ambystomatidae) ===
- Eastern tiger salamander
- Frosted flatwoods salamander
- Marbled salamander
- Mole salamander
- Reticulated flatwoods salamander

=== Narrow-mouthed frogs (Microhylidae) ===
- Eastern narrow-mouthed toad

=== Rain frogs (Eleutherodactylidae) ===
- Common coquí - introduced/invasive
- Greenhouse frog - introduced/invasive

=== Sirens (Sirenidae) ===
- Dwarf siren
- Greater siren
- Lesser siren
- Northern dwarf siren
- Reticulated siren
- Southern dwarf siren

=== Tongueless frogs (Pipidae) ===
- African clawed frog - introduced/invasive
- Western clawed frog - introduced/invasive

=== Tree frogs (Hylidae) ===
- American green tree frog
- Australian green tree frog - introduced/invasive
- Barking tree frog
- Bird-voiced tree frog
- Cope's gray tree frog
- Cuban tree frog - introduced/invasive
- Gray tree frog
- Little grass frog
- Northern cricket frog
- Ornate chorus frog
- Pine Barrens tree frog
- Pine woods tree frog
- Southern chorus frog
- Southern cricket frog
- Spring peeper
- Squirrel tree frog
- Upland chorus frog

=== True frogs (Ranidae) ===
- American bullfrog
- Bronze frog
- Carpenter frog
- Florida bog frog
- Gopher frog
- Pig frog
- Rana clamitans - locally called "green frog"
- River frog
- Southern leopard frog

=== True salamanders and newts (Salamandridae) ===
- Eastern newt
- Striped newt

=== True toads (Bufonidae) ===
- Cane toad - introduced/invasive
- Fowler's toad
- Gulf Coast toad
- Oak toad
- Southern toad

== See also ==
- List of birds of Florida
- List of mammals of Florida
- List of reptiles of Florida
- List of snakes of Florida
- List of fishes of Florida
- List of invasive species in Florida
- List of invasive species in the Everglades
- Fauna of Florida
