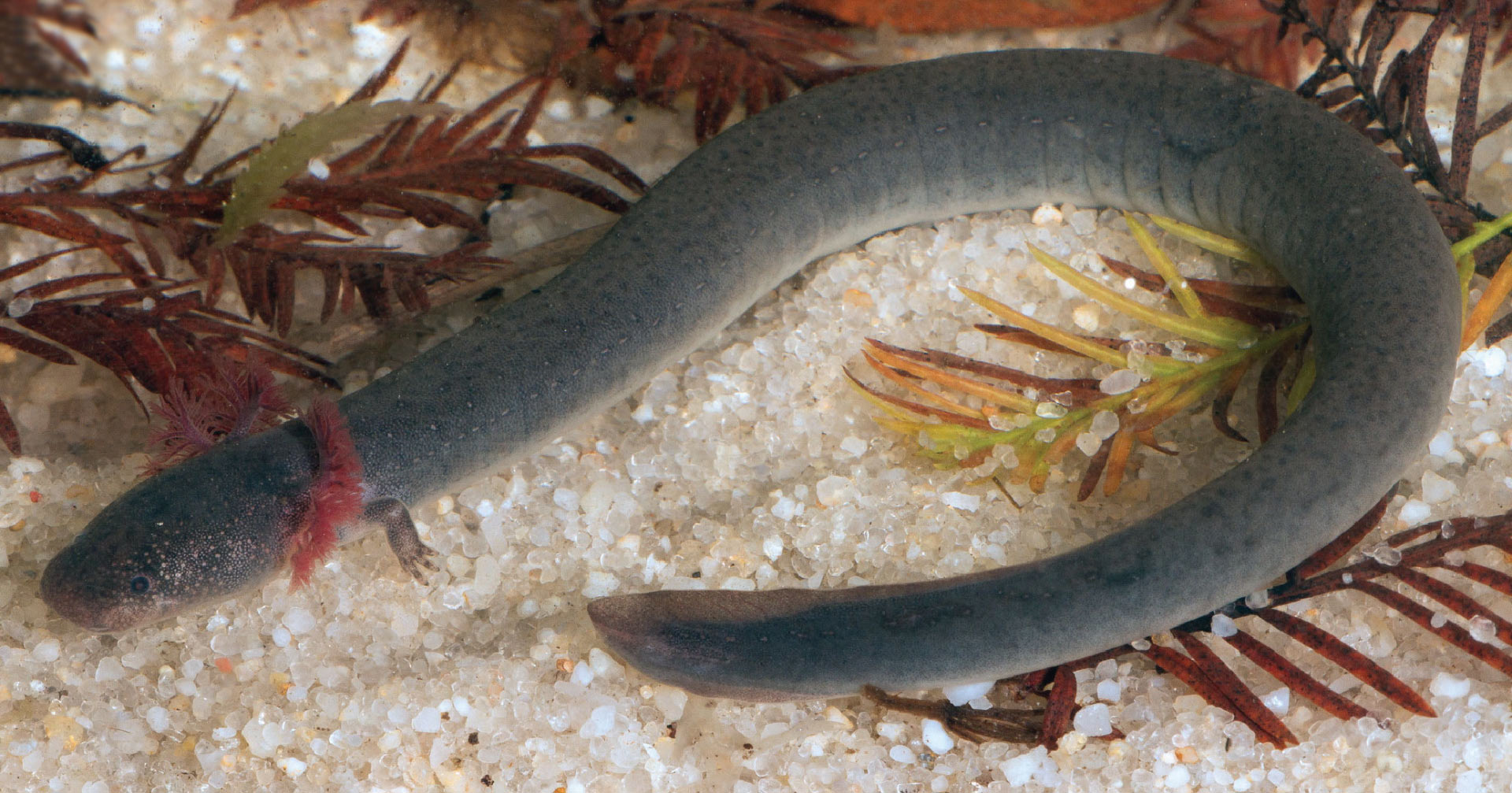

Scientific classification
- Kingdom: Animalia
- Phylum: Chordata
- Class: Amphibia
- Order: Urodela
- Family: Sirenidae
- Genus: Siren
- Species: S. sphagnicola

Binomial name
- Siren sphagnicola Fedler, Enge, & Moler, 2023

= Seepage siren =

Species of amphibian

The seepage siren (Siren sphagnicola) is a species of aquatic salamander in the family Sirenidae. It was described as a new species in 2023 by Fedler et al. It is the smallest known species of siren.

== History of discovery ==
The presence of small, seepage-dwelling sirens in the basins of the Blackwater, East Bay, and Yellow Rivers in Florida that did not match any formally described species has been known to scientists since approximately the 1980s. An unpublished genetic study of Florida sirens was done in the 1990s, which included specimens of both the seepage species and what would later be identified as the reticulated siren. A 2005 trapping of a number of specimens of the still-unnamed species referred to them as "least sirens" within Siren intermedia. The species was formally analyzed and named by Fedler, Enge, and Moler in 2023.

The discovery of Siren sphagnicola highlights the ongoing description of new species in the Gulf Coastal Plain, a global biodiversity hotspot. This discovery, along with others like the reticulated or leopard siren (Siren reticulata) described in 2018, underscores the importance of habitat protection and the need for further research to understand these species' roles in their ecosystems.

== Description ==
Like other Siren species, the seepage siren is an elongated animal with feathery external gills, four-toed forelimbs, and absent pelvis and hindlimbs. It is primarily gray in color, sometimes with brown tints. Body parts regenerated after injury tend to lack pigmentation. Black spotting is sometimes present on the head. Juvenile individuals lack the yellow, orange, or red markings and yellow labial stripe present in other Siren and Pseudobranchus juveniles.

The seepage siren is the smallest known species of sirenid, being on average smaller than both its congenerics and the dwarf sirens in Pseudobranchus. Reproductively mature adults have been measured in a range of 71–126 millimetres (2.8–5.0 in) in snout–vent length (111–196 millimetres (4.4–7.7 in) in total length).

== Distribution and habitat ==
A stretch of the Blackwater River within Blackwater River State Park, showing large mats of dense, waterlogged vegetation

The seepage siren has been encountered primarily in the Florida Panhandle and coastal Alabama in the region around Choctawhatchee Bay. It has been recorded in the drainages of the Blackwater, Yellow, and Conecuh Rivers and in Eglin Air Force Base. Genetic testing of museum specimens indicates that its range may extend further into the Florida Parishes of Louisiana. It is locally abundant and widely distributed in suitable locations within its range.

It is primarily found in seepages with dense plant or detritus cover, shallow muck-filled streams, and Sphagnum bogs. It lives in mats of waterlogged vegetation such as moss and roots tangles, in deep pools of fluid muck, and in areas of dense mud or leaf mats along margins of streams and wetland environments. It is not found within deeply eroded stream beds, as stronger currents and rain prevent the buildup of suitable areas of clinging vegetation, detritus, or sediment.
