= Habrosaurus =

Habrosaurus Temporal range: 84.9–58.7 Ma
- Fossil vertebrae and jaw, Hong Kong Science Museum

Scientific classification
- Kingdom: Animalia
- Phylum: Chordata
- Class: Amphibia
- Order: Urodela
- Family: Sirenidae
- Genus: †Habrosaurus; Gilmore, 1928

Type species
- †Habrosaurus dilatus Gilmore, 1928

Other species
- †Habrosaurus prodilatus Gardner, 2003

Synonyms
- †Adelphesiren olivae Goin and Auffenberg, 1958

Extinct genus of salamanders

Habrosaurus, meaning "graceful lizard", is an extinct genus of prehistoric salamanders, and the oldest and largest known member of the family Sirenidae. Two species are known, H. prodilatus from the middle Campanian Dinosaur Park Formation of Alberta, and H. dilatus from the late Maastrichtian and Paleocene of western North America. It is relatively common in the Lance Formation of Wyoming, and less common in the Hell Creek Formation of Montana.

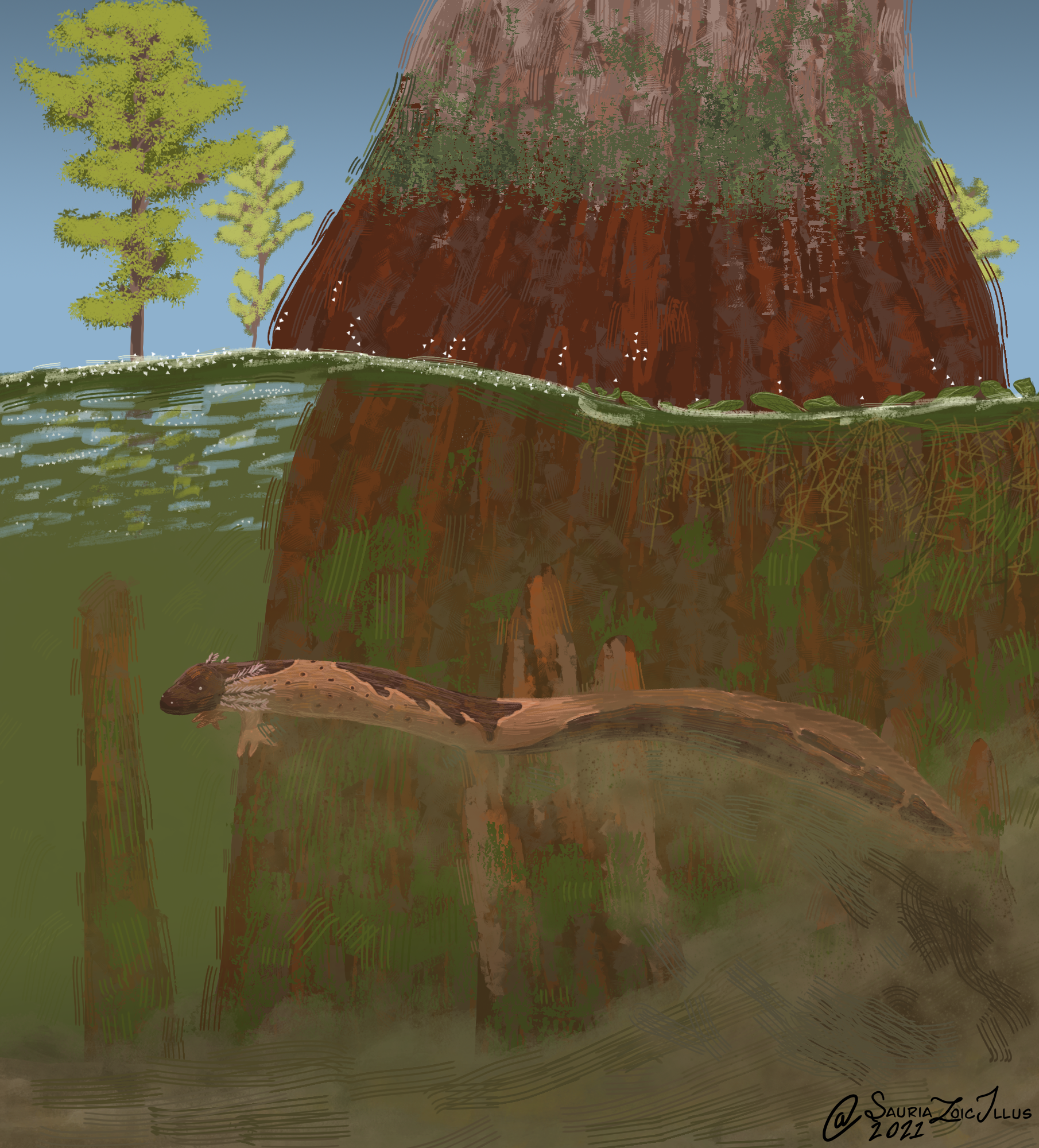
Artists reconstruction of Habrosaurus dilatus swimming by a cypress tree

== Description ==
Habrosaurus was a gigantic sirenid, its length is estimated to be around 1.6 m (5 ft 3 in), estimated from its trunk vertebrae length (up to 2 cm long). H. prodilatus possessed chisel-like teeth, while H. dilatus had bulkier crowns. The teeth of H. dilatus also exhibited heavy wear facets while those of H. prodilatus had only mild wear, suggesting that H. dilatus was more adapted for durophagy than H. prodilatus. H. dilatus may have preyed upon arthropods with hard carapaces as well as mollusks.

== Classification ==
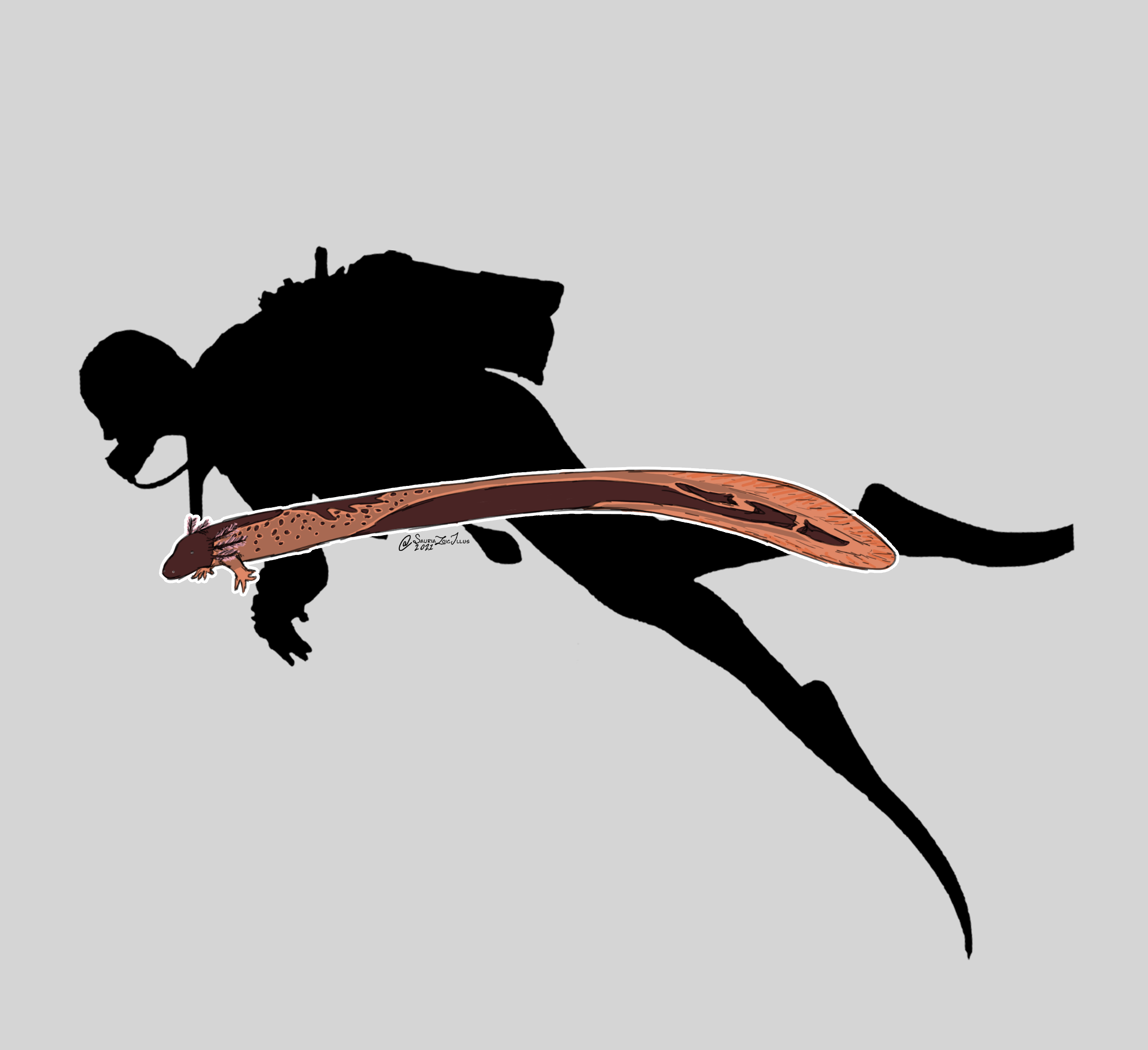
Size chart of Habrosaurus dilatus

Habrosaurus is a sister taxa to both Pseudobranchus and Siren which are the only genera in the family Sirenidae. Sirenids are classified by their neotenous traits (complete lack of hindlimbs and external gills in both larval and adult states).
