= David Steen =

David Steen may refer to:

- David Steen (photographer) (1936–2015), English photographer
- David Steen (actor) (born 1954), American actor and writer
- Dave Steen (decathlete) (born 1959), Canadian decathlete
- Dave Steen (shot putter) (born 1942), Canadian shot putter
- David A. Steen, American biologist
