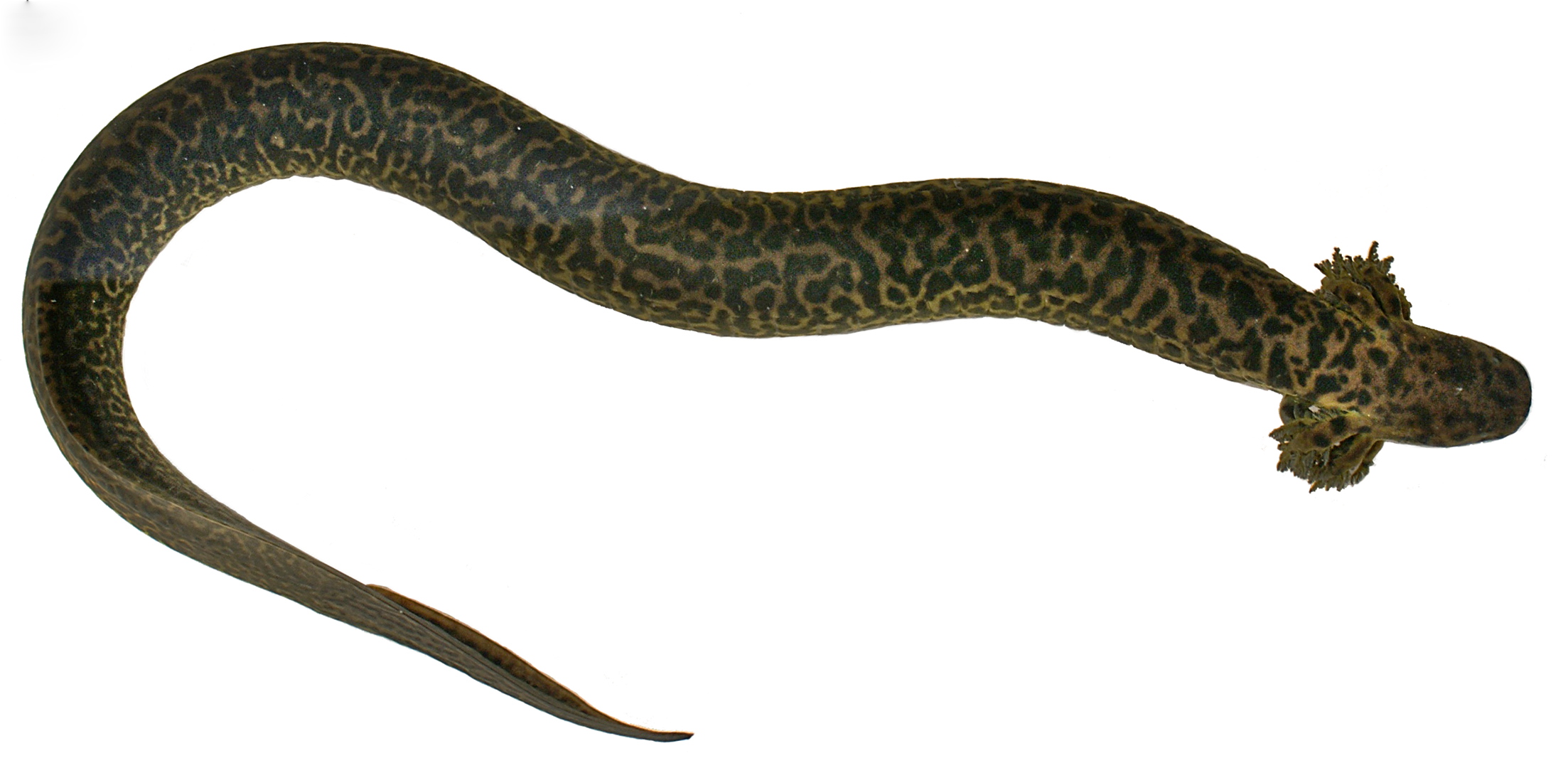

Conservation status
- Vulnerable (IUCN 3.1)

Scientific classification
- Kingdom: Animalia
- Phylum: Chordata
- Class: Amphibia
- Order: Urodela
- Family: Sirenidae
- Genus: Siren
- Species: S. reticulata

Binomial name
- Siren reticulata Graham, Kline, Steen & Kelehear, 2018
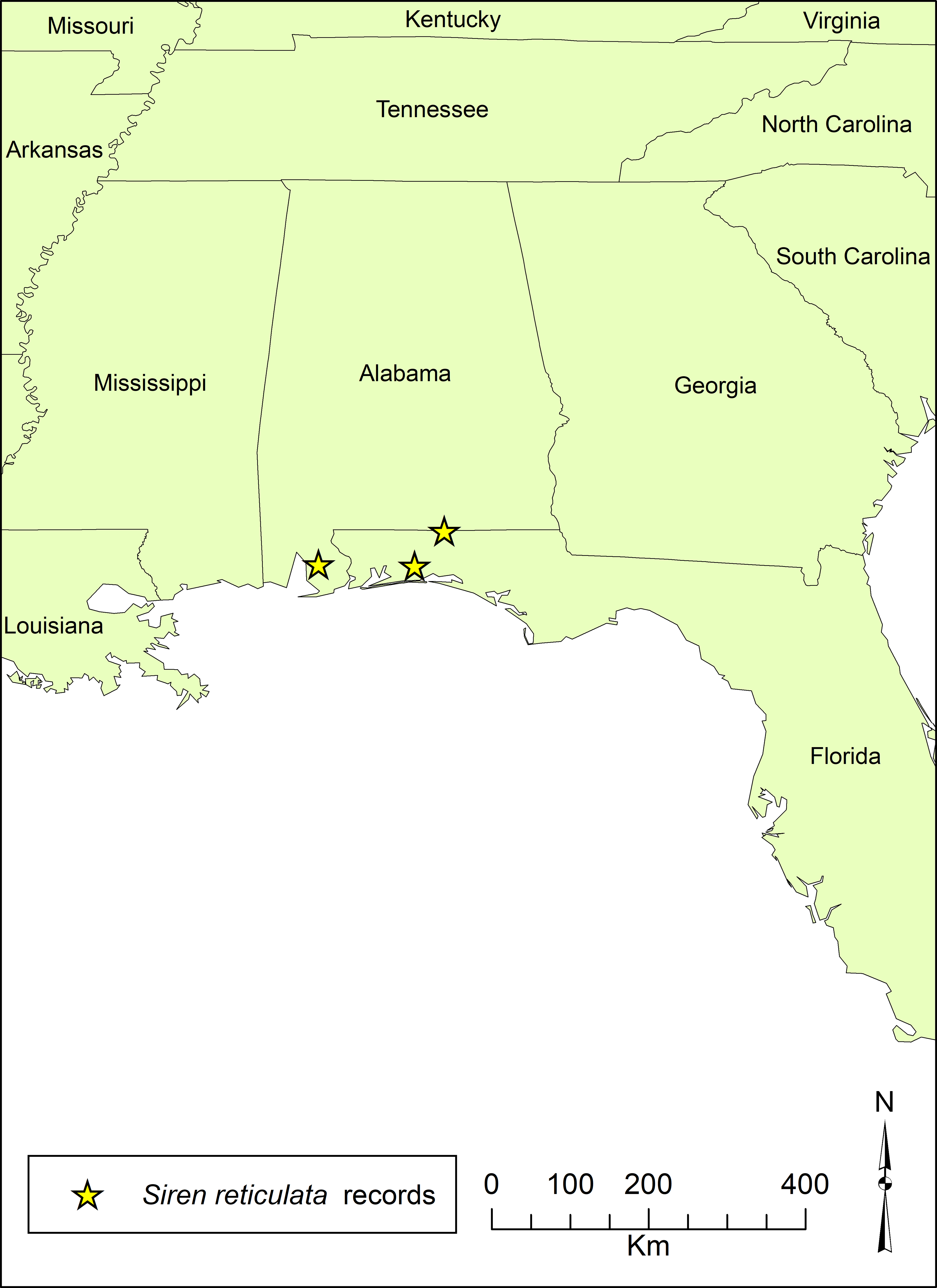

= Reticulated siren =

Species of amphibian

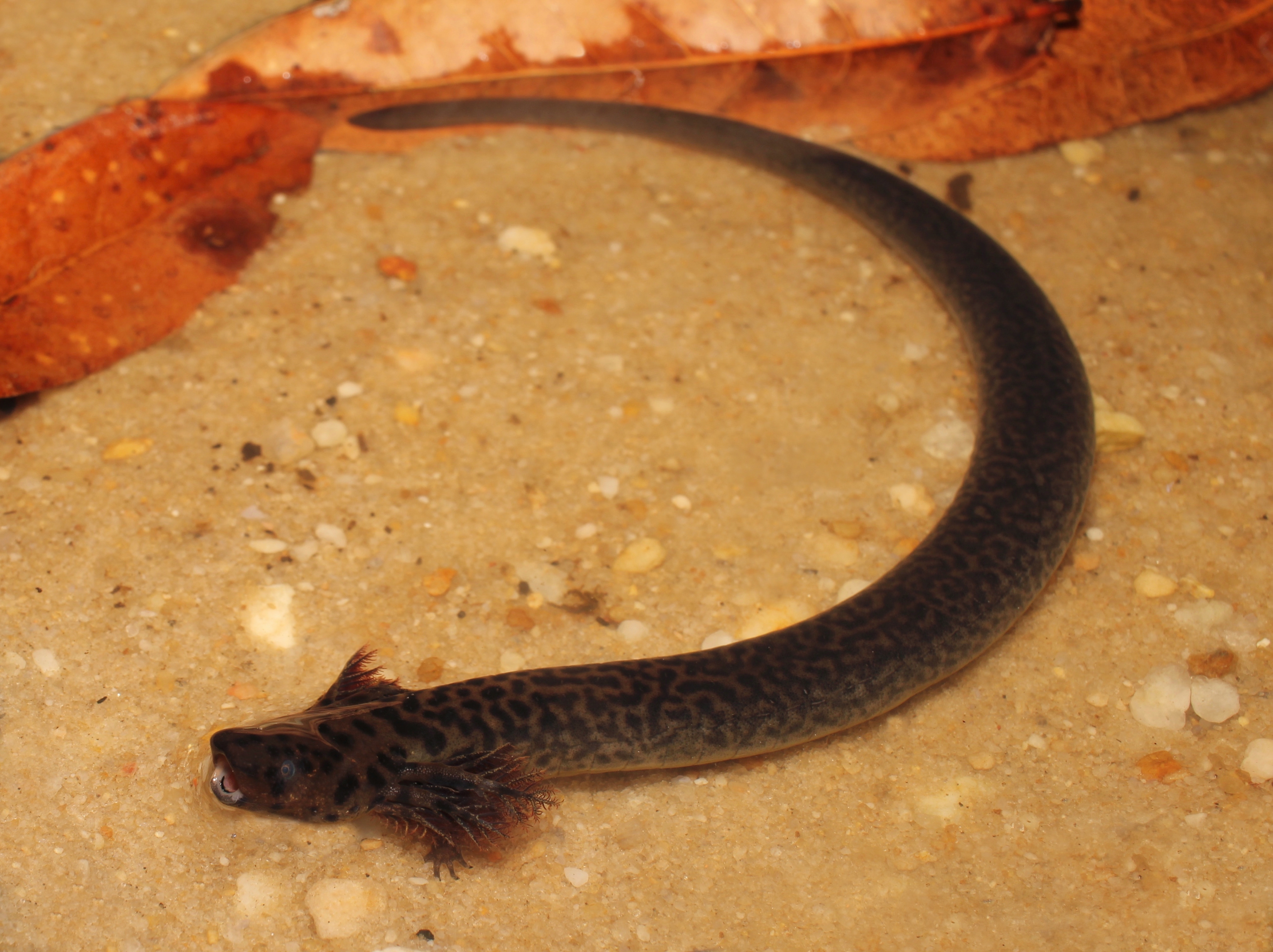
This salamander was found in a deep pool of mud.

The reticulated siren (Siren reticulata), also known as the leopard siren or colloquially as the leopard eel, is a species of aquatic salamander in the family Sirenidae. The species, which is endemic to the southeastern United States, was first formally described in 2018. This cryptic salamander is known only from three localities in southern Alabama and the Florida panhandle and is one of the largest animals in the United States to be newly described in the past 100 years.

== Description ==
The reticulated siren is one of the largest species of extant (living) salamanders worldwide, reaching up to 60 cm (2.0 ft) in total length, which rivals the hellbender of the Appalachian Mountains as both the largest amphibian in North America and the fourth largest salamander in the world. It has a greenish grey, eel-like body, large external gills, and two small front legs. The sides and belly are a lighter yellowish green. It has an average snout to vent length (SVL) of 33.4 cm (1.1 ft).

S. reticulata differs from other Siren species in its skin patterning: a patchwork of dark, leopard-like spots covering its back. It also has a relatively smaller head and a longer tail. Genetic analysis from mitochondrial and nuclear sequencing supported it as a separate species from S. intermedia and S. lacertina, and further suggested that additional species are yet to be discovered in this group.

== Biology ==
Almost nothing is known about the life history or ecology of S. reticulata.

== Habitat ==
The habitat of S. reticulata includes wetlands within the longleaf pine ecosystem. S. reticulata, along with other Siren species, exhibits habitat specialization. S. reticulata inhabits shallow, seepage habitats (seeps) that are not commonly used by other species of the genus. These habitats are typically nutrient-poor and host a variety of carnivorous plants such as drosera, pitcher plants, bladderworts, and pinguicula. These unique ecological niches contribute to the diversity of Siren species and their adaptations.

== Discovery ==
The first known reticulated siren was collected in 1970, in Baldwin County, Alabama, described by herpetologist Robert Hughes Mount as not conforming to the typical physical description of S. lacertina. It was not formally named at that time and was treated as somewhat of a legend, colloquially referred to as the "leopard eel". Another sighting of numerous individuals was made in the 1990s by the herpetologist John Jensen, who reportedly sighted dozens of reticulated sirens and amphiumas moving across a road during a rainstorm near Florala, Alabama.

In September 2009, American herpetologist David A. Steen was studying Nerodia (water snakes) and turtles at Eglin Air Force Base in Okaloosa County, Florida, when he captured a single specimen of S. reticulata in a crayfish trap. Additional trapping efforts between 2009 and 2014 were unsuccessful until three more sirens were found in June 2014 near Lake Jackson in Walton County, Florida. The reticulated siren is one of the largest animals in the United States to be newly described in the past 100 years.

== Taxonomy ==
The leopard eel was formally described as Siren reticulata in December 2018. The specific epithet reticulata refers to the reticulated (meaning network-like or patchwork) patterning typical of this species. The authors of the 2018 paper coined the name reticulated siren as a "more appropriate formal common name", as it is neither a leopard nor an eel. It is one of four extant species in the genus Siren.

The holotype is a female captured in Walton County, Florida, measuring 39.7 cm (1.3 ft) from snout to vent and weighing 221 g (0.5 lb). The type locality habitat was a shallow marsh vegetated with floating and emergent plants.
