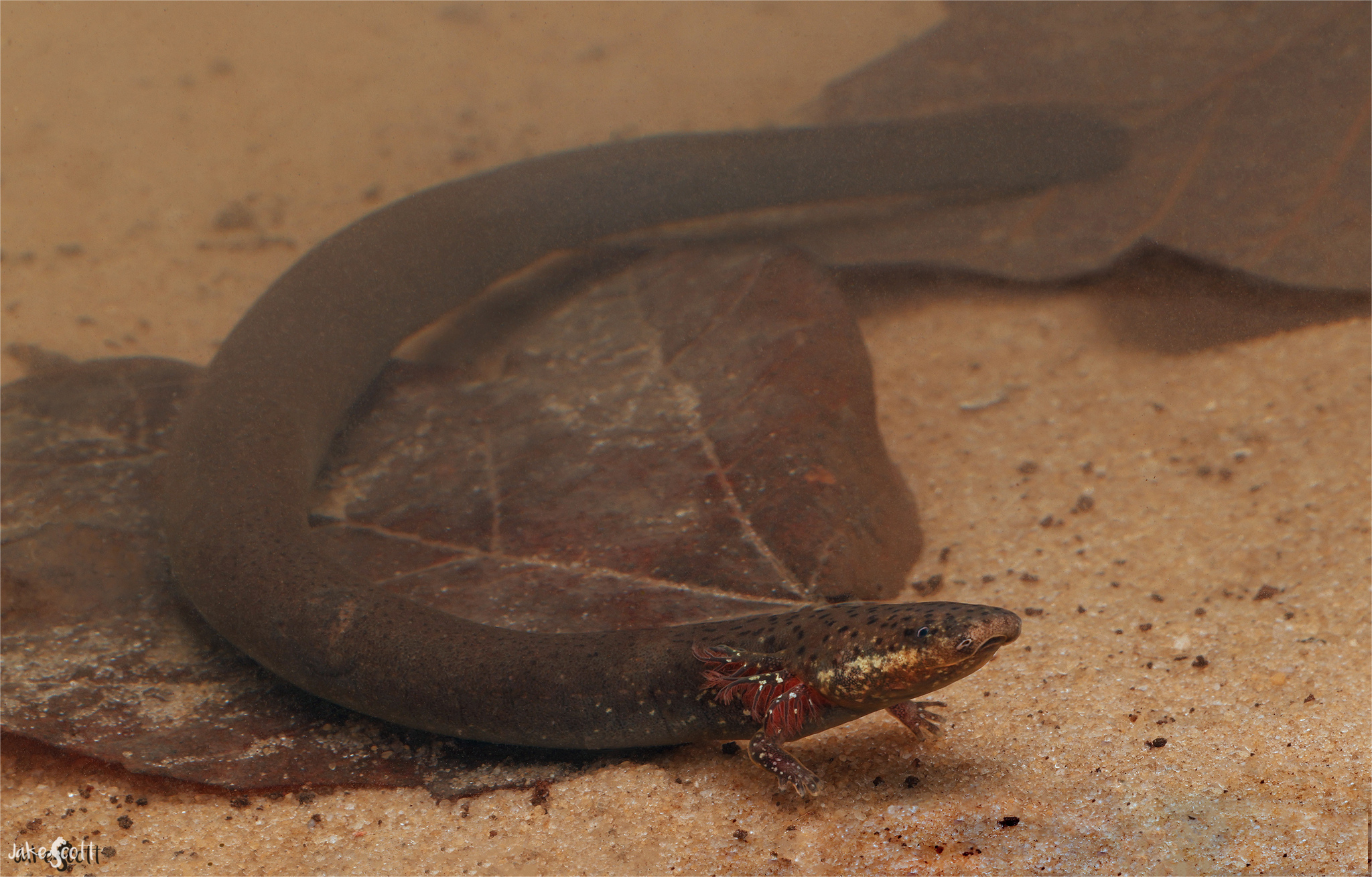

Conservation status
- Least Concern (IUCN 3.1)

Scientific classification
- Kingdom: Animalia
- Phylum: Chordata
- Class: Amphibia
- Order: Urodela
- Family: Sirenidae
- Genus: Siren
- Species: S. intermedia

Binomial name
- Siren intermedia Barnes, 1826

= Lesser siren =

Species of amphibian

The lesser siren (Siren intermedia) is a species of aquatic salamander native to the eastern United States and northern Mexico. They are referred to by numerous common names, including two-legged eel, dwarf siren, and mud eel. The specific epithet intermedia denotes their intermediate size, between the greater siren, Siren lacertina, and the dwarf sirens, Pseudobranchus species.

== Description ==
Lesser sirens have elongated bodies possessing only two limbs, a pair of four-toed legs located behind the base of the head, and range in length from 7 to 27 inches (Note: or 6–15 inches.) (17 – 69 cm). Unlike greater sirens, lesser sirens have less than 35 costal grooves. Juvenile specimens have red to yellow banding on their heads and stripes running along the main length of the body, although these stripes are absent in Siren intermedia. Adults have plainer coloration; the dorsal side is typically olive green to blue-gray or black, while the ventral is usually light grey. Spotted patterns may also be present in adults. In salamanders, sexual size dimorphism is usually female-biased, but in Siren intermedia, it is the opposite. Males are the larger sex, and they also have significantly larger heads and enlarged masseter muscles than females.

Lesser sirens are notably neotenic, and possess external gills throughout their lives.

== Taxonomy ==
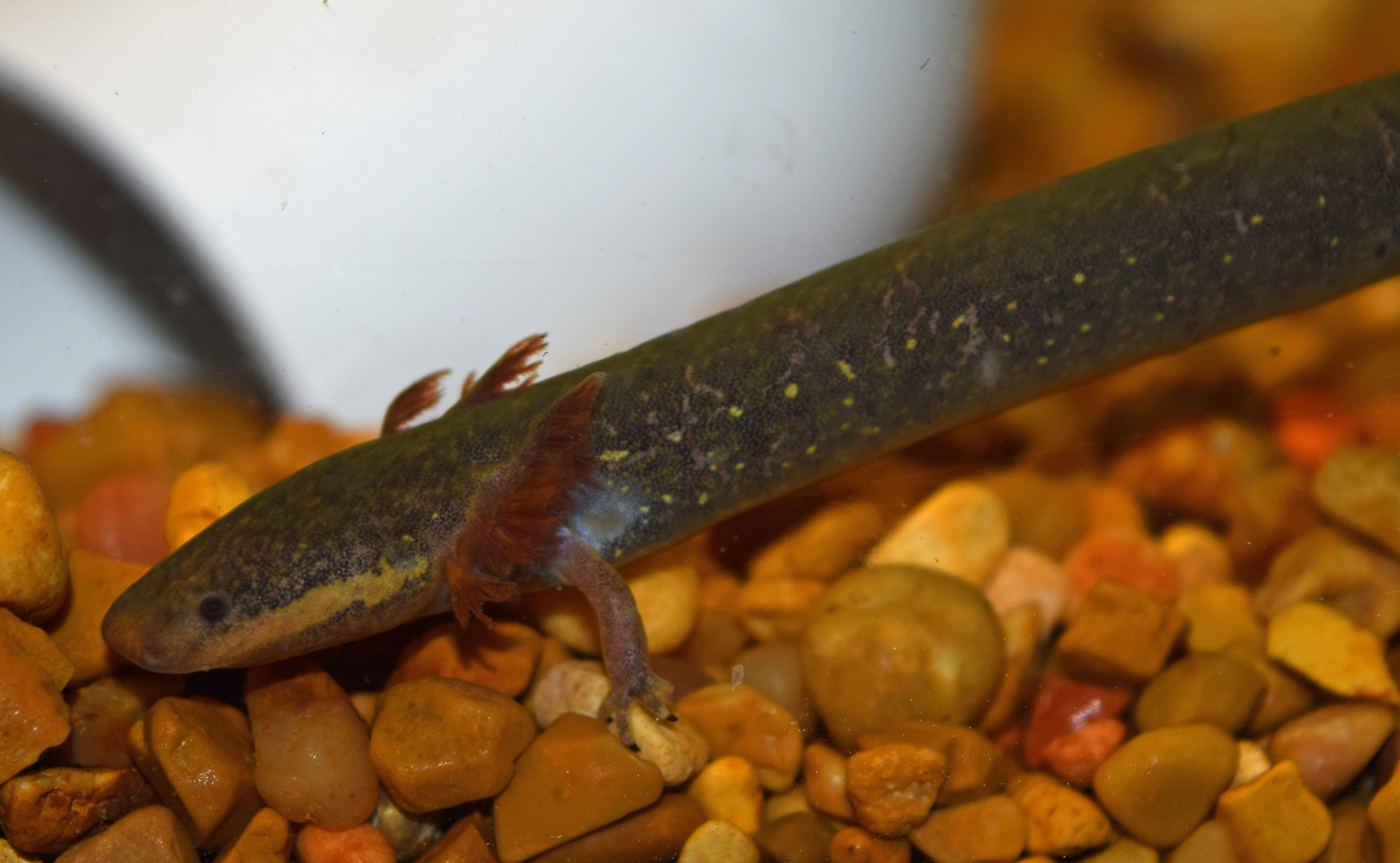
Siren intermedia nettingi, the western lesser siren

Sources disagree on the number of subspecies within S. intermedia. The majority of the sources in the field agree there are at least two: an eastern and a western variety. Many sources also include a third subspecies, the Rio Grande lesser siren, S. i. texana, but researchers disagree whether the Rio Grande variety belongs as a lesser siren, within S. intermedia, or as a greater siren, within S. lacertina, and some others even consider it to be its own species, as S. texana.

- Eastern lesser siren, S. i. intermedia Barnes, 1826
- Western lesser siren, S. i. nettingi Goin, 1942
- Rio Grande lesser siren, S. i. texana Goin, 1957

== Habitat and distribution ==
=== Habitat ===
Sirens are likely to be found in ponds near other intermittent wetlands. They usually inhabit swamps and ponds, and can survive in dry ponds for up to two years by aestivating. Sirens are considered poor overland dispersers because they rarely leave the water, so their geographical distribution is largely determined by pond connectivity and biotic interactions.

Lesser sirens are aquatic salamanders, but their ability to withstand factors like dehydration allows them to have good survival skills in their ephemeral habitats. Sirens are able to osmoregulate and produce a mucoid cocoon during aestivation, which greatly reduces dehydration and electrolyte stress. Their small legs enable them to move on dry land for short periods of time.

=== Geographic distribution ===
The lesser siren is found in the United States and Mexico, primarily from Virginia to Florida, west to Texas, ranging into northeastern Mexico as far as Veracruz, and north to Illinois and southwest Michigan. Multiple specimens have recently been rediscovered in Michigan after a 60-year absence. Lesser sirens only occur in permanent wetlands, whereas other salamander and frog species can occupy a range of dry and wetlands. Lesser sirens are top predators in permanent wetlands. They can quickly colonize and become dominant consumers in new ponds such as those constructed by beavers. Their ability to aestivate and burrow in soft sediments and live in dense aquatic vegetation in shallow waters facilitates their dominance. In addition, the species' high productivity, high fecundity, and rapid growth to early sexual maturity allows it reach a high density quickly and easily, and thus establish dominance in the habitat.

== Conservation ==
The lesser siren is quite common through most of its range, but rarely seen due to its secretive nature. Like almost all species of amphibian, their numbers are believed to be declining due to general reductions in water quality caused by agricultural pesticide and fertilizer runoff. They are frequently collected and used as bait for fishing.

The species was once believed to be extirpated from Michigan, but has been recently rediscovered in limited numbers. The S. i. texana subspecies is listed as a threatened species in Texas. They are listed as Least concern on the IUCN Red List and a species with "Special Protection" in Mexico.

== Physiology ==
=== Vision ===
Western Lesser Sirens (Siren intermedia nettingi) have poor eyesight. They rely on their other senses to forage, hunt, and survive.

=== Chemical sense ===
Sirens rely on chemical cues to detect prey and not on visual cues. The use of chemical stimuli in the detection of prey and predators are common in amphibians.

=== Respiration ===
All species in the sirenidae family are paedomorphic, eel-shaped salamanders that live in aquatic environments. They respire through their gills, lungs and skin, and survive well in hypoxic environments low in oxygen. Siren intermedia is unique among amphibians in its ability to construct a mucoid cocoon that slows down dehydration during aestivation, and the lesser siren can withstand long periods of food deprivation without ill effects. During aestivation, respiration slows down significantly, and gills atrophy over the next 16 or more weeks.

=== Acoustic behavior ===
The lesser siren is vocal, unlike most salamanders. The lesser siren is known to emit a series of clicks when it approaches others of its species, or a short screeching sound if handled. Acoustic behavior serves a functional service in S. intermedia, especially since it is nocturnal and it burrows in sediments, swims and crawls through densely vegetated waters. However, its visual and olfactory senses are very limited in this habitat, and thus the possibility of predation and other risks are high in this case. Nevertheless, acoustic behavior in lesser sirens is still infrequent, and becomes even less frequent with undisturbed habitat residency, perhaps because of their familiarity with the environment.

Siren intermedia make and responds to underwater sounds that may have specific communicational significance. Resting sirens are usually silent, but they may produce trains of pulsed sounds or "clicks". Their tendency to click is greater in groups than in single specimens, which suggests that they are involved in intraspecific communication. These acoustic behaviors occur most often when other sirens are present. They are emitted at different pulse rates by specimens clicking simultaneously, and are associated with head-jerking motions. Head-jerking may offer visual reinforcement of an acoustically defended individual space, or it may be required for sound production. S. intermedia can produce clicks by moving the horny jaw coverings together rapidly, and head-jerking may be associated with such movement when it is particularly forceful. This means of sound production is similar to the upper and lower teeth of humans, clicking with the mouth open.

Another frequently produced sound ("yelp") is associated with cases of distress, or alarm. When S. intermedia butt or bite each other in their habitat, the bitten or injured individuals may swim away quickly, emitting yelps at frequencies of 880 Hz. These yelp sounds could have communicational significance if they prevent further attack or signal to other individuals that one is injured.

=== Osmoregulation ===
Animals that inhabit freshwater habitats have high-affinity sodium uptake systems. Therefore, the better an animal is adapted to freshwater, the lower the rate of sodium loss and uptake. Sirens have a high sodium affinity (around 0.2 peq/g per day), and thus are able to resist the harmful effects of low-sodium environments.

=== Hormones ===
Insulin has been isolated from the pancreas of lesser sirens that is mostly conserved in sequence as compared to other amphibian orders. However, it does have some substitution differences that indicate that sirens diverged early from other salamanders.

== Diet ==
Lesser sirens are filter feeders. They sift through pond bottoms and aquatic vegetation for prey items. They have heavily keratinized beaks and vomerine dental arrays that can inflict substantial wounds. The diet of the lesser siren includes at least 10 different taxa, which includes primarily aquatic invertebrates, including tadpoles and snails. They also eat several insects and their larvae, crayfish, mollusks, amphibians, siren eggs, and algae, although the plant material may be an incidental result of their gape-and-suck feeding style.

== Reproduction and life cycle ==
=== Annual seasonal behavior changes ===
The lesser siren is nocturnal, spending its days hidden in the debris and mud at the bottom of slow-moving bodies of water. Sirens are most active in the fall and spring seasons, when water temperatures are close to 15 °C and there is no danger of drought. During the summer months, the ponds and other habitats that the lesser siren live in go through periods of drought, which leads to low water levels and possibly dried-up ponds. The lesser siren's strategy to withstand the rigors of these dry seasons is something called "aestivation", or summer dormancy, which can last up to 35 weeks, depending on the severity of the drought. During the sixteen-week period from July to October, aquatic lesser sirens increase the osmotic concentration of their body fluids, and slow down bodily functions.

They do this by burrowing themselves into the bottom of its drying pond in tube-like channels about the length and width of their bodies. For the rest of the aestivating process, they then secrete a mucous cocoon. That is then followed by a significant drop in their oxygen consumption and heart rate. The gills slowly atrophy and the body shrinks, and as a result the fat is metabolized at one-fifth the normal rate. As expected, large individuals store more fat and consume less oxygen per unit weight than small ones, and thus can survive much longer periods of aestivation. Some individuals, especially the smaller sirens during aestivation, die or suffer from dehydration as they are unable to store sufficient fat and the greater metabolic demand reduces their chance of survival.

As the drought season comes to an end, lesser sirens become active within a day, and slowly regain the lost weight over the next 8–11 weeks.

== Mating ==
=== Mate choice ===
From November to January, males occupy a shelter as a nest site usually surrounded by vegetation or among plant roots, and actively equip it with moss from the surrounding nest site, plucking plant material and dragging it back to the nest site. They then defend their territory aggressively against others through biting.

=== Courting ===
Though little is known about their courtship, it is believed to be quite violent, as many specimens collected have scarring from healed bite marks from other sirens. About 12–300 eggs are laid at a time, and several clutches may be laid over the course of the year. Hatchlings are only about 0.4 in (1.1 cm) in length, but grow quickly. Maturity is typically reached in approximately three to four years. Courtship includes several repeating behavioral patterns. Once the female approaches the nest site, the male and female start moving within the area, coiling around each other. The male pursues the female's cloaca closely, sometimes rubbing his head against the flank and the cloacal region of the female. Both the male and the female wave their tail fins by undulating the tail tip.

== Parental care ==
=== Oviposition ===
During oviposition, the female turns on its back, positions the cloaca near the top of the nest cavity and halts for several seconds. Then the male positions his cloaca near the site of oviposition. Eggs are directly coiled into the moss that the male has prepared in the nest. Interlacing of the eggs into the plant material in the nest ensures that the eggs adhere to the nest as a compact mass, and facilitates external fertilization.

=== Egg guarding ===
In S. intermedia, parental care is fulfilled by the males. Paternal care as observed in the lesser siren is very rare for salamanders. After the female completes oviposition and leaves the nest, the male stays in close proximity to the eggs and takes the responsibility of parental care. The total number of eggs can be around 120–130, with a diameter of about 3 mm. The male constantly moves the egg mass, circles around it, and aerates the eggs through vigorous tail fanning. The tail-fanning behavior of the male towards the eggs can enhance sperm dispersal. Additionally, the male continuously cleans the nest from sand and other materials, to improve hygienic conditions and possibly to prevent infections from pathogens and fungi. It is also likely that males remove dead or infected eggs, in order to prevent further infection of the viable eggs.

The development of the larvae takes approximately 35 days. Paternal care does not end there however, it continues after the larvae hatch and the male continues to aggressively defend the larvae up to one week after hatching.

== Mutualisms ==
Siren intermedia has many important effects on community structure as it is one of the most important predators in temporary ponds, where it complements the keystone predator role of eastern newts (Notophthalmus viridescens). S. intermedia reduces the total densities of the anuran larvae, and by doing that, it allows the eastern newts to act as keystone predators over a broad range of prey densities.

== Enemies ==
Adult mole salamanders (Ambystoma talpoideum) and lesser sirens (Siren intermedia), are the top two predators in temporary ponds of the southeastern United States. Siren intermedia competes with and is an intraguild predator of A. talpoideum, limiting its growth and controlling its recruitment.

== Sources ==
- Martof, Bernard S.; Palmer, William M.; Bailey, Joseph R.; Harrison III, Julian R. (1980). Amphibians and Reptiles of the Carolinas and Virginia. The University of North Carolina Press. p. 45. ISBN 0-8078-4252-4.
