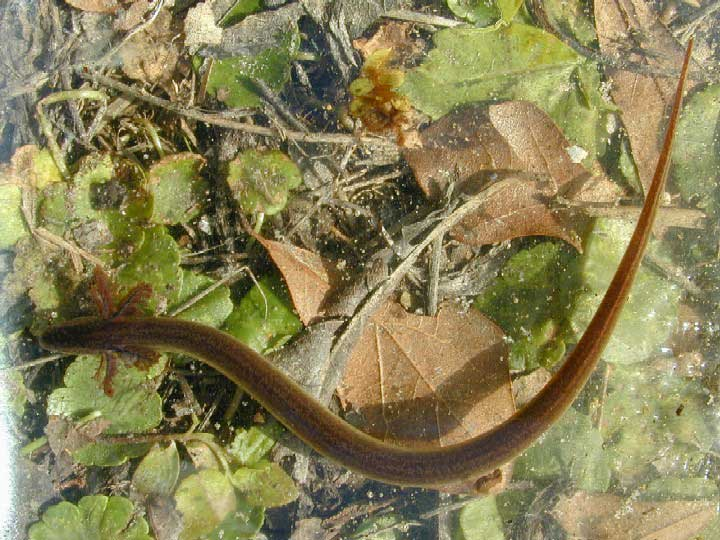

Conservation status
- Least Concern (IUCN 3.1)

- Apparently Secure (NatureServe)

Scientific classification
- Kingdom: Animalia
- Phylum: Chordata
- Class: Amphibia
- Order: Urodela
- Family: Sirenidae
- Genus: Pseudobranchus
- Species: P. axanthus

Binomial name
- Pseudobranchus axanthus Netting & Goin, 1942
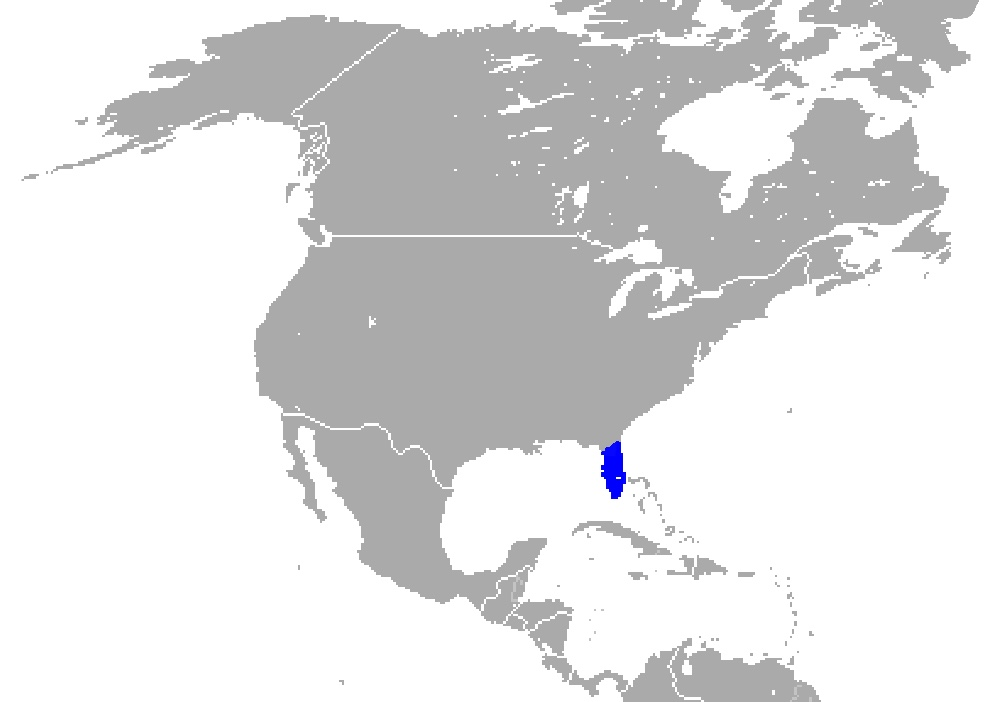

= Southern dwarf siren =

Species of amphibian

The southern dwarf siren, (Pseudobranchus axanthus) is a perennibranch salamander lacking hind legs. Found exclusively in Florida, it is one of two currently recognized species of dwarf sirens. Two subspecies are currently recognized; P. a. axanthus, the narrow-striped dwarf siren, and P. a. belli, the Everglades dwarf siren.

== Physical description ==
Southern dwarf sirens are thin, slimy salamanders that are frequently mistaken for eels. They have long bodies with bushy gills and small, three-toed fore legs. Coloration is generally brown, black, or gray, with yellow or tan stripes on their backs and sides. Adults reach a length of 10 centimetres (3.9 in) to 25 centimetres (9.8 in).

Southern dwarf sirens can easily be distinguished from amphiumas by size and the presence of hind legs, and from Siren spp. salamanders by the presence of three toes on each foot. Distinguishing between P. axanthus and P. striatus is more difficult, requiring comparison of patterns with a field guide, known distribution, or a karyotype test. P. axanthus has 32 chromosomes, while P. striatus has 24. A costal groove count may assist in differentiating P. a. axanthus and P. a. belli, as the former has 34–37 costal grooves, while the latter has 29–33 (Petranka, 1998).

== Distribution ==
P. axanthus is found throughout eastern Florida, with P. a. axanthus located in the northern two-thirds of the range and P. a. belli located in the southern third. P. axanthus prefers cypress ponds, ditches, swamps and marshes, and other aquatic and semiaquatic habitats. P. axanthus is frequently associated with water hyacinth.

== Reproduction ==
Little is known about the reproduction of wild sirenid salamanders. Eggs of P. axanthus have been found from November through March, and are usually attached singly to aquatic plants. Eggs average 3 mm in diameter and have three jelly envelopes.

In captivity, eggs were attached singly at night to floating vegetation in groups of two to five a day. Larvae hatch out at about 5 mm after around three weeks.

== Diet ==
Southern dwarf sirens eat a variety of food items, including small worms, chironomids, amphipods, and ostracods. Dwarf sirens have surprisingly small mouths, but will likely eat any invertebrate they can swallow. In captivity, adult Daphnia magna, whiteworms, blackworms, and tubifex worms are readily taken.

== Ecology ==
During dry spells, P. axanthus is known to aestivate in muddy burrows, and adults have been kept for periods longer than two months in dry soil with no ill effects in the laboratory.
