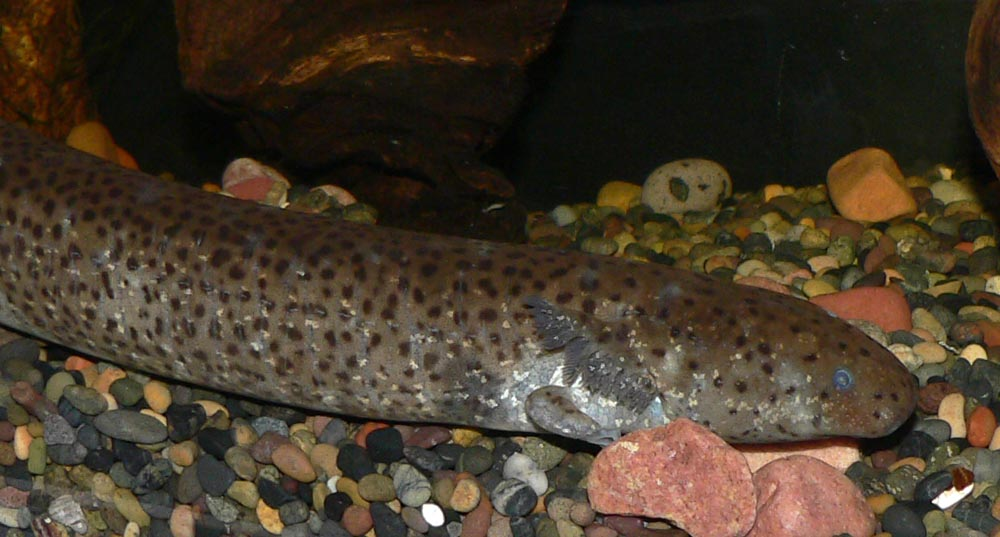
- Lesser siren, Siren intermedia

Scientific classification
- Kingdom: Animalia
- Phylum: Chordata
- Class: Amphibia
- Order: Urodela
- Family: Sirenidae
- Genus: Siren; Linnaeus, 1766 (Note: Sometimes listed as Siren Österdam, 1766, but Linnaeus has been ceded formal authorship by ICZN Opinion 92 in 1926 and Direction 57 in 1956.)

Type species
- Siren lacertina Linnaeus, 1766

= Siren (genus) =

Siren Temporal range: Eocene–present

Genus of salamanders

Siren is a genus of aquatic salamanders of the family Sirenidae. The genus consists of five extant species, along with one extinct species from the Eocene Epoch and three from the Miocene.

The living species have elongated, eel-like bodies, with two small vestigial fore legs.

Siren intermedia, the lesser siren, has been seen as both a colonizer and a dominant species, in a single community, at two different succession stages. In Texas, during the 1970s, the species was found to have removed at least 283 individuals from a beaver pond, over a four year period.

== Species ==
Extant (living) species include:

- Siren intermedia Barnes, 1826 – lesser siren
- Siren lacertina Linnaeus, 1766 – greater siren
- Siren nettingi Goin, 1942 – western siren
- Siren reticulata Graham, Kline, Steen & Kelehear, 2018 – reticulated siren or leopard eel
- Siren sphagnicola Fedler, Enge & Moler, 2023 – seepage siren

Extinct species:

- †Siren dunni Goin & Auffenberg, 1957
- †Siren hesterna Goin & Auffenberg, 1955
- †Siren miotexana Holman, 1977
- †Siren simpsoni Goin & Auffenberg, 1955
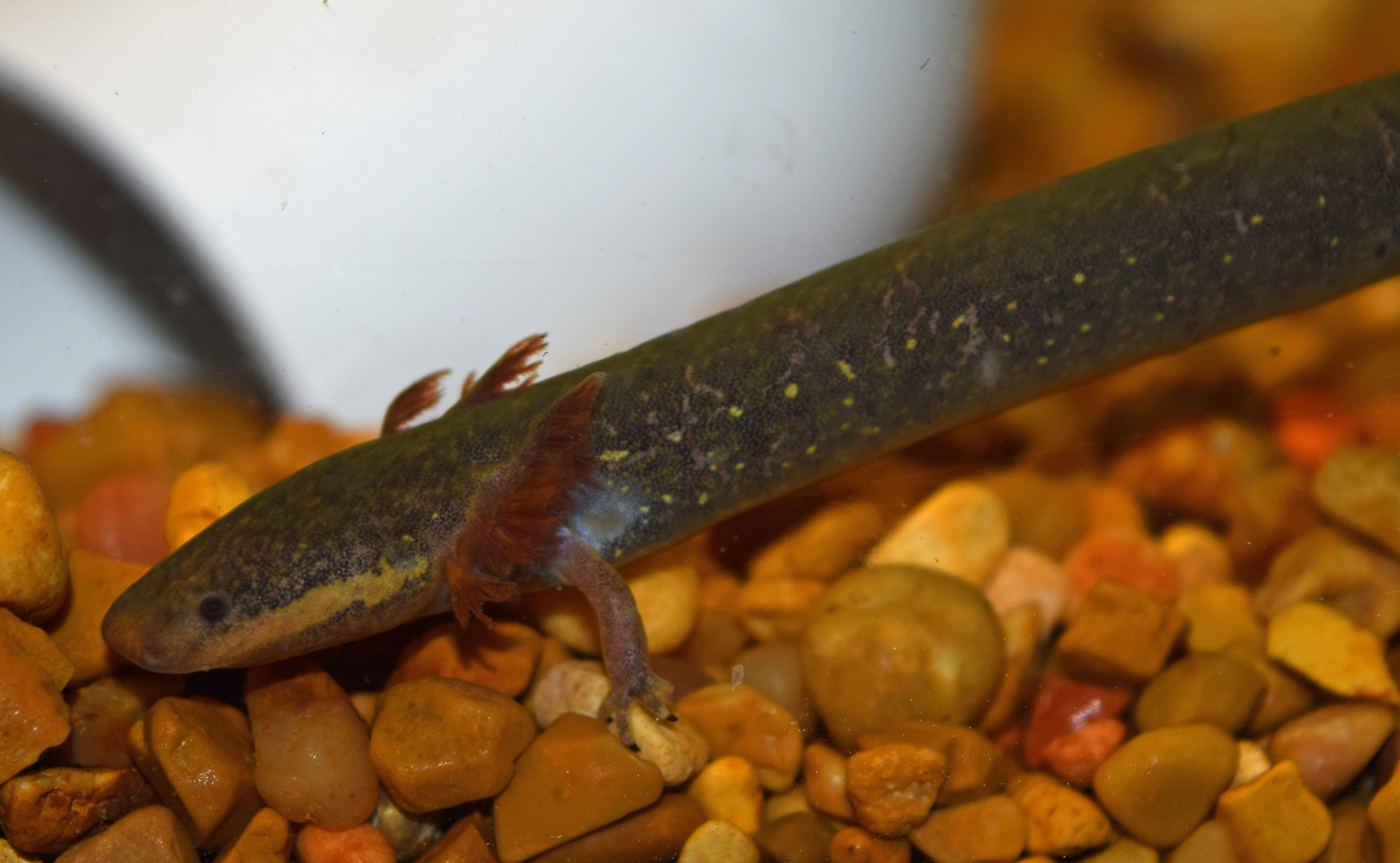
Siren intermedia nettingi,
western lesser siren

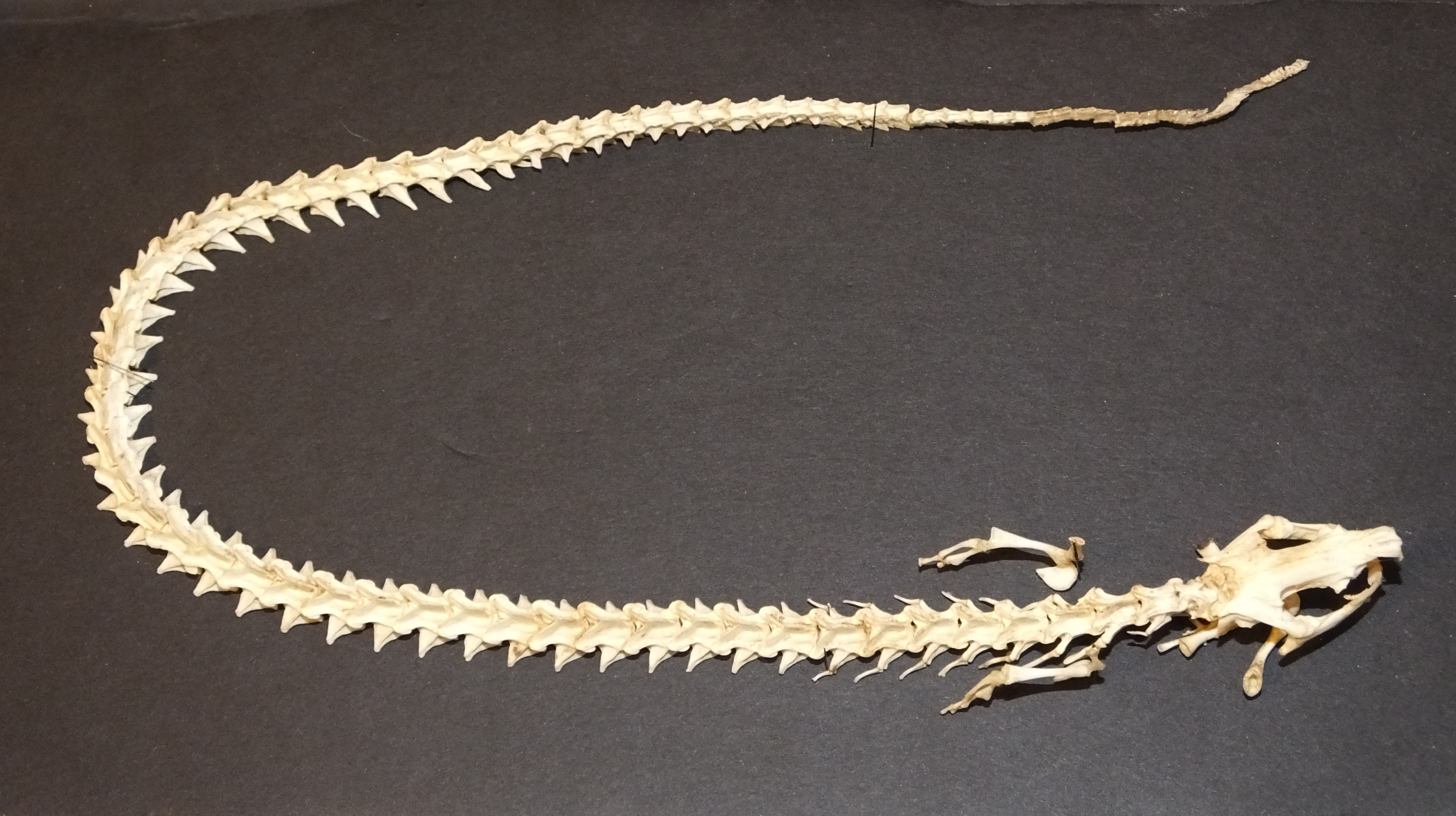
Siren lacertina,
greater siren,
skeleton

== See also ==
- Pseudobranchus, dwarf sirens
