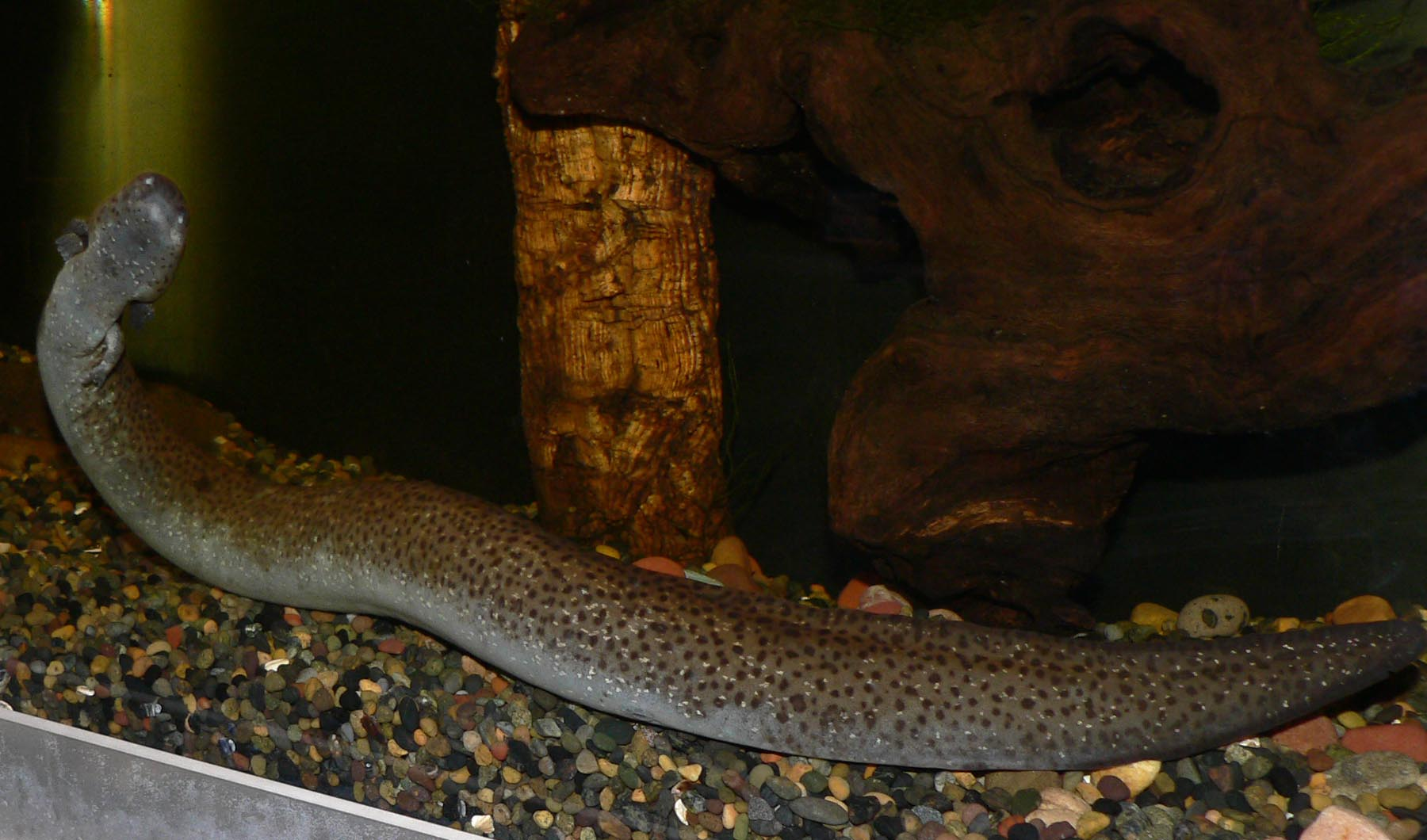
- Siren intermedia

Scientific classification
- Kingdom: Animalia
- Phylum: Chordata
- Class: Amphibia
- Order: Urodela
- Family: Sirenidae; Gray, 1825

Genera
- †Habrosaurus; Pseudobranchus; Siren

= Sirenidae =

Sirenidae Temporal range: Late Cretaceous - Present, 95–0 Ma

Family of amphibians

Sirenidae, the sirens, are a family of neotenic aquatic salamanders. Family members have very small fore limbs, and lack hind limbs altogether. In one species, the skeleton in their fore limbs is made of only cartilage. In contrast to most other salamanders, they have external gills bunched together on the neck in both larval and adult states. Sirens are found only in the Southeastern United States and northern Mexico.

Although they are primarily carnivorous, they are the only salamanders observed eating plant material.

== Description ==
Sirens are quite distinct from other salamanders, and in some classifications they form their own suborder, Sirenoidea, or as a completely distinct order (Meantes or Trachystomata). Genetic analysis variously places them as the sister to other Salamandroidea or as sister to all other salamanders. Many of their unique characteristics seem to be partly primitive and partly derivative.

Sirens are generally eel-like in form, with two tiny, but otherwise fully developed, fore limbs. They range from 25–95 cm (9.8–37.4 in) in length. They are neotenic, although the larval gills are small and functionless at first, and only adults have fully developed (but inefficient) gills. They are obligate air-breathers with well developed lungs, proving they likely evolved from a terrestrial ancestor with an aquatic larval stage. Like amphiumas, they are able to cross land on rainy nights.

These amphibians are omnivorous, feeding mainly on worms, small snails, shrimps, and filamentous algae. They are notable among salamanders (and most amphibians, aside from a few frog species) due to their semi-herbivorous habits. Their jaws possess sharp-edged keratinised and toothless ridges, like many anuran tadpoles, but the coronoid bone in the lower jaw and the vomer and palatine bone in the upper jaw have patches of monocuspid and unbladed teeth arranged in polystichous patterns.

If the conditions of a water source are unsuitable, a larva will shrink its gills to mere stumps, and these may not function at all. They are also able to burrow into mud of drying ponds and encase themselves with a cocoon of mucus to survive periods of drought. During such periods, they breathe with their small but functional lungs.

Unlike other salamanders, an interventricular septum is present in the heart. At least two of the species can produce vocalizations.

The structure of sirens' reproductive systems suggests they employ external fertilization. This has finally been confirmed in captive breeding experiments, showcasing that males also engage in parental care, building nests for their offspring. Parental care among sirens is paternal due to external fertilization. In S. intermedia males circle around females and may rub or bite her flank region. Both male and female will go on their backs and turn. It is assumed here where the female spawns and the male fertilizes her eggs. After the courtship is over, the female leaves and the male guards the eggs. Males could potentially guard more than one brood, but they are known to bite females who enter a nesting site. Paternal care has also been observed in Cryptobranchoidea, the other suborder with external fertilization. This is critical to phylogeny, as Salamandroidea, the third suborder, use internal fertilization which may be pair with maternal care, meaning that sirens are one of the oldest groups of salamanders.

The combined biomass of Siren intermedia species in a Texas pond exceeded the total biomass of the pond's seven species of fish.

== Taxonomy ==
The siren family (Sirenidae) is subdivided into five genera, three extinct, and two extant with two and three extant species, respectively:

- Genus †Habrosaurus Gilmore 1928
  - †H. dilatus Gilmore 1928
  - †H. prodilatus Gardner 2003
- Genus †Kababisha Evans et al. 1996
  - †K. humarensis Evans et al. 1996
  - †K. sudanensis Evans et al. 1996
- Genus †Noterpeton Rage et al. 1993
  - †Noterpeton bolivianum Rage et al. 1993
- Genus Pseudobranchus Gray 1825 dwarf sirens
  - †P. robustus Goin and Auffenberg 1955
  - †P. vetustus
  - P. axanthus Netting & Goin 1942 southern dwarf siren
  - P. striatus LeConte 1824 northern dwarf siren
- Genus Siren Österdam 1766 sirens
  - †S. dunni Goin and Auffenberg 1957
  - †S. hesterna
  - †S. miotexana
  - †S. simpsoni
  - S. intermedia Barnes 1826 lesser siren
  - S. lacertina Linnaeus, 1766 greater siren
  - S. nettingi Goin, 1942 western siren
  - S. reticulata Graham, Kline, Steen & Kelehear, 2018 reticulated siren
  - S. sphagnicola Fedler, Enge, & Moler, 2023 seepage siren
