= David A. Steen =

American conservation biologist

- Education: University of New Hampshire (B.S), SUNY ESF (M.S.), Auburn University (Ph.D.)
- Scientific career
- Fields: Herpetology, ecology, conservation, science communication
- Workplaces: The Alongside Wildlife Foundation, Georgia Sea Turtle Center

David A. Steen is an American herpetologist and conservation biologist. He is Reptile and Amphibian Research Leader of the Fish and Wildlife Research Institute (Florida Fish and Wildlife Conservation Commission), and was previously a research professor at Auburn University, where he completed his Ph.D. Steen runs a popular Twitter account where he offers reptile and amphibian identification and dispels myths about oft-maligned snakes such as copperheads, cottonmouths, and rattlesnakes.

He won the Mindlin Foundation's "Mindlin Science Communication Prize" in 2017 for his efforts in online science communication. He is author of the book Secrets of Snakes: the Science Beyond the Myths.

In 2018, along with researchers Sean P. Graham, Richard Kline, and Crystal Kelehear, he described a new species of aquatic salamander endemic to the Gulf Coastal Plain, Siren reticulata, known as the reticulated siren or leopard eel.
