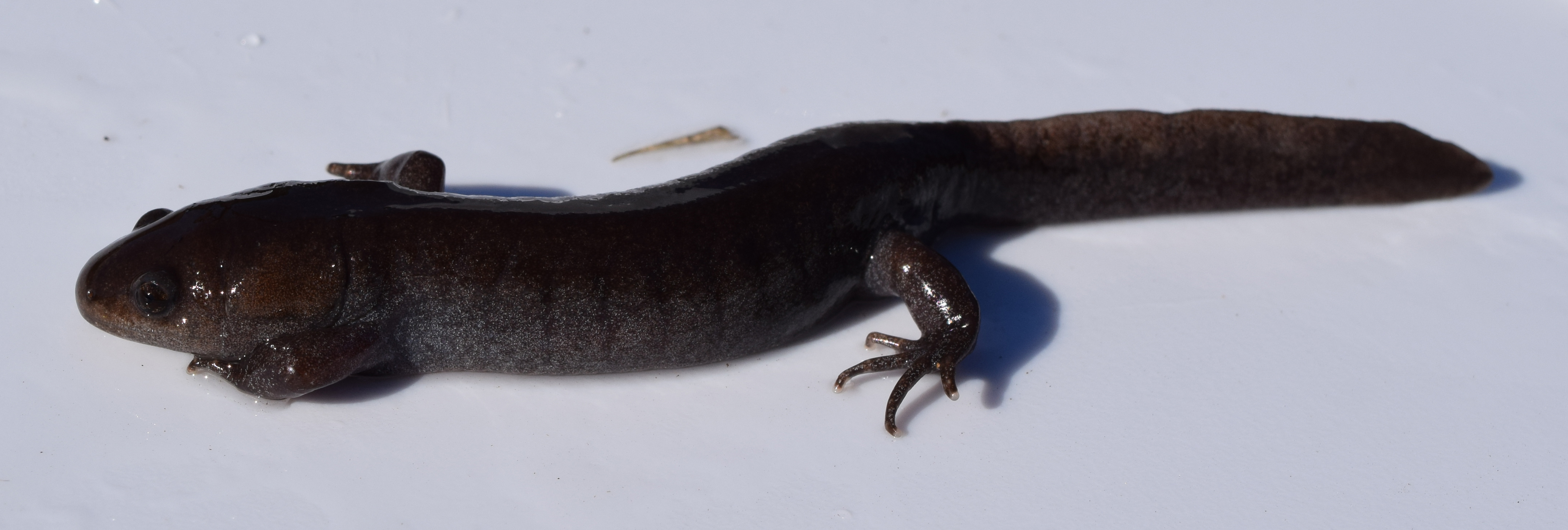

Conservation status
- Least Concern (IUCN 3.1)

Scientific classification
- Kingdom: Animalia
- Phylum: Chordata
- Class: Amphibia
- Order: Urodela
- Family: Ambystomatidae
- Genus: Ambystoma
- Species: A. talpoideum

Binomial name
- Ambystoma talpoideum Holbrook, 1838

Synonyms
- Salamandra talpoidea Holbrook, 1838

= Ambystoma talpoideum =

Mole salamander

Species of salamander

Ambystoma talpoideum, the mole salamander, is a species of salamander found in much of the eastern and central United States, from Florida to Texas, north to Illinois, east to Kentucky, with isolated populations in Virginia and Indiana. Older sources often refer to this species as the tadpole salamander because some individuals remain in a neotenic state. This salamander lives among the leaf litter on the forest floor, migrating to ponds to breed.

== Description ==
Mole salamanders are stocky, with short bodies and large heads. They can range from 4.5 to 10.9 cm (1.8 to 4.3 in) in length. Their weight can range from 3.5 to 10.5 g. They are normally gray or dark brown in color, with darker mottling and lighter gray undersides. Males can be distinguished by the presence of a swollen cloaca. Larvae and paedomorphic adults are aquatic and have large feathery gills. A. talpoideum can be distinguished from other salamander larvae by the presence of two light stripes on their underside

== Distribution and habitat ==
Mole salamanders are found in south eastern lowland areas of the Gulf Coastal Plains of the United States. Their main range extends from eastern Texas to southern South Carolina and inland as far as southern Illinois. It is absent from southern Florida and Louisiana, and there are separate populations in Kentucky, Virginia, Tennessee, North Carolina, northern South Carolina, northern Georgia and northern Alabama. There is also a small isolated population within the southernmost tip of Indiana. They inhabit floodplain pine or broadleaf forests, especially near gum and cypress ponds. Adults live under the surface of leaf litter while larvae are aquatic and found in ponds and ephemeral, fish-free waters. Populations of terrestrial adults are directly limited by density of refuges (burrows, logs, crevices, etc) needed for shelter, thermoregulation, and avoiding desiccation.

== Reproduction ==
Mole salamanders breed between October and March in semi-permanent ponds with surrounding areas suitable for burrowing and with adequate food. Males are less likely to mate in areas with multiple rival males.

== Behavior ==
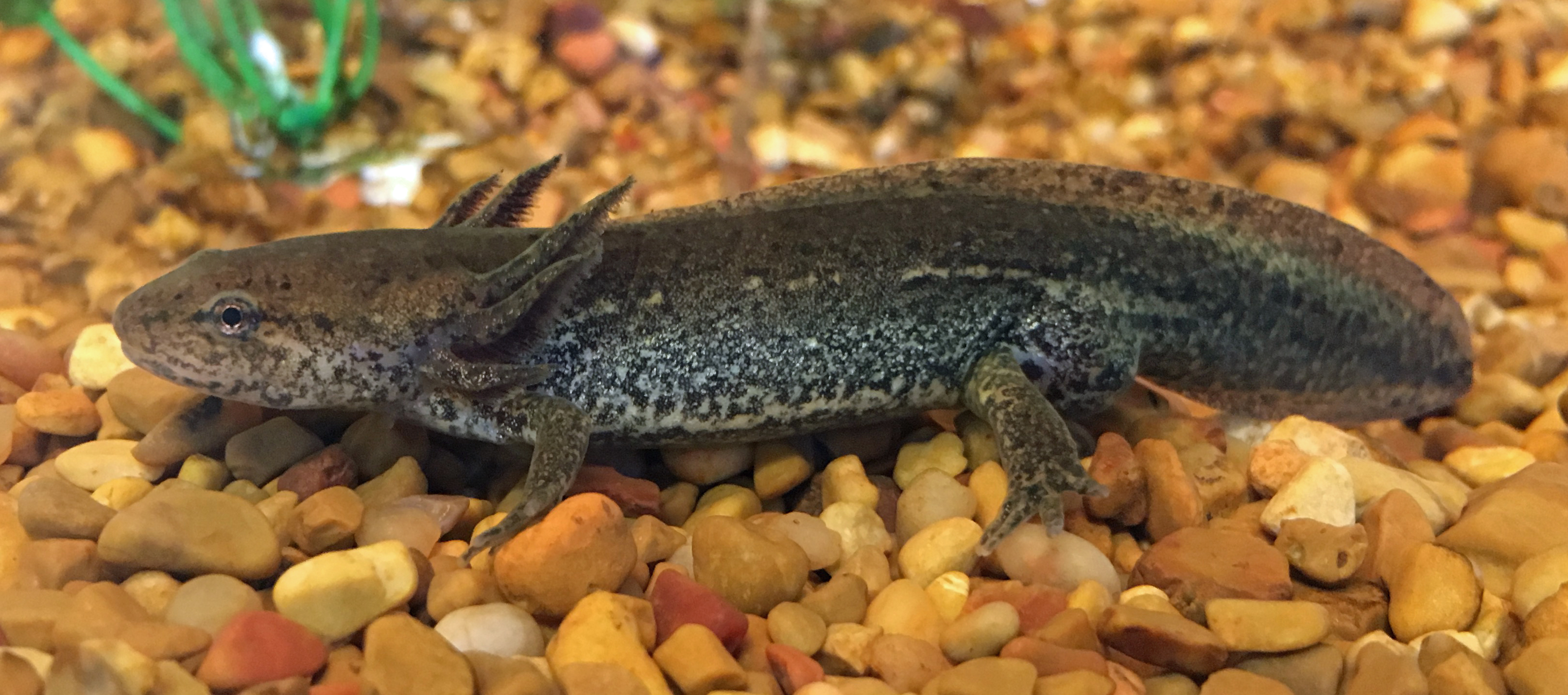
Paedomorphic male

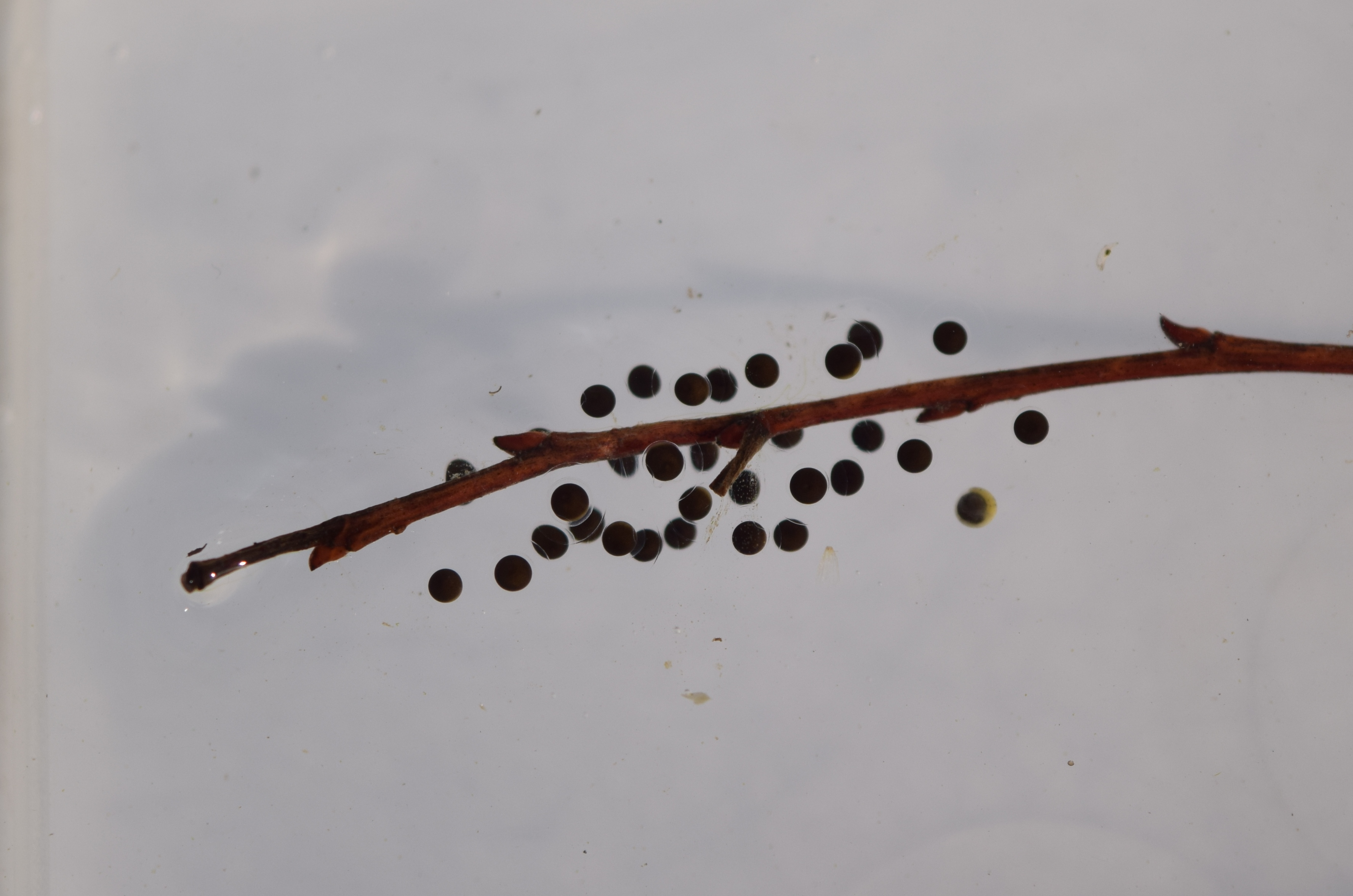
One egg mass

Primarily nocturnal, the mole salamander is found in habitats of moist forest debris, usually near a permanent source of water. The adult range is up to about 5 square metres (54 sq ft) and the animals migrate (up to 160 meters) to near bodies of water on rainy nights in winter when the breeding season approaches. The eggs are laid in the spring, during heavy rains. Some larvae undergo metamorphosis while others are neotenic and retain their gills. In larger bodies of water where predatory fish like the bluegill (Lepomis macrochirus) are present, metamorphosis is more common. When ponds were dried it also showed higher rates of metamorphosis. If ponds do not dry out then they tend to stay in a paedomorphic state. However, because this species exhibits falcutative pedomorphosis, paedomorphic adults can still undergo metamorphosis later in life if environmental conditions-such as drying ponds or reduced aquatic habitat quality favor a transition to a terrestrial lifestyle. When attacked, adults and juveniles lower their heads to expose their parotoid glands which exude a noxious secretion. This salamander is an opportunistic feeder, eating almost anything smaller than itself which it can overpower, including various arthropods and tadpoles. It has been revealed that A. talpoideum's diet consists almost completely of various arthropods and only a small number of other Ambystomatidae larvae.

== Conservation ==
In its Red List of Threatened Species, the IUCN lists Ambystoma talpoideum as being "Least Concern" because the population trend is stable. Threats to this species include destruction of forest ponds and swamp habitat, the filling in or deepening of breeding ponds, and the introduction of predatory fish. Dating back to 2005, the mole salamander has been classified as an "imperiled" species in Virginia according to the Virginia Wildlife Action Plan. In Indiana, the mole salamander is listed as an endangered species.
