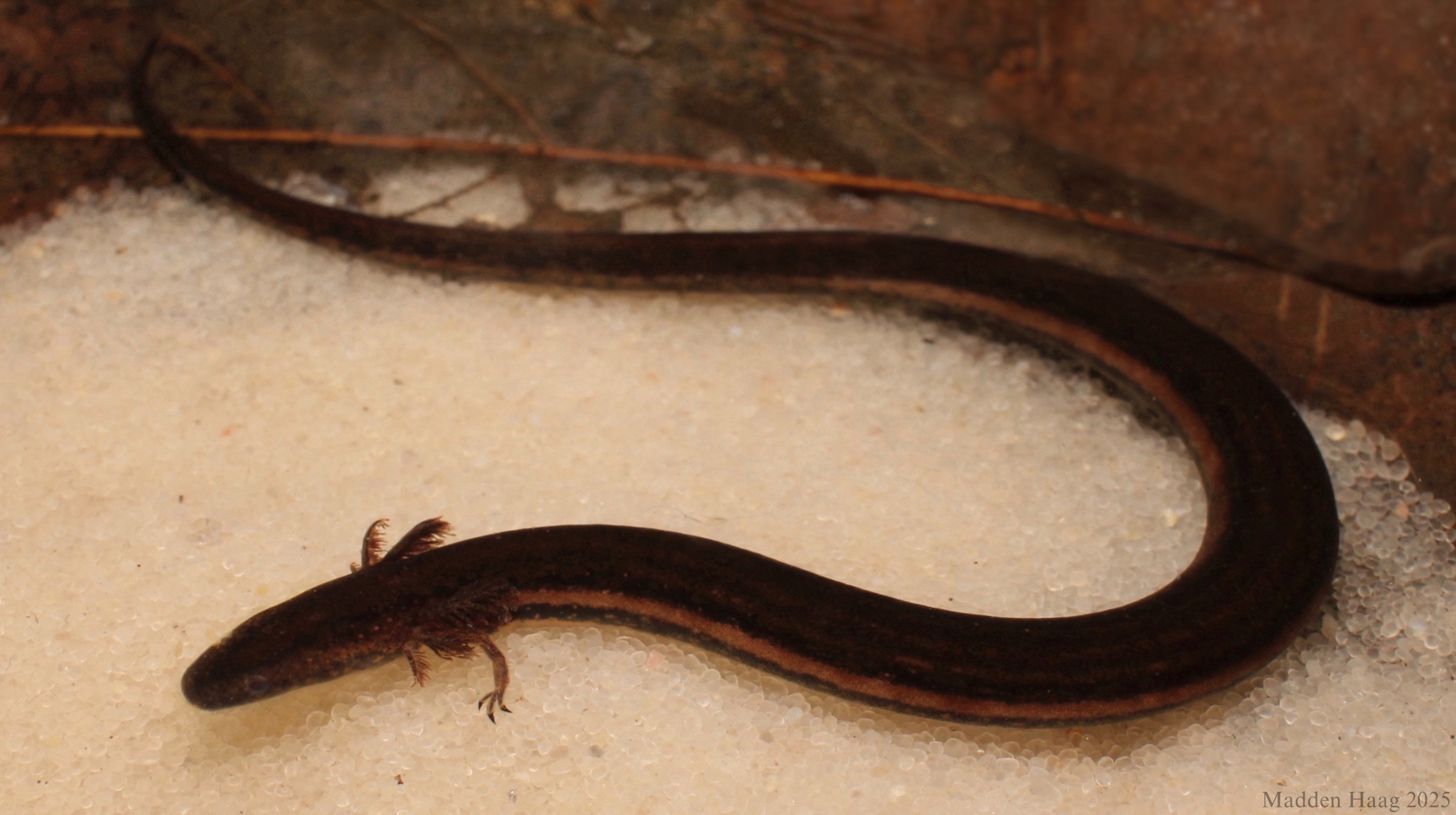
- Northern dwarf siren (Pseudobranchus striatus)

Conservation status
- Least Concern (IUCN 3.1)

Scientific classification
- Kingdom: Animalia
- Phylum: Chordata
- Class: Amphibia
- Order: Urodela
- Family: Sirenidae
- Genus: Pseudobranchus
- Species: P. striatus

Binomial name
- Pseudobranchus striatus (Le Conte, 1824)
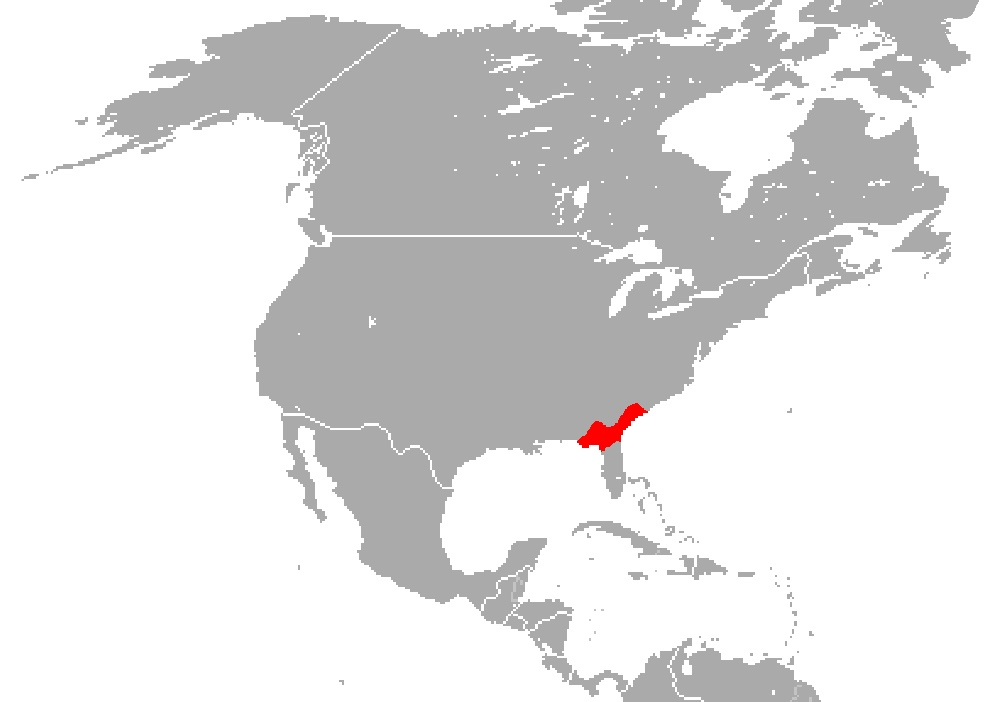

Synonyms
- Siren striata LeConte, 1824

= Northern dwarf siren =

Species of amphibian

The northern dwarf siren (Pseudobranchus striatus) is a perennibranch salamander lacking hind legs. Found in the Southeastern United States, it one of two currently recognized species of dwarf sirens. Three subspecies are currently recognized; P. s. striatus, the broad-striped dwarf siren, P. s. lustricolus, the Gulf Hammock dwarf siren, and P. s. spheniscus, the slender dwarf siren.

== Description ==
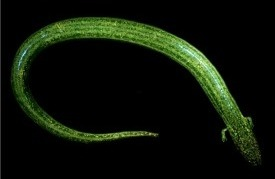
Biofluorescence in a Northern dwarf siren

The northern dwarf siren is the smallest siren known, at only 4.0–9.9 in (10–25 cm). Like other members of the Sirenidae, the northern dwarf siren is aquatic and gilled throughout its life. Being slender and almost eel-like, it is noticeable because of the light stripes on its side compared to the brown or light-grey dorsum. The siren has only one gill slit, a finned tail (tip compressed), costal grooves, and three toes on each of the two front feet. They are very secretive and dwell among water hyacinth roots and amid debris at pond bottoms. They feed on tiny invertebrates, and during droughts, encase themselves in mud beneath the pond bottom. When handled or caught, they make faint yelping noises.

== Breeding ==
Northern dwarf sirens breed in the spring and gather in large numbers at the pond or spring where they were born. Male and female sirens can not be determined through external examination. The sirens fertilize externally and lay a large number of membrane-enclosed eggs. The eggs are laid singly on roots of aquatic plants, and the larvae hatch about a month after they have been laid at about 0.6 in (14 mm). They tend to take 4 years to reach sexual maturity and can have up to 61 eggs in a single breeding season.

== Habitat and range ==
This particular siren tends to live in shallow ditches, cypress swamps, and weed-choked ponds on the coastal plains of South Carolina, Georgia, and Florida.

== Subspecies ==
- The broad-striped northern dwarf siren (P. s. striatus) is short and stocky, with a broad, dark-brown stripe down the back and a thin, light vertebral stripe flanked by a broad yellow or buff stripe. They are found from southern South Carolina to northeast Florida.
- The slender northern dwarf siren (P. s. spheniscus) has a narrow head, a wedge-shaped snout, and two distinct tan or yellow stripes on both sides. It is found in scattered locales in southwest Georgia and the Florida panhandle.
- The Gulf Hammock northern dwarf siren (P. s. lustricolus) has a large and stout form, with a flattened head and blunt snout. Three narrow light stripes within the wide dark stripe run down the back, with two side stripes (top one orange-brown, bottom silvery-white). This subspecies has not been seen since 1951, when it was originally described. It is known only from Levy and Citrus Counties, Florida.
