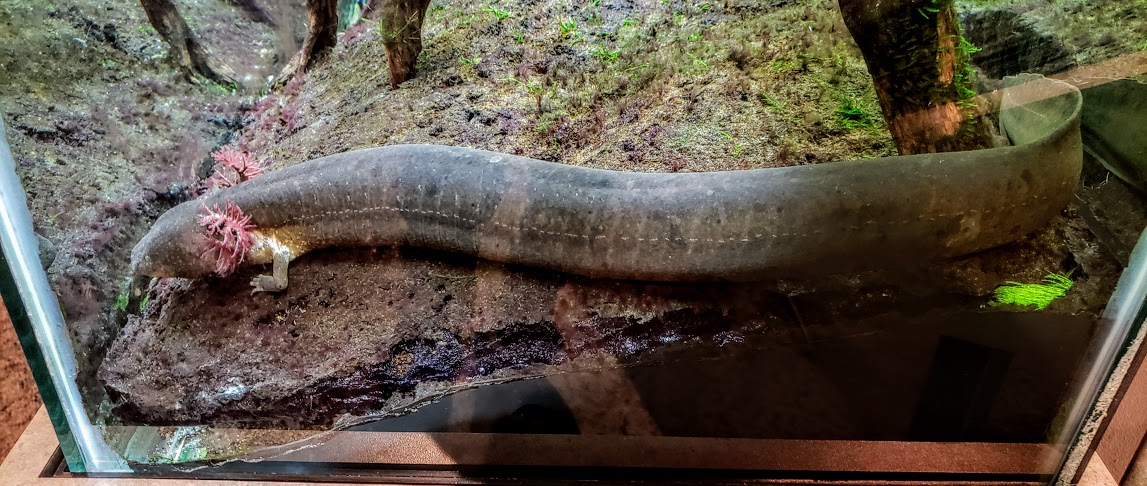

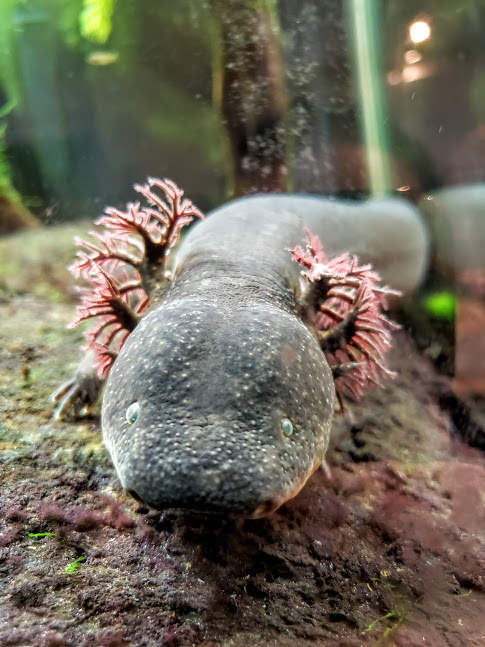

Conservation status
- Least Concern (IUCN 3.1)

- Secure (NatureServe)

Scientific classification
- Kingdom: Animalia
- Phylum: Chordata
- Class: Amphibia
- Order: Urodela
- Family: Sirenidae
- Genus: Siren
- Species: S. lacertina

Binomial name
- Siren lacertina Linnaeus, 1766
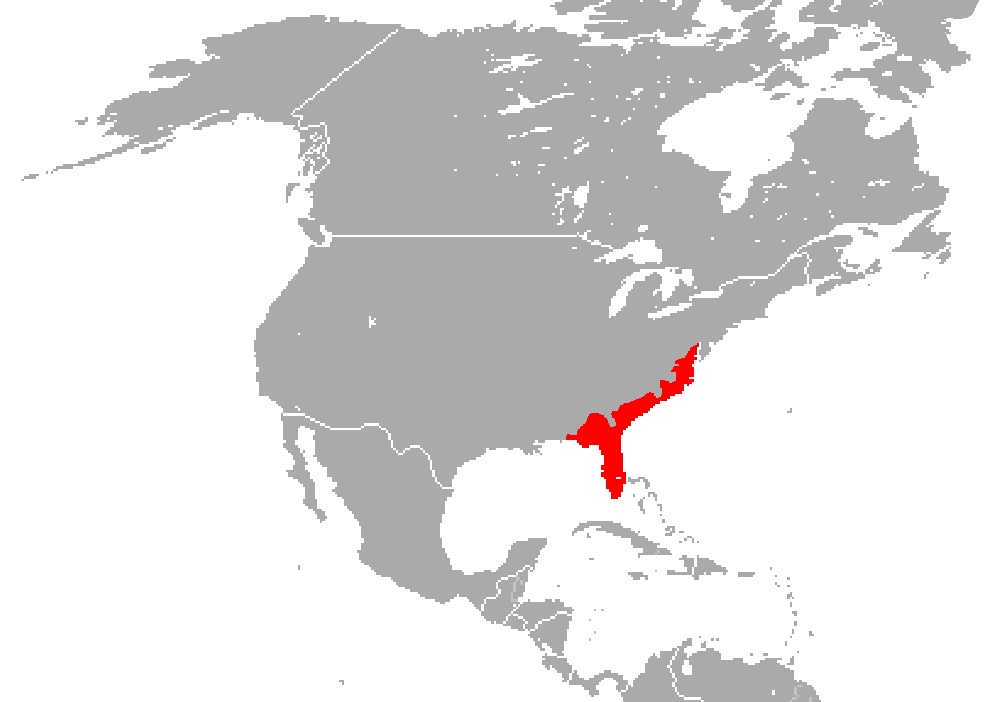

= Greater siren =

Greater siren Temporal range: Blancan–present

Species of amphibian

The greater siren (Siren lacertina) is an amphibian and one of the five members of the genus Siren. The largest of the sirens and one of the largest amphibians in North America, the greater siren resides in the coastal plains of the southeastern United States.

== Description ==
The greater siren is the third longest salamander in the Western Hemisphere. S. lacertina is paedomorphic, as are all sirens. They lack hindlimbs as well as a pelvic girdle, and have external gills all throughout their lives along with small lungs. They lack eyelids, and have an unfused pectoral girdle. Greater sirens measure around 1.5 cm (0.59 in) in length upon hatching and then grow to lengths ranging from 18 to 97 cm (7 to 38 in). Weight can range from 55 to 1,000 g (1.9 to 35.3 oz). Coloration varies throughout their range, but they are generally an olive or gray color with small yellow or green dots on their sides. They have about 36 to 40 costal grooves between their armpits and their cloaca. Younger sirens also have a light stripe along their sides, which fades with age. The front legs, each with four toes, are so small that they can be hidden in the gills.

In terms of sensory organs, greater sirens rely on both a modified Jacobson's organ and a lateral line system over their small eyes. It is possible that they are capable of sensing disturbances in electrical fields, specifically through dense clusters of neuromasts located on the head.

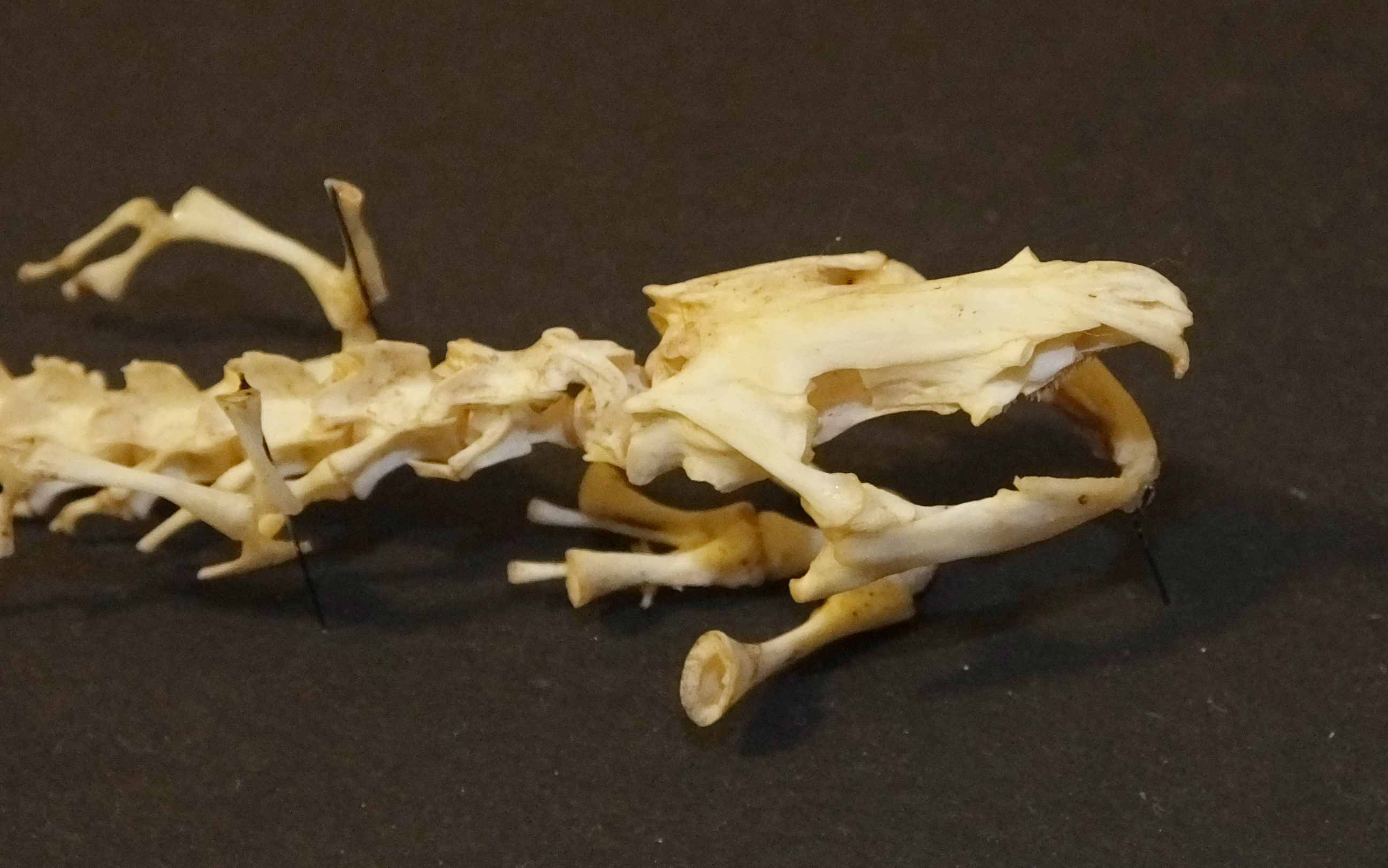
Greater siren skull & hyoid

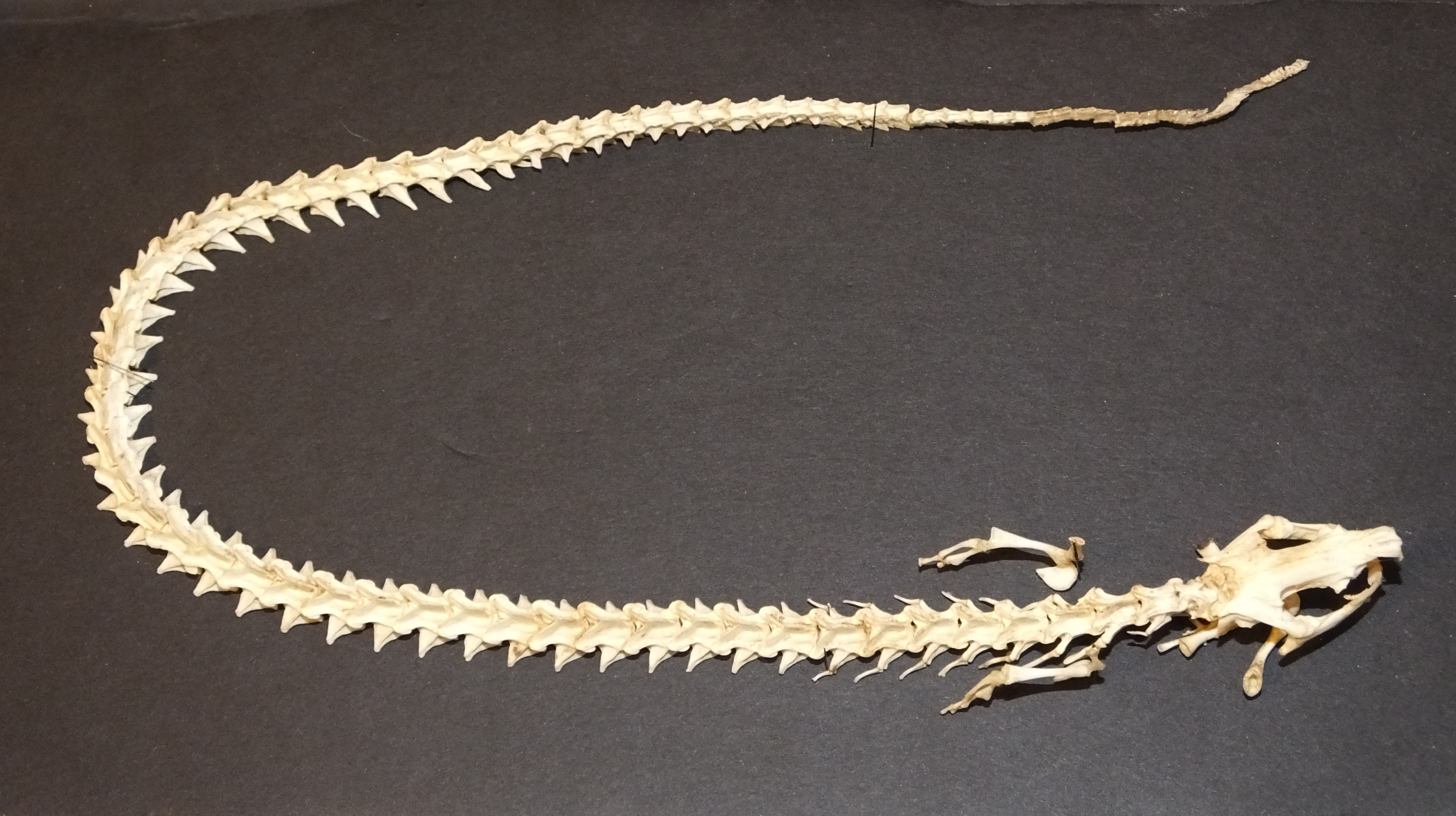
Greater siren skeleton

== Ecology and behavior ==
Greater sirens play a crucial role in aquatic food webs and have been described as midlevel predators. Sirens swallow molluscs whole and will pass the shell as waste. They are nocturnal and spend the day in dense vegetation. S. lacertina has a bipedal-undulatory gait while moving underwater, meaning they combine two-legged movement with side-to-side body swaying. Their lifespan in the wild is unknown, but in captivity they can live up to 25 years. Greater sirens can vocalize, producing clicks or yelps sounding similar to the call of the American green tree frog. They are able to aestivate for multiple years if necessary, burrowing into mud and exuding a cocoon of dead skin cells. This has been seen during times of drought and hydroperiod fluctuations and might last as long as three years in large individuals with high lipid content. They are also capable of trimodal respiration, with gas exchange occurring across branchial, cutaneous, and pulmonary surfaces. Known predators include the American alligator and the mud snake. Other predators of this species are poorly documented. However, on June 19, 2008, a greater siren was consumed by a two-toed amphiuma, indicating that this species could be an additional predator of the greater siren.

=== Diet ===
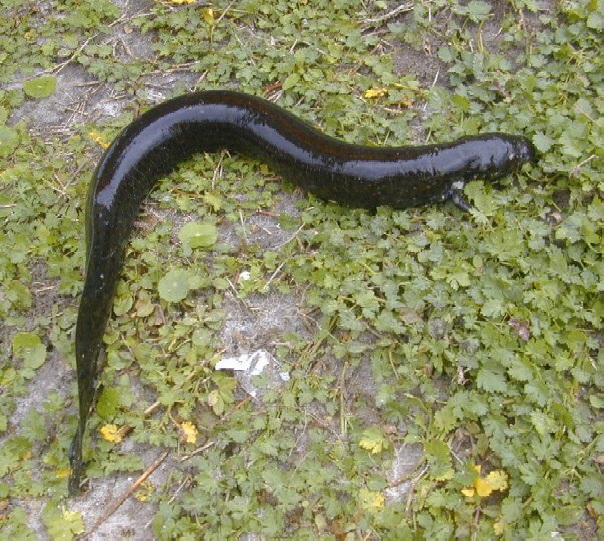
Greater siren out of water

Greater sirens are carnivorous and prey upon invertebrates (such as insects, crustaceans, gastropods, bivalves, spiders, molluscs, and crayfish) and aquatic vertebrates (such as small fish) with a possible preference for molluscs (such as snails and freshwater clams), although they have been observed to eat vegetation such as vascular plants and algae. In addition, materials that are non-animal were found in their digestive tract added to amounts of 75% or greater. Individuals of this species have small teeth to grasp prey, but they contribute little to the mastication of food and do not rupture or grind ingested invertebrates, algae, or plants requiring prior fermentation in the gut. However, although greater sirens are mostly carnivorous, recent research has shown that they may ingest some vegetation, which is then fermented in the gut via microbes.

=== Reproduction ===
Their spermatozoa possess a pair of flagella, and their courtship behavior is unknown. Mating occurs in February and March, and females will lay a clutch of about 500 eggs. After the eggs have been laid, the father will continuously fan its tail back and forth over or through the nest. The father will aggressively guard the nest from potential threats, including other sirens, and even the mother of the clutch. After 2 months, the eggs hatch, and the fathers depart from the nest. Youth live in shallower water than adults, often among the roots of water hyacinths.

== Distribution and habitat ==
Greater sirens inhabit the coastal plain from Washington, D.C., to Florida and Alabama. A population of sirens in the Rio Grande around Texas and Tamaulipas in Mexico was tentatively determined to be S. lacertina; however, recent studies have refuted this claim. Greater sirens live in wetlands, preferring those with a slow or nonexistent current and a thick layer of organic material. They are capable of inhabiting seasonal and permanent wetlands given their ability to aestivate, and will burrow into mud if their wetland dries up. They are predominately found in the deep benthic zone where aquatic insects are most abundant. Associated habitat for greater sirens includes vegetative ditches, and various other forms of slow, or stagnant bodies of water. Often during the day, they seek refuges from predators and are found under logs and various other structures.

== Interaction with humans ==
=== Trapping techniques ===
S. lacertina is difficult to capture because of their preference for areas with thick vegetation. Standard methods such as dip-netting, seining, and dredges are ineffective in such habitats. The use of aquatic funnel traps, commercially produced to capture crayfish, has been found effective for use on Siren and Amphiuma species and there is no risk of drowning the animals. Each trap consists of the trap body, three funnels, and a neck with a lid at the top.

=== Conservation ===
Greater sirens are classified as Least Concern by the International Union for Conservation of Nature, although they have been extirpated from some of their former range due to habitat loss. Batrachochytrium dendrobatidis (Bd), a fungal pathogen that commonly affects amphibians, has been found in greater sirens. While the population impacts are unknown, Bd is responsible for an overall global decline in amphibians. They are protected under Mexican law and are assigned to the "Special Protection" category.
