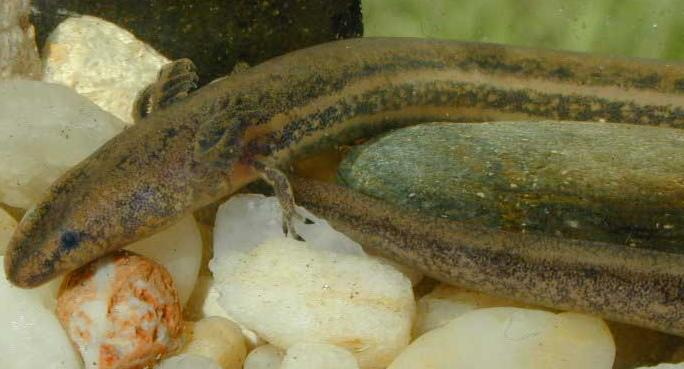
- Pseudobranchus striatus

Scientific classification
- Kingdom: Animalia
- Phylum: Chordata
- Class: Amphibia
- Order: Urodela
- Family: Sirenidae
- Genus: Pseudobranchus; Gray, 1825

Diversity
- 2 extant species
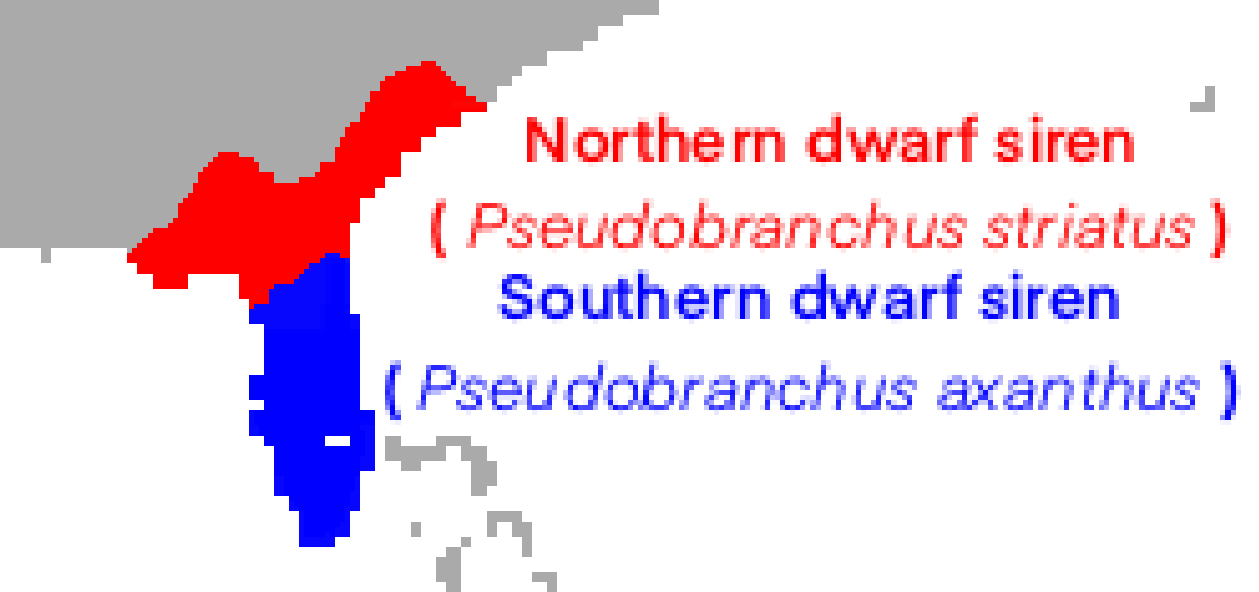

= Dwarf siren =

Dwarf siren Temporal range: Miocene–present

Genus of salamanders

Dwarf sirens are eel-like salamanders of the genus Pseudobranchus. Dwarf sirens possess external gills throughout adulthood and lack hind legs, and can be distinguished from members of the genus Siren in that dwarf sirens have three toes on each foot rather than four. Whereas sirens have three gill slits, dwarf sirens keep just a single slit. Like sirens, dwarf sirens are restricted to the Southeastern United States.

== Species ==
The genus Pseudobranchus consists of the following extant species:

- Southern dwarf siren (P. axanthus)
  - Narrow-striped dwarf siren (P. a. axanthus)
  - Everglades dwarf siren (P. a. belli)
- Northern dwarf siren (P. striatus)
  - Broad-striped dwarf siren (P. s. striatus)
  - Gulf Hammock dwarf siren (P. s. lustricolus)
  - Slender dwarf siren (P. s. spheniscus)

There are also two extinct species known from fossil evidence:

- †Pseudobranchus vetustus (Miocene to Pliocene of Florida)
- †Pseudobranchus robustus (Pleistocene of Florida)
