= Henry Street salamander tunnels =

Amphibian tunnels in Amherst, Massachusetts

Coordinates: 42.4115°N 72.5054°W

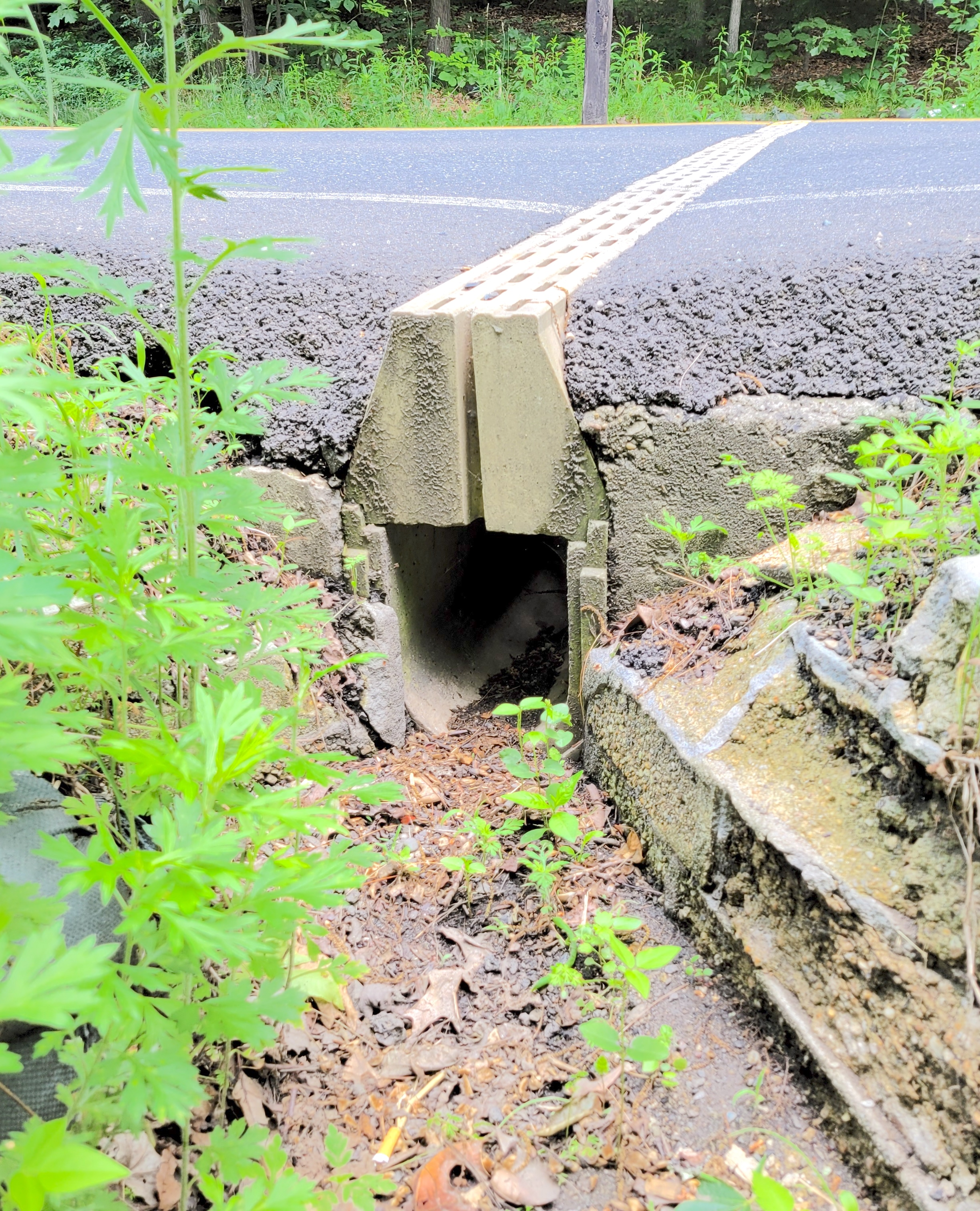
Western end of the southern Henry Street tunnel

The Henry Street salamander tunnels are two amphibian tunnels in Amherst, Massachusetts, United States, built in 1987 to assist salamander migration between their overwintering grounds and their breeding grounds, an annual courtship event known as the Big Night. Previously, spotted salamanders (Ambystoma maculatum) were often crushed by vehicles as they crossed Henry Street. They winter on its east side and cross westward in the spring to breed in what is known as a salamander congress in the vernal pools that form there.

In the early 1980s, volunteers carried salamanders across Henry Street in buckets to protect them from traffic. In 1987, a German drainage company built tunnels under the street to assist the salamander migration. The town continues to use volunteers to help any salamanders who miss the tunnel; they also temporarily close the street when the migration is underway. There are two tunnels spaced 200 ft (60 m) apart, and they are the first amphibian tunnels in the United States.

== Background ==
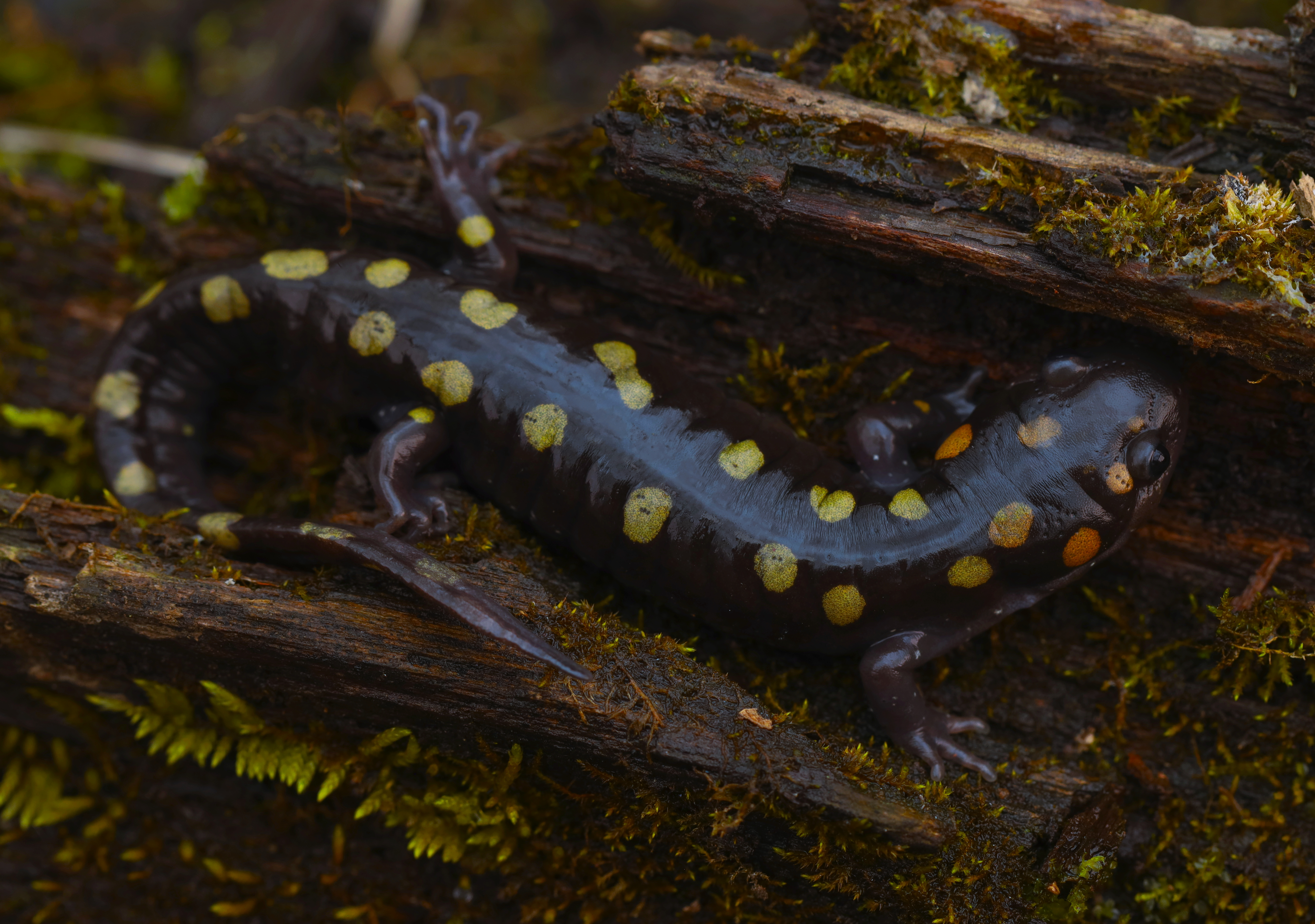
Spotted salamander (Ambystoma maculatum) at vernal pool in Missouri

Henry Street is a two-lane street in North Amherst, Massachusetts, United States. Spotted salamanders (Ambystoma maculatum) cross the street to get from their overwintering sites in the wooded area east of the roadway to their breeding sites to the west. In the spring after rain and when temperatures rise above 40 °F (4 °C), salamanders emerge from underground. They cross Henry Street to get to their breeding grounds, vernal pools which form on the other side of the road, an event common among amphibians and known as the Big Night. (Note: When male and female salamanders meet in the vernal pools it is called a salamander congress. The pools dry up in the summer so fish and other predators cannot survive: this makes the pools a good place for salamanders to breed and lay eggs. Normally fish would eat salamander eggs, but in the vernal pools the eggs are safe. The hatched salamanders can also thrive.) Before volunteers began assisting the salamander crossing, it was common for passing vehicles to run over the salamanders, which reduced their population.

To facilitate safer salamander crossings, the town of Amherst created tunnels under Henry Street so that migrating salamanders could cross the street. Salamanders winter on the east side of Henry Street in the forest, and they cross to the west side each spring. The salamanders use the vernal pools that form on the west side of Henry Street as breeding ponds. There are two tunnels which are 10 inches (25 cm) high and 6 inches (15 cm) wide; there are slots in the roadway to allow moisture to leach into the tunnel system. In the forest, there are long fences that lead salamanders and other amphibians toward the mouth of the tunnels. The two salamander tunnels are spaced 200 ft (60 m) apart. The tunnels were the first amphibian tunnels in the United States. The design was modified from airport runway drains.

== History ==
In the early 1980s, volunteers assisted the salamander crossing with a bucket brigade. (Note: In New Hampshire people still hand-move salamanders. The Harris Center for Conservation Education organizes a salamander Crossing Brigade made up of volunteers each year. In New Jersey volunteers assist salamanders and other amphibians crossing roads. New York state has a similar volunteer salamander assist project.) Volunteers waited along Henry Street and put migrating salamanders in buckets to carry them across the street. In 1987 a German drainage company (ACO Polymer) heard the story about volunteers assisting the salamander crossing and paid for a tunnel project under Henry Street. The Amherst Department of Public Works, University of Massachusetts, the Hitchcock Center for the Environment and the Massachusetts Audubon Society supported the project. It is estimated that 100 to 200 animals use the tunnels annually. Volunteers watch for salamanders that miss the tunnels and assist them. In 1988 fifty people came out to watch the migration when the tunnels opened.

After the success of the Henry Street tunnels, the state of California built salamander tunnels under roads. The United States Geological Survey has conducted studies to see if salamanders are using the tunnels. They also determined that the correct distance between tunnels is a maximum of 41 ft (12.5 m). The study also determined that the barrier wall that funnels salamanders into the tunnels is more efficient if solid. Mesh barriers did not work as well.

In 2024, the town of Amherst closed Henry Street for two days so that salamanders not using the tunnels would not be run over. The Hitchcock Center for the Environment partnered with the town to arrange for volunteers to assist salamanders that do not use the tunnels. Many people come to watch the crossing each year.

== Gallery ==
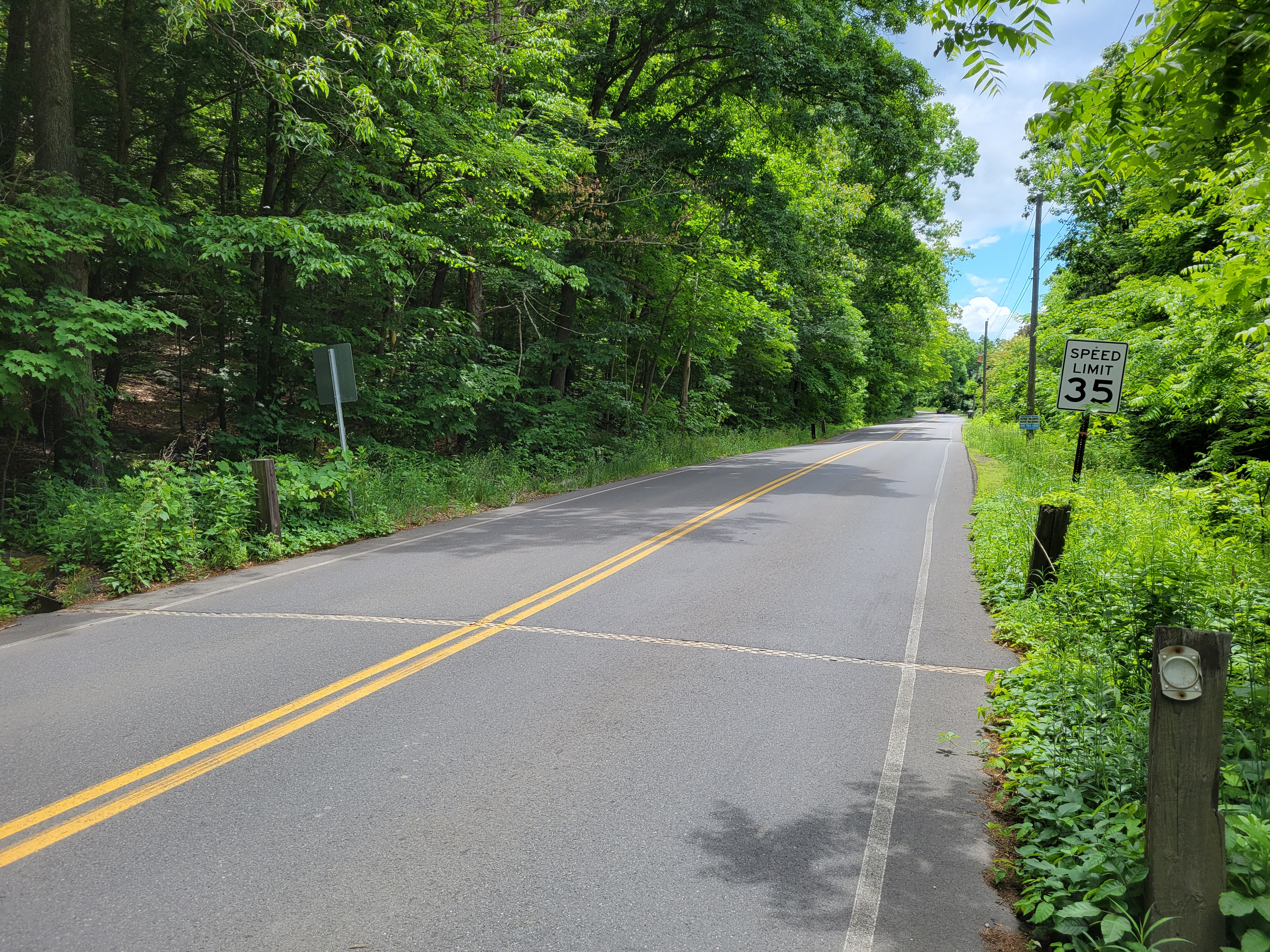
Henry Street at a salamander tunnel

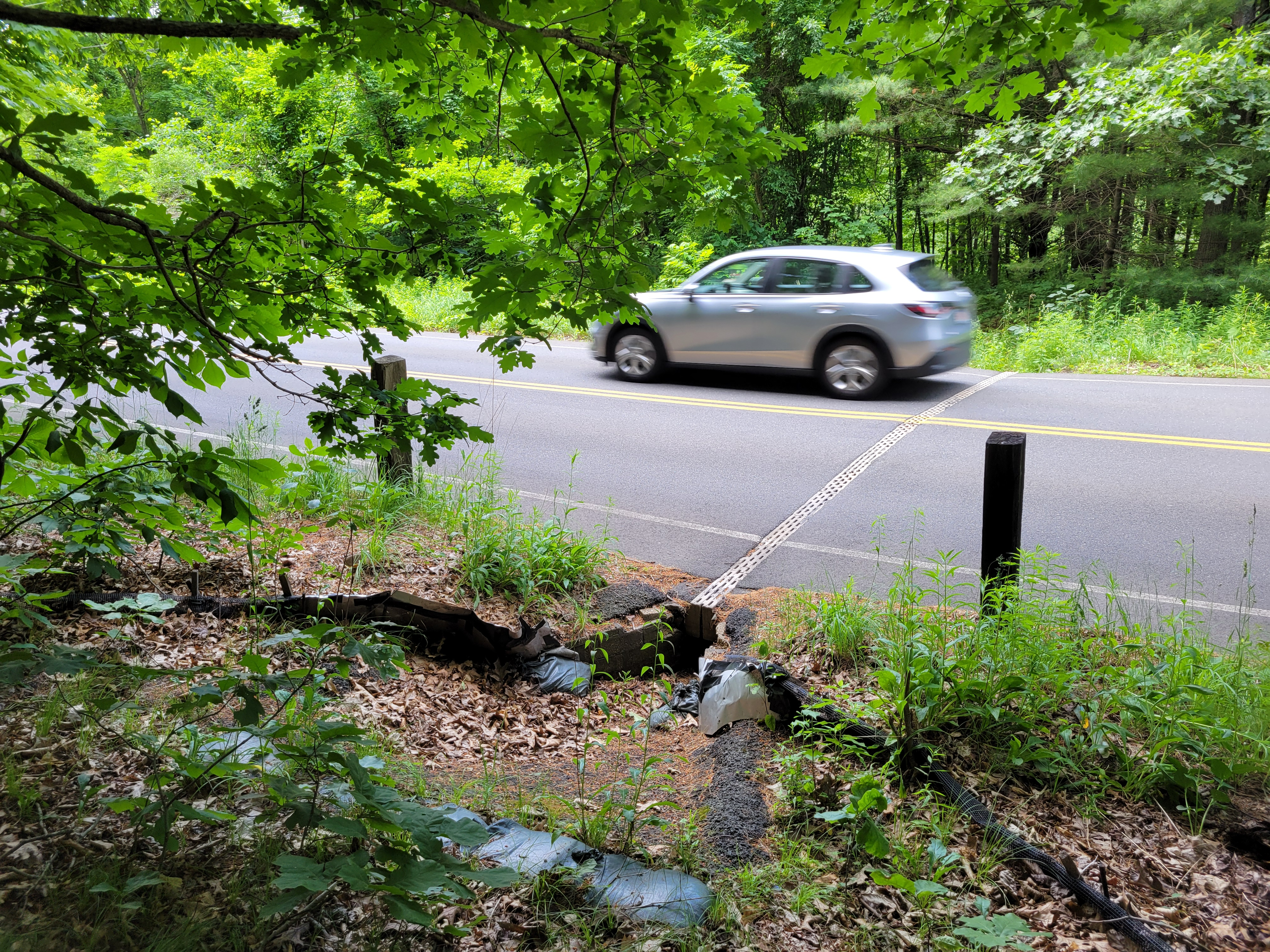
Henry Street showing traffic crossing a tunnel

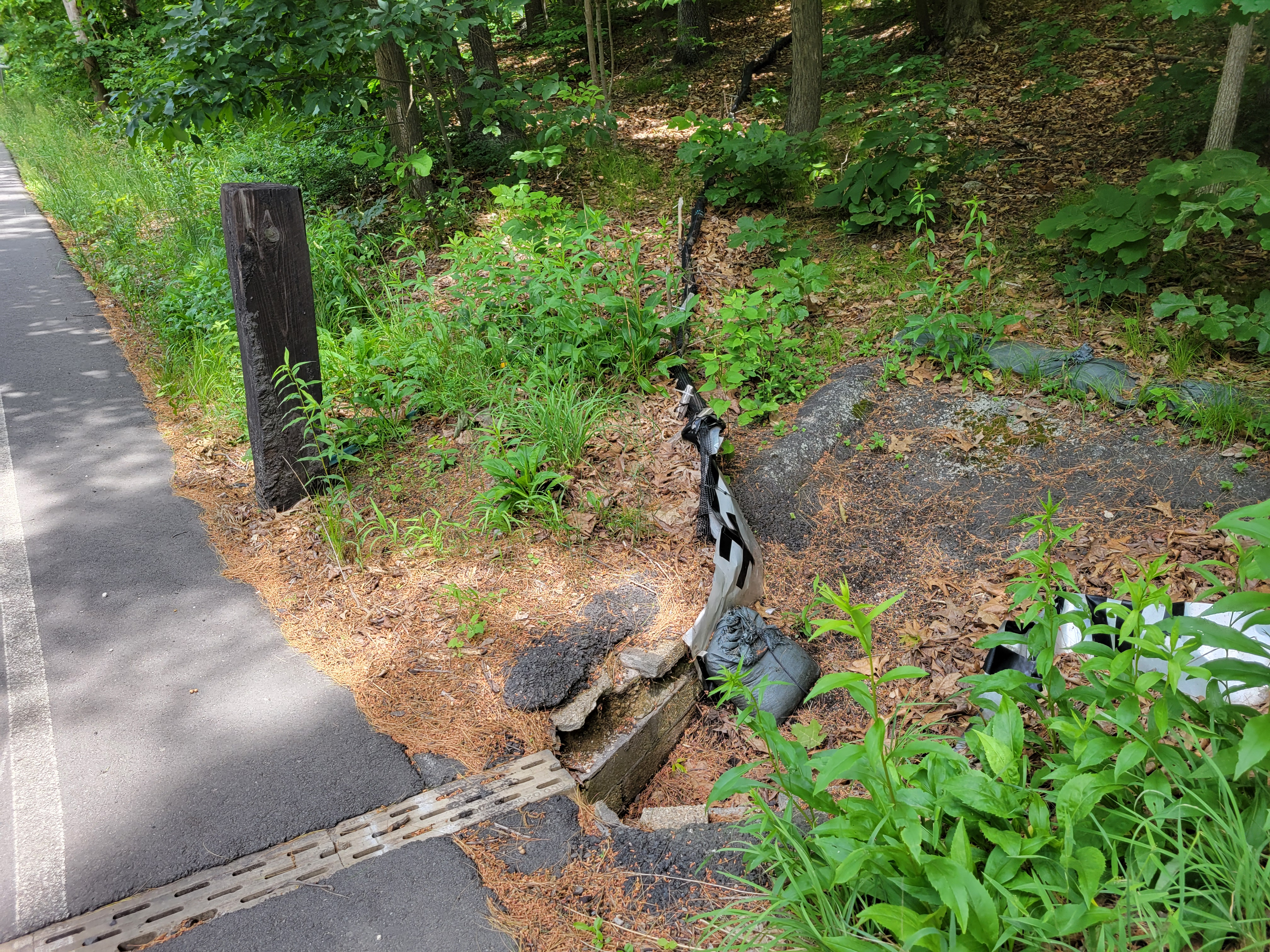
Henry Street salamander tunnel with fencing

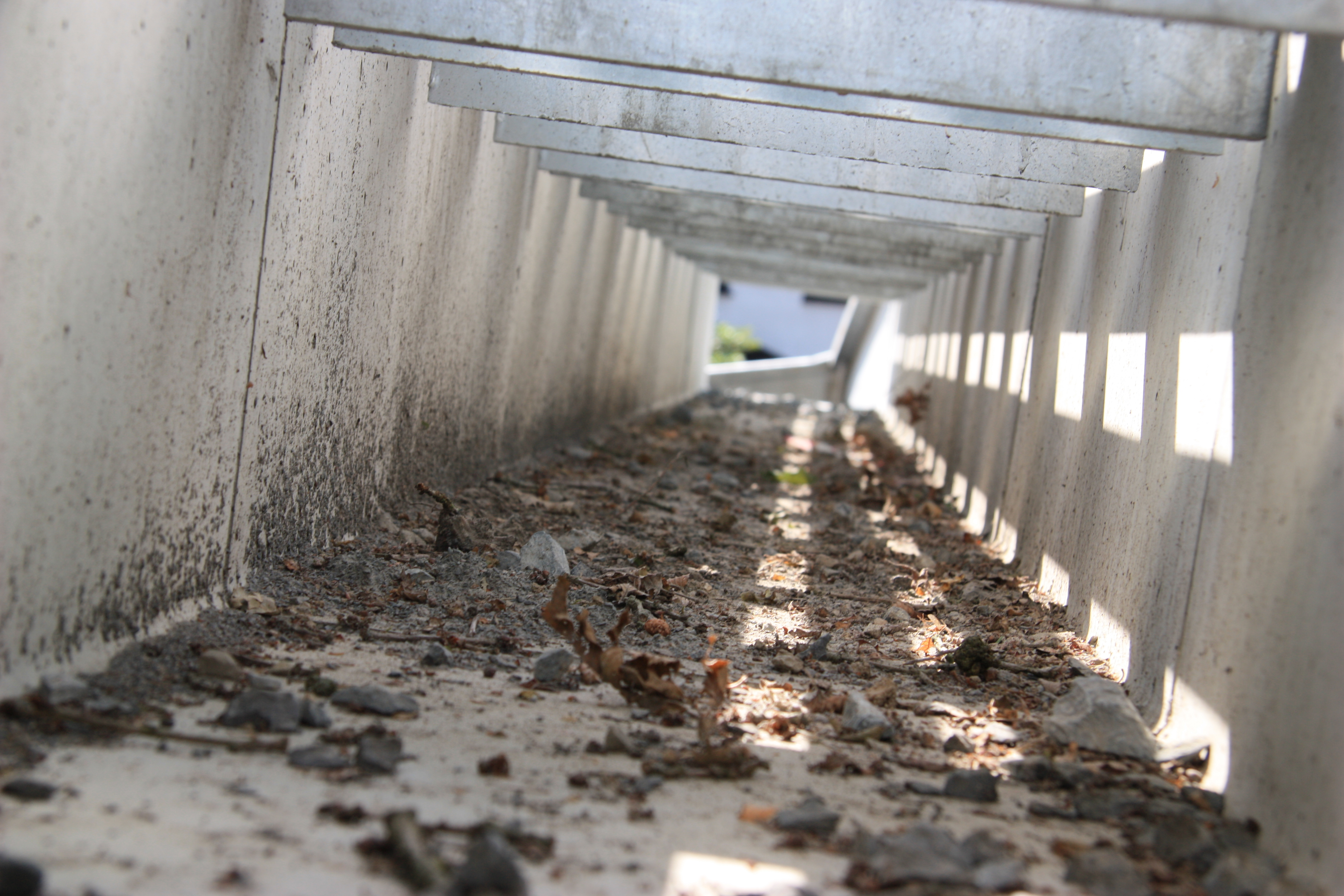
Interior of an amphibian and reptile tunnel in Germany

== See also ==
- Wildlife crossing – Structures enabling wildlife to safely cross human-made barriers
- Bat bridge
- Toad tunnel
- Squirrel bridge
- The Pollinator Pathway
- Paseo del Jaguar
- Culvert
- Habitat corridor
- Landscape connectivity
- Urbanization
