= Wildlife crossing =

Structures enabling wildlife to safely cross human-made barriers

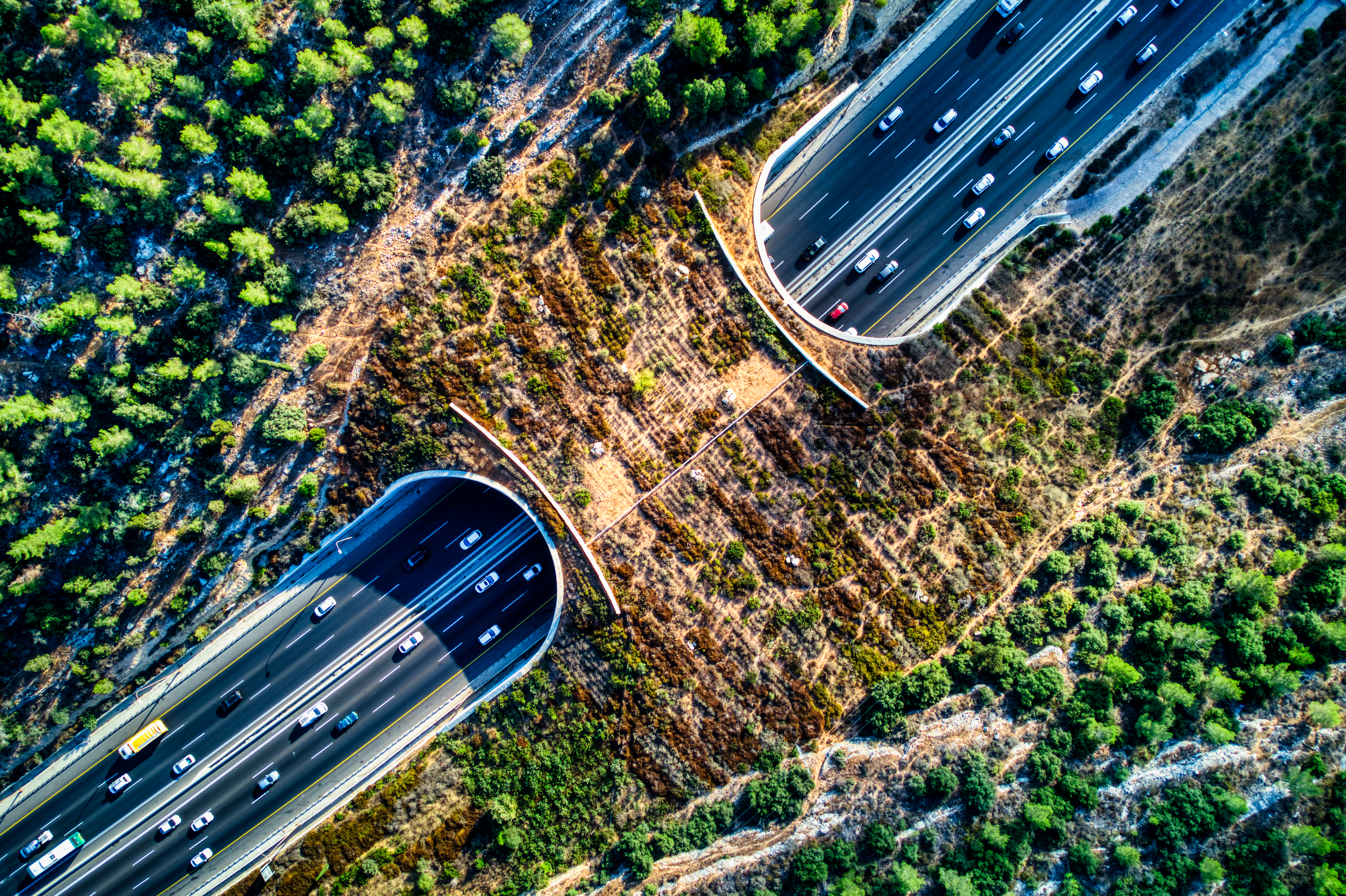
Wildlife crossing, Highway 1 (Israel)

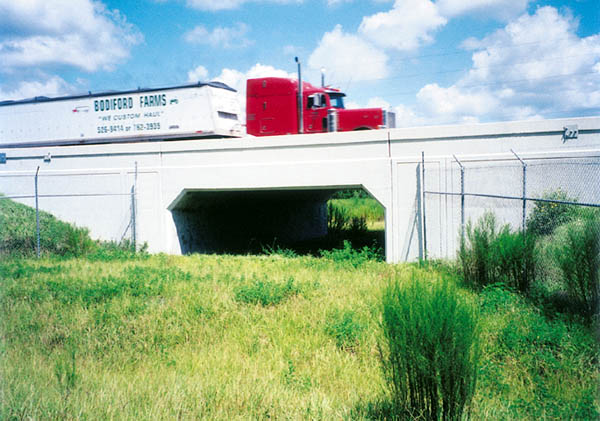
Florida State Route 46 was elevated over this underpass. There are channeling fences on either side of the crossing.

Drone video of Kolu wildlife overpass in Estonia (September 2021)

Wildlife crossings are structures that allow animals to cross human-made barriers safely. Wildlife crossings may include underpass tunnels or wildlife tunnels, viaducts, and overpasses or green bridges (mainly for large or herd-type animals); amphibian and reptile tunnels; fish ladders; canopy bridges (especially for monkeys and squirrels); tunnels and culverts (for small mammals such as otters, hedgehogs, and badgers); and green roofs (for butterflies and birds).

Wildlife crossings are a practice in habitat conservation, allowing connections or reconnections between habitats, combating habitat fragmentation. They also assist in avoiding collisions between vehicles and animals, which in addition to killing or injuring wildlife may cause injury or death to humans and property damage.

Similar structures can be used for domesticated animals, such as cattle creeps.

== Roads and habitat fragmentation ==
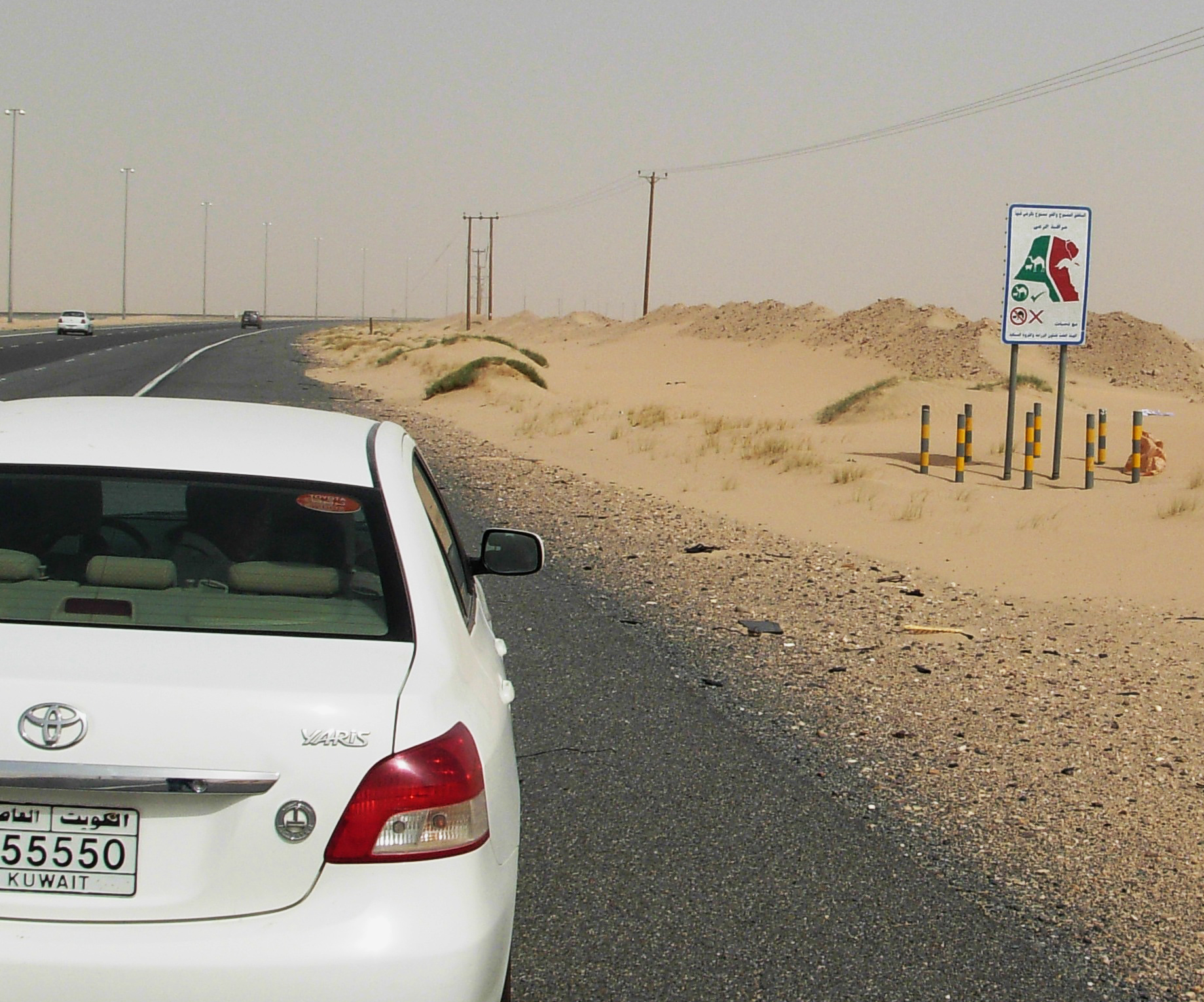
Camel crossing in Kuwait

Habitat fragmentation occurs when human-made barriers such as roads, railroads, canals, electric power lines, and pipelines penetrate and divide wildlife habitat. Of these, roads have the most widespread and detrimental effects. Scientists estimate that the system of roads in the United States affects the ecology of at least one-fifth of the land area of the country. For many years ecologists and conservationists have documented the adverse relationship between roads and wildlife, and identify four ways that roads and traffic detrimentally affect wildlife populations: (1) they decrease habitat amount and quality, (2) they increase mortality due to wildlife-vehicle collisions (road kill), (3) they prevent access to resources on the other side of the road, and (4) they subdivide wildlife populations into smaller and more vulnerable sub-populations (fragmentation). Habitat fragmentation can lead to extinction or extirpation if a population's gene pool is restricted enough.

The first three effects (loss of habitat, road kill, and isolation from resources) exert pressure on various animal populations by reducing available resources and directly killing individuals in a population. For instance, found that road kills do not pose a significant threat to healthy populations but can be devastating to small, shrinking, or threatened populations. Road mortality has significantly affected a number of prominent species in the United States, including white-tailed deer (Odocoileus virginianus), Florida panthers (Puma concolor coryi), and black bears (Ursus americanus). In addition, habitat loss can be direct, if habitat is destroyed to make room for a road, or indirect, if habitat quality close to roads is compromised due to emissions from the roads (e.g. noise, light, runoff, pollution, etc.). Finally, species that are unable to migrate across roads to reach resources such as food, shelter and mates will experience reduced reproductive and survival rates, which can compromise population viability.

In addition to the first three factors, numerous studies have shown that the construction and use of roads is a direct source of habitat fragmentation. As mentioned above, populations surrounded by roads are less likely to receive immigrants from other habitats and as a result, they suffer from a lack of genetic diversity. These small populations are particularly vulnerable to extinction due to demographic, genetic, and environmental stochasticity because they do not contain enough alleles to adapt to new selective pressures such as changes in temperature, habitat, and food availability.

The relationship between roads and habitat fragmentation is well documented. One study found that roads contribute more to fragmentation in forest habitats than clear cuts. Another study concluded that road fragmentation of formerly contiguous forest in eastern North America is the primary cause for the decline of forest bird species and has also significantly harmed small mammals, insects, and reptiles in the United States. After years of research, biologists agree that roads and traffic lead to habitat fragmentation, isolation and road kill, all of which combine to significantly compromise the viability of wildlife populations throughout the world.

== Wildlife-vehicle collisions ==
Wildlife-vehicle collisions have a significant cost for human populations because collisions damage property and injure and kill passengers and drivers. Research in the 1990s estimated the number of collisions with ungulates in traffic in Europe at 507,000 per year, resulting in 300 people killed, 30,000 injured, and property damage exceeding $1 billion. In parallel, 1.5 million traffic accidents involving deer in the United States cause an estimated $1.1 billion in vehicle damage each year. On a larger scale, research indicates that wildlife-vehicle collisions in the United States result in 29,000 injuries and more than 200 fatalities per year.

The conservation issues associated with roads (wildlife mortality and habitat fragmentation) coupled with the substantial human and economic costs resulting from wildlife-vehicle collisions have caused scientists, engineers, and transportation authorities to consider a number of mitigation tools for reducing the conflict between roads and wildlife. Of the currently available options, structures known as wildlife crossings have been the most successful at reducing both habitat fragmentation and wildlife-vehicle collisions caused by roads.

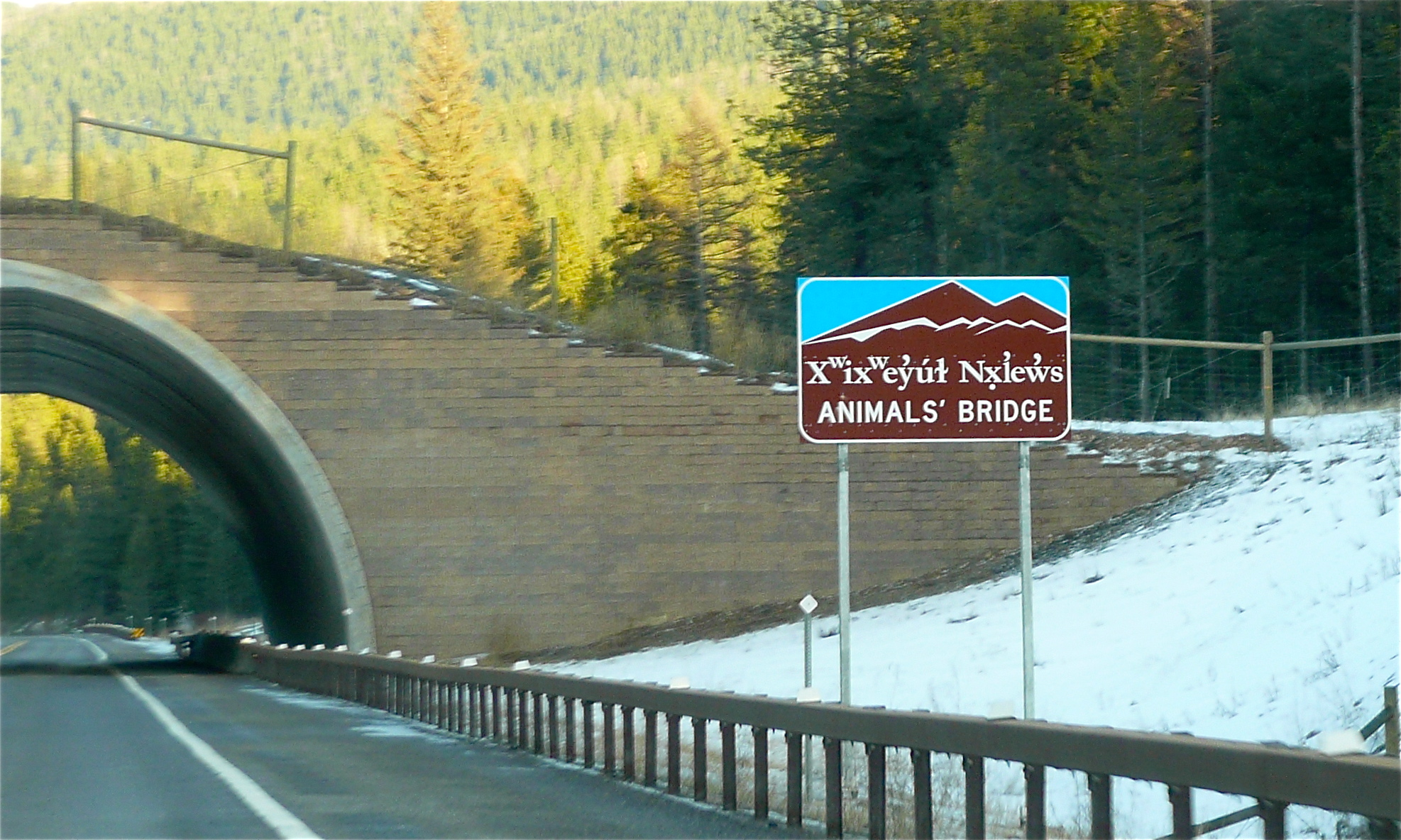
"Animals' Bridge", on the Flathead Indian Reservation in Montana, used by grizzly and black bears, deer, elk, mountain lions, and others

Wildlife crossings are structural passages beneath or above roadways that are designed to facilitate safe wildlife movement across roadways. In recent years, conservation biologists and wildlife managers have advocated wildlife crossings coupled with roadside fencing as a way to increase road permeability and habitat connectivity while decreasing wildlife-vehicle collisions. Wildlife crossing is the umbrella term encompassing underpasses, overpasses, ecoducts, green bridges, amphibian/small mammal tunnels, and wildlife viaducts (Bank et al. 2002). All of these structures are designed to provide semi-natural corridors above and below roads so that animals can safely cross without endangering themselves and motorists.

== History ==
Written reports of rough fish ladders date to 17th-century France, where bundles of branches were used to create steps in steep channels to bypass obstructions. A version was patented in 1837 by Richard McFarlan of Bathurst, New Brunswick, Canada, who designed a fishway to bypass a dam at his water-powered lumber mill. In 1880, the first fish ladder was built in Rhode Island, United States, on the Pawtuxet Falls Dam. As the Industrial Age advanced, dams and other river obstructions became larger and more common, leading to the need for effective fish by-passes.

The first overland wildlife crossings were constructed in France during the 1950s. European countries including the Netherlands, Switzerland, Germany, and France have been using various crossing structures to reduce the conflict between wildlife and roads for several decades and use a variety of overpasses and underpasses to protect and re-establish wildlife such as: amphibians, badgers, ungulates, invertebrates, and other small mammals.

The Humane Society of the United States reported in 2007 that more than 600 tunnels installed under major and minor roads in the Netherlands have helped to substantially increase population levels of the endangered European badger. The longest "ecoduct" overpass, Natuurbrug Zanderij Crailoo, in the Netherlands, runs 800 meters (2,600 ft) and spans a highway, railway and golf course.

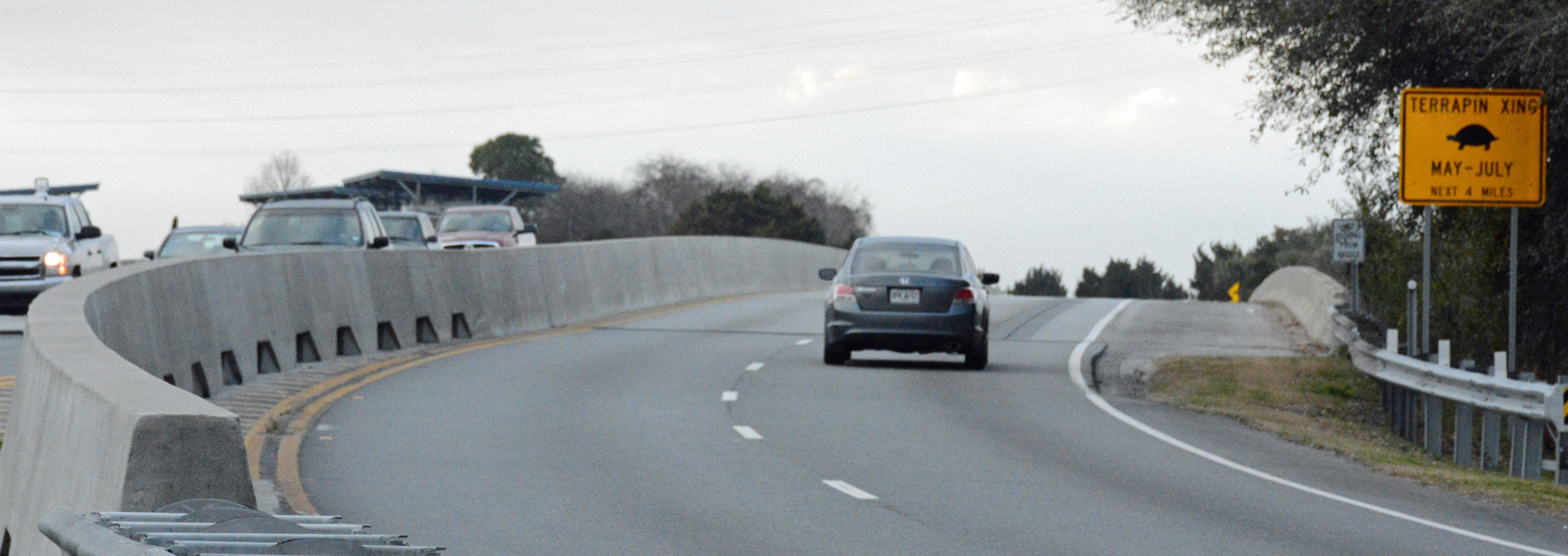
A terrapin crossing sign and a highway barrier designed for crossing at the end of the F.J. Torras causeway at St. Simons Island, Georgia, US (2015)

Wildlife crossings are becoming increasingly common in Canada and the United States. Recognizable wildlife crossings are found in Banff National Park in Alberta, where vegetated overpasses provide safe passage over the Trans-Canada Highway for bears, moose, deer, wolves, elk, and many other species. The 24 wildlife crossings in Banff were constructed as part of a road improvement project in 1978. In the United States, thousands of wildlife crossings have been built in the past 30 years, including culverts, bridges, and overpasses. These have been used to protect mountain goats in Montana, spotted salamanders in Massachusetts, bighorn sheep in Colorado, desert tortoises in California, and endangered Florida panthers in Florida. The Henry Street salamander tunnels are tunnels under Henry Street in North Amherst, Massachusetts: they help salamanders cross Henry Street to get to vernal pools that the salamanders use for breeding.

The first wildlife crossing in the Canadian province of Ontario was built in 2010, along Ontario Highway 69 between Sudbury and Killarney, as part of the route's ongoing freeway conversion.

== Costs and benefits ==
The benefits derived from constructing wildlife crossings to extend wildlife migration corridors over and under major roads appear to outweigh the costs of construction and maintenance. One study estimates that adding wildlife crossings to a road project is a 7–8% increase in the total cost of the project (Bank et al. 2002). Theoretically, the monetary costs associated with constructing and maintaining wildlife crossings in ecologically important areas are trumped by the benefits associated with protecting wildlife populations, reducing property damage to vehicles, and saving the lives of drivers and passengers by reducing the number of collisions caused by wildlife.

A study completed for the Virginia Department of Transportation estimated that underpasses for wildlife become cost effective, in terms of property damage, when they prevent between 2.6 and 9.2 deer-vehicle collisions per year, depending on the cost of the underpass. Approximately 300 deer crossed through the underpasses in the year the study took place (Donaldson 2005).

Seven aerial bridges installed by the Reconecta project in Alta Floresta Brazil cost about $3,000 in materials each, last 20 years, are used by an average of 12 animals per day, and prevent an average of one animal road death per day. The authors did not estimate the assembly or installation costs or value of 7,000 averted collisions over the 20 years.

== Effectiveness ==
A number of studies have been conducted to determine the effectiveness of wildlife corridors at providing habitat connectivity (by providing viable migration corridors) and reducing wildlife-vehicle collisions. The effectiveness of these structures appears to be highly site-specific (due to differences in location, structure, species, habitat, etc.), and also dependent on design, but crossings have been beneficial to a number of species in a variety of locations.

== Examples ==
=== Banff National Park ===
Banff National Park offers one of the best opportunities to study the effectiveness of wildlife crossings because the park contains a wide variety of species and is bisected by the Trans-Canada Highway (TCH), a large commercial road. To reduce the effects of the four-lane TCH, 24 wildlife crossings (22 underpasses and two overpasses) were built to ensure habitat connectivity and protect motorists (Clevenger 2007). In 1996, Parks Canada developed a contract with university researchers to assess the effectiveness of the crossings. Subsequently, a number of publications have analyzed the crossings' effect on various species and overall wildlife mortality (see Clevenger & Waltho 2000, Clevenger et al. 2001, and Clevenger 2007).

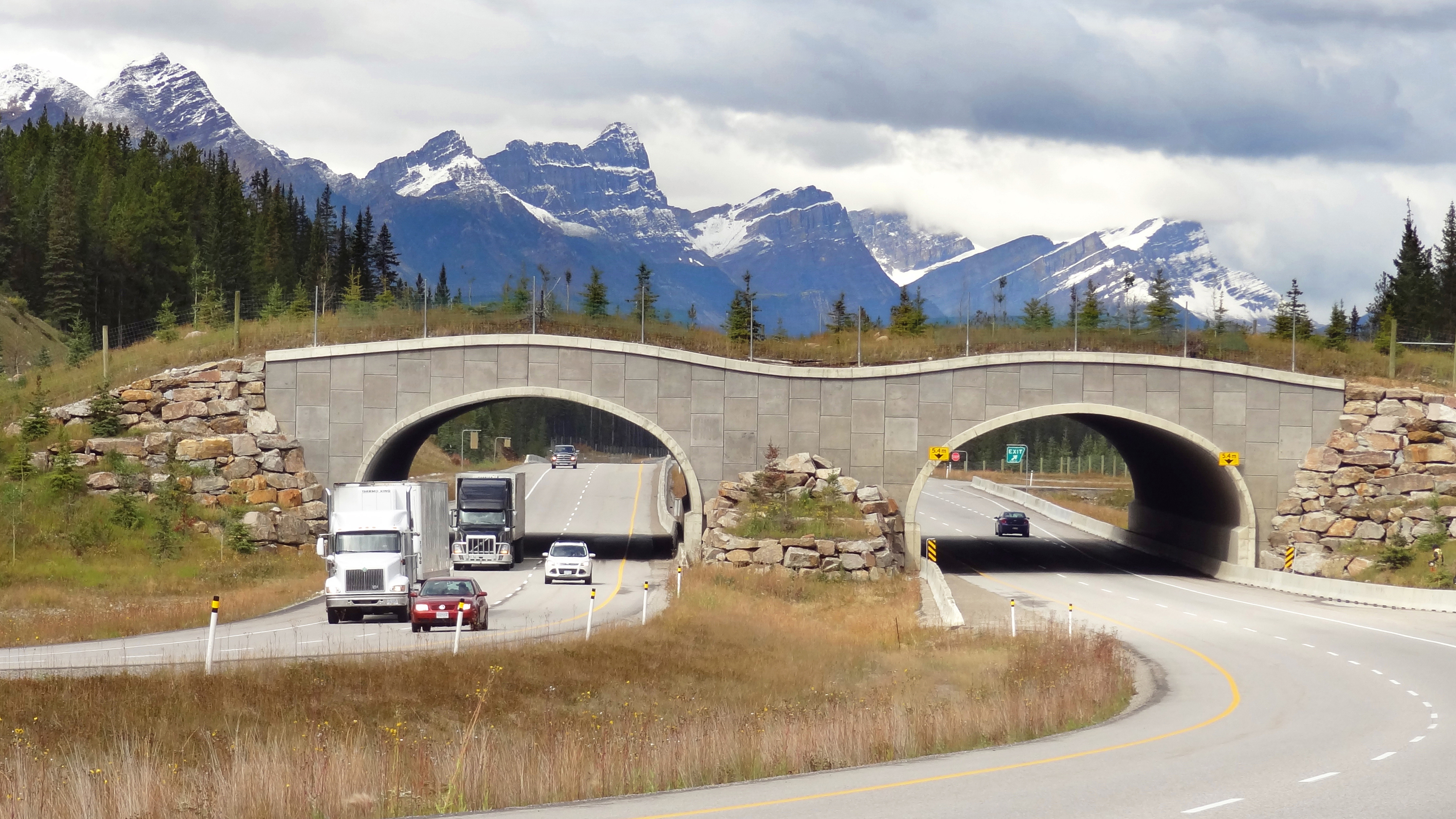
Wildlife overpass on Trans-Canada Highway in Banff National Park

Using a variety of techniques to monitor the crossings since the early 1980s, scientists report that 10 species of large mammals (including deer, elk, black bear, grizzly bear, mountain lion, wolf, moose, and coyote) have used the 24 crossings in Banff a total of 84,000 times as of January 2007 (Clevenger 2007). The research also identified a "learning curve" such that animals need time to acclimate to the structures before they feel comfortable using them. For example, grizzly bear crossings increased from seven in 1996 to more than 100 in 2006, although the actual number of individual bears using the structures remained constant over this time at between two and four bears (Parks Canada, unpublished results). A similar set of observations was made for wolves, with crossings increasing from two to approximately 140 over the same 10-year period. However, in this case the actual number of wolves in the packs using the crossings increased dramatically, from a low of two up to a high of over 20 individuals.

Clevenger et al. (2001) reported that the use of wildlife crossings and fencing reduced traffic-induced mortality of large ungulates on the TCH by more than 80 percent. Recent analysis for carnivores showed results were not as positive however, with bear mortality increasing by an average of 116 percent in direct parallel to an equal doubling of traffic volumes on the highway, clearly showing no effect of fencing to reduce bear mortality (Hallstrom, Clevenger, Maher and Whittington, in prep). Research on the crossings in Banff has thus shown mixed value of wildlife crossings depending on the species in question.

Parks Canada is currently planning to build 17 additional crossing structures across the TCH to increase driver safety near the hamlet of Lake Louise. Lack of effectiveness of standard fencing in reducing bear mortality demonstrates that additional measures such as wire 'T-caps' on the fence may be needed for fencing to mitigate effectively for bears (Hallstrom, Clevenger, Maher and Whittington, in prep).

=== Collier and Lee Counties in Florida ===
Twenty-four wildlife crossings (highway underpasses) and 12 bridges modified for wildlife have been constructed along a 40-mile stretch of Interstate 75 in Collier and Lee Counties in Florida (Scott 2007). These crossings are specifically designed to target and protect the endangered Florida panther, a subspecies of cougar found in the Southeastern United States. Scientists estimate that there are only 80–100 Florida panthers alive in the wild, which makes them one of the most endangered large mammals in North America (Foster & Humphrey 1995). The Florida panther is particularly vulnerable to wildlife-vehicle collisions, which claimed 11 panthers in 2006 and 14 in 2007 (Scott 2007).

The Florida Fish and Wildlife Conservation Commission (FWC) has used a number of mitigation tools in an effort to protect Florida panthers and the combination of wildlife crossings and fences have proven the most effective (Scott 2007). As of 2007, no panthers have been killed in areas equipped with continuous fencing and wildlife crossings and the FWC is planning to construct many more crossing structures in the future. The underpasses on I-75 also appeared to benefit bobcats, deer, and raccoons by significantly reducing wildlife-vehicle collisions along the interstate (Foster & Humphrey 1995).

=== Southern California ===
Wildlife crossings have also been important for protecting biodiversity in several areas of southern California. In San Bernardino County, biologists have erected fences along State Route 58 to complement underpasses (culverts) that are being used by the threatened desert tortoise. Tortoise deaths on the highway declined by 93% during the first four years after the introduction of the fences, proving that even makeshift wildlife crossings (storm-drainage culverts in this case) have the ability to increase highway permeability and protect sensitive species (Chilson 2003). Studies by Haas (2000) and Lyren (2001) report that underpasses in Orange, Riverside, and Los Angeles Counties have drawn significant use from a variety of species including bobcats, coyotes, gray fox, mule deer, and long-tailed weasels. These results could be extremely important for wildlife conservation efforts in the region's Puente Hills and Chino Hills links, which have been increasingly fragmented by road construction (Haas 2000). Los Angeles County's first wildlife-purpose built underpass is at Harbor Boulevard. It was built in partnership between Los Angeles County, California State Parks and the Puente Hills Habitat Preservation Authority.

The Wallis Annenberg Wildlife Crossing in Agoura Hills, California, will be the world's largest wildlife crossing once completed in 2026.

=== Ecoducts, Netherlands ===
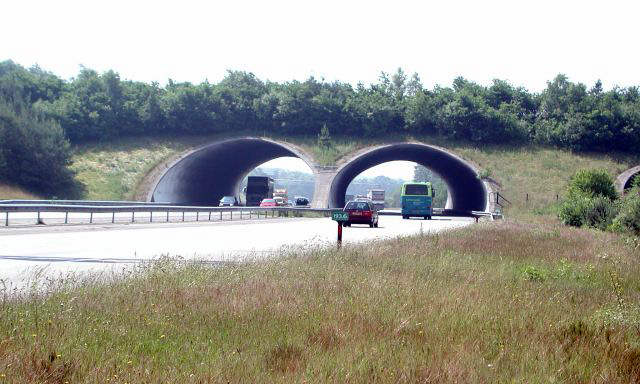
One of the two wildlife crossings spanning the A50 highway on the Veluwe in the Netherlands

The Netherlands has over 66 wildlife crossings (overpasses and ecoducts) that have been used to protect the endangered European badger, as well as populations of wild boar, red deer, and roe deer. As of 2012, the Veluwe, 1,000 square kilometers (390 mi^{2}) of woods, heathland and drifting sands, the largest lowland nature area in North Western Europe, contains nine ecoducts, 50 meters (160 ft) wide on average, that are used to shuttle wildlife across highways that transect the Veluwe. The first two ecoducts on the Veluwe were built in 1988 across the A50 when the highway was constructed. Five of the other ecoducts on the Veluwe were built across existing highways, one was built across a two lane provincial road. The two ecoducts across the A50 were used by nearly 5,000 deer and wild boar during a one-year period (Bank et al. 2002).

The Netherlands also boasts the world's longest ecoduct-wildlife overpass called the Natuurbrug Zanderij Crailoo (sand quarry nature bridge at Crailo) (Danby 2004). The massive structure, completed in 2006, is 50 meters (160 ft) wide and over 800 meters (2,600 ft) long and spans a railway line, business park, roadway, and sports complex (Danby 2004). Monitoring is currently underway to examine the effectiveness of this innovative project combining wildlife protection with urban development. The oldest wildlife passage is Zeist West - A 28, opened in 1988.

=== Slaty Creek Wildlife Underpass, Calder Freeway, Black Forest, Australia ===
Another case study of the effectiveness of wildlife crossings comes from an underpass built to minimize the ecological effect of the Calder Freeway as it travels through the Black Forest in Victoria, Australia. In 1997, the Victorian Government Roads Corporation built Slaty Creek wildlife underpass at a cost of $3 million (Abson & Lawrence 2003). Scientists used 14 different techniques to monitor the underpass for 12 months in order to determine the abundance and diversity of species using the underpass (Abson & Lawrence 2003). During the 12-month period, 79 species of fauna were detected in the underpass (compared with 116 species detected in the surrounding forest) including amphibians, bats, birds, koalas, wombats, gliders, reptiles, and kangaroos (Abson & Lawrence 2003). The results indicate that the underpass could be useful to a wide array of species but the authors suggest that Slaty Creek could be improved by enhanced design and maintenance of fencing to minimise road kill along the Calder Freeway and by attempting to exclude introduced predators such as cats and foxes from the area.

=== I-70 Vail Pass, Colorado ===
In 2005, area environmental groups floated the idea of a wildlife overpass west of Vail Pass. In 2010, ARC Solutions – an interdisciplinary partnership – initiated the International Wildlife Crossing Infrastructure Design Competition for a wildlife crossing over Interstate 70 in the high country west of Denver, Colorado; designers had to account for challenges unique to the area, including snow and severe weather, high elevation and steep grades, a six-lane roadway, a bike path, and high traffic volumes, as well as multiple species of wildlife, including lynx.

After receiving 36 submissions from nine countries, a jury of international experts in landscape architecture, engineering, architecture, ecology and transportation selected five finalists in November 2010 to further develop their conceptual designs for a wildlife crossing structure. In January 2011, the team led by HNTB with Michael Van Valkenburgh & Associates (New York) were selected as the winners. The design features a single 100 m (328 ft) concrete span across the highway that is planted with a variety of vegetation types, including a pine-tree forest and meadow grasses, to attract different species to cross. A modular precast concrete design means that much of the bridge can be constructed offsite and moved into place.

In late 2020, Summit County Safe Passages released the "I-70 East Vail Pass Wildlife Crossings Feasibility Study" for a wildlife overpass.

=== I-90 near Snoqualmie Pass ===
In 2005, the Washington State Department of Transportation received approval to begin a 15-mile (24 km) safety improvement project through the Snoqualmie Pass area along the Interstate 90 corridor from Hyak to Easton, through the Central Cascades and Mountains to Sound Greenway National Heritage Area, including a series of wildlife crossings. Wildlife habitat on either side of I-90 will be reconnected with the installation of new bridges and culverts, protecting both wildlife and the traveling public. The construction of the wildlife overcrossing began in 2015 and was completed in late 2019. Work to restore habitat on the wildlife bridge over I-90 has continued throughout 2020, with 90,000 trees and shrubs planted on the overcrossing.

=== Interstate 80 in Parleys Canyon ===
In 2018, the Utah Department of Transportation announced a wildlife crossing over Interstate 80 in Parleys Canyon. The project was completed in early 2019 and measures 110 meters (350 ft) long by 15 meters (50 ft) wide. It is currently the only wildlife overpass in the state, though Utah has more than 50 wildlife underpasses.

=== Robert L.B. Tobin Land Bridge ===
On December 11, 2020, the Robert L.B. Tobin Land Bridge opened over Wurzbach Parkway in San Antonio, Texas' Phil Hardberger Park. The project cost $23 million and is designed for both wildlife and pedestrians. Construction began on November 26, 2018, originally expected to end in April 2020, and opened in December 2020. At 58 meters (189 ft) long and 46 meters (150 ft) wide, it was the largest wildlife bridge in the United States when it was constructed.

=== Canopy Bridge in Anamalai Tiger Reserve ===
Many endangered lion-tailed macaques used to be killed while crossing the highway at Puduthotam in Valparai, Tamil Nadu. Thanks to the efforts of NGOs and the forest department, several canopy bridges were installed, connecting trees on either side of the road. This helped to lower the numbers of lion-tailed macaques killed in the region. The Environment Conservation Group had initiated a national mission to increase awareness on the importance of adopting roadkill mitigation methods through their mission PATH traveling more than 17,000 kilometers (11,000 miles) across 22 states.

== See also ==
- Colored walls or corridors
  - Aquatic organism passage
  - Emerald network
  - Wildlife corridor, green corridor
- Animal passages
  - Amphibian and reptile tunnel
  - Bat bridge
  - Squirrel bridge
  - Toad tunnel
- Ecological network
  - Habitat destruction
  - Rewilding
  - Landscape connectivity

== Bibliography ==
- Abson, R. N.; Lawrence, R.E. (2003). Monitoring the use of the Slaty Creek Wildlife Underpass, Calder Freeway, Black Forest, Macedon, Victoria, Australia (PDF). Proceedings of the 2003 International Conference on Ecology and Transportation. Lake Placid, NY. pp. 303–308. Archived from the original (PDF) on March 4, 2016.
- Bank, F. G.; C. L. Irwin; G. L. Evink; M. E. Gray; S. Hagood; J. R. Kinar; A. Levy; D. Paulson; B. Ruediger; R. M. Sauvajot; D. J. Scott; P. White (2002). Wildlife habitat connectivity across European highways (Report). U. S. Department of Transportation: Federal Highway Administration. pp. 1–45.
- Beier, P.; Noss, R. F. (1998). "Do habitat corridors provide connectivity?". Conservation Biology. 12 (6): 1241–1252. Bibcode:1998ConBi..12.1241B. doi:10.1111/j.1523-1739.1998.98036.x. S2CID 16770640.
- Bennett, A. F. (1991), "Roads, roadsides, and wildlife conservation: A review", Nature Conservation 2: The Role of Corridors: 99–118
- Bruinderink, G. W. T. A.; Hazebroek, E. (1996). "Ungulate traffic collisions in Europe". Conservation Biology. 10 (4): 1059–1067. Bibcode:1996ConBi..10.1059B. doi:10.1046/j.1523-1739.1996.10041059.x.
- Chilson, P. (June 2003). "Cutting Edge: Right of way". Audubon. Archived from the original on July 22, 2012.
- Clevenger, A. P.; Waltho, N. (2000). "Factors influencing the effectiveness of wildlife underpasses in Banff National Park, Alberta, Canada". Conservation Biology. 14 (1): 47–56. Bibcode:2000ConBi..14...47C. doi:10.1046/j.1523-1739.2000.00099-085.x. S2CID 86501512.
- Clevenger, A. P.; Chruszcz, B.; Gunson, K. E. (2001). "Highway mitigation fencing reduces wildlife-vehicle collisions" (PDF). Wildlife Society Bulletin. 29: 646–653.
- Clevenger, T. (2007). "Highways through habitats: The Banff Wildlife Crossings Project" (PDF). Transportation Research News. 249: 14–17.
- Danby, D. (2004). "A Green Latticework". Worldchanging.com. Archived from the original on July 28, 2012.
- Donaldson, B. M. (2005). The Use of Highway Underpasses by Large Mammals in Virginia and Factors Influencing their Effectiveness (PDF) (Report).
- Forman, R. T. T. (2000). "Estimate of the Area Affected Ecologically by the Road System in the United States" (PDF). Conservation Biology. 14 (1): 31–35. Bibcode:2000ConBi..14...31F. doi:10.1046/j.1523-1739.2000.99299.x. JSTOR 2641901. S2CID 84776602. Archived (PDF) from the original on September 21, 2020 – via the United States Fish and Wildlife Service.
- Foster, M. L.; Humphrey, S. R. (1995). "Use of highway underpasses by Florida panthers and other wildlife". Wildlife Society Bulletin. 23 (1): 95–100. JSTOR 3783202.
- Haas, C. D. (2000). Distribution, relative abundance, and roadway underpass responses of carnivores throughout the Puente-Chino Hills (Master Thesis). California State Polytechnic University. hdl:10211.3/115604.
- Hallstrom, W., A. P. Clevenger, A. Maher and J Whittington. 2008. Effectiveness of highway mitigation fencing for ungulates and carnivores. Journal of Applied Ecology - In Review.
- Heidt, Amanda (September 8, 2023), 'Crossings' explores the science of road ecology, Science News.
- Jaeger, J. A. G.; J. Bowman; J. Brennan; L. Fahrig; D. Bert; J. Bouchard; N. Charbonneau; K. Frank; B. Gruber; K. Tluk von Toschanowitz (2005). "Predicting when animal populations are at risk from roads: an interactive model of road avoidance behavior" (PDF). Ecological Modelling. 185 (2–4): 329–348. Bibcode:2005EcMod.185..329J. doi:10.1016/j.ecolmodel.2004.12.015.
- Knapp, K. K.; Yi, X.; Oakasa, T.; Thimm, W.; Hudson, E.; Rathmann, C. (2004). Deer-vehicle crash coutermeasure toolbox: A decision and choice resource (PDF) (Report). Wisconsin Department of Transportation, Madison.
- Lyren, L. M. (2001). Movement patterns of coyotes and bobcats relative to road underpasses in Chino Hills of southern California (Master Thesis). California State Polytechnic University.
- Primack, R. B. (2006). "Ch. 9: Habitat Destruction". Essentials of Conservation Biology. Sinauer Associates. pp. 189–193.
- Reed, R. A.; Johnson-Barnhard, J.; Baker, W. L. (1996). "Contribution of roads to forest fragmentation in the Rocky Mountains". Conservation Biology. 10 (4): 1098–1106. Bibcode:1996ConBi..10.1098R. doi:10.1046/j.1523-1739.1996.10041098.x.
- Rich, A. S.; Dobkin, D. S.; Niles, L. J. (1994). "Defining forest fragmentation by corridor width: The influence of narrow forest-dividing corridors on forest-nesting birds in Southern New Jersey". Conservation Biology. 8 (4): 1109–1121. Bibcode:1994ConBi...8.1109R. doi:10.1046/j.1523-1739.1994.08041109.x.
- Scott, B. (2007), Florida panther deaths increase from collisions with vehicles, Florida Fish and Wildlife Conservation Commission, archived from the original on May 10, 2008
- Spellerberg, I. F. (1998). "Ecological effects of roads and traffic: A literature review". Global Ecology and Biogeography. 7 (5): 317–333. Bibcode:1998GloEB...7..317S. doi:10.1046/j.1466-822x.1998.00308.x.
