= Hitchcock Center for the Environment =

The Hitchcock Center for the Environment
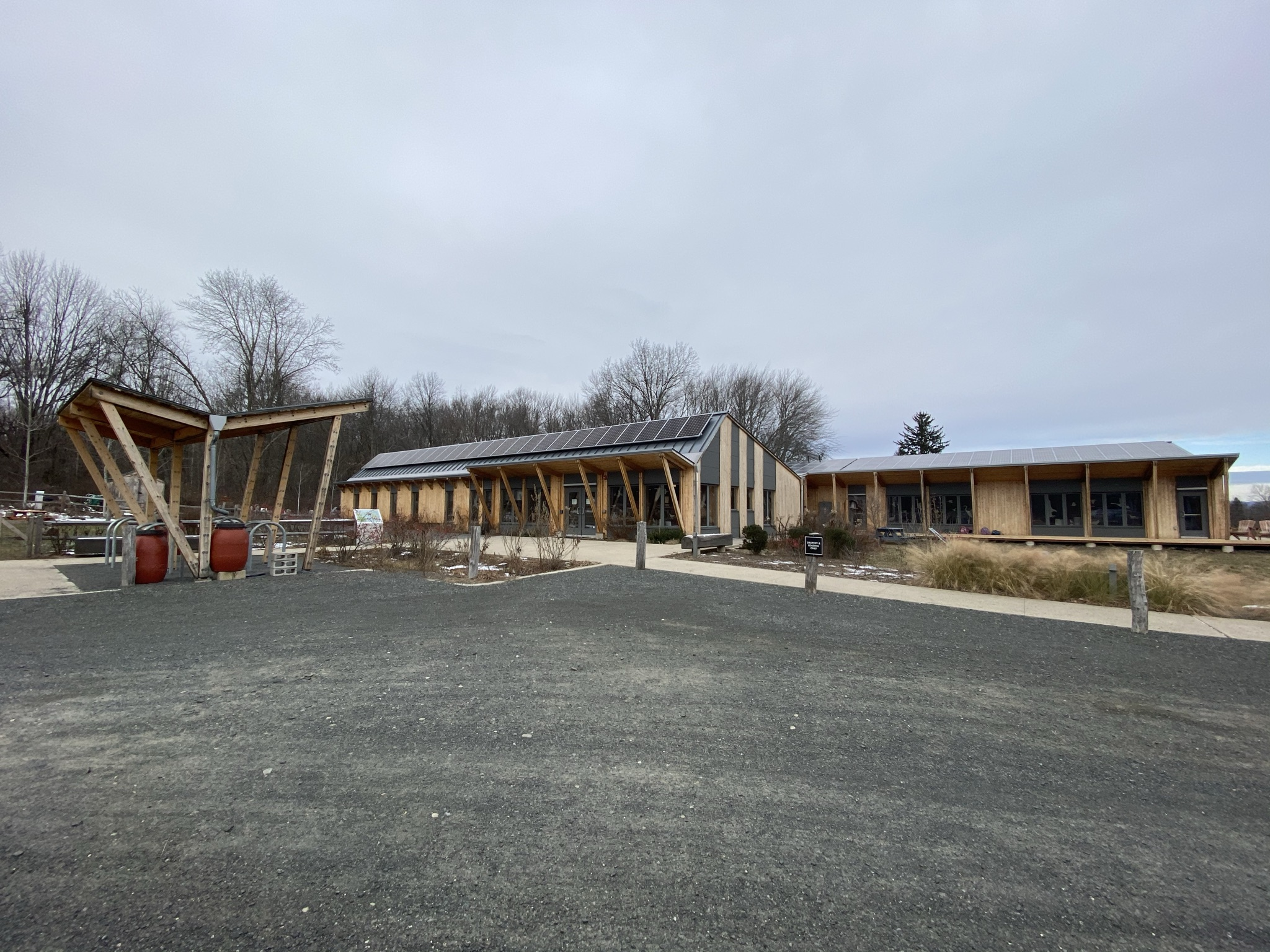
- Front view of Hitchcock Center in 2020

- Location within Massachusetts

General information
- Type: Environmental Education Center
- Location: Amherst, Massachusetts, United States
- Coordinates: 42.3282°N 72.5259°W
- Construction started: 2015
- Completed: 2016
- Cost: US$5.8 million
- Owner: The Hitchcock Center for the Environment

Technical details
- Floor count: 1
- Floor area: 8,950 sq ft (831 m^{2})
- Lifts/elevators: 0

Design and construction
- Architect: designLAB Architects
- Main contractor: Wright Builders

The Hitchcock Center for the Environment is located on the campus of Hampshire College in Amherst, Massachusetts. In 2019 the Hitchcock Center became the second building on Hampshire's campus to earn the Certified Living Building Award from the International Living Future Institute, and just the 23rd building in the world to complete the Living Building Challenge. The 9,000 sq ft (840 m^{2}) living building is the newest teaching tool for the Hitchcock Center for the Environment, which has been providing educational nature programs and summer camps for children since 1962. The building was intended to help meet the center's quickly growing demand for children's ecological-education programming, however, the building itself has led to large increases in visitation and interest from the general public as well, making the building a valuable educational tool for the entire community. The project was funded by the Building for the Future Campaign, which raised money from: the Kendada Fund, the Commonwealth of Massachusetts, the Massachusetts Department of Energy Resources, the Massachusetts Cultural Facilities Fund, and private donations from the community.

== Background ==
=== Site History ===
The land for the building site is owned by Hampshire College. The land was once used as an apple orchard, however, the topsoil was contaminated by lead-arsenate pesticides used in the past. To remediate this, the topsoil was removed and isolated below the current parking lot, while clean soil was provided by local sources. Landscaping engineers collaborated with the Hitchcock Center to replace invasive and non-local species with native landscaping for children and adults to learn about, including bird and pollinator gardens as well as wetland gardens and woodlands.

=== Living Building Challenge ===
The Living Building Challenge is a building certification system designed to promote the design, construction, and operation of buildings which are net-zero-energy, able to supply their own water, and built with sustainable, healthy materials. Beginning in 2017, The Hitchcock Center was audited by a third party and monitored for a 12-month period to certify that it met the standards of the Living Building Challenge Version 2.1. The challenge has seven categories that are referred to as petals, including Place, Water, Energy, Health & Happiness, Materials, Equity, and Beauty. The Hitchcock Center was confirmed to meet the expectations of all seven petals, and on May 2, 2019, they joined the short list of institutions able to complete a fully certified Living Building.

== Design and construction ==
=== Energy efficiency and independence ===
The orientation and shape of the building was optimized to take advantage of the Sun's power and charge the building's 60 kW solar photovoltaic array. The sun also provides consistent daylighting and heating for the space, reducing the energy requirements of the building. A Building Management System alerts staff when the outside weather is desirable, and that the windows should be opened to provide indoor comfort. The exterior walls of the building were designed to combat thermal bridging and provide a consistent insulating R value of 39 for the extremely airtight building envelope. Heating, ventilation, and air conditioning (HVAC) systems include highly efficient air source heat pumps and energy recovery ventilation. The Hitchcock Center was Net-Energy Positive during its observation cycle, meaning it was able to provide the surrounding areas with energy on top of powering itself.

=== Water Independence ===
All rainwater is captured by the roof and filtered to provide potable water for the occupants of the building. The first 1/16” of rainwater is separated due to higher impurities (see first flush diverter), while the remainder is treated using sand filtration and Ultraviolet Light. Now-potable water is then stored in the 6,000 US gal (23,000 L; 5,000 imp gal) underground reservoir below the building. All grey water produced by the building is treated through a constructed wetland and returned to the local watershed. The system is highlighted in the heart of the building as a tool to educate about Rainwater harvesting. The Massachusetts's Department of Environmental Protection typically would not allow the use of non-chlorinated drinking water in a public building, however, the use of chlorine would violate the Living Building Challenge's “Red List” of materials. The state required that the Hitchcock Center install a more robust UV treatment system to avoid the required chlorination of the drinking water. Water use requirements are greatly lowered by the composting toilets, as traditional toilets would have been the largest water requirement in the educational facility.

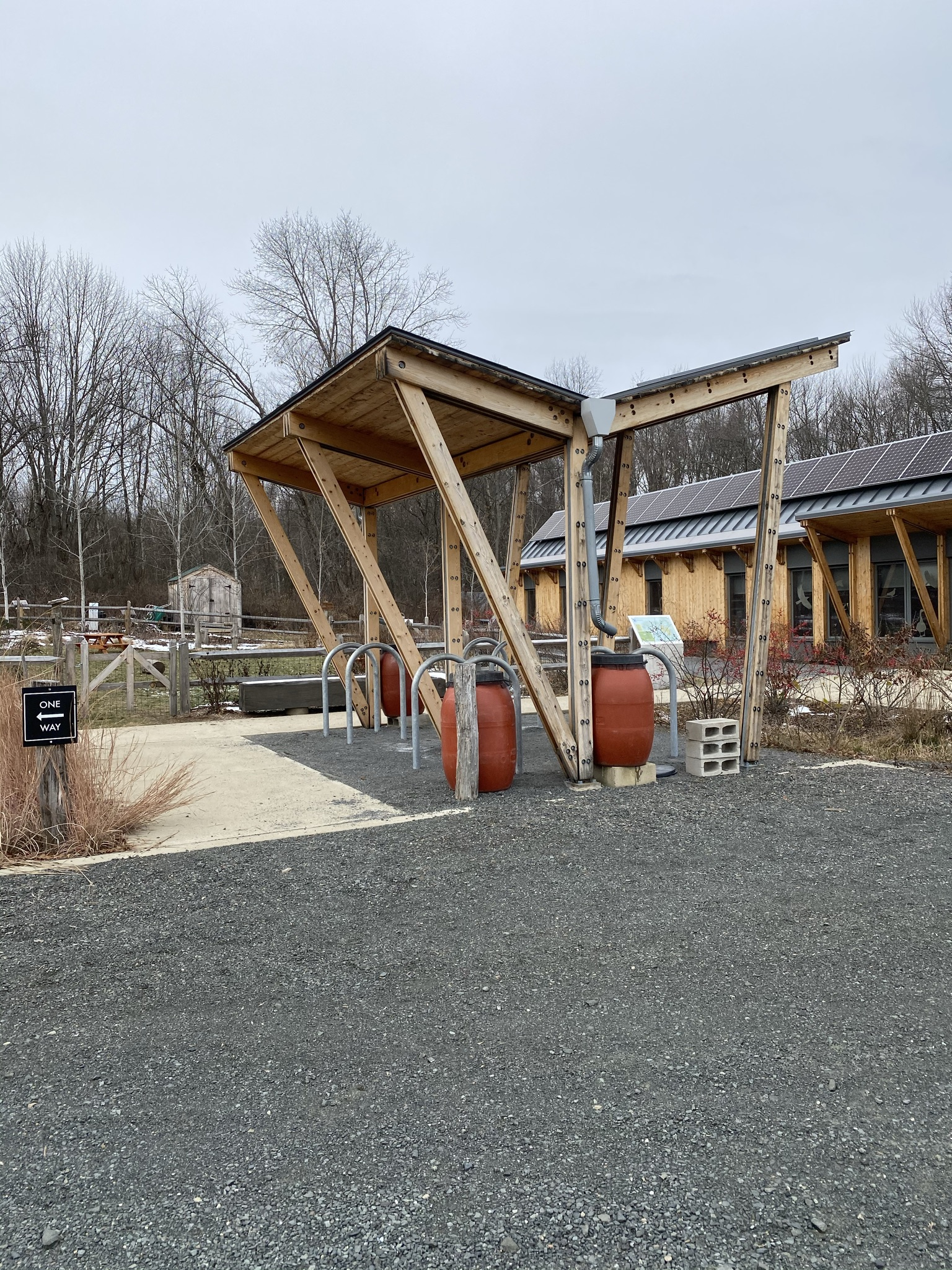
Photograph of bike lock area with a roof designed to capture rainwater for irrigation.

=== Materials ===
The Living Building Challenge Materials petal provided significant challenges to building designers due to the Red List Imperative, which bans the use of any building products containing a red-listed building material. The Hitchcock Center used large amounts of engineered wood in the structural system and a wooden tongue-and-groove sheathing system to wrap the envelope of the building. The goal was to demonstrate carbon sequestration techniques, reduce the carbon footprint of the building, and provide a naturally beautiful exterior as well as interior. Lumber was almost entirely FSC certified, and the structural wood frames were made of locally sourced Black Spruce, Northern Cedar, and Eastern White Pine. Concrete artists from EnnisArt had to change their typical color pigments to a product which did not contain Red List materials in order to complete their depiction of the Connecticut Valley Watershed located in the water-filtration room.

== Use of building ==
=== Education center ===
The Hitchcock Center for the Environment provides environmental education programs to more than 10,000 children and adults each year, with a focus on pre-K to 12th grade education. Education is based on the principal that hands-on experience outside the classroom is as important as what is learned in the classroom. Programs focus on teaching ecological systems and environmental responsibility. The outdoor nature of the programming was proven beneficial during the 2020 COVID-19 pandemic, as students were able to continue learning safely in an outdoor environment.

=== Community resource ===
Being a Net-Energy Positive building with a 6,000 US gal (23,000 L; 5,000 imp gal) reservoir of potable water, the Hitchcock Center is a very resilient and sustainable building to be accessed by the community for educational resources. Located on Hampshire College's campus, the Center provides a direct benefit to the community and is accessible by local transportation services. The natural landscape provides enjoyable outdoor opportunities for all visitors.

=== Henry Street salamander tunnels ===
There are tunnels to assist salamanders in crossing a street in Amherst; they are called the Henry Street salamander tunnels. Some salamanders miss the tunnels and try to cross Henry Street. In 2024 the town of Amherst announced that they would close Henry street for two days (February 28 and 29th, 2024) so that salamanders would not be run over by cars. The town also installed temporary signs to alert drivers. The Hitchcock Center for the Environment partnered with the town to arrange for volunteers to assist salamanders that do not use the salamander tunnels. Many citizens of Amherst and college students come to watch the crossing each year.
