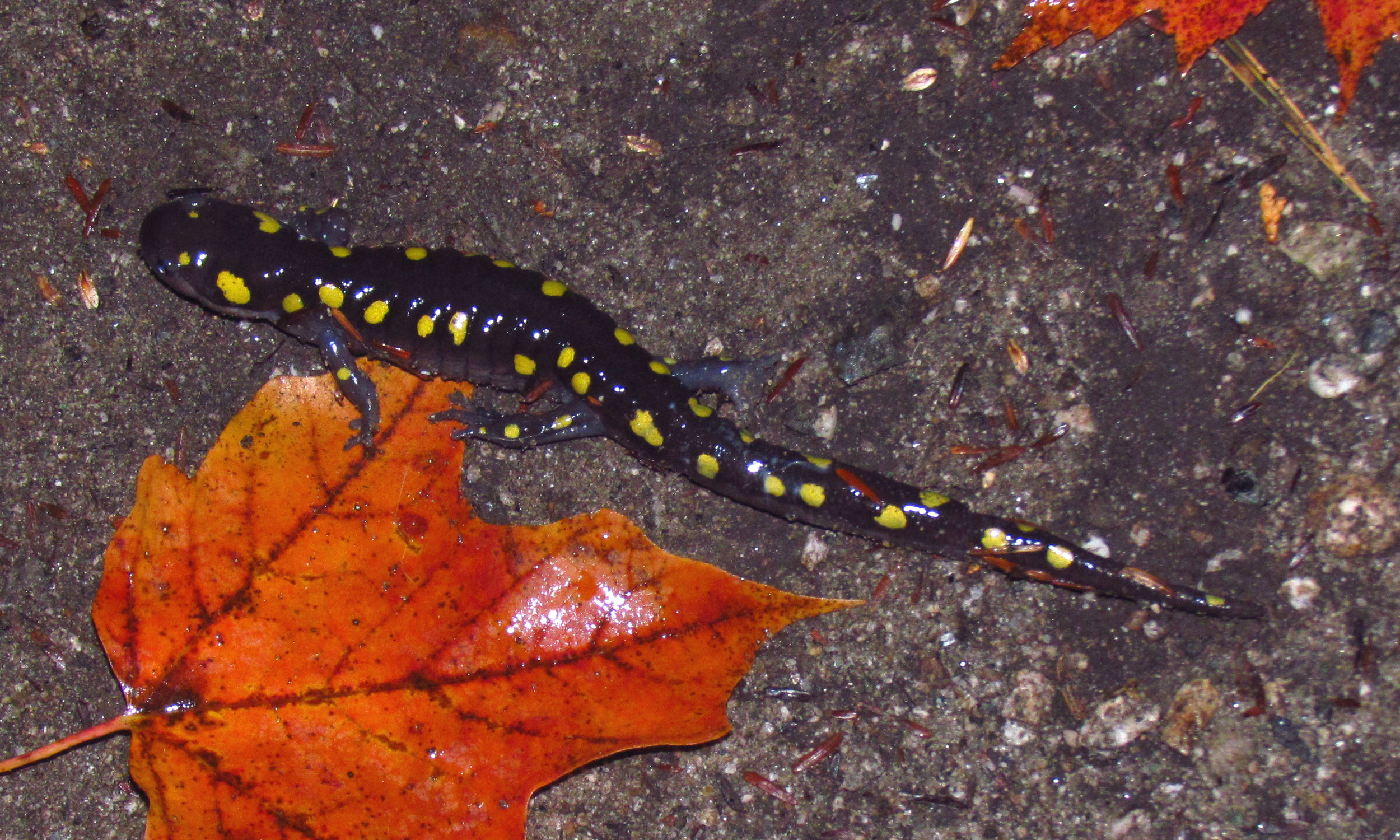

Conservation status
- Least Concern (IUCN 3.1)

Scientific classification
- Kingdom: Animalia
- Phylum: Chordata
- Class: Amphibia
- Order: Urodela
- Family: Ambystomatidae
- Genus: Ambystoma
- Species: A. maculatum

Binomial name
- Ambystoma maculatum (Shaw, 1802)
- Range of A. maculatum

Synonyms
- Salamandra punctata Lacépède, 1788; Salamandra punctata Bonnaterre, 1789; Salamandra palustris Bechstein, 1800; Lacerta maculata Shaw, 1802; Salamandra venenosa Daudin, 1803; Lacerta subviolacea Barton, 1804; Ambystoma carolinae Gray, 1850; Salamandra argus Gray, 1850; Ambystome argus A.M.C. Duméril, Bibron & A.H.A. Duméril, 1854; Salamandra margaritifera A.M.C. Duméril, Bibron & A.H.A. Duméril, 1854

= Spotted salamander =

Species of amphibian

The spotted salamander (Ambystoma maculatum), also known commonly as the yellow-spotted salamander, is a species of mole salamander in the family Ambystomatidae. The species is native to the eastern United States and Canada. It is the state amphibian of Ohio and South Carolina. The species ranges from Nova Scotia, to Lake Superior, to southern Georgia and Texas. Its embryos have been found to have symbiotic algae, Chlorococcum amblystomatis, living in and around them, the only known example of vertebrate cells hosting an endosymbiont microbe (unless mitochondria are considered).

== Description ==
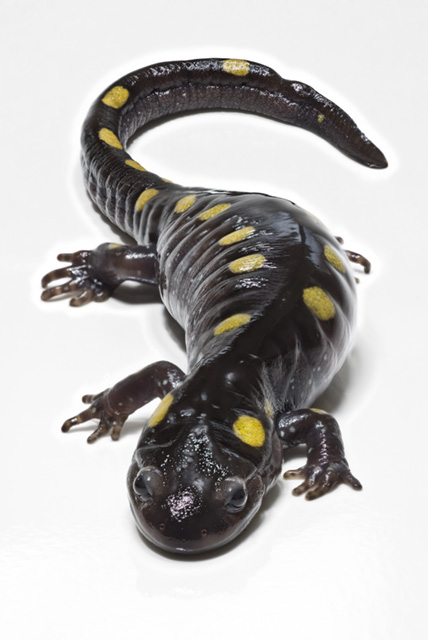

The spotted salamander is about 15–25 cm (5.9–9.8 in) long (tail included), with females generally being larger than males. It is stout, like most mole salamanders, and has a wide snout. The spotted salamander's main color is black, but can sometimes be a bluish-black, dark gray, dark green, or even dark brown. Two uneven rows of yellowish-orange spots run from the top of the head (near the eyes) to the tip of the tail (dorso-lateral ranging). The spotted salamander's spots near the top of its head are more orange, while the spots on the rest of its body are more yellow. The underside of the spotted salamander is slate gray and pink. Sexual dimorphism (physical differences between males and females) is displayed in the form of larger-bodied females having brighter-coloured spots. Males will have a larger portion of the dorsal surface covered in spots that are less bright. There is also a correlation between body condition and spots having lower chroma.

The scientific name Ambystoma maculatum comes from Ambystoma – amblys (Greek) for blunt; -stoma (Greek) meaning mouth; or anabystoma (New Latin) meaning "to cram into the mouth"; maculatum – macula (Latin) for spot; maculosus (Latin) for spotted.

A. maculatum develops a larger tail fin and body to compete with other predators. It typically lives around 20 years, but some have lived up to 30 years.

== Habitat and dispersal ==
The spotted salamander usually lives in mature forests with ponds or ephemeral vernal pools for breeding sites. Vernal pools are suitable breeding sites for these amphibians as they dry often enough to exclude fish that eat the salamander eggs and larvae, while retaining water long enough to allow amphibian larvae to complete development and metamorphose into terrestrial adults. A study showed larger pools (as opposed to smaller pools) had more egg masses, higher occupancy, and higher larval survival rates for spotted salamanders. Outside of the breeding season, these salamanders spend their time in forests with well-drained soils that contain many burrows dug by small mammals. They have also been known to be absent from landscapes and forest with canopy cover below 30%.

Juveniles are the main source of population dispersion. They prefer forest over successional forest over fields. They can detect forest from 10 m away. Early successional forest could be an ecological trap.

Salamander populations from nearby pools form genetically distinct metapopulations. Subpopulations within 4.8 kilometers share a higher proportion of genes, while populations greater than 4.8 kilometers share a smaller proportion of genes. Inter-population dispersal is likely mediated by both species-specific behaviors and natural limitations. Spotted salamanders have significant variation in length and body mass both within and between populations. Variation within a population is typically greater than variation between populations leading to the theory that variation is due to microhabitat and level of heterogeneity rather than genetic distinction.

== Behavior ==
The spotted salamander is fossorial. It rarely comes above ground, except after a rain or for foraging and breeding. During the winter, it brumates underground, and is not seen again until breeding season in early March–May.

In North Amherst, Massachusetts, United States, spotted salamanders cross the street to get from their overwintering sites in the wooded area east of the roadway to their breeding sites to the west. Local officials built amphibian and reptile tunnels called the Henry Street salamander tunnels to help the salamanders cross the road to get to vernal pools. In the spring after rain and when temperatures rise above 40 °F (4 °C), salamanders emerge from underground. They cross Henry Street to get to their breeding grounds, vernal pools which form on the other side of the road, an event common among amphibians and known as the Big Night.

A. maculatum has several methods of defense, including hiding in burrows or leaf litter, autotomy of the tail, and a toxic milky liquid it excretes when perturbed. This secretion comes from large poison glands around the back and neck. The spotted salamander, like other salamanders, shows great regenerative abilities: if a predator manages to dismember a part of a leg, tail, or even parts of the brain, head, or organs, the salamander can grow back a new one, although this takes a massive amount of energy. As juveniles, they spend most of their time under the leaf litter near the bottom of the pools where their eggs were laid. The larvae tend to occupy refuges in vegetation, and lower their activity in the presence of predators.

A. maculatum tend to follow the same path in their migration to and from their burrows and breeding pools. They accomplish their journey in conditions that lack visual cues, since it is usually during periods of cloud cover. Some studies show evidence of landmark learning and use of geotaxis in spotted salamanders. Researchers found that spotted salamanders can associate visual landmarks with food. Thus spotted salamanders may learn landmarks in their habitat that are reliable indicators of resource locations or provide orientation clues for migration to and from breeding ponds.

Male salamanders come out earlier than females due to different responses in temperature than females. According to a study there is a correlation between the salamander's spot coloration and body condition. Salamanders in lower body condition had less color and those with a better body score had brighter colored spots.

=== Diet ===
The spotted salamander preys upon earthworms, slugs, snails, spiders, millipedes, centipedes, insects, algae and other invertebrates. The spotted salamander larvae are aggressive predators, and have been known to cannibalize others when food is scarce. A. maculatum sometimes also eats smaller salamanders, such as the red-backed salamander. The adult spotted salamander uses its sticky tongue to catch food.

== Life cycle ==
During the majority of the year, spotted salamanders live in the shelter of leaves or burrows in deciduous forests. However, when the temperature rises and the moisture level is high, the salamanders make their abrupt migration towards their annual breeding ponds. Recent studies, however, indicate that temperature may be a more important factor than precipitation, as precipitation in winter months increase, yet salamanders do not migrate. In just one night, hundreds to thousands of salamanders may make the trip to their ponds for mating. Males will start a dance-like behavior called a liebsspiel, where afterward they lay down their spermatophore. This dance includes the salamanders circling around one another and putting their head's on one another's tail. Then, the male will swim away wiggling his tail. If the female wants to mate she will follow him to a sperm pack he made earlier. Males will migrate at higher rates than females early in the migration season. This could be due to different responses to temperature between males and females. Mates usually breed in ponds when it is raining in the spring. Females usually lay about 100 eggs in one clutch that cling to the underwater plants and form egg masses.

The egg masses are round, jelly-like clumps that are usually 6.4–10.2 cm (2.5–4 in) long. The spotted salamander produces a unique polymorphism in the outer jelly layers of its egg masses: one morph has a clear appearance and contains a water-soluble protein, whereas the other morph is white and contains a crystalline hydrophobic protein. This polymorphism is thought to confer advantages in vernal pools with varying dissolved nutrient levels, while also reducing mortality from feeding by wood frog larvae.

Adults only stay in the water for a few days, then the eggs hatch in one to two months. When the eggs hatch depends on the water temperatures. Eggs of A. maculatum can have a symbiotic relationship with the green alga Chlorococcum amblystomatis. A dense gelatinous matrix surrounds the eggs and prevents the eggs from drying out, but it inhibits oxygen diffusion (required for embryo development). C. amblystomatis provides increased oxygen and supplemental nutrition from fixed carbon products via photosynthesis and removes the embryo's nitrogenous waste (ammonia) in the egg capsule, aiding in the salamander's embryonic development and growth. The developing salamander thus metabolizes the oxygen, producing carbon dioxide (which then the alga consumes). Photosynthetic algae are present within the egg capsule of the developing salamander embryo, enhancing growth. However, the widely used herbicide, atrazine, has been found to significantly lower hatching success rate by eliminating the symbiotic algae associated with the egg masses. The algae may not be entirely beneficial though. Research has shown that the algae may slow embryo movement and limit the ability to hatch at night. This could make the embryos more vulnerable due to the longer hatch time.

As larvae, they are usually light brown or greenish-yellow. They have small dark spots and are born with external gills. In two to four months, the larvae lose their gills, and become juvenile salamanders that leave the water. Spotted salamanders have been known to live up to 32 years, and normally return to the same vernal pool every year. These pools are seasonal and will usually dry up during the late spring and stay dry until winter.

Spotted salamanders are often preyed on by raccoons, skunks, turtles, snakes and sometimes salmonoid fish. For this reason they perform an important function by connecting the food chain. Moreover, one of their predators is humans since they are popularly sought out through the pet trade.

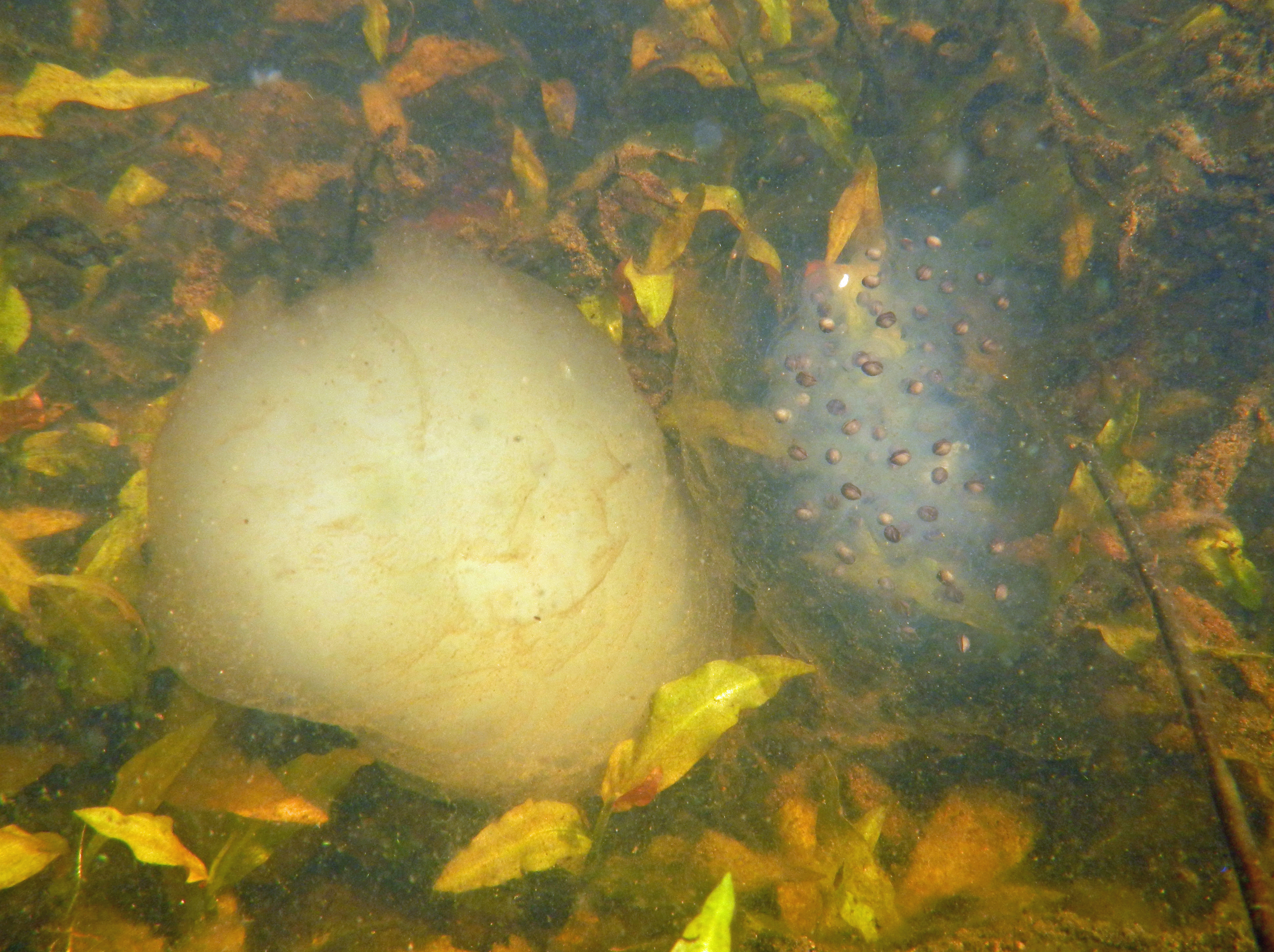
Polymorphic spotted salamander egg masses: white morph (left) and clear morph (right)

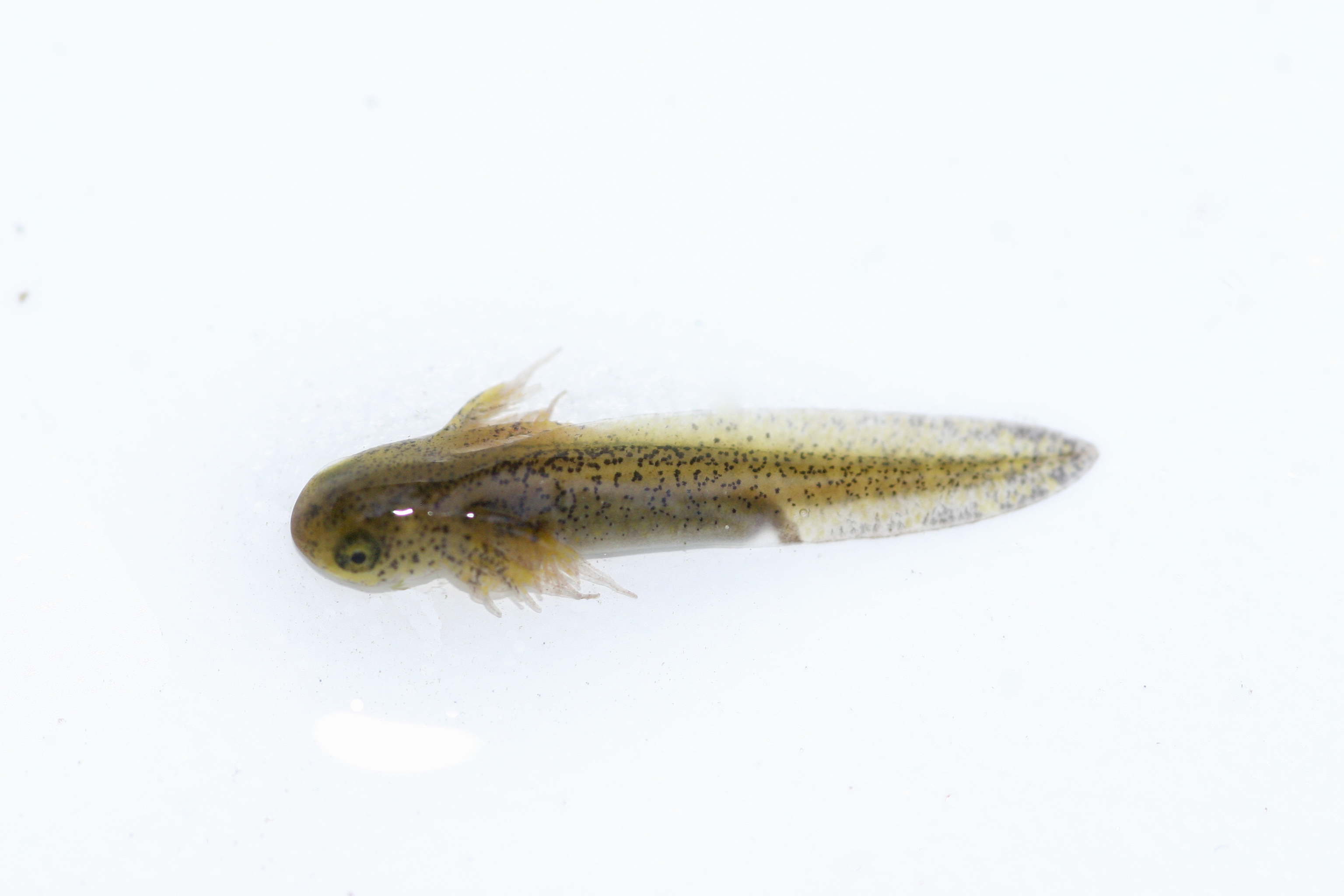
Spotted salamander (Ambystoma maculatum) larva

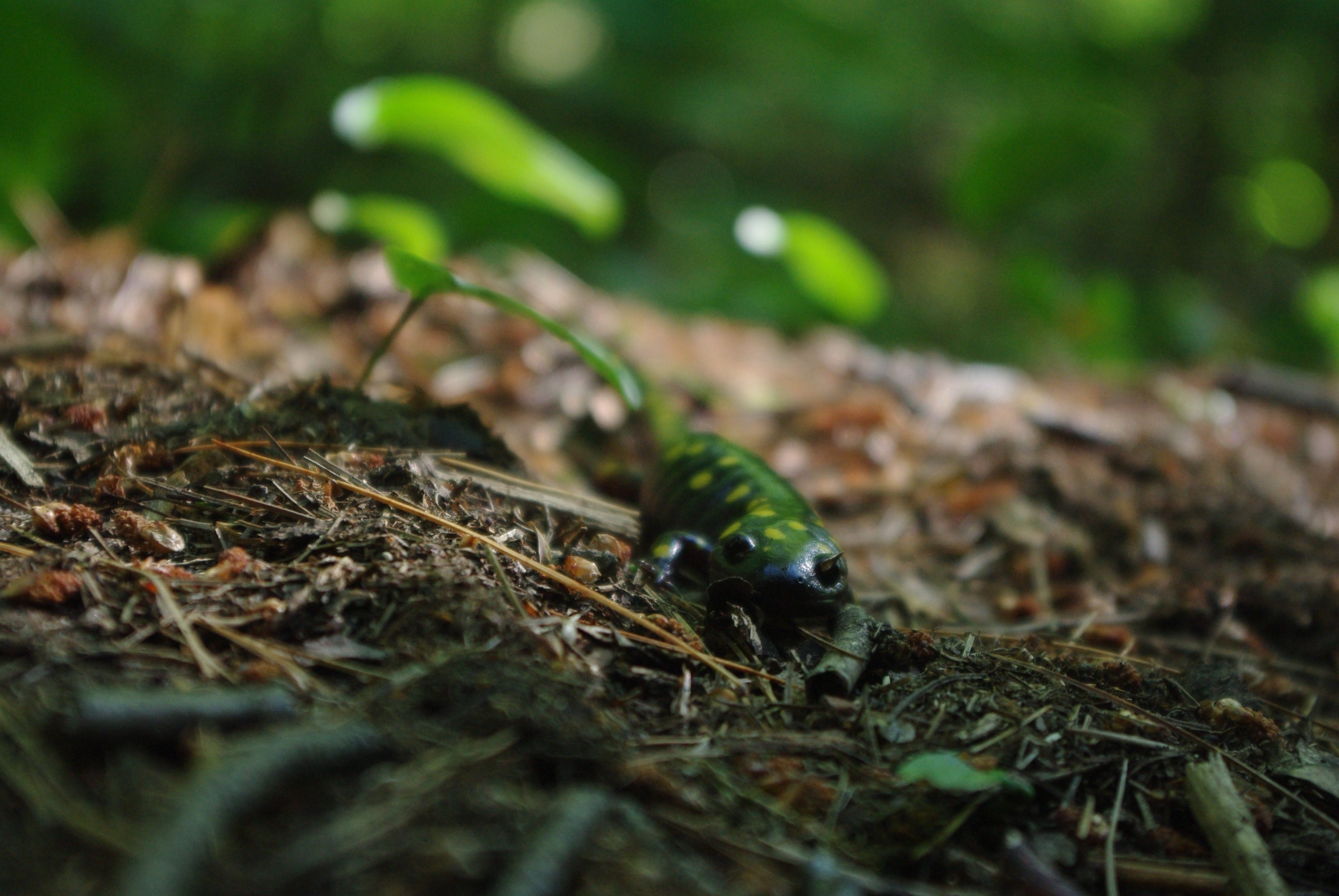
An adult spotted salamander seen crawling on the forest floor in central Ontario.
