= Newt fencing =

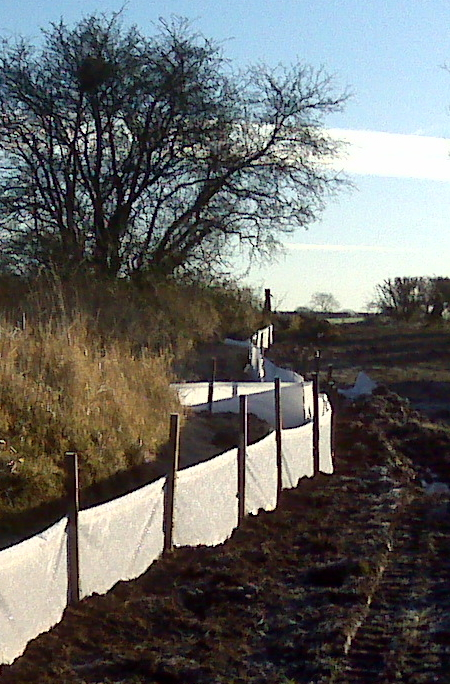
A section of temporary newt fencing to enclose a great crested newt habitat

Newt fencing is a barrier designed to control the movement of great crested newts, other amphibians or reptiles. It can also be called drift fencing or temporary amphibian fencing (TAF). It consists of a low fence of plastic sheeting, buried a short way into the ground and supported by lightweight posts, usually made of wood or plastic. It is used to keep animals out of working areas, to keep them in safe areas of their habitat, to intercept migration routes, or to control their movement to facilitate their capture for translocation. It can be used in conjunction with pitfall traps placed at the base of the fence. It is most commonly used in association with building projects to minimise disturbance to protected species.

== Background ==
=== Legislation ===
The great crested newt (Triturus cristatus) is an amphibian native to the United Kingdom, but is also widespread throughout Northern Europe. While it is relatively common in the UK (in fact the UK hosts one of the most significant populations of the great crested newt), it is rare on a European scale. The great crested newt is listed as a "strictly protected fauna species" under Appendix II of the Convention on the Conservation of European Wildlife and Natural Habitats: and consequently is protected under UK legislation through the Wildlife and Countryside Act and the Conservation (Natural Habitat) regulations 1994. Under these regulations it is an offence to intentionally disturb, injure or kill any great crested newt, or disturb or destroy its habitat. Similarly, the Habitats Regulations 2010 do not apply to all newts, and in the case of the smooth newt for example, they are protected differently, under the Wildlife and Countryside Act 1981 (as amended).

=== Habitat ===
The great crested newt's natural habitat requirements are standing fresh water for breeding purposes, but it spends most of its time on dry land. They prefer semi-natural habitats such as rough grassland, hedgerows and scrub woodland. An individual newt tends to have a home range around its breeding pool. The breeding phase of the life cycle takes place in spring, from February through to April. After this it spends much of its time on land, usually within 200 metres (200 yd) from the breeding pond, but sometimes ranging up to 500 metres (500 yd). Unfortunately this life cycle and their use of both terrestrial and aquatic habitats can bring them into conflict with humans. Brownfield sites often contain very good terrestrial habitat for great crested newts, and land within 500 metres (500 yd) of newt breeding ponds covers a significant proportion of the UK.

=== Planning ===
As part of the planning process for any development, an environmental impact assessment should include an ecological survey, which in turn should identify the potential for loss of habitat and the impact on the local population of great crested newts. If the assessment identifies potential habitat loss or the potential to kill or disturb individual newts, the developer must apply for a licence from the Department for Environment, Food and Rural Affairs for a licence. The licence application should set out what measures will be taken to ensure that the local population is not threatened, and how any potential loss of habitat will be mitigated.

== Fencing and trapping ==
To ensure that individual newts are not injured or killed by development activities, it may be necessary to enclose the site with newt-proof fencing, trap the individuals within the site and/or remove them to a suitable release site. As the great crested newt is a strictly protected species in Europe, a licence is required to erect newt fences or to trap the animals.

=== Construction ===
The newt fence will normally consist of a plastic membrane partially buried in the ground (usually to about 200 mm (8 in)), with the above-ground section supported by wooden posts placed at regular intervals along the line of the fence. The fence will normally have an underground horizontal return facing outwards from the site to minimise the risk of newts re-entering the site through the disturbed soil layer. It will usually have some form of overhang at the top edge to reduce the possibility of newts climbing over the fence.

=== Newt fencing types ===
Fences tend to fall into three basic categories, temporary (less than two years lifespan), semi-permanent (two to five years lifespan) and permanent (greater than two years lifespan). The materials used in their construction tend to vary according to the length of time the fence is intended to remain in use. A temporary fence is normally constructed from UV-stabilised polythene sheeting or woven geotextile. Semi-permanent fences are usually constructed from 1mm thick plastic panels. Permanent fencing is usually constructed from rigid plastic or galvanised steel panels. For temporary fencing materials, the underground return is created by folding the material at a 90° angle along the base of the trench, and the top overhang is created by rolling the top edge of the membrane several times to form a roll. For permanent fencing, the underground return is sometimes omitted and the fence is buried deeper instead (usually 300 mm (10 in)). The top overhang is created by making a fold in the material at the manufacturing stage.

=== Newt collection and trapping ===
Trapping is carried out using buried buckets (pitfall traps) placed alongside the fencing material. The idea is that newts will follow the fence along until they fall into the open bucket. Carpet tiles (terrestrial refuges) can be used in conjunction with pitfall traps. These are also placed along the fence and provide ideal shelter for newts when resting (during the day and during dry or cold periods).

Once an ecologist is satisfied that all of the newts have been captured from the site and that the conditions of the licence have been met, construction work may commence.

== See also ==
- Amphibian and reptile tunnel
