= Squirrel bridge =

Construction for small animals to safely cross roads

Squirrel bridge in Vlotho (2012)

A squirrel bridge is a construction (similar to a wildlife crossing) which enables small animals, especially squirrels and martens, to safely cross busy roadways. The bridges are a measure for wildlife management and natural habitat preservation, and serve the functions of both animal welfare and accident prevention. The Nutty Narrows Bridge in Longview, Washington, built in 1963, is regarded as the first of its kind. The city has since built eight other bridges for squirrels.

Costs to construct squirrel bridges vary significantly, depending on construction. Simple rope bridge constructions, such as those in Brecht, Belgium, have cost only about 250 euros, while the bridge built in The Hague in 2013 took half a year to construct and cost 150,000–200,000 euros.

== List of squirrel bridges ==
The following bridges protect the red squirrel, common in Europe, or the North American gray squirrel (either of which may be hunted as invasive species depending on the continent).

Image	Country	Place	Year	Type/Number	Notes
	United States	Olympia Way near 18th Avenue, Longview, Washington	1963	Suspension bridge	"Nutty Narrows Bridge."
	United States	1318 Kessler Boulevard, Longview, Washington	2011	Covered bridge	"Bruce Kamp Bridge."
	United States	Nichols Boulevard near Kentucky Boulevard, Longview, Washington	2012	Cable-stayed bridge	"John R. Dick Bridge." Modeled after the Leonard P. Zakim Bunker Hill Memorial Bridge in Boston, Massachusetts.
	United States	Louisiana Street near 23rd Avenue, Longview, Washington	2014	Covered bridge	"OBEC Bridge."
	United States	Kessler Boulevard near 24th Avenue, Longview, Washington	2015	Truss bridge	"Safety Awareness Bridge." Designed and built by the Bits and Bots Robotics Club of R. A. Long High School and Mark Morris High School.
	United States	Kessler Boulevard near Washington Way, Longview, Washington		Truss bridge	"R.D. Olson Mfg. Bridge." Modeled after the Lewis and Clark Bridge in Longview, Washington.
	United States	Kessler Boulevard near 20th Avenue, Longview, Washington		Tied-arch bridge	"S & R Bridge." Modeled after the Fremont Bridge (Portland, Oregon).
	United States	Kessler Boulevard near 22nd Avenue, Longview, Washington		Truss bridge	"PUD Bridge."
	Belgium	Brussels, Ring 0	2013	Ropes/nets and steel pipe attached to a gantry	
	Belgium	Brecht, Belgium, Andrélaan	2013	Two rope bridges	
	Belgium	Northeast of Antwerp Province, Belgium	2023	Ropes attached to trees at a height of approximately 10 meters.	16 bridges are installed in Schilde, Schoten, Wijnegem and Deurne. Select positions will be monitored by cameras
	France	La Rochelle, Parc Franck-Delmas/Parc d'Orbigny	2012	Rope bridge	„Écureuilloduc“
	Netherlands	Rijksweg 12, between Ede and interchange Grijsoord	2016	Two rope bridges	
	Netherlands	The Hague, Benoordenhoutseweg	2012		A camera monitoring the bridge suggested that squirrels largely ignored the bridge in a widely reported story in 2016. As of 2022, however, the bridge is regularly used by both squirrels and martens.
	Netherlands	Amsterdam, Europaboulevard in Amstelpark	2011/2012	Parallel ropes connected to netting.	
	Netherlands	Roermond, Heinsbergerweg	2013		
	Germany	Berlin-Friedrichshagen, Müggelseedamm	2014	Rope bridge	
	Germany	Vlotho, Burgstraße	2012	Rope bridge	
	United Kingdom	Scotland, Aberdeen	2008		
	United Kingdom	England, near Formby	2004	Rope bridge	

== Similar concepts for other species ==
Image	Country	Place	Year	Type/Number	Notes
	Australia	Victoria, near Benalla	2007	Rope bridge	For sugar gliders and possums
	Australia	Victoria, Longwood		Rope bridge	For sugar gliders and possums
	Kenya	Diani Beach	1997	about 200, rope ladder construction	"Colobridges", for colobus monkeys

== See also ==
- Bat bridge
- Amphibian and reptile tunnel
