= Bat bridge =

Road construction to aid the navigation of bats

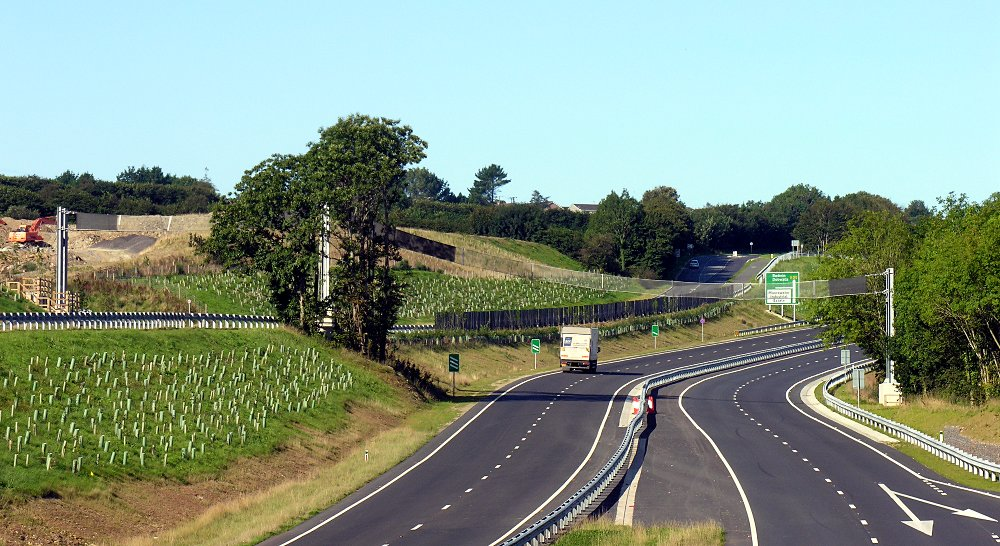
Bat bridge on the A38 Dobwalls Bypass, Cornwall, UK. (2009)

A bat bridge is a structure of varying construction crossing a new or altered road to aid the navigation of bats following the destruction of a hedgerow, and to cause the bats to cross the roadway at a sufficient height to avoid traffic. Bats are thought to follow the lines of hedgerows and woods, and removing these may confuse the bats.

The theory is that these "bridges" will be seen by the bats' sonar as linear features sufficiently similar to the old hedgerows as to provide an adequate substitute. The English Highways Agency is performing a study of those on the Dobwalls bypass to determine if this assumption is justified.

== Usage ==
=== France ===
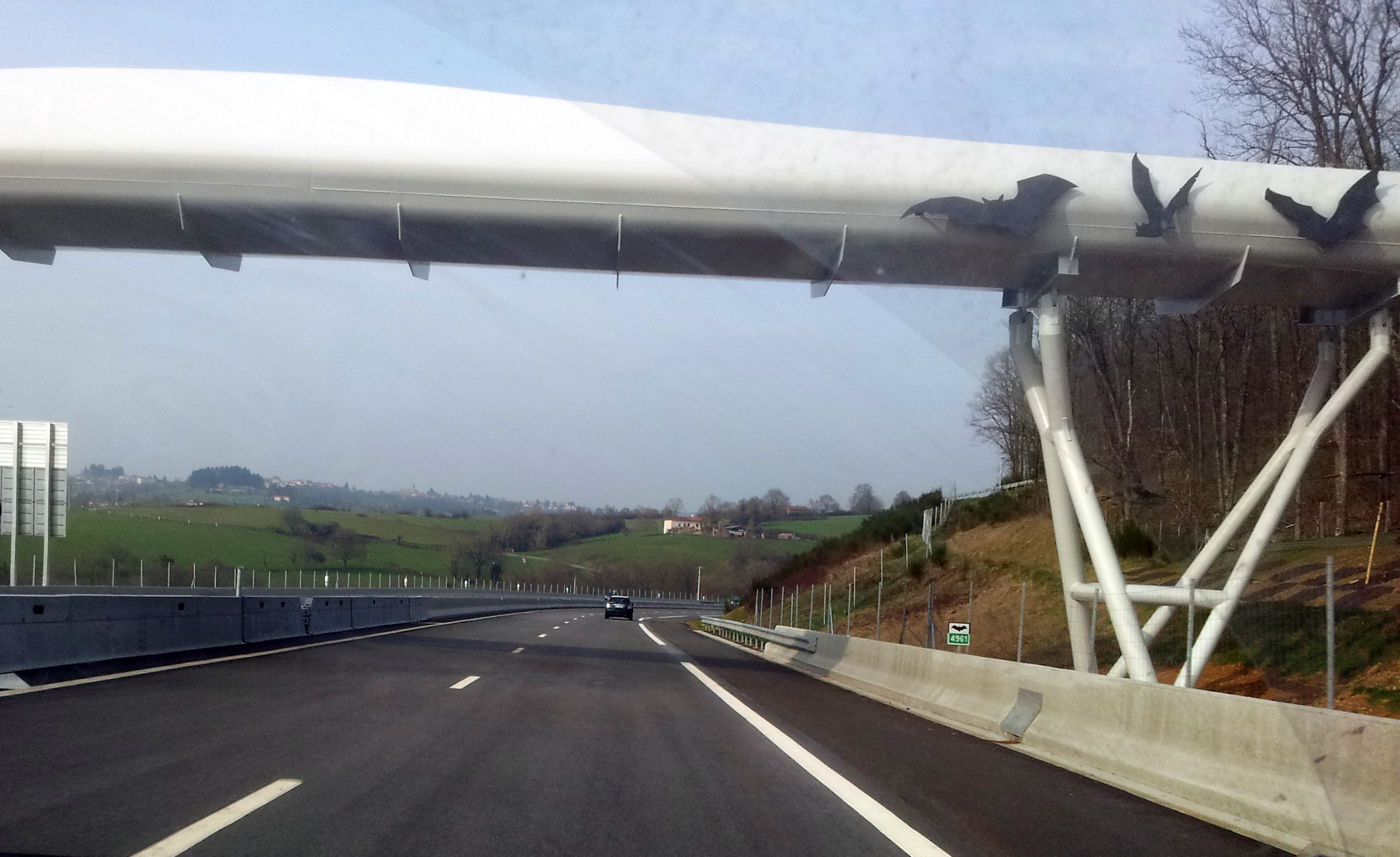
Bat bridge on the A89, near Balbigny, Loire, France

The first bridge to be installed in France is on the A65 motorway between junctions for Roquefort and Caloy in the Landes department.

Two additional bat bridges were completed in November 2012 near Balbigny, on the A89 motorway.

=== Germany ===
Two metal bridges were built in 2013 to protect the Mouse-eared Bat at Biberach an der Riss, Baden-Wuerttemberg. The structures cost £375,000 (400,000 €).

=== United Kingdom ===
Bat bridges have been implemented in the United Kingdom by various agencies, including the Highways Agency, with support of the Bat Conservation Trust.

At A38 Dobwalls Bypass, the bridges are more elaborate and sophisticated than the earlier Welsh structures, which consisted of cables strung from poles.

Bat bridges in the United Kingdom
Name	Road	Opened	Approx. length	Single or dual carriageway	Placement	Approx. cost	Other details	Ref.
Stainburn and Great Clifton Bypass	A66	December 2002	Gantry	Single (three-lane carriageway)				
High and Low Newton	A590	April 2008	33 m	Dual	In cutting	£45,000		
Dobwalls (2 Structures)	A38	June 2008	Structure 1: 59.47 m, Structure 2: 70 m	Dual	At Grade/In Cutting	£300,000	One structure consists of three steel towers with cables suspended between them carrying mesh panels. The other consists of a single span of cables and mesh panels between concrete and steel anchors either side of a cutting. In the Dobwalls scheme, a third bat-crossing consisted of a raised parapet modification to a new road bridge, Havett Road.	
Parton to Lillyhall	A595	Dec 2008	34 m	Dual	On embankment	£34,133		
Haydon Bridge	A69	April 2009	19.5	Single	In cutting	£60,000		
Pwllheli and Criccieth	A497	2006		Single	At Grade		A bat bridge was installed following the upgrade of the A497 to help the six species of bats in the area to cross the road.	
Elveden	A11	2014		Dual	Various	£350,000	Six bat bridges.	
Gilwern to Abergavenny	A465	2007		Dual	Embankment		Two bat bridges were constructed during road upgrade in locations where full bridges previously stood.	
Groeslon	A487	2010		Single			The road runs through the Glynllifon Special Area of Conservation which is home to a lesser horseshoe bat colony.	
Norwich	A1270	2017		Dual		£1,000,000	Seven bat bridges on the Norwich Northern Distributor Road.	

== Criticism ==
The overall cost of bat bridges was criticised by Lord Marlesford in the House of Lords in 2011, for being funded "at a time when we're having to cut a lot of public spending".

A team from the University of Leeds examined the effectiveness of bat bridges, gantries and underpasses. They found that one underpass, placed on a commuting route, was used by 96% of bats, but few bats used the other underpasses and gantries, preferring routes which put them in the path of traffic.

== See also ==
- Amphibian and reptile tunnel
- Squirrel bridge
- Wildlife crossing
