= Congress (salamander gathering) =

Salamander mating

Salamander congress is a salamander mating ritual which occurs in spring on the Big Night. It is a gathering of salamanders in vernal pools for the purpose of breeding. When male and female salamanders meet in the vernal pools it is called a congress.

== Etymology ==
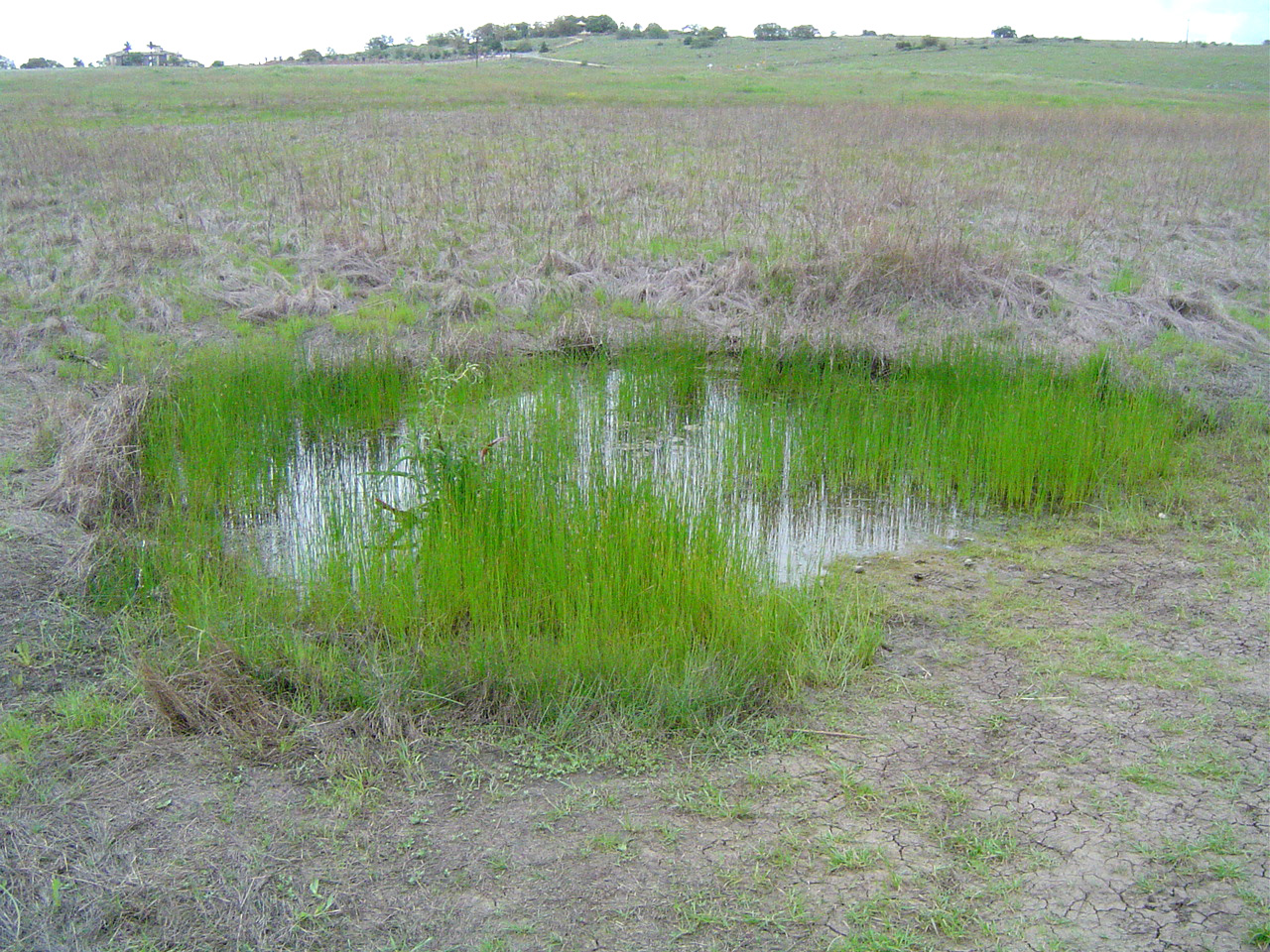
A vernal pool

Oxford English Dictionary defines congressing as "The action of coming together... a sexual union, copulation, coition." The word comes from the Latin congressus. When salamanders gather for the purpose of breeding it is referred to as a congress.

== Background ==
The mass courtship of salamanders is known a congress. The congressing event takes place each spring and this migration of salamanders to vernal pools and is known as the Big Night. The reason it is referred to as a big night is because there is a large number of salamanders moving at the same time. Warmer air and loose soil coupled with rain cause salamanders to leave their underground burrows. The event takes place at night to minimize predation. The rain on the big night keeps the salamanders skin from becoming dry. When male and female salamanders meet in the vernal pools it is called a congress. When a female salamander arrives at a vernal pool she participates in a congress with other salamanders of her species. Eggs are then fertilized and left in the pool. The pools dry up in the summer so fish and other predators cannot survive: this makes the pools a good place for salamanders to breed and lay eggs. Normally fish would eat salamander eggs, but in the vernal pools the eggs are safe. The hatched salamanders can also thrive.

Salamanders are explosive spawners and the females lay thousands of eggs which they attach to sticks below the water. In addition to the loss of the hatching larvae to predators, the larger larvae engage in cannibalism. If the water begins to evaporate or there is a shortage of food, the hatchlings suffer from a crowding effect. The cannibalism ensures the survival of the species. In cases where salamanders must cross roadways, some communities have built amphibian and reptile tunnels to assist the migrating animals travel below the roadway.
