= Red List building materials =

Category of building materials designated as harmful to living creatures

The Living Building Challenge (LBC) Red List contains chemicals commonly used in building materials that have been designated as harmful to "health and the environment". The International Living Future Institute (ILFI) created the list in 2006, and is the only organization that uses the term "Red List".

== Living Building Challenge Red List ==
Chemicals on the red list may not be included in materials used in construction that seeks to meet the criteria of the Living Building Challenge (LBC). According to ILFI, the list is composed of materials that should be phased out of production due to health concerns. The list is now updated annually.

The 2024 LBC red list has over twelve thousand items each identified with a CAS Registry Number. This list includes the following chemical groups:

- Alkylphenols
- Antimicrobials (Marketed with a Health Claim)
- Asbestos Compounds
- Bisphenol A
- California-Banned Solvents
- Chlorinated polymers Including Polyvinyl chloride (PVC), Polyvinylidene chloride (PVDC), Chloroprene (Neoprene Monomer), and CPVC
- Chlorobenzenes
- Chlorofluorocarbons (CFCs) and Hydrochlorofluorocarbons (HCFCs)
- Formaldehyde (added)
- Halogenated fire retardants (HFRs)
- Organotin Compounds
- Perfluorinated and Polyfluorinated Alkyl Substances (PFAS) / Perfluorinated compounds (PFCs)
- Phthalates (Orthophthalates)
- Polychlorinated Biphenyls (PCBs)
- Polycyclic Aromatic Hydrocarbons (PAHS)
- Short-Chain and Medium-Chain Chlorinated paraffins
- Toxic Heavy Metals including Arsenic, Cadmium, Chromium VI, Lead (added), and Mercury
- Volatile organic compounds (VOCs) in wet applied products
- Wood treatments containing creosote or pentachlorophenol

In addition to this red list, LBC criteria mandate that petrochemical fertilizers and pesticides cannot be used during the certification period or be used in operations and maintenance.

=== The Red List and the Living Building Challenge ===
The Living Building Challenge includes seven performance categories, titled as petals. The red list falls under the materials petal. A building project may not contain any of the Red List chemicals or chemical groups. There is an exception for small components in complex products. Each of these exceptions must include a written explanation. These exceptions will only be approved with a copy of the letter sent to the manufacturer stating that the product purchase does not ensure an endorsement. In addition, the final documentation must include a statement that asks the manufacturer to stop using the red list material or chemical. There are also temporary red list exceptions for numerous red list items for which viable alternatives are not yet commercially available.

=== Declare Product Label ===
Declare is a product labeling program that relies on the LBC Red List as its primary basis for material evaluation. In creating a Declare label for a product, a manufacturer must disclose all of that product's intentionally added constituent chemicals to the designated 100 parts per million (ppm) reporting threshold. Additionally, the manufacturer must report the extent to which that product is compliant with the Red List. The three compliance levels are: (1) LBC Red List free, which means that the product is free of all red list ingredients; (2) LBC compliant, which means that the product contains some chemicals that ILFI has designated as temporary red list exceptions; or (3) declared, which means that the product is not compliant with the Red List or its temporary exceptions.

A project compliant with the Living Building Challenge must include at least one Declare product for every 500 m^{2} (5382 ft^{2}) of gross building area and must send Declare program information to at least 10 manufacturers not yet using Declare.

== Other building industry toxic chemical lists ==
Several other entities in the building industry have developed lists that operate in a similar manner to the LBC Red List. Three of them are described below.

=== Cradle to Cradle Banned Chemicals List ===
The Cradle to Cradle Products Innovation Institute (C2CPII) is a non-profit group that develops and administers the Cradle-to-Cradle Certified Product Standard. This multi-attribute standard evaluates a product's performance in five impact categories: material health, material reutilization, renewable energy and carbon management, water stewardship, and social fairness. In this product standard, the material health evaluation criteria include compliance with a banned chemical list for bronze level certification. Certified products may not contain listed chemicals as intentionally added ingredients above 1000 ppm. According to C2CPII, chemicals are selected for inclusion on the list due to their tendency to accumulate in the biosphere and lead to irreversible negative human health effects. Additionally, several substances were selected due to the hazards associated with their manufacture, use, and disposal.

=== Perkins and Will Transparency List ===
The Perkins and Will Transparency List includes substances commonly found in the built environment that regulatory entities have classified as being harmful to human and/or environmental health. Because these regulatory designations are constantly evolving, the list is updated as new information is published. The tool is fundamentally grounded in the concept of the Precautionary Principle.

=== LEED Pilot Credit 11: Chemical Avoidance in Building Materials ===
In 2011, the U.S. Green Building Council (USGBC) piloted a credit for its Leadership in Energy and Environmental Design (LEED) rating system that intended to reduce the quantity of indoor contaminants that are harmful to the comfort and well-being of installers and occupants. This pilot credit, which was not included in LEED Version 4, required that specific interior building materials and products not contain listed chemicals for all applicable materials. The list includes halogenated flame retardants and phthalates.
