= Big Night (amphibians) =

Annual amphibian mating event

Big Night is an annual event common to amphibians as they emerge from underground hibernation in the spring, travel to vernal pools, and mate.

== Background ==
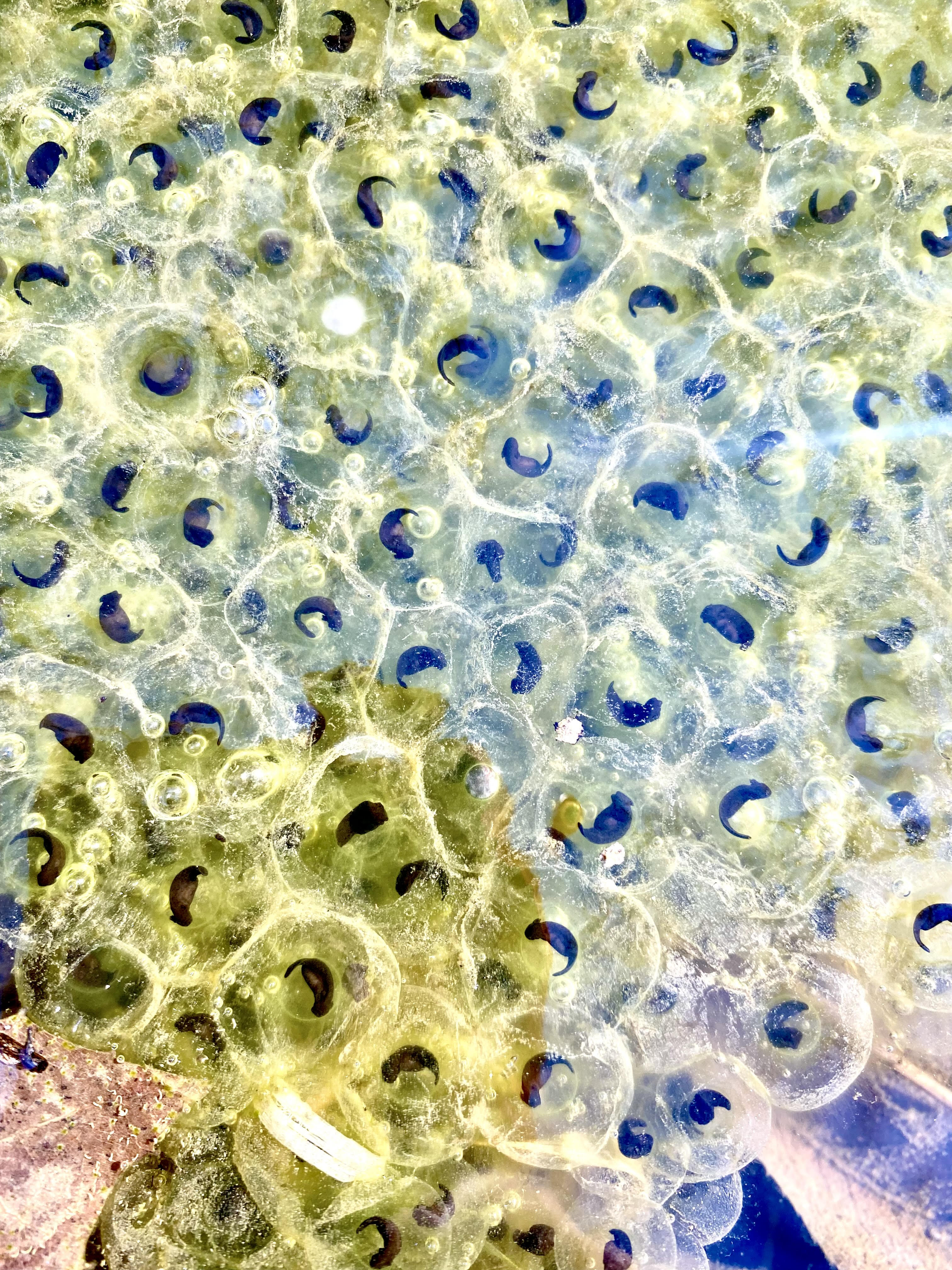
Close up of Spotted Salamander eggs in a vernal pool

The reason it is referred to as a big night is because there is a large number of salamanders and/or frogs moving at the same time. Warmer air and loose soil coupled with rain cause these animals to leave their underground burrows. The event takes place at night to minimize predation. The rain on the big night keeps the salamanders and frogs skin from becoming dry. Amphibians such as salamanders and frogs in a local area typically use the same overwintering area and the same breeding area, returning generation after generation to the area in which they were spawned. The breeding locations are areas where vernal pools develop from snowmelt and spring rains. The two locations can be a half-mile apart or even further. Although referred to as the Big Night, the event for a species sometimes occurs on several occasions over days or weeks. In temperate areas, the event usually happens when temperatures are optimal for the particular species, after rainfall. The salamander gathering for the mating ritual is known as a salamander congress.

== Human assistance ==
In some areas where the path of migration crosses a roadway, volunteers may assist the amphibians to cross the road safely. In some, amphibian and reptile tunnels have been built to funnel the migrating animals safely under the roadway.

== In popular culture ==
Loren Eiseley wrote an essay, The Dance of the Frogs, about Big Night.
