= Amphibian and reptile tunnel =

Tunnels under roads for wildlife

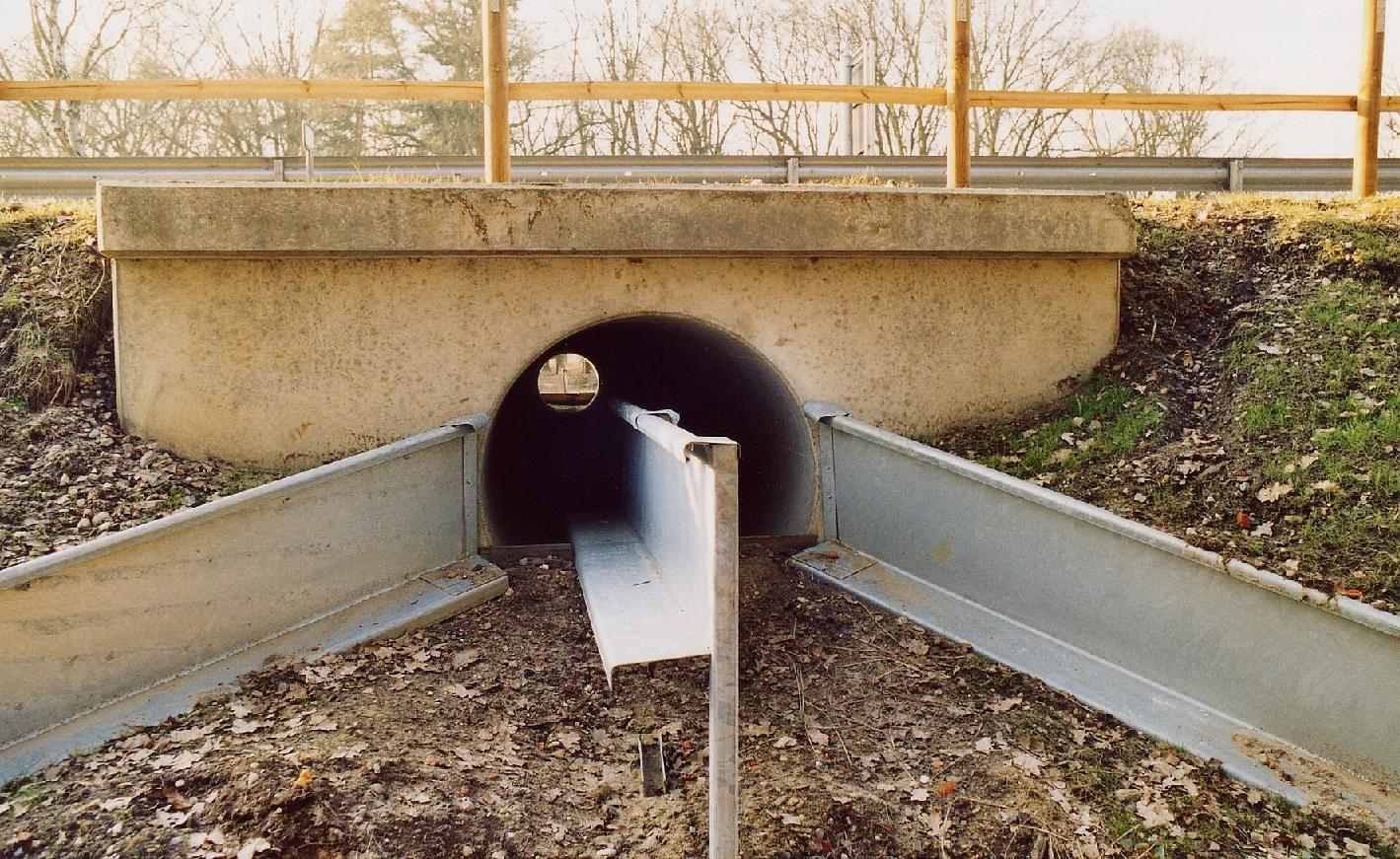
Toad tunnel in Germany

Amphibian and reptile tunnels, also known as herp tunnels, are a type of wildlife crossing that is positioned beneath a roadway. The tunnels allow amphibians and reptiles to cross roads without the risk of being crushed by a vehicle. They have been used by toads, frogs and salamanders. The tunnels are used to get to their Big Night, a mass courtship ritual which is known as a salamander congress.

In areas that do not have tunnels, municipalities enlist volunteers to hand-carry reptiles across roadways. Some governments in the United States and Europe build herp tunnels which are large enough to accommodate reptiles like turtles. Snakes also use tunnels to cross roads.

== History ==
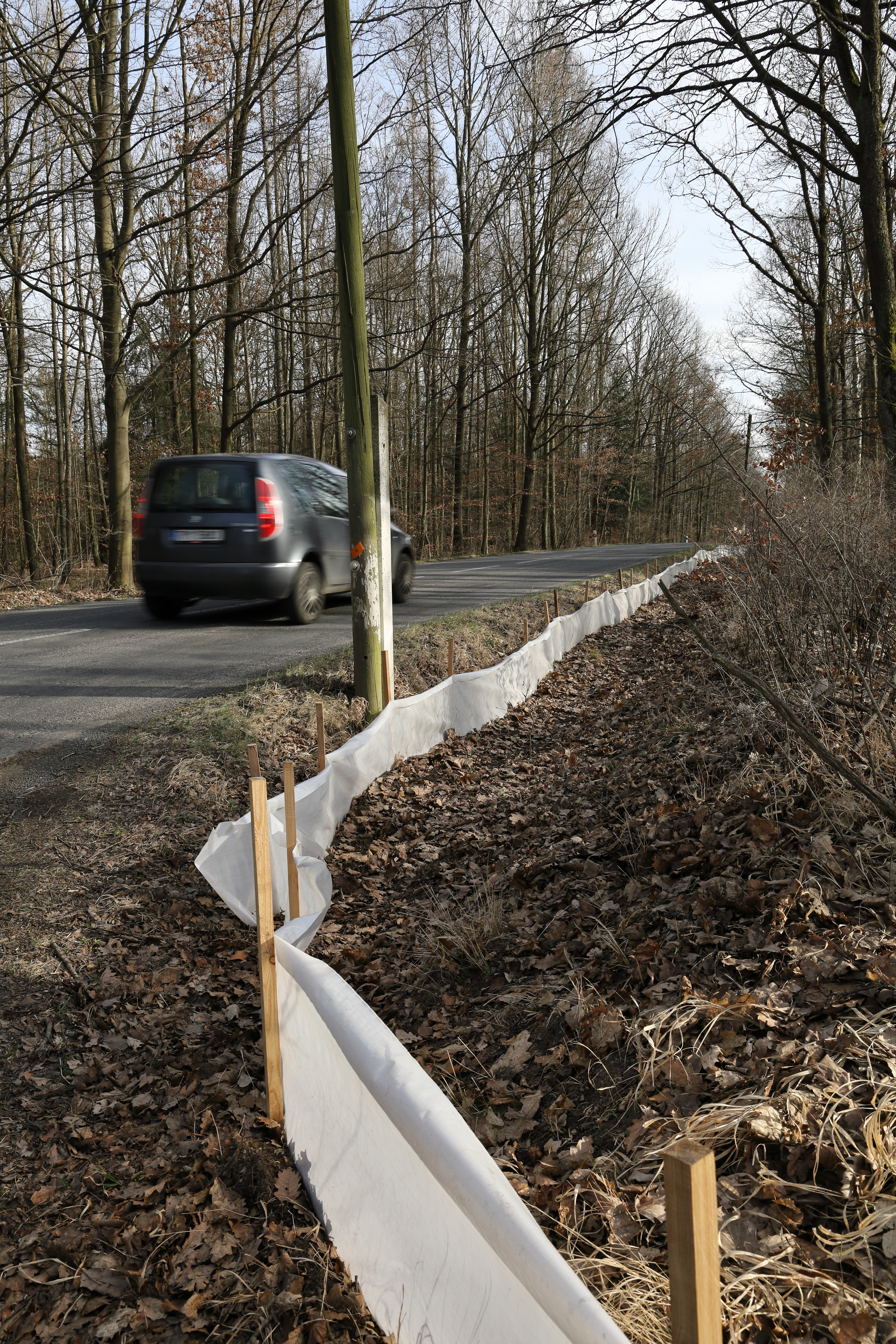
Amphibian barricades are used in conjunction with tunnels to direct the animals away from roads and toward the tunnels

In the United States, the first amphibian tunnels were the Henry Street salamander tunnels. The tunnels were built in 1987 and they are in Amherst, Massachusetts. After the success of the Henry Street tunnels, the state of California built salamander tunnels under roads. In Davis, California a tunnel was built under a busy road to help toads cross the road. The United States Geological Survey has published a document stating that amphibian and reptile tunnels are best practices. They have created a guide which advocates for the use of more tunnels.

In other areas of the United States volunteers help amphibians cross roads by hand. In New Hampshire people still hand-move salamanders. The Harris Center for Conservation Education organizes a salamander Crossing Brigade made up of volunteers each year. In New Jersey volunteers assist salamanders and other amphibians crossing roads. New York state has a similar volunteer salamander assist project. The tunnels are used by the salamanders to get to vernal pools so that they can court mates on their Big Night. The courtship of the salamanders is known as a salamander congress.

Other countries have been creating amphibian tunnels to reduce amphibian mortality. In Sweden, officials created under road passages with double-sided guiding fences. In Germany, amphibian tunnels have been created to help frogs safely cross roads. In Europe, these tunnels are sometimes referred to as "herp tunnels" the name for the study of amphibians and reptiles: herpetology. The European herp tunnels followed the same design as the Henry Street tunnels: fences and tunnels beneath roads.

In Canada the city of Guelph, Ontario, has built tunnels to help reptiles cross roads. The tunnels are used by amphibians but they are large enough for snapping turtles. In addition other slow moving reptiles like garter snakes, brown snakes use the tunnels. In Britain tunnels were built under a roadway to help adder snakes cross the road. The tunnels have a grate on top so that sunlight can enter the tunnel for the cold-blooded reptiles.

In 2022 a senior housing developer in Davis was ordered to build tunnels for toads. The city Planning Commission required an 18 in (460 mm) wooden boardwalk above the waterline inside of two 8 ft (2.4 m) wide underground culverts.

== See also ==
- Newt fencing
- Bat bridge
- Culvert
- Toad tunnel
- Urbanization
- Wildlife corridor
