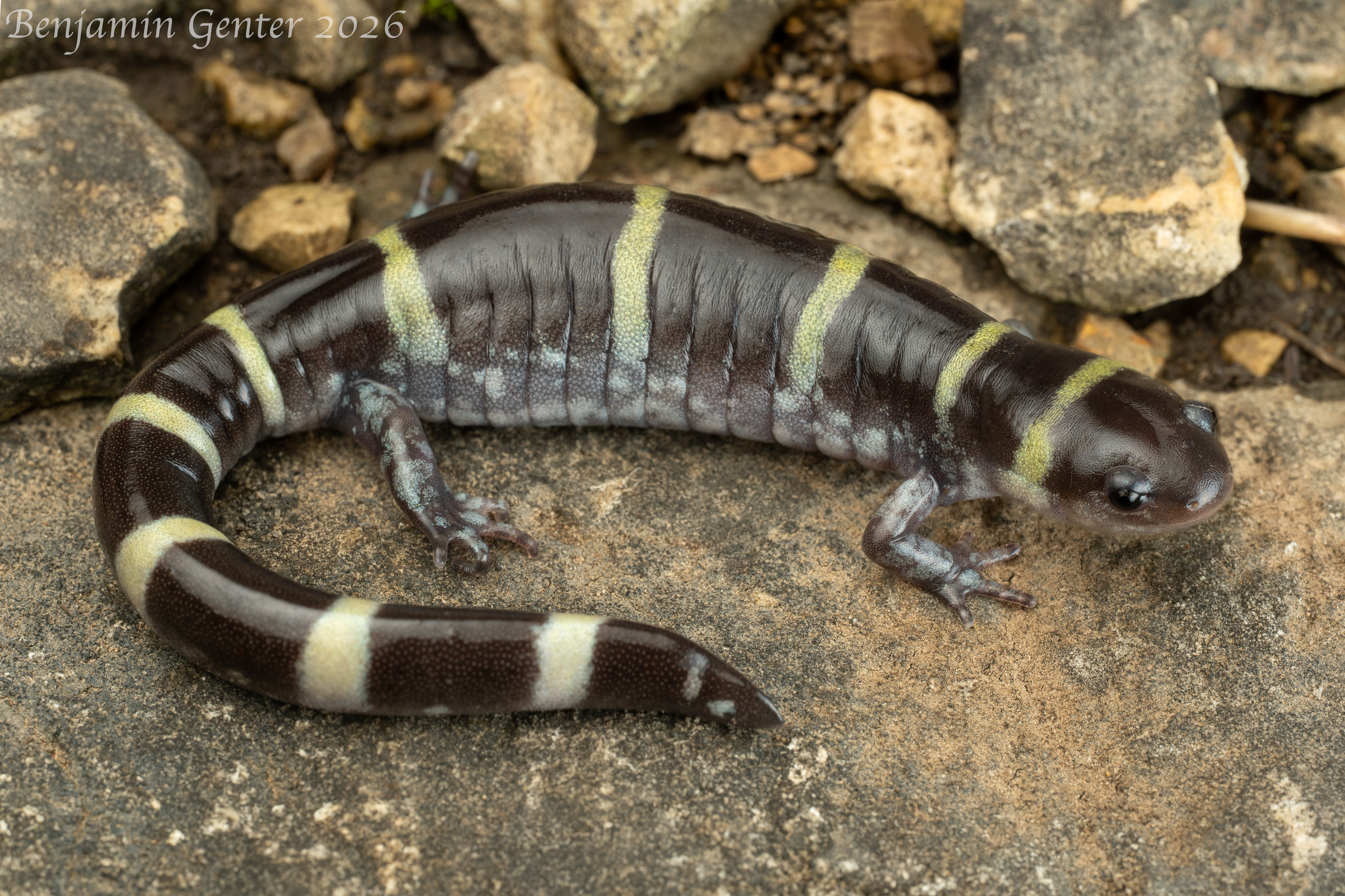

Conservation status
- Least Concern (IUCN 3.1)

Scientific classification
- Kingdom: Animalia
- Phylum: Chordata
- Class: Amphibia
- Order: Urodela
- Family: Ambystomatidae
- Genus: Ambystoma
- Species: A. annulatum

Binomial name
- Ambystoma annulatum Cope, 1886
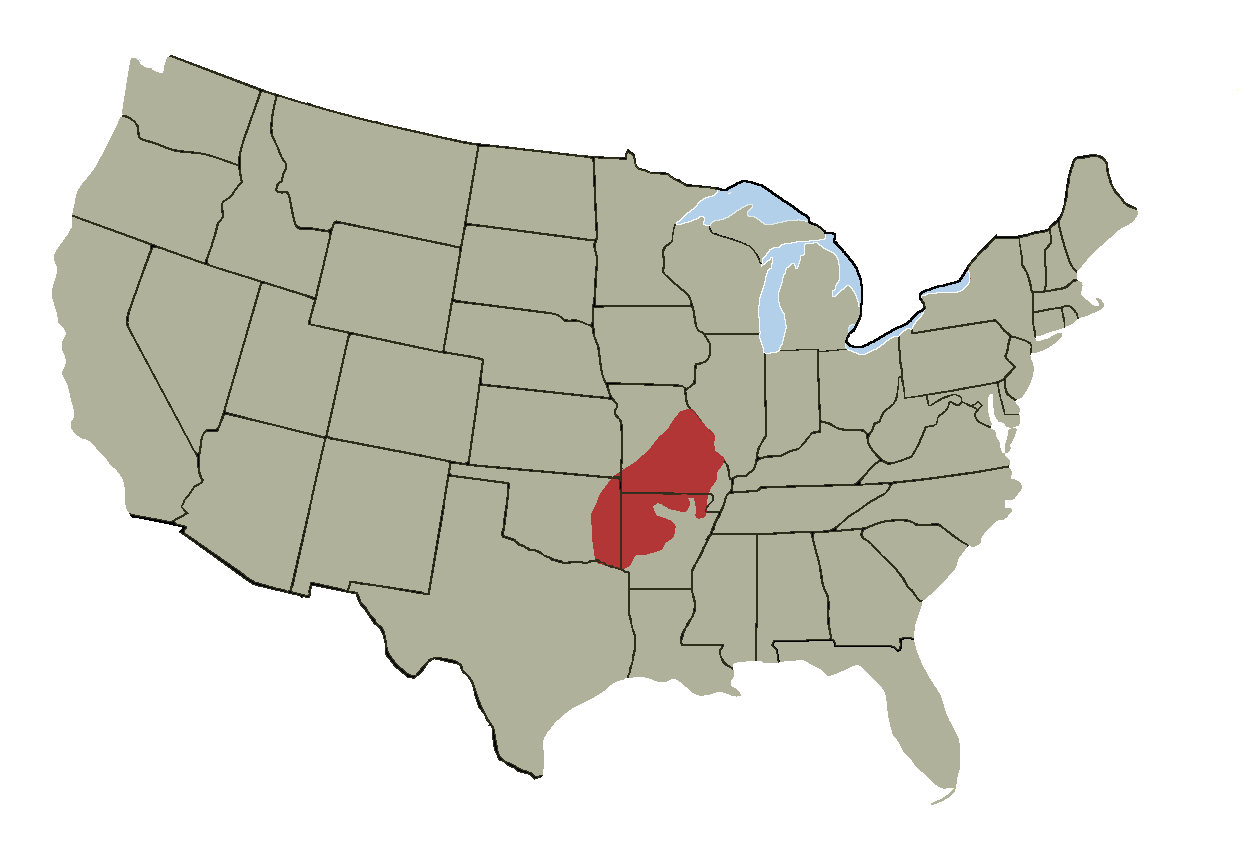
- Ringed salamander distribution

Synonyms
- Linguaelapsus annulatum (Cope, 1887)

= Ringed salamander =

Species of amphibian

The ringed salamander (Ambystoma annulatum) is a species of mole salamander native to hardwood and mixed hardwood-pine forested areas in and around the Ozark Plateau and Ouachita Mountains of Arkansas, Oklahoma, and Missouri. This species of salamander has slender body, small head, and long tail. They are usually found to have various dorsal color from dark gray to dark brown. Various close relatives are found such as marbled salamander (A. opacum) and spotted salamander (A. maculatum). This species of salamander has cannibal behavior especially those in large body size.

It is found in damp, forested areas, usually under leaves, rotting logs, or in abandoned ground holes of other organisms, near shallow ponds. Highly fossorial (adapted to digging), adults are often found in subterranean refuges. This salamander is increasingly rare and perhaps endangered. This is likely a result of its restricted range and specific breeding habit needs. The world population is thought to be around 100,000 animals. Its conservation status is assessed as Least Concern by the IUCN. This salamander can perform embryotic learning and social-facilitated learning.

== Description ==
The Ringed Salamander has a slender body shape with a small head and a long tail. This species has 15 costal (along the ribs) grooves and a depressed round snout. There are two arrays of vomerine teeth—teeth along a thin bone that form the inferior and posterior part of the nasal septum and divide the nostrils. Each series contains 7 - 11 teeth. Each of their hind feet has five toes. The dorsal color of adults can range from dark gray to blackish brown decorated with white to yellowish bands and light-colored dots. Ventral sides are generally grayish-yellow. Newly metamorphosed juveniles have black backs and white bellies. A row of light spots extended from their forelimbs to the tails. Soon after metamorphosis yellow bands started to appear, and complete adult colorations form within two months after metamorphosis.

== Habitat and distribution ==
=== Habitat ===
Ringed salamander is strictly terrestrial and has been found in hardwood and mixed hardwood-pine forests. During non-breeding seasons, adults hide under leaves, rotting logs, or abandoned holes on the ground in damp forest areas. Larvae and juveniles exist in small, fishless semi-permanent ponds. Most ringed salamanders are found in the vicinity of Hot Springs, Arkansas, and the Missouri portion of the Ozark Plateau. Small populations have also been found in eastern Oklahoma.

=== Geographic distribution ===
Ringed salamander is endemic to the Ozark plateau and the Ouachita Mountains of southern Missouri, Arkansas, and eastern Oklahoma. This is a much more restricted range of distribution compared to other species in the same genus, such as A. maculatum and A. opacum.

== Conservation ==
=== Habitat loss ===
While drying of ponds during late summer has significant impacts on spring breeding species such as spotted salamanders, it does not affect ringed salamanders much. However, a reduction of rain and numbers of filling ponds during September and October can cause a great decrease in ringed salamander's breeding efforts and egg depositions. Although average canopy cover and leaf litter depth do not significantly relate to ringed salamander's occupancy, continuous forests are highly associated with its breeding wetlands. Clear-cut timber harvest also has a negative effect on ringed salamander distribution. Forest sites after a clear-cut harvest have more open canopies, which results in higher ground temperatures. In order to survive, ringed salamanders either retreat underground into burrows or move to other places. Thus, juveniles and adults with small body sizes are more vulnerable as they have lower dispersal abilities.

=== Conservation efforts ===
There are two major areas of focus for maximizing the proliferation of ringed salamanders, which concentrate on minimizing the local extinction of both juveniles and adults and maintaining metapopulation dynamics respectively. Protecting permanent fishless ponds is crucial for the survival of metamorphosing juveniles. Maintaining terrestrial habitat around the breeding ponds is important for reproducing adults. A study has shown that a core terrestrial habitat with a radius of 200-500m from the pond edge must be established to provide enough space for the survival of breeding adults, especially during their first reproduction. Connectivity between ponds is critical for keeping sufficient gene flows among multiple populations. A suitable habitat should have breeding ponds no more than 300m from each other, and rescue-recolonization management is recommended.

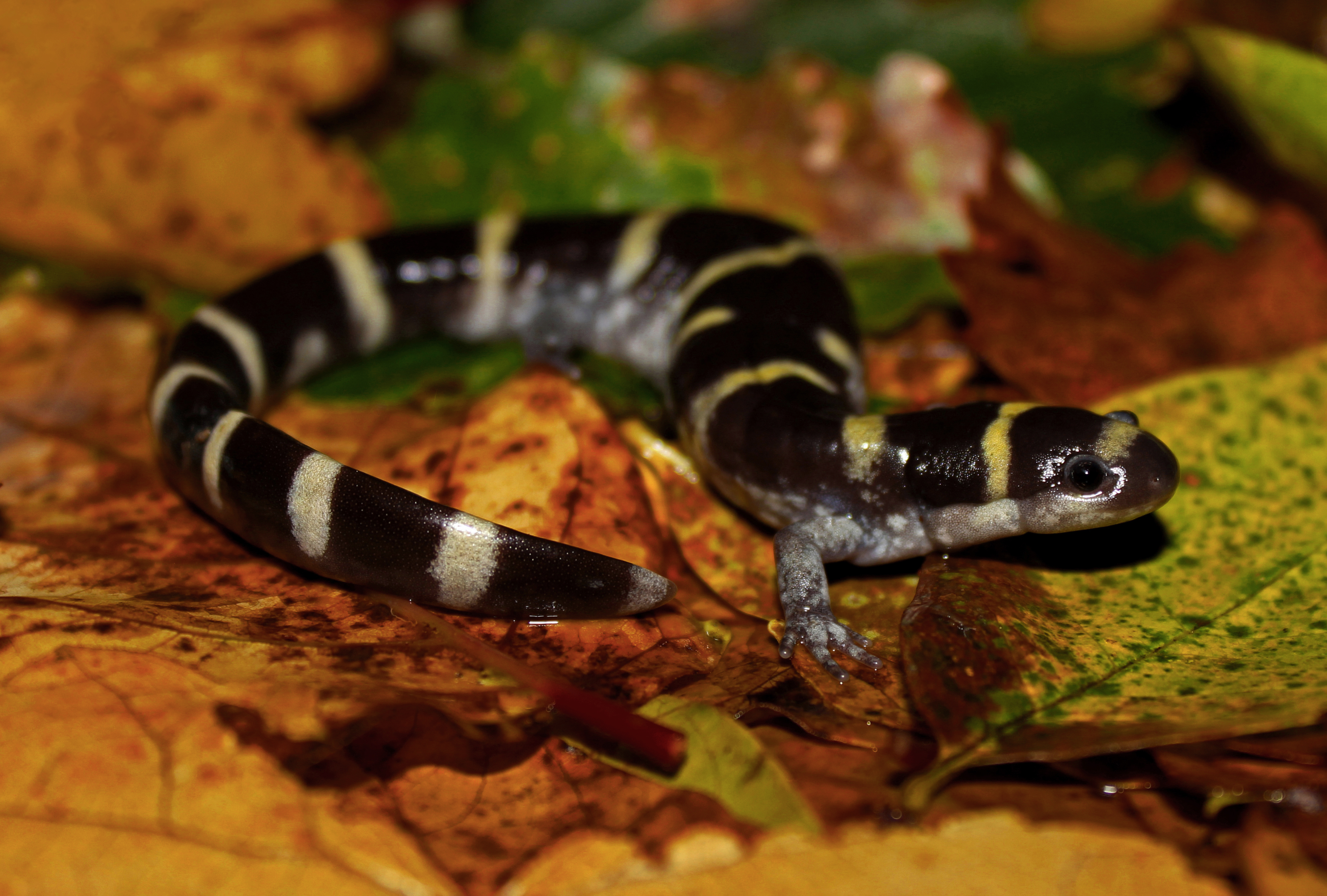
Ringed Salamander on leaf detritus

== Population structure ==
=== Close relatives ===
Ringed salamander (A. annulatum), marbled salamander (A. opacum), and spotted salamander (A. maculatum) are sympatric close relatives, and they are all terrestrial. They all belong to a famous genus of salamanders called mole salamanders (Ambystoma). Spotted salamanders and marbled salamanders have much larger distributions and are more well-studied than ringed salamanders. Similar to ringed salamanders, marbled salamanders also breed in fall, while the other species spotted salamander breeds in spring.

=== Genetic population structure ===
Molecular evidence from nuclear microsatellites and mitochondrial DNA analysis shows that populations of ringed salamanders in the Central Interior Highlands ecoregion are separated into two. One population lives on the Ozark plateau in the north, while the other population lives in the Ouachita Mountain in the south. The separation first occurred during the Cretaceous to mid-Miocene and was further bisected by the development of the Arkansas River system during the Pleistocene. Genetic differentiation is also largely influenced by human-induced habitat fragmentation since European settlement.

== Diet ==
Common preys for ringed salamander larvae include microcrustaceans, dipteran larvae, larval chironimids, and many larval and adult insects such as beetles, snails, earthworms, and eggs of other salamanders and frogs. Ringed salamanders usually serve as the top predator in their breeding ponds. This is likely due to the fall breeding timing of ringed salamanders, which allows them to prey on individuals of other spring breeding species that are still in their early life stages such as spotted salamanders, marbled salamanders, red-spotted newts, and many other anuran species, thus decreases their abundances.

=== Cannibalism ===
Although larvae of all sizes eat other prey species, those with larger body sizes can be cannibalistic. Cannibalism can be beneficial as conspecific preys are large, might contain growth-promoting hormones, and lack toxic substances in heterospecific preys. However, there is also a risk of pathogen and endoparasite transmissions. The cannibals differ from their conspecific prey by having twice longer mean body lengths and slightly broader heads. The long breeding season leads to increasing larvae size variation, which contributes to the possibility of cannibalism. Larvae hatched later in the season have smaller sizes, so early spawn breeders may gain a selective advantage by producing large offspring with higher fitness, but this advantage may be offset by more unpredictable pond conditions. The cannibalism of ringed salamanders is an opportunistic behavior that is more likely to occur in conditions of high larvae density, the coexistence of larvae of various sizes, or insufficient alternate food choice. Larvae that commit cannibalism have been shown to have wider mouths and a larger size than their noncannibal counterparts. This adds to the evidence that cannibalism is an opportunistic enterprise based no having an advantageous size. Ringed salamander larvae have intermediate-level cannibalism compared to other species in the same genus. Spotted salamanders only show cannibalism in extreme conditions, while tiger salamanders (A. tigrinum) have really high tendencies of cannibalism.

== Reproduction and life cycle ==
=== Breeding migration and oviposition ===
Ringed salamander is an autumn breeding species. Males and females both reach their reproductive maturity at 1 year old, but most individuals return for breeding at 2–3 years old. Migration to breeding ponds usually started at night after or during rain in mid-September, and individuals tend to stick with specific ponds every year. Annual cycle of air and soil temperatures ensures that adults enter reproductive conditions in time, but autumn rainfall is the major factor that triggers breeding migration, and the precipitation threshold must be at least 1.27 cm. A huge variation of breeding population size exists across ponds and years, which is positively correlated with the amount of rainfall during migration season. Males start to migrate to breeding ponds as early as August, which is earlier than females with the earliest record in September. The end date of migration is in early November, which is similar for both sexes.

After mating, egg laying begins on the night of courtship or the next day and is completed within two days. The female extends her rear legs laterally and arches their backs to get the cloacae onto a substrate. She stays motionless after climbing onto a suitable object until muscular contractions start. The contraction spread posteriorly from a point 2.5 from the front to the rear legs, depositing eggs from the cloaca one at a time in a row. Shapes of egg masses can be strings, clumps, or large clusters, which largely depend on what are the available supporting materials, such as sticks, for oviposition. Adults leave the pond right after breeding but could remain active above-ground for several days before getting back to their resting places.

=== Larval and juvenile development ===
Larvae start to present in ponds in September and October. Based on eggs hatched in the laboratory environment, the average total length of larvae just hatched is 11.5mm. Unlike spring breeding species, ringed salamander larvae overwinter under the ice in their birth ponds. The larval period ranges from 7 to 9 months, which is similar to that of marbled salamanders. Larvae mortality can be caused by freezing, drying, low pH, predation including cannibalism, and disease. Premetamorphic mortality can be as high as 99.9% and peaks during the first two months post-hatching and during metamorphic periods.

Juveniles generally emerge in April the following spring. The average survival rate of juveniles from eggs to metamorphosis is only 0.2%, which is really low and does not vary much among ponds or years. The mean snout-vent length of metamorphosing juveniles is 39.2mm, which is about 50% of that of breeding adults, but the largest juvenile can be 76% of the adult size. Juveniles that metamorphosed in early spring are usually larger than those that metamorphose later in the summer. A larger body size corresponds to a high probability of surviving, a younger age at first reproduction, and a longer lifespan. This is the opposite trend compared to spotted salamanders, of which juveniles metamorphose later are larger, and have higher fitness.

== Limb regeneration loss of adults ==
The limb regeneration time of larval salamanders shortens with development, and postmetamorphic adult larval salamanders exhibit little or no limb regeneration. Through experiments looking at regeneration times for larval salamanders at different age (40 days), axolotl (30+ days), newt (44 days) and adult salamanders (155 to 370 days), it was found that the limb regeneration time of each stage has a huge difference. Based on two criteria: each stage is similar to the sequences of previous stages of newt, while these stages must be easily identifiable by examining the external morphology of living organisms, the results revealed 11 well-defined regeneration phases. There is a saying that environmental conditions cause salamanders to lose the ability to express their intrinsic ability. Regeneration was observed in the following conditions for the adult salamanders: A. annulatum, 324 to 370 dpa; A. maculatum, 255 to 300 dpa; A. texanum, 215 to 250 dpa; and A. tigrinum, 155 to 180 dpa.

== Mate behavior ==
Ringed salamanders are sexually dimorphic. Breeding females are larger than males, with the mean snout-vent length being 96.3mm and 84.2mm respectively. At each breeding pond, the adult sex ratio is consistently male-biased with a 2.05:1 ratio.(2) A mass courtship happens when a large number of males and some females arrived at a pond. Initially, one male approaches a female and nudges her cloaca and sides of the body with his snout. After that, he quickly deposits a spermatophore somewhere nearby. A male usually deposits one spermatophore at a time but could also lay up to four in succession. This behavior is repeated and reaches a peak that lasts for 10–15 minutes. As more and more males join, a crowd of male forms around a female, where each male begin to nose the female and other males indiscriminately, and lots of spermatophores are laid at the same spot. Multiple males tend to lay their spermatophores next to or on top of each other. There can be as many as 10 or more spermatophores within a 1.6 cm^{2} area. Researchers did not observe any female participation in the courtship. Females lay fertilized eggs after the mass courtship, so they might pick one or more spermatophores after the courtship as do female A. maculatum, the sympatric relative of ringed salamander. Another possibility is females may follow a chosen male and pick up his spermatophores specifically.

== Social behavior ==
Ringed salamanders can learn what are predators and foods from chemical stimuli as early as embryos. This allows larvae to avoid predation and have a higher foraging efficiency right after hatching. Lab experiments have proved that embryos exposed to odors of prey species like shrimp and mussel show attraction to those stimuli post-hatching. Embryotic exposures to chemical stimuli from cannibalistic larvae or predators, such as Eastern newt (Notophthalmus viridescens) and dragonfly nymphs, resulted in increasing use of habitat refuge (vegetation cover) and decreasing activities post-hatching. These are signs of anti-predator responses. Decreasing activity is especially effective for avoiding the detection of visual predators and reducing encountering possibilities. The underlying physiological mechanism might be that the stimuli can shape the developing olfactory system in a different way to cause either olfactory imprinting or sensitization. Because of the plasticity of ringed salamander's diet, researchers think that sensitization is a more plausible explanation as it means a temporary response to a stimulus, while olfactory imprinting means showing a long-term response.

Young larvae are also able to distinguish between predator and prey after observing other larvae that are known as conspecific models. Social learning is commonly thought to exist only in group-living organisms, but it can happen in non-gregarious species like ringed salamanders as well. Ringed salamander larvae can form temporary high-density groups during a short period after hatching, which provides the environment for social learning. A study on ringed salamanders has demonstrated that a larva can successfully recognize dragonfly nymph as a danger after watching the anti-predator reactions of four conspecific demonstrators. This socially facilitated learning and the former embryotic learning are both beneficial in a way that it minimizes costs due to direct samplings of different foods and random encounters with predators.

== Enemies ==
Fish is a predator of ringed salamanders at all life stages in ponds. Aquatic insects, salamanders, snakes, and wading birds, such as, can all be potential predators of ringed salamander larvae. Studies have recorded many insect predators including Odonata, Hemiptera, and Thanmophis Proximus. Bird predators include great blue herons and American bittern, snake predators include Nerodia sipedon, and turtle predators include Chelydra serpentina.

Larvae's anti-predator responses gradually decrease with increasing body sizes. Large larvae are less vulnerable to gap-limited predators such as newts. They are either too big as preys or have swifter fleeing reactions with stronger muscles. Ringed salamanders that are one month before metamorphosis are completely immune to newt predation.

Ringed salamanders also suffer from lots of endoparasites. The most common parasite species is ascarid nematode (Cosmocercoides variabilis). This parasite is not only commonly found in ringed salamander, but also spreads widely in the family Ambystomatidae. Rhabditid nematodes (Rhabdias ranae) are the second most common parasite that infests A. annulatum's lungs and body cavities. Other relatively rare parasites include gall bladder myxosporean (Myxidium serotinum) and tissue-dwelling spirurids that are usually en-cysted in ringed salamanders' stomach walls.
