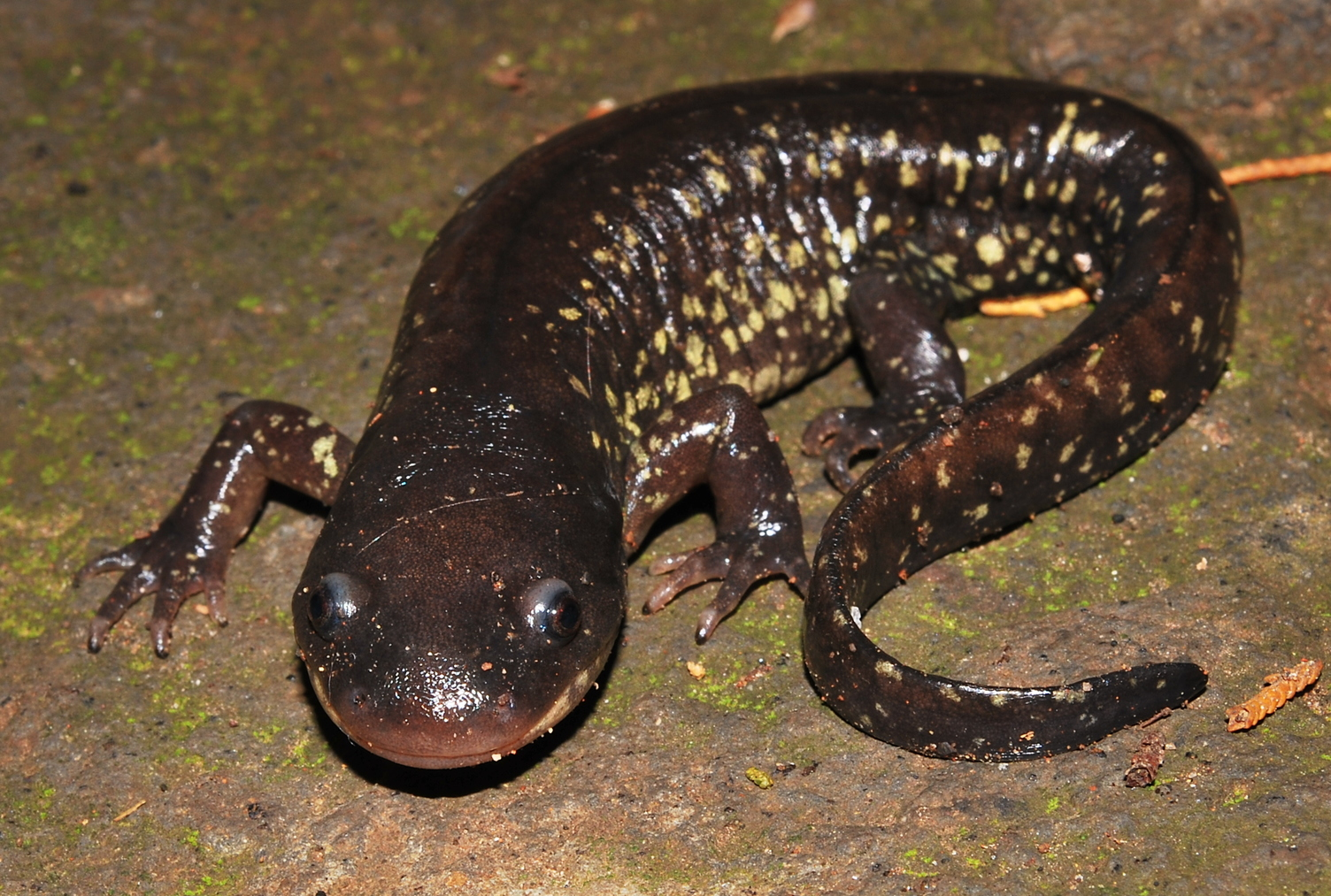
- Ambystoma flavipiperatum in Jalisco, Mexico

Conservation status
- Endangered (IUCN 3.1)

Scientific classification
- Kingdom: Animalia
- Phylum: Chordata
- Class: Amphibia
- Order: Urodela
- Family: Ambystomatidae
- Genus: Ambystoma
- Species: A. flavipiperatum

Binomial name
- Ambystoma flavipiperatum Dixon, 1963

= Yellow-peppered salamander =

Yellow-Peppered Salamander

Species of amphibian

The yellow-peppered salamander (Ambystoma flavipiperatum) also known as the salamandra de Champala and the yellow-headed salamander, is a species of mole salamander native to areas at an elevation of 4900 ft around Santa Cruz, Rancho Malveste and Tapalpa in Jalisco, Mexico.

It is a large yellow salamander with large dark spots running down its dorsal surface – thus the "yellow-peppered" designation. This is also the meaning of its species name in Latin. It has almond eyes and a wide body. It was described as most similar to the Blunt-Headed Salamander, Ambystoma amblycephalum.

Larvae have the same coloration as adults, and can be quite large before undergoing metamorphosis. They have long, thick external gills, almond eyes, and tall caudal fins. Neoteny may occur in some individuals, but neotenic populations are not known.
