= Delicate-skinned salamander =

Conservation status
- Data Deficient (IUCN 3.1)

Scientific classification
- Kingdom: Animalia
- Phylum: Chordata
- Class: Amphibia
- Order: Urodela
- Family: Ambystomatidae
- Genus: Ambystoma
- Species: A. bombypellum

Binomial name
- Ambystoma bombypellum (Taylor, 1940)

Species of amphibian

The delicate-skinned salamander (Ambystoma bombypellum) is an extremely rare species of mole salamander.

== Description ==
The delicate-skinned salamander was first described by herpetologist Edward Harrison Taylor from a holotype found in 1939 near Rancho Guadalupe, 14 km. east of San Martín in the north-western Asunción province in Mexico. It is until today the only habitat for this species. Introduced predatory fish and habitat destruction due to agriculture lead to a desiccation of the breeding ponds and to a severely decline of the population. It is a small terrestrial species of about 14.2 cm, with a brown dorsal coloration and a lighter underbelly. The head is flattened. Fingers and toes are unwebbed.
