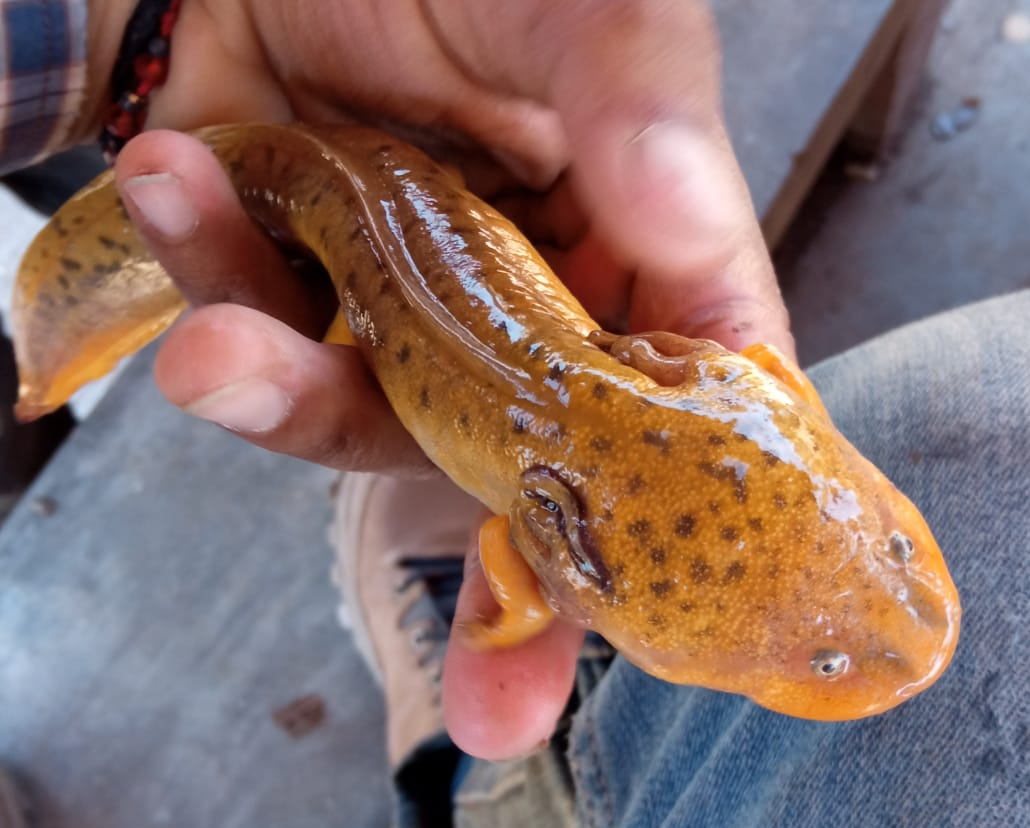

Conservation status
- Endangered (IUCN 3.1)

Scientific classification
- Kingdom: Animalia
- Phylum: Chordata
- Class: Amphibia
- Order: Urodela
- Family: Ambystomatidae
- Genus: Ambystoma
- Species: A. granulosum

Binomial name
- Ambystoma granulosum Taylor, 1944

= Granular salamander =

Species of amphibian

The granular salamander or ajolote (Ambystoma granulosum) is a species of mole salamander in the family Ambystomatidae. It is found only in Mexico. Its natural habitats are subtropical or tropical high-altitude grassland, freshwater marshes, intermittent freshwater marshes, and ponds. It is threatened by habitat loss and overcropping along with the scaling of their skins.

== Early life ==
Ambystoma granulosum is subject to high mortality rates in early stages of development in nature due to insufficient nutrition and anthropogenic factors such as contamination and habitat degradation. The larvae display distinct changes in feeding patterns with increasing age, preferring smaller prey (e.g., A. glabra) in early larval stages and larger prey (e.g., S. vetulus and D. pulex) in later weeks. Low natural availability of prey in the wild lead to food deficiencies and increased early stage mortality.

== Distribution ==
The species is endemic to a small area of central Mexico close to and just to the northwest of Toluca in Mexico State, at an altitude of around 3,000 m (9,843 ft). Its population size is unknown.
