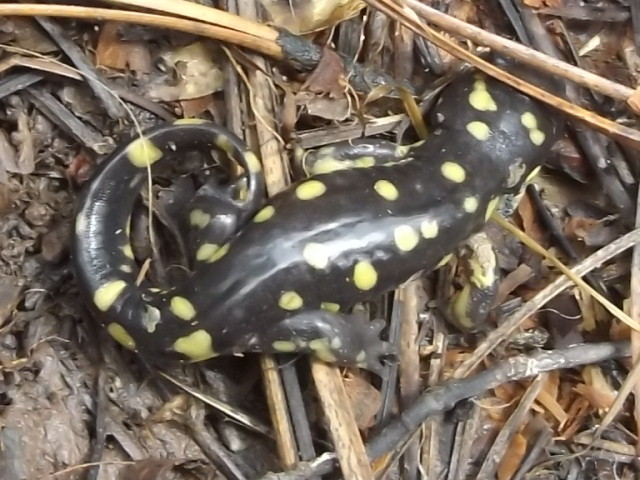

Conservation status
- Least Concern (IUCN 3.1)

Scientific classification
- Kingdom: Animalia
- Phylum: Chordata
- Class: Amphibia
- Order: Urodela
- Family: Ambystomatidae
- Genus: Ambystoma
- Species: A. rosaceum

Binomial name
- Ambystoma rosaceum Taylor, 1941

= Tarahumara salamander =

Species of amphibian

The Tarahumara salamander (Ambystoma rosaceum) is a freshwater species of mole salamander in the family Ambystomatidae, endemic to Mexico. Its natural habitats are temperate forest, subtropical or tropical moist montane forest, subtropical or tropical high-altitude grassland, rivers, freshwater marshes, pastureland, and ponds.

The Tarahumara salamander may actually be two different species separated by the Sierra Madre Occidental in northwestern Mexico. It is classified as Least Concern on the IUCN Red List, but habitat loss, introduced predatory fish, and increasing agriculture in the area pose threats to its survival. The Government of Mexico classifies it as PR, meaning Special Protection.

== Description ==
The Tarhumara salamander is a medium-sized salamander with a maximum snout to vent length of about 80 mm (3.1 in) and a tail of about 73 mm (2.9 in). Females have longer bodies and shorter tails than males. Newly-hatched larvae are a uniform brownish-black, older larvae have rows of yellow and black mottling and most terrestrial adults have large spots or streaks of yellow on a dark background, though some are plain. Some individuals are paedomorphic and do not pass through metamorphosis to the terrestrial adult state but remain as aquatic, gilled paedomorphs. This happens most often in montane streams and ponds.

== Distribution and habitat ==
The Tarhumara salamander is endemic to Mexico where it occurs in the Sierra Madre Occidental mountain range at elevations of 1,675 to 3,100 metres (5,495 to 10,171 ft) above sea level. It can also be found in corners of Arizona, in the Huachuca Mountains in the Coronado National Forest, where it is threatened by a border barrier. It is an adaptable species and generally occurs in pine and pine-oak forest with small, slow moving streams, or near springs and ponds. It is also found in thornscrub and tropical deciduous forest in some areas, and on farms and ranches where it sometimes breeds in cattle ponds.

== Status ==
This salamander is listed as being of "Least Concern" by the IUCN as its population seems stable. It has a wide distribution and presumed large population, and does not appear to be declining fast enough to qualify to be listed in a more threatened category.
