= Durango salamander =

Conservation status
- Data Deficient (IUCN 3.1)

Scientific classification
- Domain: Eukaryota
- Kingdom: Animalia
- Phylum: Chordata
- Class: Amphibia
- Order: Urodela
- Family: Ambystomatidae
- Genus: Ambystoma
- Species: A. silvense

Binomial name
- Ambystoma silvense Webb, 2004

Synonyms
- Ambystoma silvensis Webb, 2004

Species of amphibian

The Durango salamander, or pine wood salamander (Ambystoma silvense), is a mole salamander. It is endemic to Mexico, where it is found in Durango and Chihuahua states. Its habitats include ponds, shallow lakes, and pine-oak forests.
