= Ambystoma quetzalcoatli =

Ambystoma quetzalcoatli Temporal range: late Pliocene, ~4.59–4.2 Ma

Scientific classification
- Kingdom: Animalia
- Phylum: Chordata
- Class: Amphibia
- Order: Urodela
- Family: Ambystomatidae
- Genus: Ambystoma
- Species: †A. quetzalcoatli

Binomial name
- †Ambystoma quetzalcoatli Herrera-Flores & Velasco-de León, 2026

Extinct amphibian species

Ambystoma quetzalcoatli is an extinct species of salamander in the family Ambystomatidae. It is known from several articulated skeletons of juveniles to adult individuals, found in the late Pliocene Atotonilco el Grande Formation of Mexico (~4.5 million years ago). A. quetzalcoatli is the oldest instance of the genus Ambystoma in this country, as well as the one known from the most complete remains.

== Discovery and naming ==
A. quetzalcoatli type locality in Atotonilco el Grande, Mexico

The Ambystoma quetzalcoatli fossil material was discovered in the early 2000s by a team of paleobotanists from the National Autonomous University of Mexico (UNAM). At least twelve specimens were collected from the Sanctorum fossil site, representing outcrops of the Atotonilco el Grande Formation, in Atotonilco el Grande of Hidalgo, Mexico. The fossils are housed in the UNAM paleontology collections, where they are permanently accessioned as specimens CFZ-ST 129, 590, 787, 813, 981, 1232, 1233, 1234, 1616, 1738, 1824, and 1880. The specimen range in maturity from juveniles to adults. Some are nearly complete, while others only preserve isolated fragments or impressions. These remains were preliminarily addressed by Argelia Solórzano-Aguilera (2007) in an unpublished bachelor's thesis. Solórzano-Aguilera identified the remains as belonging to the genus Ambystoma, referencing the distinct morphology of the frontal, prefrontal, and pterygoid bones, in addition to the shape of the vomerine teeth (making up part of the palatal dentition). Further taxonomic work was not conducted at that time.

In 2026, Jorge A. Herrera-Flores and María Patricia Velasco-de León described Ambystoma quetzalcoatli as a new extinct species of Ambystoma based on these fossil remains, establishing CFZ-ST 1233 —the skull, anterior portion of the vertebral column, pectoral girdle, and forelimbs of an adult individual—as the holotype specimen. The remaining eleven specimens were considered as part of the species hypodigm. The abundance of available material makes it the most complete fossil representative of Ambystoma in Mexico. The specific name, quetzalcoatli, references Quetzalcóatl, the feathered serpent deity in Aztec culture. These myths regard Quetzalcóatl as the brother of Xólotl, the latter of whom is the namesake of axolotls (modern Mexican salamanders, Ambystoma mexicanum).
