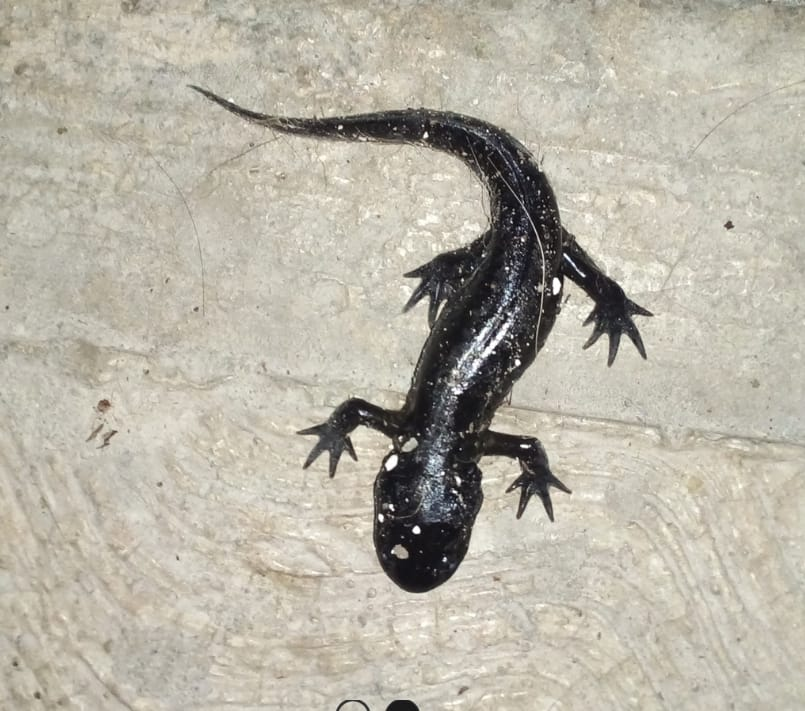

Conservation status
- Endangered (IUCN 3.1)

Scientific classification
- Kingdom: Animalia
- Phylum: Chordata
- Class: Amphibia
- Order: Urodela
- Family: Ambystomatidae
- Genus: Ambystoma
- Species: A. lermaense

Binomial name
- Ambystoma lermaense (Taylor, 1940)

= Lake Lerma salamander =

Species of amphibian

The Lake Lerma salamander (Ambystoma lermaense) is an extremely rare, occasionally neotenic mole salamander species from Mexico.

== Description ==
The Lake Lerma salamander was first described by herpetologist Edward Harrison Taylor from a holotype found east of Toluca in 1940. Its habitat is the Lerma River and Lake Lerma in the Toluca Valley in the central highland of Mexico in an altitude of 2800–3000m asl. Drainage of the marshes destroyed almost the whole Lake Lerma wetlands complex with the consequence that this species became locally extinct in that area. Pollution and the building of dams at the Lerma River in the Almoloya region along the villages Tenango, Santa Maria, Jajalpa and San Pedro, as well as domestic consumption, led also to a catastrophic decline of the populations. This species is listed in Appendix II CITES and as Endangered in the IUCN red list due to the lack of information according to its occurrence. Additionally, according to the results obtained from the study by Xochitl Aguilar-Miguel et al., it was established that ex-situ reproduction was possible in Ambystoma Lermaense under laboratory conditions, which could be used as a conservation strategy for this species through hormonal stimulation with Human Chorionic Gonadotropin (hCG).
