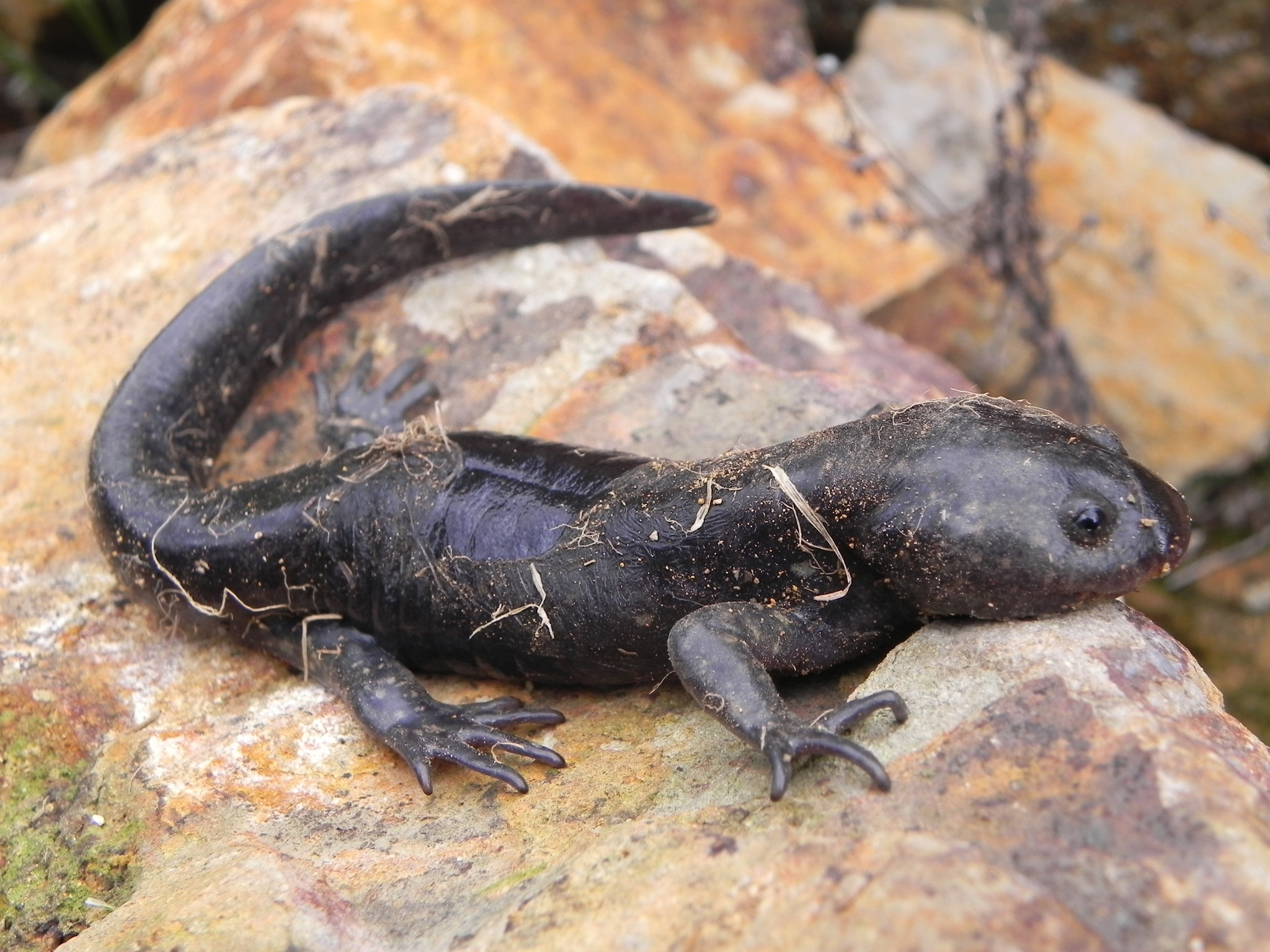

Conservation status
- Endangered (IUCN 3.1)

Scientific classification
- Kingdom: Animalia
- Phylum: Chordata
- Class: Amphibia
- Order: Urodela
- Family: Ambystomatidae
- Genus: Ambystoma
- Species: A. rivulare

Binomial name
- Ambystoma rivulare Taylor, 1940

= Ambystoma rivulare =

Species of amphibian

Ambystoma rivulare, commonly referred to as the Toluca stream siredon, is a species of salamander in the family Ambystomatidae. The species is endemic to the border of the states of México and Michoacán in Mexico.

The species can be found in ~ 5 discrete locations, living in slow moving streams through forests dominated by Pinus hartwegii and Abies religiosa. Individuals of A. rivulare continue to live in the river they hatch for their entire lives. The area of Mexico it lives is among the most disturbed in the country, and it has been adversely impacted by the loss of streams, pollution, and the introduction of non-native predatory fish, especially trout.

The diet of Ambystoma rivulare larvae, who continue to prey on the same organisms as they grow, is almost entirely made up of ostracods, with the crustaceans making up about 90% of their diet. Nematodes are also occasionally taken. The lack of diversity in their diet likely puts them in a precarious situation should environmental factors endanger the ostracod population in their habitat.
