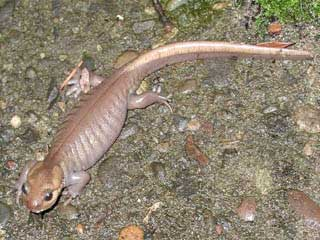

Conservation status
- Least Concern (IUCN 3.1)

Scientific classification
- Kingdom: Animalia
- Phylum: Chordata
- Class: Amphibia
- Order: Urodela
- Family: Ambystomatidae
- Genus: Ambystoma
- Species: A. gracile

Binomial name
- Ambystoma gracile (Baird, 1859)

= Northwestern salamander =

Species of amphibian

The northwestern salamander (Ambystoma gracile) is a species of mole salamander that inhabits the northwest Pacific coast of North America. These fairly large salamanders grow to 8.7 in (220 mm) in length. It is found from southeastern Alaska on May Island, through Washington and Oregon south to the mouth of the Gualala River, Sonoma County, California. It occurs from sea level to the timberline, but not east of the Cascade Divide. Its range includes Vancouver Island in British Columbia and The San Juan Islands, Cypress, Whidbey, Bainbridge, and Vashon Islands in Washington.

== Description ==
The egg mass is very firm, it feels much like a brain with a jelly layer around the entire mass. The individual eggs are 2 mm diameter with the entire egg mass the size of your fist. The egg masses are laid in water about 0.5–2 meters below the surface.

The hatchlings are 1–35 mm long with feathery gills on the side of the body. The juveniles are 16–105 mm (0.6–4.1 in) long from their snout to vent. Adults are 40–107 mm (1.6–4.2 in) long from their snout to vent.

== Distribution and habitat ==
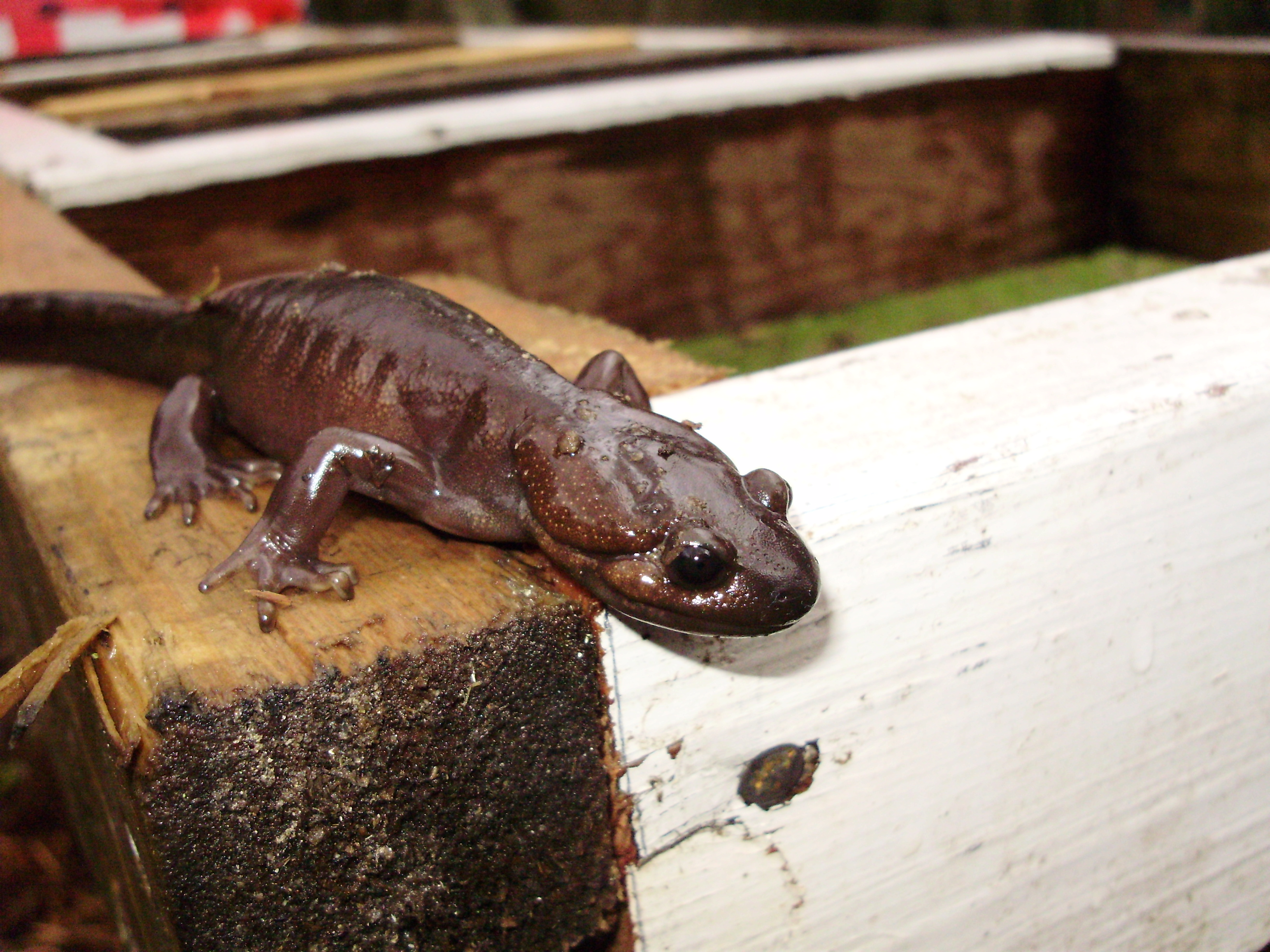
A Northwestern salamander found in Langley, British Columbia

The spotted forms occur in the northern portion of its range. A dividing line of 51°N latitude has been recognized between the two subspecies, with A. g. decorticatum occurring north of the line and A. g. gracile living to the south.

Populations with neotenic adults are widespread; the frequency of gilled adults increases with altitude such that adults at low and intermediate altitudes are almost all terrestrial, while adults at very high elevations are mostly neotenic. An example of a paedomorphic population of the northwestern salamander occurs at Crater Lake, Oregon; the population is syntopic with Taricha granulosa.

Terrestrial adults live in mesic habitats ranging from grasslands to mesophytic forests. Terrestrial adults are mostly fossorial, and are usually active on the surface only during fall rains and spring migrations to their aquatic breeding sites. However, they can sometimes be found under logs and other surface debris outside of the breeding season.

Adult salamanders eat small terrestrial invertebrates such as insects, worms, and arachnids. Larvae and juveniles consume aquatic invertebrates including snails, worms, and tadpoles.

== Conservation ==
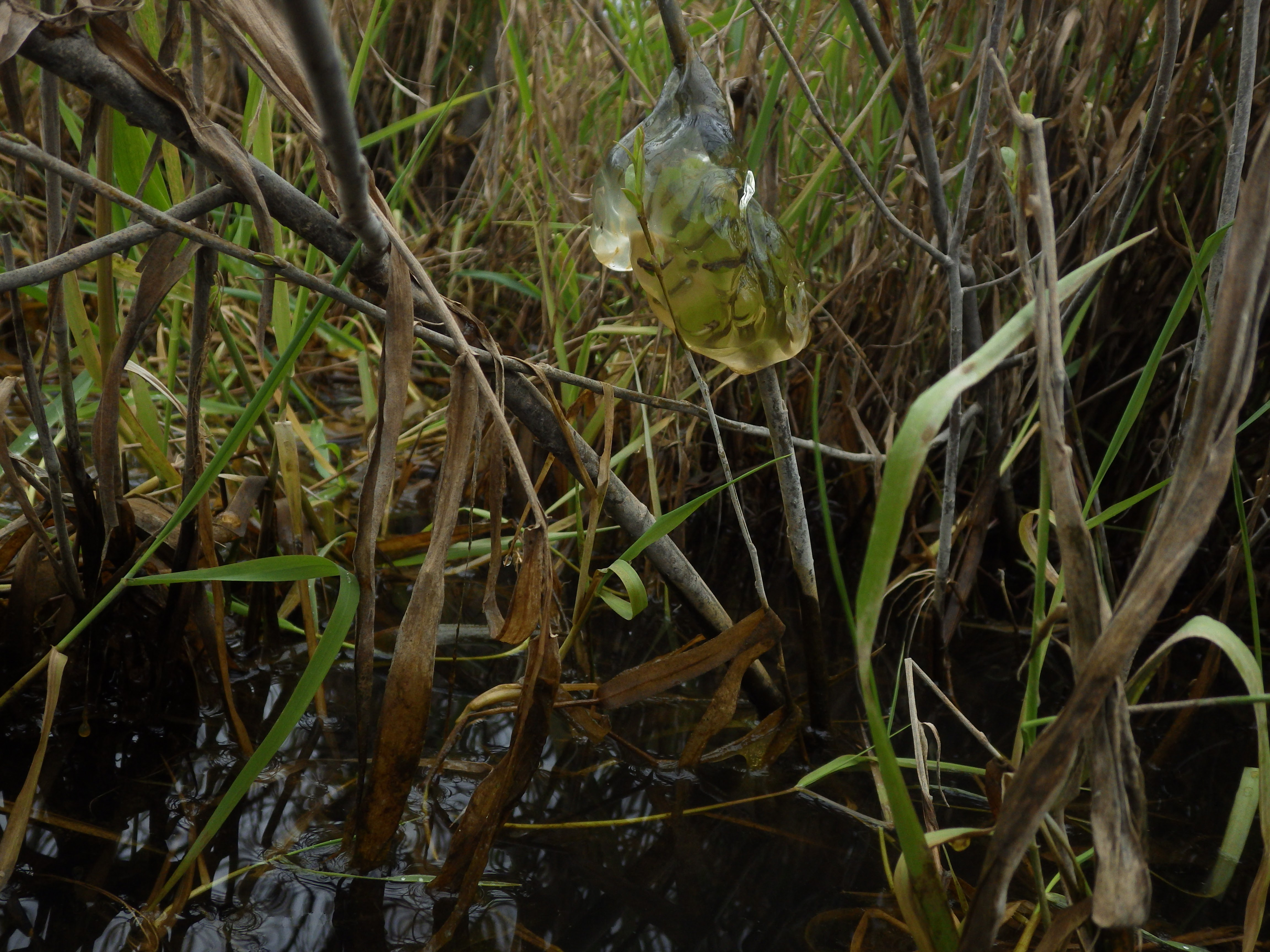
Viable A. gracile egg mass suspended above water as water level dropped

The conservation status of Ambystoma gracile populations is unknown. No declines are apparent in Canada. In the Cascade Mountains of Washington, A. gracile is far less abundant in young forests than in old-growth forests. However, a survey in western Oregon found little correlation between salamander abundance and stand age, so it remains unclear whether A. gracile requires old growth forest to thrive. Clear-cutting, however, seems to render the habitat unsuitable; no salamanders were found on recent clear-cuts. Leaving a forest buffer of 200–250 m (660–820 ft) surrounding breeding sites used by terrestrial adults may preserve optimal environmental conditions for local populations.
