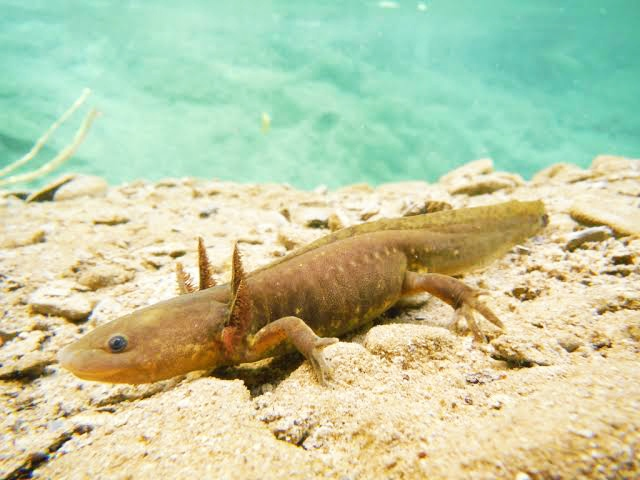

Conservation status
- Least Concern (IUCN 3.1)

Scientific classification
- Kingdom: Animalia
- Phylum: Chordata
- Class: Amphibia
- Order: Urodela
- Family: Ambystomatidae
- Genus: Ambystoma
- Species: A. velasci

Binomial name
- Ambystoma velasci (Dugès, 1888)

Synonyms
- Ambystoma tigrinum velasci (Dugès, 1888); Ambystoma lacustris Taylor & Smith, 1945

= Plateau tiger salamander =

Species of amphibian

The plateau tiger salamander or Mexican tiger salamander (Ambystoma velasci) is a species of mole salamander in the family Ambystomatidae.

Plate VII of José María Velasco's original description of Siredon tigrina (now A. velasci), La Naturaleza, 1879

== Description ==
The plateau tiger salamander exhibits facultative paedomorphosis. The adult coloration is olive green across the backs with dark spots, and white or cream across the underside of the abdomen. This species has external gills similar to those on other aquatic salamander species. However, this salamander can undergo metamorphosis again in adulthood, via a complex genetic mechanism in response to its environment. During this change, the salamander shrinks, loses its external gills and the legs elongate.

== Habitat and distribution ==
The plateau tiger salamander is typically considered endemic to Mexico, although its range might extend to the United States. They have a wide geographic distribution, ranging from Chihuahua in the north, to Durango in the south, and to Jalisco in the west. Its natural habitat is grassland, including sparse forest and semiarid grassland. Breeding takes place in a range of aquatic habitats: deep volcanic lakes, shallow vernal pools, artificial cattle ponds, and intermittent, fish-free stream pools. In the highlands of central Mexico, the plateau tiger salamander inhabits ponds and small streams in tropical deciduous forests or in pine oak forests.

== Threats ==
Ambystoma velasci is locally threatened by habitat loss due to urbanization, forest clearance, and water extraction, and also by pollution and the introduction of fish and frogs (Lithobates catesbeianus). Overall the main threat to the species is loss and destruction of continuous habitats via human activity. The main threats being logging, and human caused forest fires. It is listed as Least Concern by the IUCN on the IUCN Red List, however the plateau tiger salamander is under a special protection category under Mexican law. Out of mammalian, avian, and herpetofauna species, herpetofauna receive the least attention in conservation studies.
