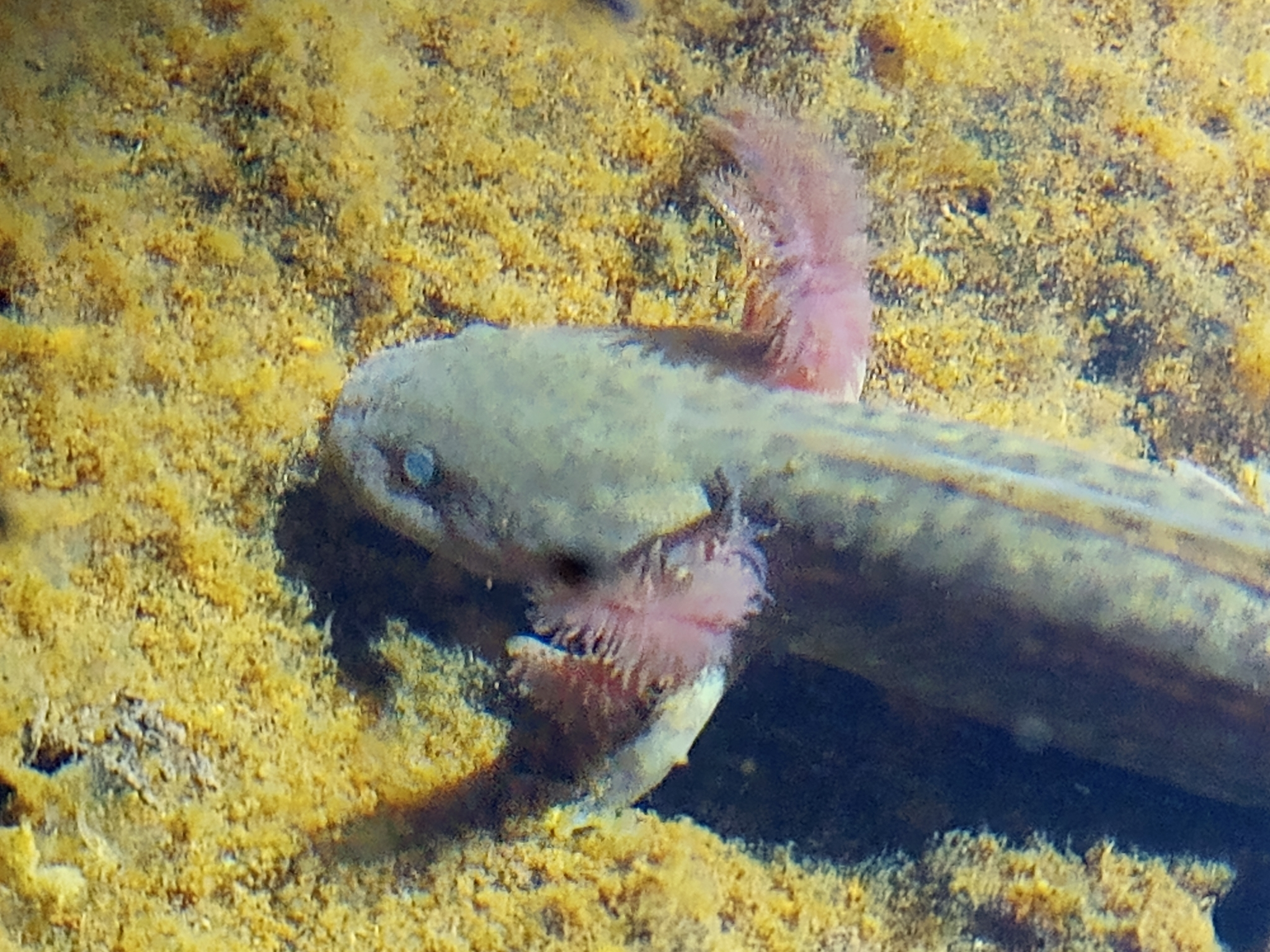

Conservation status
- Critically Endangered (IUCN 3.1)

Scientific classification
- Kingdom: Animalia
- Phylum: Chordata
- Class: Amphibia
- Order: Urodela
- Family: Ambystomatidae
- Genus: Ambystoma
- Species: A. amblycephalum

Binomial name
- Ambystoma amblycephalum Taylor, 1940

= Blunt-headed salamander =

Species of amphibian

The blunt-headed salamander (Ambystoma amblycephalum) is a mole salamander endemic to Mexico. It is only known from the vicinity of its type locality, near Morelia, in Michoacán state in Southwestern Mexico. It inhabits a landscape consisting of a mosaic of natural grasslands and pine-oak forests at elevations of about 2,000 m (6,600 ft) asl. Breeding takes place in ponds. An average adult has a mass of 6.18 grams while wet. Adult females of the species range from 42 to 93 mm and males range from 45.4 to 70.5 mm in standard length.

It has both neotenic and terrestrial populations. Neotenic populations are perennibranchiate and retain their fins. Neotenes are very long with extremely short, blunt heads and round eyes. They have relatively short, thick gills. Their coloring is dark brown-gray dorsally, with a lighter gray under-belly. They have small, dark marks on their head and back.

== Habitat ==
Blunt-headed salamanders are native only to a small region of Michoacán located in Mexico. They inhabit pine forests in hilly regions located near agricultural sites. These areas are typically subjected to fragmentation. They also are found in grasslands, and mostly exist on land. They need wetland areas with ponds for breeding. Some have been found to utilize cattle ponds with muddy bottoms during larval stages. Blunt-headed salamanders have been discovered hiding under logs nearby to ponds and wetland breeding sites. Their region has humid weather during all seasons, with the rainy season occurring in the summer. The area contains an arrangement of native grass and shrub species.

== Lifecycle ==
The blunt-headed salamander requires aquatic environments for breeding. Egg masses are laid attached to roots or other vegetation nearby to ponds such as algae. These masses contain between 170 and 220 individual eggs. Most eggs had a transparent layer of gelatinous material, a few eggs were found to be opaque. The diameter of each egg ranged from 4.5 to 5.5 mm (0.177-0.217 inches).

=== Larva ===
The larva or tadpole stage of the blunt-headed salamander involves development in an aquatic environment. The larvae of this species range from 60 to 77 mm (2.36-3.03 inches) in standard length. The larvae possess gills with red coloration, as well as a large dorsal fin. It was found that certain aquatic insects and their larval forms may be a part of the diet of the blunt-headed salamander larvae. These include water fleas such as Daphnia and aquatic beetles such as Belostomatidae and Platambus mexicanus.

=== Adult ===
Some adults of this species are known to retain larval traits, also known as neoteny. The neotenic adults retain their gills and fins, and continue to require aquatic environments throughout their adult lives. Other adults of the species are terrestrial, living in grasslands and pine-forests. They spend a majority of the year in underground burrows, and will emerge during mating season to migrate to the water.

== Morphology ==
Females range from 42 to 93 mm (1.65-3.66 inches) in standard length. Including the tail, females can have total lengths up to 161 mm (6.34 inches). Males of this species are typically smaller than females. Their standard lengths range from 45.4 to 70.5 mm (1.79-2.78 inches). Their total length has been recorded up to 128.8 mm (5.07 inches). Their tails are similar in length to their bodies. They have 70-80 maxillary-premaxillary teeth and 11 costal grooves. Their limbs are long and webbing of the feet is found in adults.

Coloration differs based on the lifecycle stage of the salamanders. Some individuals ranged from black to an olive-green dorsally, and ventrally are grey with some creme-colored spots. These spots are primarily observed in adult males. Few individuals have been found to possess redness on their gills. This was noted in younger individuals, with the older ones being faded.

Their colors are a result of the chromatophores and their pigments, and anything irregular from that is a result of a mutation that occurred within them.

== Conservation concerns ==
The blunt-headed salamander is currently listed as critically endangered by the IUCN. The Mexican government officially protects the blunt-headed salamander and the species maintains a special protection status in the country. Along with many other species of amphibians, they are at risk of habitat loss, habitat fragmentation, pollution, and predation. The habitat risks are mainly due to new development and logging practices. The primary threat of this species is the loss of ponds necessary for breeding due to agricultural expansion. Along with agricultural expansion, they also face the risk of pesticides impacting water quality. There is also risk of poaching by local individuals. It is believed that some individuals consume these salamanders.
