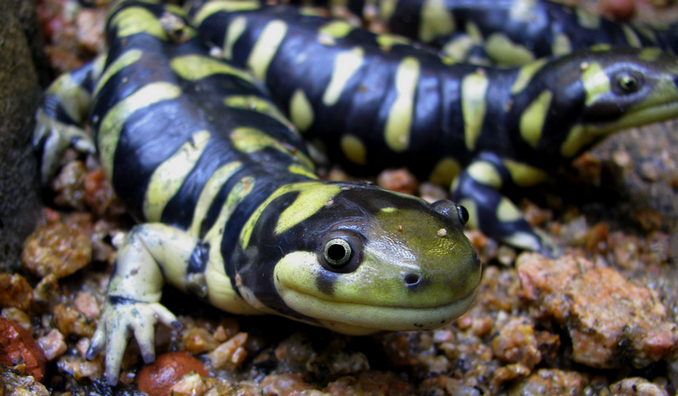
- Several in captivity

Conservation status
- Least Concern (IUCN 3.1)

- Secure (NatureServe)

Scientific classification
- Kingdom: Animalia
- Phylum: Chordata
- Class: Amphibia
- Order: Urodela
- Family: Ambystomatidae
- Genus: Ambystoma
- Species: A. tigrinum

Binomial name
- Ambystoma tigrinum (Green, 1825)

Synonyms
- List: Siren operculata Palisot de Beauvois, 1799 (invalid); Proteus neocaesariensis Green, 1818 (invalid); Axolotus philadelphicus Jarocki, 1822 (invalid); Salamandra tigrina Green, 1825 (basionym); Salamandra ingens Green, 1831; Salamandra lurida Sager, 1839; Ambystoma episcopus Baird, 1850 "1849"; Siredon harlanii A.M.C. Duméril, Bibron & A.H.A. Duméril, 1854; Ambystoma bicolor Hallowell, 1858 "1857"; Amblystoma conspersum Cope, 1859; Amblystoma obscurum Baird in Cope, 1868 "1867"; Amblystoma xiphias Cope, 1868 "1867"; Amblystoma copeianum Hay, 1885

= Tiger salamander =

Species of amphibian

The tiger salamander (Ambystoma tigrinum), or eastern tiger salamander, is a species of mole salamander and one of the largest terrestrial salamanders in North America.

== Description ==
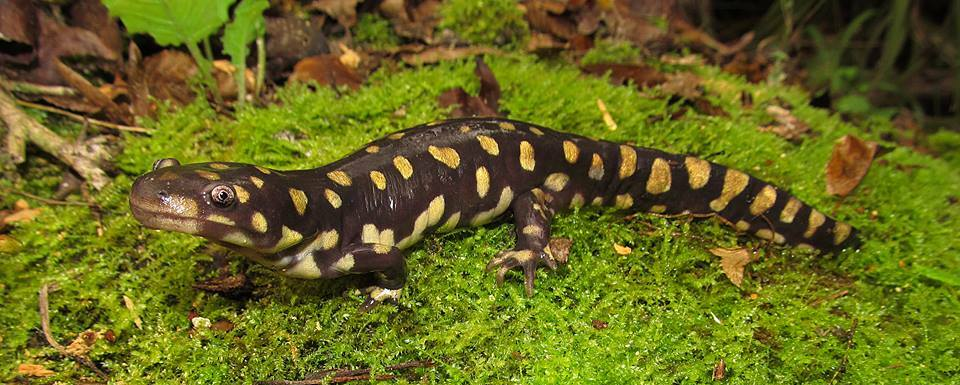
Tiger salamander (Ambystoma tigrinum)

Ambystoma tigrinum

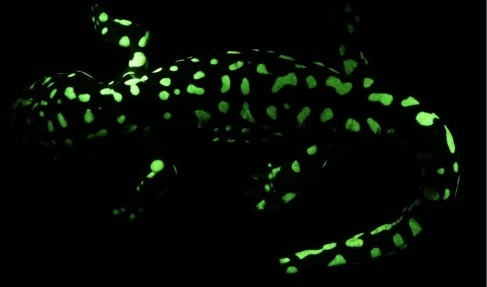
Biofluorescence in Ambystoma tigrinum

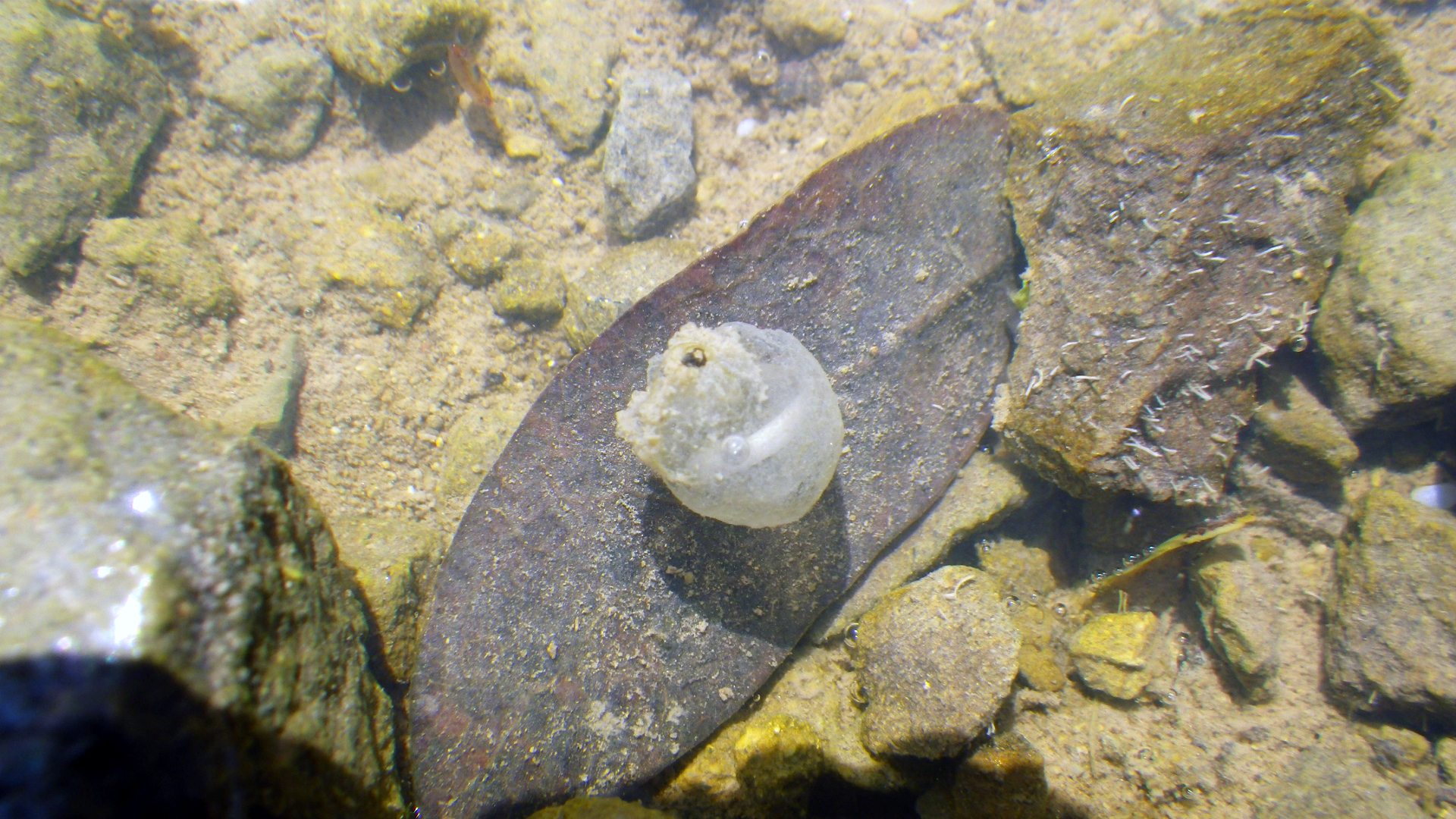
Tiger salamander egg on a leaf

Tiger salamanders usually grow to a length of 6–8 in (15–20 cm), with the longest found being 13 in (33 cm), and live for around 12–15 years. They are characterized by having markings varying in color on the back of their head, body, and tail. The coloring of these spots range from brownish yellow to greenish yellow, while the rest of their back is black or dark brown. Eastern tiger salamanders emit a bright yellow green fluorescence when illuminated with blue or ultraviolet light. They are smooth bodied, with costal grooves running down their sides to aid in moisture control. They have short snouts, thick necks, strong legs, and lengthy tails. They also utilize specialized foot pads for burrowing through loose soil. Tiger salamanders are a sexually dimorphic species, as the males are larger in body size and have longer and higher tails than females.

=== Neoteny ===
Some individuals, typically when their aquatic environment is well suited, will retain their larval characteristics and forego metamorphosis. This is known as facultative paedomorphosis, in this case a form of neoteny. These paedomorphic individuals retain their gills and remain aquatic.

== Biology ==
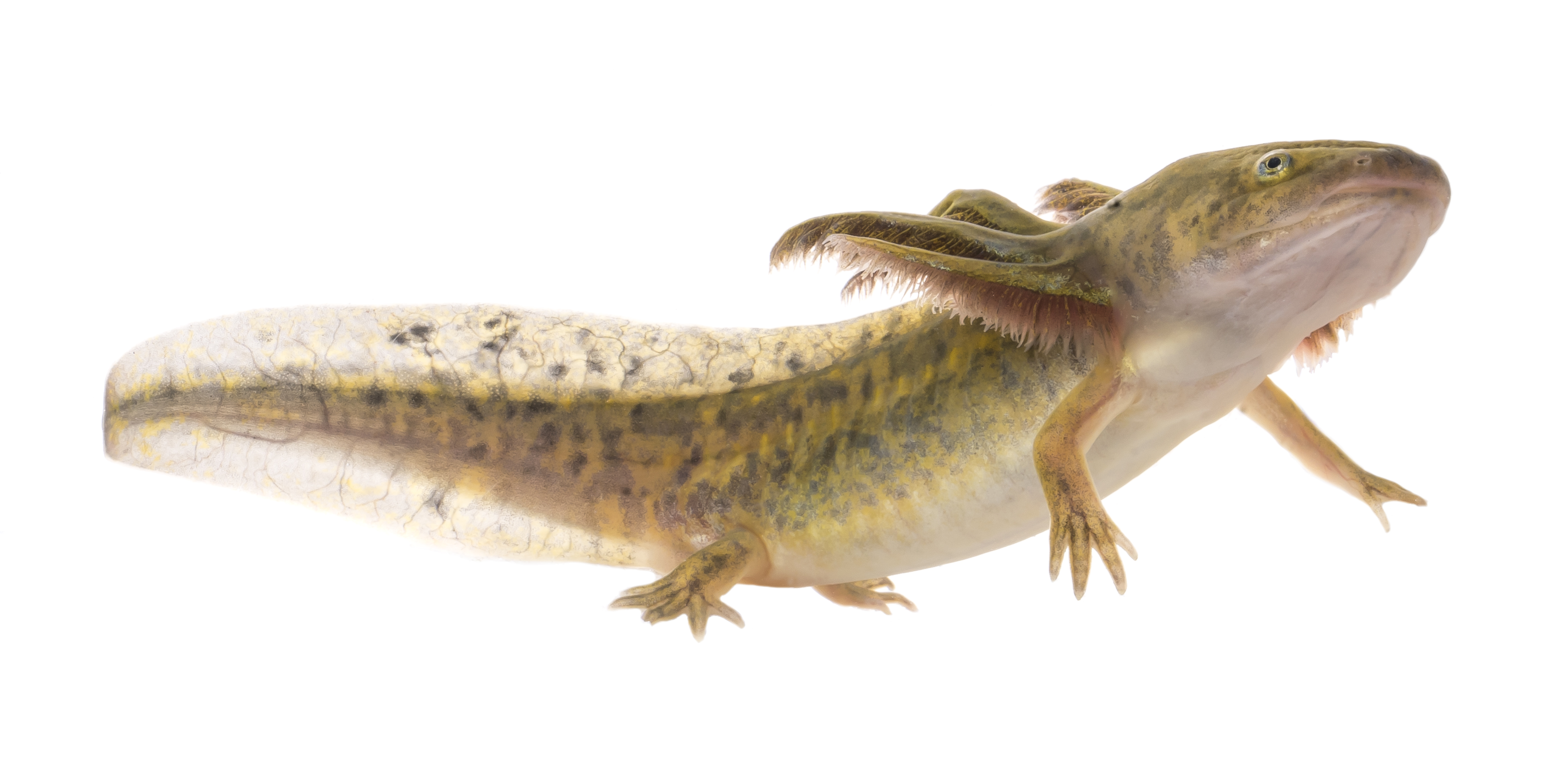
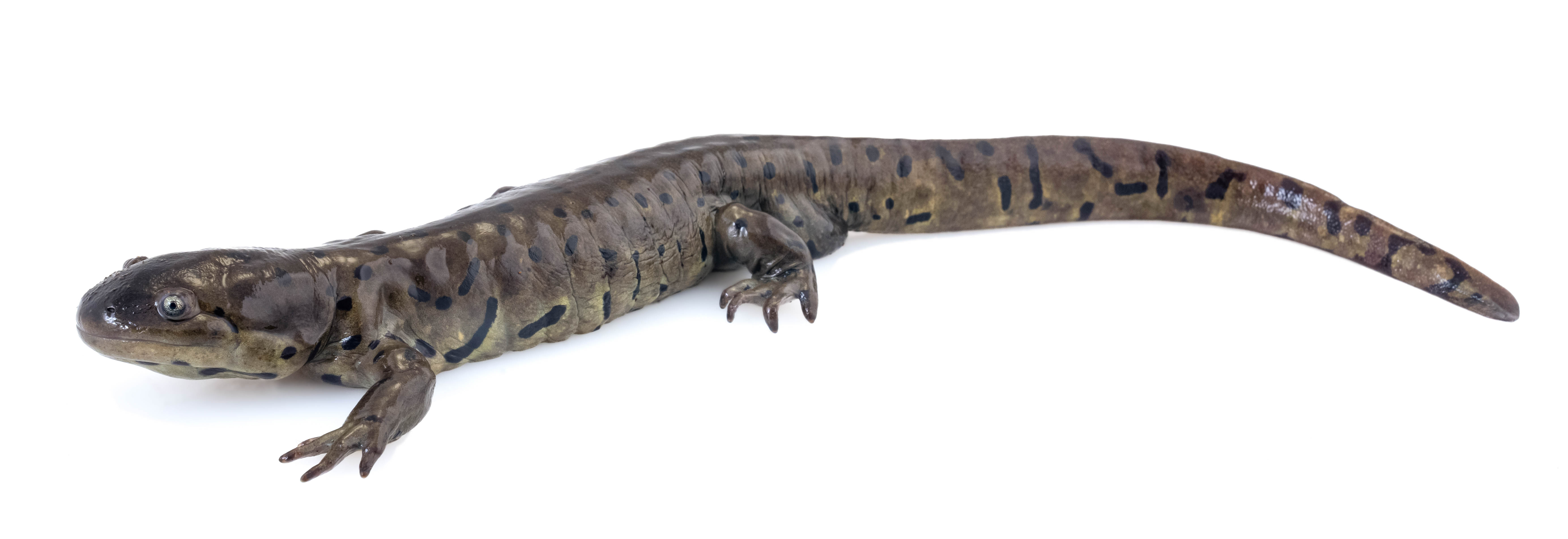
Juvenile (left) and adult (right) at Gavins Point National Fish Hatchery

Their diet consists largely of small insects, snails, slugs, frogs, aquatic microcrustaceans, and worms, although it is not rare for an adult to turn cannibalistic and consume its own kind. Cannibalism in these salamanders can almost always be traced back to a large volume of competing predators and lack of prey in the area. If the opportunity presents itself, tiger salamanders will even feed on other smaller salamander species, lizards, snakelets (baby snakes), and newborn mice.

When threatened, tiger salamanders will display their tail, which will then secrete a thick, white, poisonous substance from their granular skin glands to warn predators.

== Habitat ==
Tiger salamanders habitats range from woodlands crowded with conifer and deciduous trees to grassy open fields. These amphibians are secretive creatures who spend most of their lives underground in burrows, making them difficult to spot. One significant requirement these salamanders need to thrive is loose soil for burrowing. They often dig their own burrows, and have been found over 60 cm (24 in) below the surface. After metamorphosis, adult tiger salamanders will migrate to a new territory. Females have been documented to migrate further than males, and larger individuals will migrate further than smaller ones.

Tiger salamanders are almost entirely terrestrial as adults, and usually only return to the water to breed. The ideal breeding condition for tiger salamanders ranges from wetlands, such as cattle ponds and vernal pools, to flooded swamps. The colonization of wetlands by tiger salamanders has been positively related to the area, depth, and forest cover of the wetlands.

Tiger salamanders are the widest ranging species of salamander in North America. While they are most commonly found on the Atlantic coast from New York down to Florida, tiger salamanders have been found in smaller populations across the United States, eastern Mexico, and southern Canada. Ambystoma tigrinum populations occurring in northern and eastern regions of the United States are thought to be native populations as evidence from a study uncovered the species in these regions seem to be from relict populations. The species which occur on the west coast of the United States are not necessarily native occurring to the region and occur as a result of introduction for sport fishing bait, which has resulted in hybridization.

Though tiger salamanders are not indicators of an ecosystem, they are good indicators of a healthy environment because they need good moist soil to burrow in. In aquatic environments, higher pH and lower water conductivity have both been correlated with a larger population of males specifically.

== Breeding ==
Like all ambystomatids, they are extremely loyal to their birthplaces, and will travel long distances to reach them. Tiger salamanders have been shown to travel up to 255 meters after their breeding cycles are complete, which is likely them returning to their original home ranges. Some research has shown that females will travel farther than males.

A single tiger salamander has only a 50% chance of breeding more than once in its lifetime. In a study conducted in South Carolina, breeding migrations of adult tiger salamanders began in late October or November for males and November through February for females.

The tiger salamander's ideal breeding period is somewhere between the late winter and early spring, once the ground is warm enough and the water is thawed. Males nudge a willing female to initiate mating, and then deposit a spermatophore on the lake bottom. Some males, known as sneaker males, will mimic female behavior in order to trick females into taking their spermatophore without alerting their male rival. There appears to be no relation between size and mating success. However, females prefer mates with longer tails over mates with shorter tails. It has also been shown that males with longer bodies can compete better against other males, though this has no significant impact on success.

About 48 hours after insemination, the female is ready to deposit her eggs in the breeding pool. A female can potentially lay up to one hundred eggs. She attaches the eggs to secure twigs, grass, and leaves at the bottom of the pool to ensure her eggs' safety. In about 12–15 days time, the eggs will be fully hatched and ready to mature in the pool. It takes a tiger salamander approximately three months to reach full maturity and leave the breeding pool. The distance the young will travel from the breeding pond has been shown to be correlated with body size, with large individuals traveling just as far as females. Large-scale captive breeding of tiger salamanders has not been accomplished, for unknown reasons.

A tiger salamander larva is entirely aquatic, and is characterized by large external gills and a prominent caudal fin that originates just behind the head, similar to the Mexican axolotl. Limbs are fully developed within a short time of hatching. Some larvae, especially in seasonal pools and in the north, may metamorphose as soon as feasible. These are known as small morph adults. Other larvae, especially in ancestral pools and warmer climates, may not metamorphose until fully adult size. These large larvae are usually known as 'waterdogs', and are used extensively in the fishing bait and pet trades. Some populations may not metamorphose at all, and become sexually mature while in their larval form. These are called neotenes, and are particularly common where terrestrial conditions are poor. Aquatic individuals of the eastern tiger salamander have been shown to prefer deeper water when compared to other salamander species.

== In captivity ==
Tiger salamanders are popular as pets, and suitable for beginner amphibian enthusiasts due to their manageable care requirements and generally docile nature.

== Diseases ==
Although immune themselves, tiger salamanders transmit the fungus Batrachochytrium dendrobatidis, which is a major worldwide threat to most frog species by causing the disease chytridiomycosis. Tiger salamanders also carry ranaviruses, which infect reptiles, amphibians, and fish. Using tiger salamander larvae as fishing bait appears to be a major source of exposure and transport to wild populations. One of these ranaviruses is even named the Ambystoma tigrinum virus (ATV). This ranavirus only transmits to other salamanders and was not found in fish or other amphibians. Severe mortality of tiger salamander larvae sometimes occurs from recurring ranavirus infections.

== Conservation status ==
In the southeastern United States, tiger salamander populations are experiencing declines, largely due to deforestation and the destruction of wetland environments; pond disturbance, invasive fish, and road construction threaten the annual population. Research conducted by Harte and Hoffman in the Colorado Rockies suggests acid rain could be a contributing factor. Additional threats include vehicle strikes and contamination of their aquatic habitats.

== Related species ==
The California tiger salamander (Ambystoma californiense) (listed at Vulnerable), the barred tiger salamander (A. mavortium), and the plateau tiger salamander (A. velasci) were all once considered subspecies of A. tigrinum, but are now considered separate species. Genetic studies made it necessary to break up the original A. tigrinum population, though some hybridization between groups occurs.

The California tiger salamander is now federally listed as an endangered species mostly due to habitat loss; however, very few studies have been performed on this species.

The axolotl is also a relative of the tiger salamander. Axolotls live in a paedomorphic state, retaining most characteristics of their larval stage for their entire lifespans. While they never metamorphose under natural conditions, metamorphosis can be induced in them, resulting in a form very similar to the plateau tiger salamander. This is not, however, their natural condition, and dramatically shortens their lifespan. Recently, introgressed tiger salamander (A. tigrinum) DNA was detected in the laboratory axolotl population.

== In society and culture ==
On February 2, 2005, Representative Bob Biggins introduced a bill to make the tiger salamander the official state amphibian of Illinois and to make the painted turtle the official state reptile. The bill was signed into law by Governor Rod Blagojevich on July 19, 2005.
