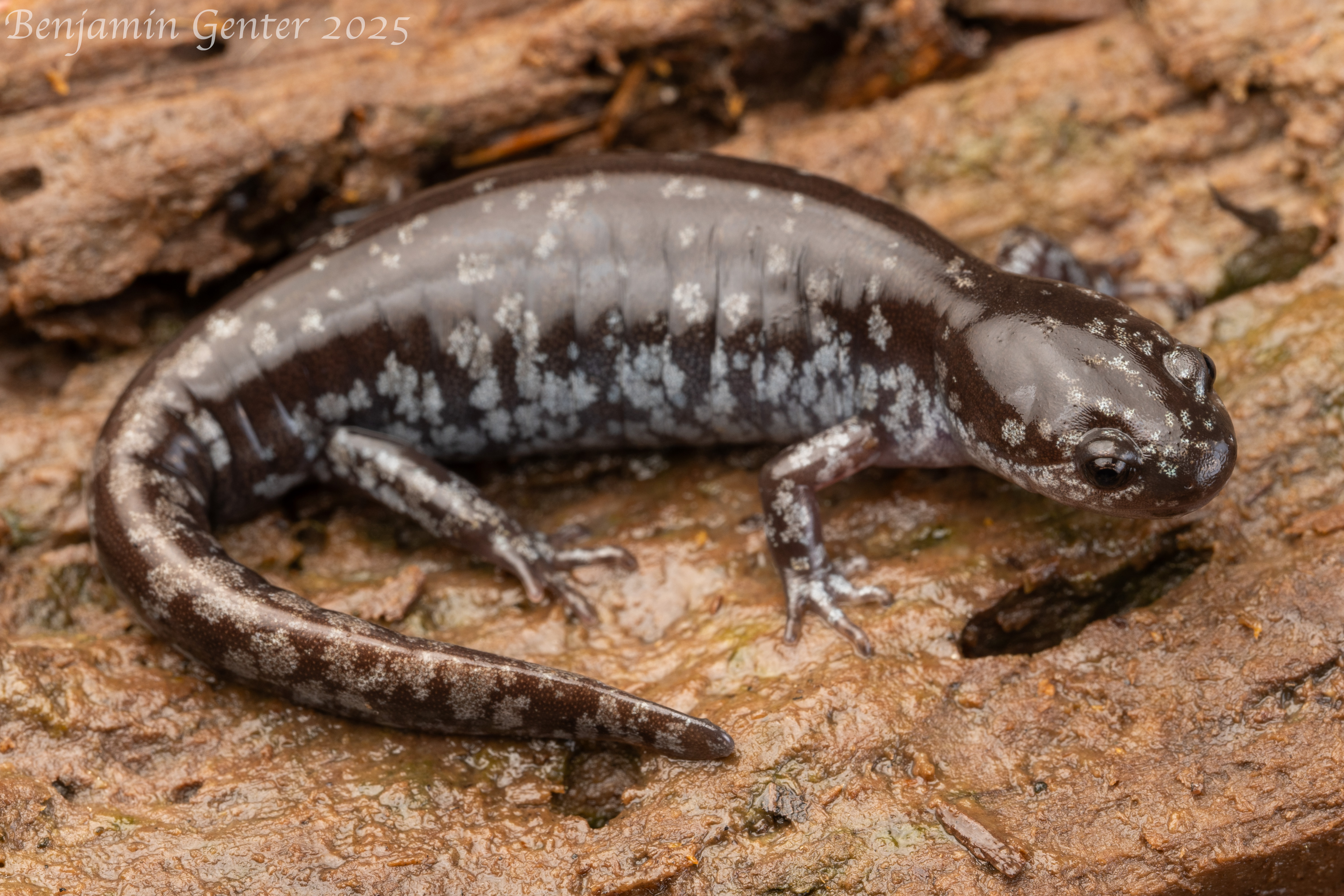
- Adult female from Virginia

Conservation status
- Least Concern (IUCN 3.1)

Scientific classification
- Kingdom: Animalia
- Phylum: Chordata
- Class: Amphibia
- Order: Urodela
- Family: Ambystomatidae
- Genus: Ambystoma
- Species: A. mabeei

Binomial name
- Ambystoma mabeei Bishop, 1928

= Mabee's salamander =

Species of amphibian

Mabee's salamander (Ambystoma mabeei) is a species of mole salamander found in tupelo and cypress bottoms in pinewoods, open fields, and lowland deciduous forests, pine savannahs, low wet woods, and swamps. It usually burrows near breeding ponds. Eggs are attached to submerged plant material or bottom debris of acidic, fishless ponds in or near pine stands. In Virginia, it breeds in fish-free vernal pond in a large clear-cut area and in ephemeral sinkhole ponds up to 1.5 m deep, within bottomland hardwood forest mixed with pine. Larvae develop in the ponds. Distances moved into terrestrial habitat are unknown, but probably are greater than 150 metres (490 ft).

== Distribution and habitat ==
The species is found in the Atlantic Coastal Plain in the south eastern United States. Its range includes Virginia, Georgia, North Carolina and South Carolina. The total adult population is unknown, but is probably at least 10,000 individuals. Their habitat includes open fields, pine forest and broadleaf woodland.

== Behaviour ==
Juvenile and adult Mabee's salamander are terrestrial and largely live in shallow runs under leaf litter and vegetation. Their diet is likely to consist of small insects and earthworms. The larvae are aquatic and feed on zooplankton and other aquatic invertebrates.

Breeding takes place in the late winter and early spring. Eggs are laid singly or in small clusters and attached to aquatic plants on the bed of the pond. They take up to a fortnight to hatch and the larvae are usually ready to undergo metamorphosis by May.

== Status ==
The IUCN lists Mabee's salamander as being of "Least Concern". The main threats it faces are the degradation of its grassland and woodland habitats and the draining of the ponds and temporary water bodies in which it breeds. The population trend is downwards, but the rate of decline does not appear to be fast enough to justify listing it in a more threatened category.
