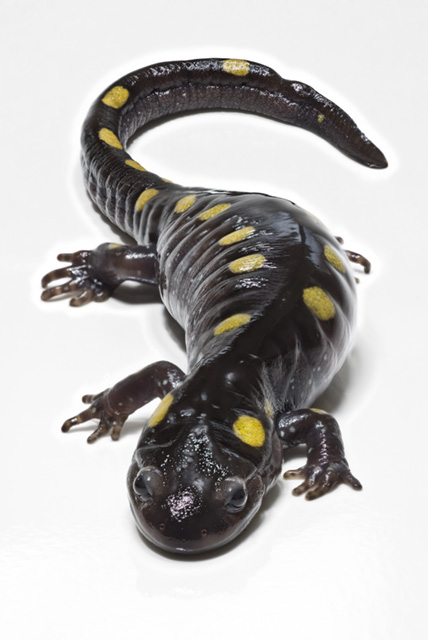
- Spotted salamander (Ambystoma maculatum)

Scientific classification
- Kingdom: Animalia
- Phylum: Chordata
- Class: Amphibia
- Order: Urodela
- Family: Ambystomatidae
- Genus: Ambystoma; Tschudi, 1838

Type species
- Lacerta maculata Shaw, 1802

= Mole salamander =

Mole salamanders

Genus of salamanders

The mole salamanders (genus Ambystoma) are a group of advanced salamanders endemic to North America. The group has become famous due to the study of the axolotl (A. mexicanum) in research on paedomorphosis, and the tiger salamander (A. tigrinum, A. mavortium) which is often sold as a pet, and is the official amphibian of four US states.

== General description ==
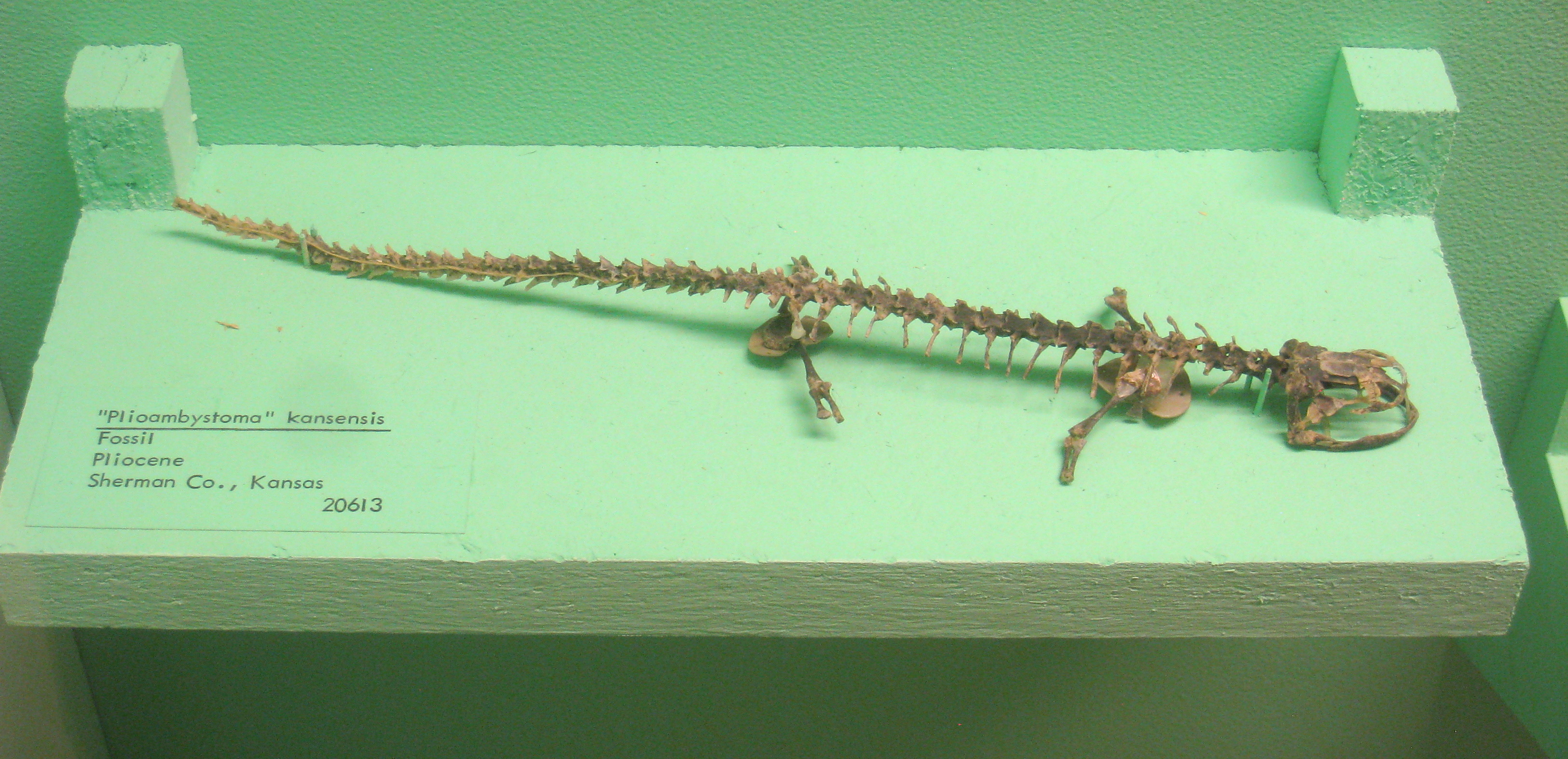
Ambystoma kansensis (Adams 1929) fossil

Terrestrial mole salamanders are identified by having wide, protruding eyes, prominent costal grooves, and thick arms. Most have vivid patterning on dark backgrounds, with marks ranging from deep blue spots to large yellow bars depending on the species. Terrestrial adults spend most of their lives underground in burrows, either of their own making or abandoned by other animals. Some northern species may hibernate in these burrows throughout the winter. They live alone and feed on any available invertebrate. Adults spend little time in the water, only returning to the ponds of their birth to breed.

All mole salamanders are oviparous and lay large eggs in clumps in the water. Their fully aquatic larvae are branchiate, with three pairs of external gills behind their heads and above their gill slits. Larvae have large caudal fins, which extend from the back of their heads to their tails and to their cloacae. Larvae grow limbs soon after hatching, with four toes on the fore arms, and five toes on the hind legs. Their eyes are wide-set and lack true eyelids.

The larvae of some species (especially those in the south, and tiger salamanders) can reach their adult size before undergoing metamorphosis. During metamorphosis, the gills of the larvae disappear, as do the fins. Their tails, skin, and limbs become thicker, and the eyes develop lids. Their lungs become fully developed, allowing for a fully terrestrial existence.

Some species of mole salamanders (as well as populations of normally terrestrial species) are neotenic (retaining their larval form into adulthood). The most famous example is the axolotl. They cannot produce thyroxine, so their only means of metamorphosis is mainly through the outside injection of it. This usually shortens the lifespan of the salamander.

== Tiger salamander complex ==
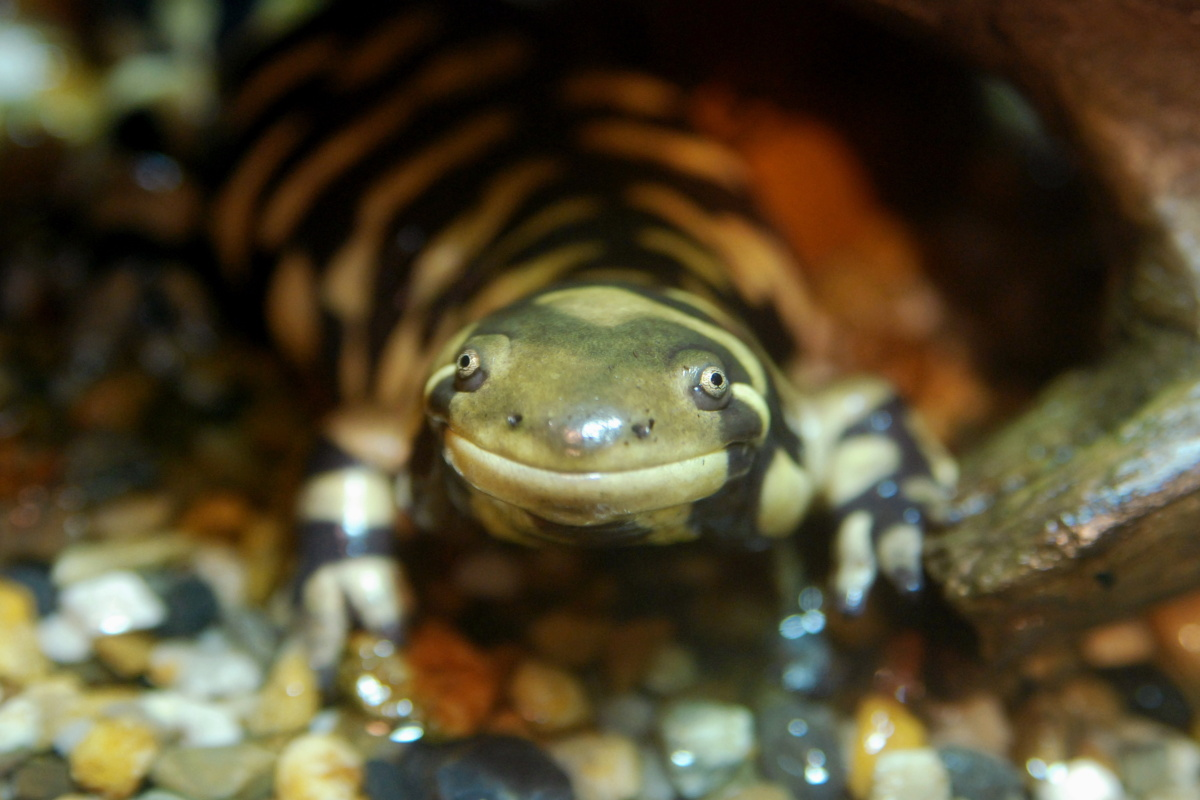
Tiger salamander (Ambystoma tigrinum)

Morphologically, tiger salamanders (Ambystoma tigrinum complex) have large heads, small eyes, and thick bodies. This basic morphology is similar across most mole salamanders (genus Ambystoma), though tiger salamanders are among the largest of the mole salamanders, and have relatively large larvae.

Tiger salamanders inhabit a wide variety of ecosystems across North America. Given this geographic diversity, subpopulations of tiger salamanders exhibit morphological and behavioral diversity. Whether subpopulations constitute independent species or subspecies within the Ambystoma tigrinum complex, as well as the driving forces behind diversification, remains an active area of research as of 2024. Several subspecies within the Ambystoma tigrinum complex have been reclassified as an independent species. For example:

1. Ambystoma mavortium (barred tiger salamander) comprises former subspecies A. t. diaboli, A. t. mavortium, A. t. melanostictum, A. t. nebulosum, and A. t. stebbinsi.
2. Ambystoma californiense (California tiger salamander)
3. Ambystoma velasci (Plateau tiger salamander), which may be paraphyletic and shares habitats with axolotl (A. mexicanum)

== Hybrid all-female populations ==
Unisexual (all-female) populations of ambystomatid salamanders are widely distributed across the Great Lakes region and northeastern North America. The females require sperm from a co‑occurring, related species to fertilize their eggs and initiate development. Usually the eggs then discard the sperm genome and develop asexually (i.e., gynogenesis, with premeiotic doubling); however, they may incorporate the genome from the sperm into the resulting offspring. Sperm incorporation commonly takes the form of genome addition (resulting in ploidy elevation in the offspring), or genome replacement, wherein one of the maternal genomes is discarded. This unique mode of reproduction has been termed kleptogenesis by Bogart and colleagues. This is in contrast to hybridogenesis, where the maternal genomes are passed hemiclonally and the paternal genome is discarded every generation before the egg matures and reacquired from the sperm of another species.

The nuclear DNA of the unisexuals generally comprises genomes from up to five species: the blue-spotted salamander (A. laterale), Jefferson salamander (A. jeffersonianum), small-mouthed salamander (A. texanum), streamside salamander (A. barbouri), and tiger salamander (A. tigrinum), denoted respectively as L, J, Tx, B, and Ti. This flexibility results in a large number of possible nuclear biotypes (genome combinations) in the unisexuals. For example, an LJJ individual would be a triploid with one A. laterale genome and two A. jeffersonianum genomes, while an LTxJTi individual would be a tetraploid with genomes from four species. Because they have hybrid genomes, unisexual salamanders are a cryptic species with morphology similar to coexisting species. For example, LLJs look like blue-spotted salamanders and LJJs look like Jefferson salamanders. Silvery salamanders LJJ (A. platineum), Tremblay's salamanders LLJ (A. tremblayi), and Kelly's Island salamanders LTxTx and LTxTi (A. nothagenes) were initially described as species. Species names were later dropped for all unisexual salamanders because of the complexity of their genomes. The offspring of a single mother may have different genome complements; for example, a single egg mass may have both LLJJ and LJJ larvae.

Despite the complexity of the nuclear genome, all unisexuals form a monophyletic group based on their mitochondrial DNA. The maternal ancestor of the unisexual ambystomatids was most closely related to the streamside salamander, with the original hybridization likely occurring 2.4~3.9 million years ago, making it the oldest known lineage of all-female vertebrates. The hybridization was most probably with an A. laterale. All known unisexuals have at least one A. laterale genome and this is thought to be essential for unisexuality. However, the A. laterale genome has been replaced several times, independently, in each of the lineages by matings with A. laterale.

== Limb regeneration ==
Ambystoma mexicanum, a neotenic salamander with exceptional regenerative capabilities is one of the principal models for studying limb regeneration. Limb regeneration involves the propagation of a mass of low differentiated and highly proliferative cells termed the blastema. During limb regeneration, blastema cells experience DNA double-strand breaks and thus require homologous recombination, a form of DNA repair that deals with double-strand breaks.

== Taxonomy and etymology ==
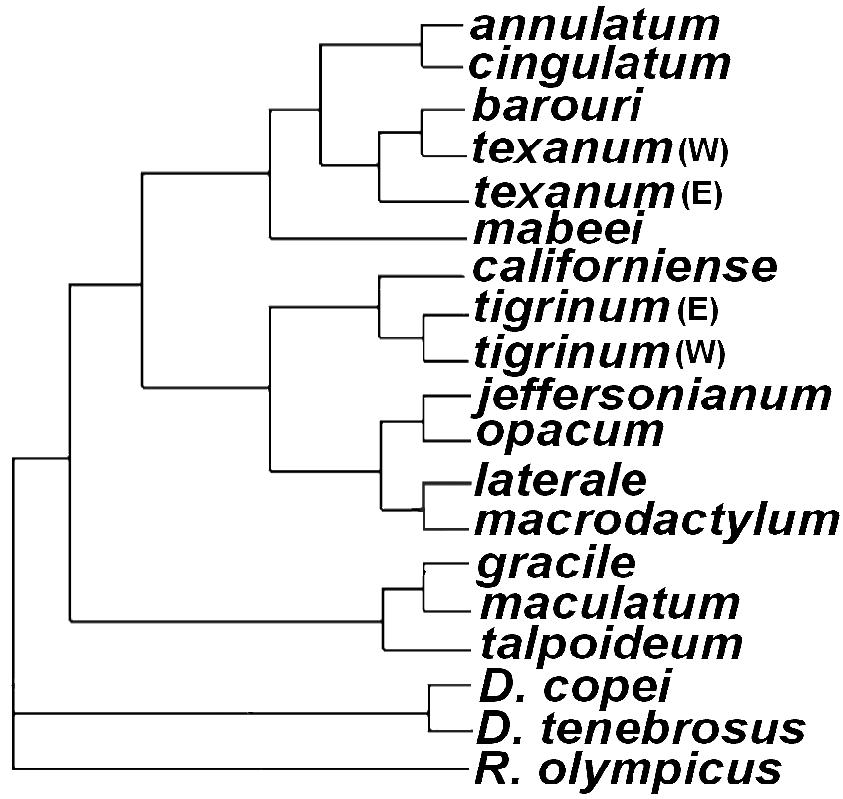
Phylogenetic tree showing relations among Ambystoma species and outgroups: For example, the sister taxon to Ambystoma macrodactylum is Ambystoma laterale, meaning they share a single common ancestor and are each other's closest living relatives.

Rhyacosiredon was previously considered a separate genus within the family Ambystomatidae. However, cladistic analysis of the mole salamanders found the existence of Rhyacosiredon makes Ambystoma paraphyletic, since the species are more closely related to some Ambystoma species than those species are to others in Ambystoma. The stream-type morphology of these salamanders (which includes larvae and neotenes with short gills and thicker gular folds) may have led to their misclassification as a different genus.

The genus name Ambystoma was given by Johann Jakob von Tschudi in his comprehensive classification of amphibians, written in German and Latin. Tschudi did not provide a derivation for the name, and some later sources proposed that he intended the name Amblystoma, "blunt-mouth" (from Greek amblys "blunt" and stoma "mouth"). Tschudi based the taxon on American naturalist Benjamin Smith Barton's Lacerta subviolacea, thus Tschudi's original type species Ambystoma subviolaceum (later determined to be a junior synonym of Shaw's earlier Lacerta maculata, resulting in the modern type species combination Ambystoma maculatum (Shaw 1802) for the spotted salamander). In characterizing the species, Barton stated: "The nose is very blunt, the head forming nearly an oval". Barton’s original description highlighting the blunt shape of the head might have suggested an intended meaning "blunt mouth" to Tschudi in naming his new genus. Tschudi's editor Louis Agassiz noted in an appended comment (Anhang) to his monograph on amphibians that there were numerous uncorrected typesetting errors in the published version. Agassiz later emended the original spelling Ambystoma to Amblystoma in the Universal Index to his Nomenclator Zoologicus. Some old specimens and documents use the name Amblystoma. Writing in 1907, Leonhard Stejneger offered a derivation of Ambystoma based on a contraction of a Greek phrase meaning "to cram into the mouth", presuming Tschudi deliberately chose the spelling to express such a meaning, but others have not found this explanation convincing and have argued that the spelling Ambystoma is most likely a lapsus for Amblystoma to mean "blunt mouth". The International Commission on Zoological Nomenclature published Opinion 649 in 1963, which placed the name Ambystoma Tschudi, 1838 on the Official List of Generic Names in Zoology as Name No. 1509 and put the emended spelling Amblystoma Agassiz, 1846 on the Official Index of Rejected and Invalid names in Zoology as Name No. 1598.

== Species ==
The genus Ambystoma contains 32 extant species, listed below, the most recently-named being A. bishopi. Some species are terrestrial, others are neotenic, and some species have established populations of both neotenic and terrestrial forms.

Image	Species and author	Common name	Distribution	Lifestyle	IUCN status
	A. altamirani Dugès, 1895	Mountain stream salamander, Achoque	Central Mexico, west and south of the Valley of Mexico	Terrestrial and neotenic	
	A. amblycephalum Taylor, 1940	Blunt-headed salamander	West-central Mexico (Michoacán state), near Morelia	Terrestrial and neotenic	
	A. andersoni (Brandon and Krebs, 1984)	Anderson's salamander	West-central Mexico (Michoacán state), Laguna de Zacapu	Neotenic	
	A. annulatum Cope, 1886	Ringed salamander	South-central United States (Arkansas, Illinois, Missouri, Oklahoma), Ozark Plateau and Ouachita Mountains	Terrestrial	
	A. barbouri Kraus & Petranka, 1989	Streamside salamander	South-midwest United States (Indiana, Kentucky, Ohio, Tennessee, West Virginia)	Terrestrial	
	A. bishopi Pauly, Piskurek & Shaffer, 2007	Reticulated flatwoods salamander	Southeast United States (Florida Panhandle and southernmost Georgia), west of the Apalachicola-Flint River	Terrestrial	
	A. bombypellum (Taylor, 1940)	Delicate-skinned salamander	Central Mexico (State of Mexico) near Jilotepec	Terrestrial	
	A. californiense Gray, 1853	California tiger salamander	Central Valley of California	Terrestrial	
	A. cingulatum Cope, 1868	Frosted flatwoods salamander	Southeast United States (southern South Carolina and Georgia south to northern Florida)	Terrestrial	
	A. dumerilii (Dugès, 1870)	Lake Pátzcuaro salamander, Achoque	West-central Mexico (Michoacán state), Lake Pátzcuaro	Neotenic	
	A. flavipiperatum Dixon, 1963	Yellow-peppered salamander, Ajolote de Chapala	West-central Mexico (Jalisco)	Terrestrial	
	A. gracile (Baird, 1859)	Northwestern salamander	Northwest North America (southernmost Alaska to northern California)	Terrestrial	
	A. granulosum Taylor, 1944	Granular salamander, Ajolote	Central Mexico (State of Mexico) near Toluca	Terrestrial	
	A. jeffersonianum (Green, 1827)	Jefferson salamander	Northeastern North America (Ontario south to Virginia and west to Illinois)	Terrestrial	
	A. laterale Hallowell, 1856	Blue-spotted salamander	Northeastern North America (Nova Scotia west to Manitoba and Minnesota and south to Indiana and New Jersey)	Terrestrial	
	A. leorae Taylor, 1943	Leora's stream salamander, Ajolote	Central Mexico (Mexico state - Puebla border), Mount Tlaloc	Terrestrial	
	A. lermaense (Taylor, 1940)	Lake Lerma salamander	Central Mexico (State of Mexico), Lake Lerma near Toluca	Terrestrial and neotenic	
	A. mabeei Bishop, 1928	Mabee's salamander	Coastal southeast United States (southeast Virginia to South Carolina)	Terrestrial	
	A. macrodactylum Baird, 1950	Long-toed salamander	Northwest North America (Alaska south to northern California and east to Alberta and Montana)	Terrestrial	
	A. maculatum (Shaw, 1802)	Spotted salamander	Eastern North America (Nova Scotia west to Wisconsin and south to eastern Texas and Georgia)	Terrestrial	
	A. mavortium Baird, 1850	Barred tiger salamander	Western North America (Manitoba south to Texas and west to Washington and California)	Terrestrial and neotenic	
	A. mexicanum (Shaw and Nodder, 1798)	Axolotl	Central Mexico (State of Mexico), Lake Xochimilco	Neotenic	
	A. opacum (Gravenhorst, 1807)	Marbled salamander	Eastern United States (New Hampshire south to northern Florida and east to Missouri and Texas)	Terrestrial	
	A. ordinarium Taylor, 1940	Puerto Hondo stream salamander	West-central Mexico (Michoacán state), Puerto Hondo stream	Terrestrial and neotenic	
	A. rivulare Taylor, 1940	Michoacan stream salamander	Central Mexico (western State of Mexico)	Terrestrial and neotenic	
	A. rosaceum Taylor, 1941	Tarahumara salamander	Northwest Mexico, Sierra Madre Occidental	Terrestrial and neotenic	
	A. silvense Webb, 2004	Durango salamander	Northwest Mexico (Durango and Chihuahua), Sierra Madre Occidental	Terrestrial and neotenic	
	A. talpoideum Holbrook, 1838	Mole salamander	Southeast United States (Virginia west to Oklahoma and south to northern Florida)	Terrestrial and neotenic	
	A. taylori Brandon, Maruska, and Rumph, 1982	Taylor's salamander	Southeast Mexico (Puebla), Laguna Alchichica	Neotenic	
	A. texanum Matthes, 1855	Small-mouth salamander	South-central United States (Ohio west to Nebraska and south to Texas and Alabama)	Terrestrial	
	A. tigrinum (Green, 1825)	Eastern tiger salamander	Eastern North America (New York northwest to Manitoba and south to Texas and northern Florida)	Terrestrial and neotenic	
	A. velasci (Dugès, 1888)	Plateau tiger salamander	Mexican Plateau	Terrestrial and neotenic	

In addition, two groups of unisexual hybrid populations are sometimes named under their own species:

- Silvery salamander (A. platineum)
- Tremblay's salamander (A. tremblayi)

=== Fossil species ===
Several extinct species of Ambystoma are known from fossils found throughout North America. These include:

- †Ambystoma kansense – late Pliocene, Kansas, US
- †Ambystoma hibbardi – late Pliocene, Kansas, US
- †Ambystoma minshalli – late Miocene-early Pliocene, Nebraka, US
- †Ambystoma tiheni – late Eocene, Saskatchewan, Canada
- †Ambystoma quetzalcoatli – late Pliocene, Mexico

== See also ==
- Oophila amblystomatis
