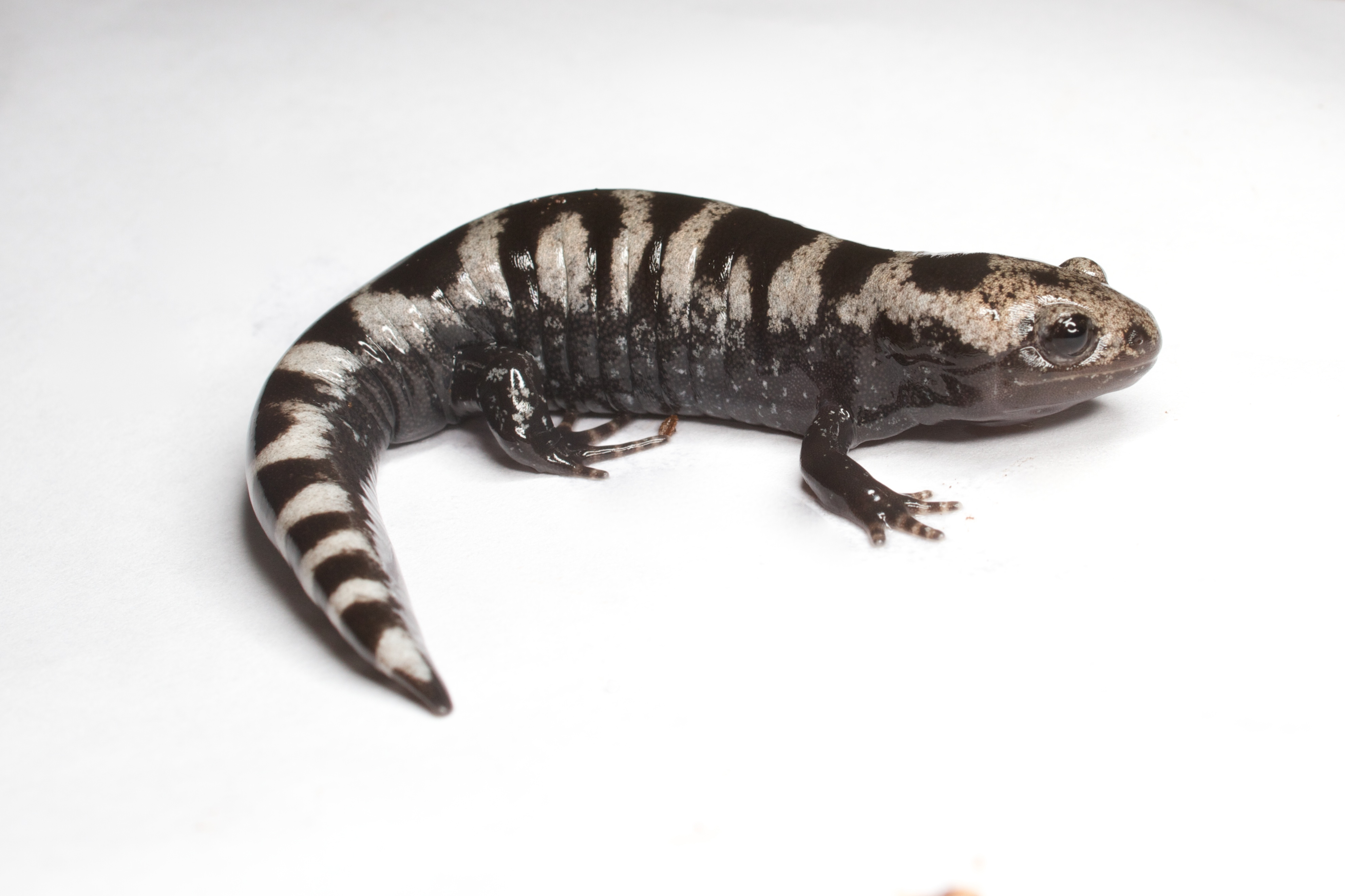

Conservation status
- Least Concern (IUCN 3.1)

Scientific classification
- Kingdom: Animalia
- Phylum: Chordata
- Class: Amphibia
- Order: Urodela
- Family: Ambystomatidae
- Genus: Ambystoma
- Species: A. opacum

Binomial name
- Ambystoma opacum (Gravenhorst, 1807)

= Marbled salamander =

Species of amphibian

The marbled salamander (Ambystoma opacum) is a species of mole salamander found in the eastern United States.

== Description ==
The marbled salamander is a stout, black and white banded salamander. It exhibits sexual dimorphism with bands of females tending to be light gray, while those of males are bright white. Males also have a larger proportion of white dorsal surface area relative to females. Females have been reported to have more asymmetrical dorsal markings, while the males have more symmetrical markings. Like most salamanders, they go through metamorphosis including an aquatic life stage. Juveniles have white flecks that eventually develop into bands as they reach adulthood. Adults can grow to about 11 cm (4 in), small compared to other members of its genus. Like most of the mole salamanders, it is secretive, spending most of its life under logs or in burrows.

== Habitat and range ==
Marbled salamanders are found in the eastern United States, from southern New England to northern Florida, and west to Illinois and Texas. Their habitats are damp woodlands, forests, and places with soft and wet soil. Seasonally flooded areas are essential for breeding, but the adult salamanders are terrestrial. Like many salamanders, marbled salamanders have poison glands to deter predators.

The marbled salamander is the state salamander of North Carolina.

== Lifecycle and reproduction ==
=== Lifecycle ===
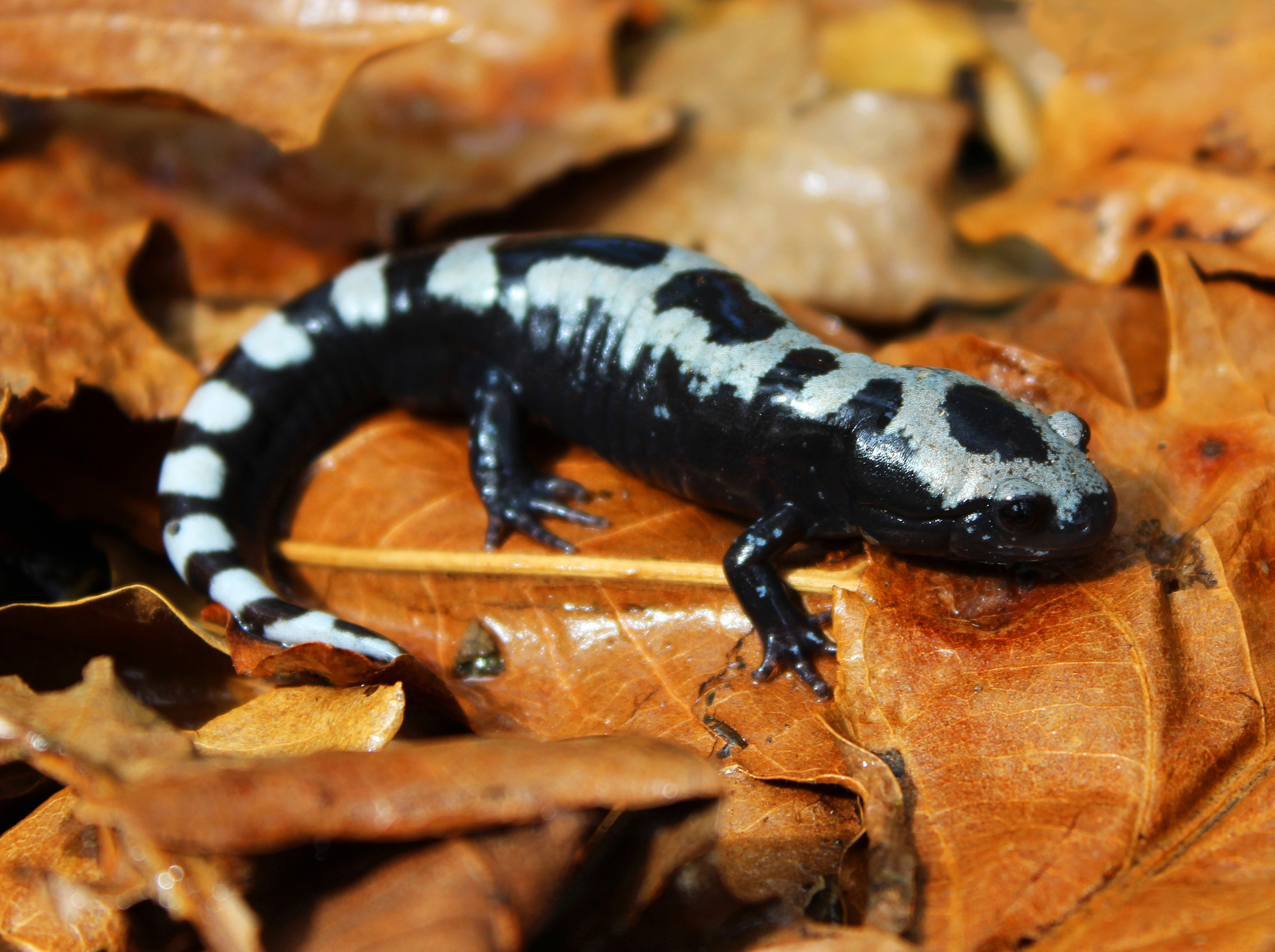
Adult marbled salamander

The first months that Marbled Salamanders spend living out of the water are the most important in determining how many will survive until the next breeding season. Marbled Salamanders are not strong burrowers, therefore they rely on existing holes in the ground for shelter. Desiccation, heat stress, soil moisture, temperature, and pH are all important factors in determining if a Marbled Salamander will survive. Chances of survival are low for Marbled Salamanders who travel through fields, however, they have been observed to traverse fields in order to find other pond areas. Marbled Salamanders survive best in a forest habitat, compared to an open field. Protecting wetlands is key to the survival of this species. Conservationists recommend leaving a buffer zone of forest around wetlands to increase survivorship of Marbled Salamanders. Male marbled salamanders have also been shown to have a higher survivorship than females. Marbled Salamanders in the northern portions of their range can also go into a state of torpor to survive the cold months.

Adults spend most of their time in their burrows or under logs, as is the case with most mole salamanders. Juvenile marbled salamanders hatch early compared to most salamanders and gain a size advantage by feeding and growing for several months before the Jefferson salamanders and spotted salamanders hatch later in the spring. Larvae typically mature as quickly as two months in the southern part of their range, but take up to six months to mature in the northern part. Marbled salamanders, like other members of this genus, are reported to have relatively long life spans, 8–10 years or more.

=== Reproduction ===
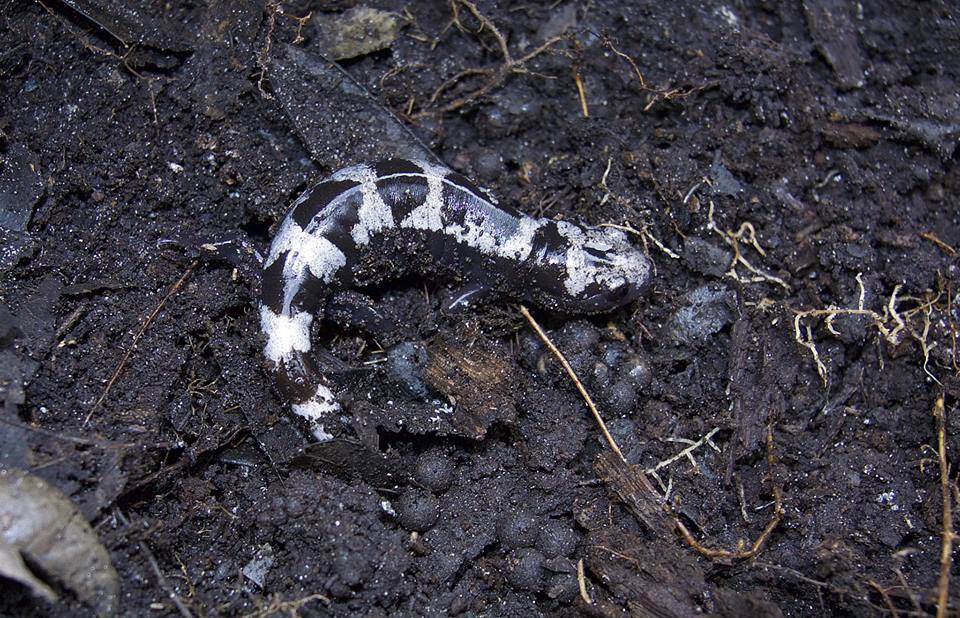
Adult female with eggs

Marbled salamanders will migrate to seasonal pond basins in the late summer and early fall where they will court and deposit eggs. Courtship of this species takes place on land. The males will compete by butting heads and blocking another male's movement with its tail. When courting the female, a male will nudge the vent of a female with its snout, with the intent that the female will respond in kind. This back-and-forth nudging has the appearance of a dance as the two salamanders circle around one another. There is no association between mating success and size of salamander, it depends only on this display. This display culminates with the male depositing a spermatophore and the female moving to take it into her cloaca. The female will then lay between 50 and 200 eggs, often remaining with them until the nest floods. One fairly unique parental care behavioral characteristic of Marbled Salamanders is that when the mothers stay with their eggs, wrapping their bodies around the eggs to form a bowl shape to collect water over the eggs. Water must make extended contact with the eggs in order for them to begin hatching.

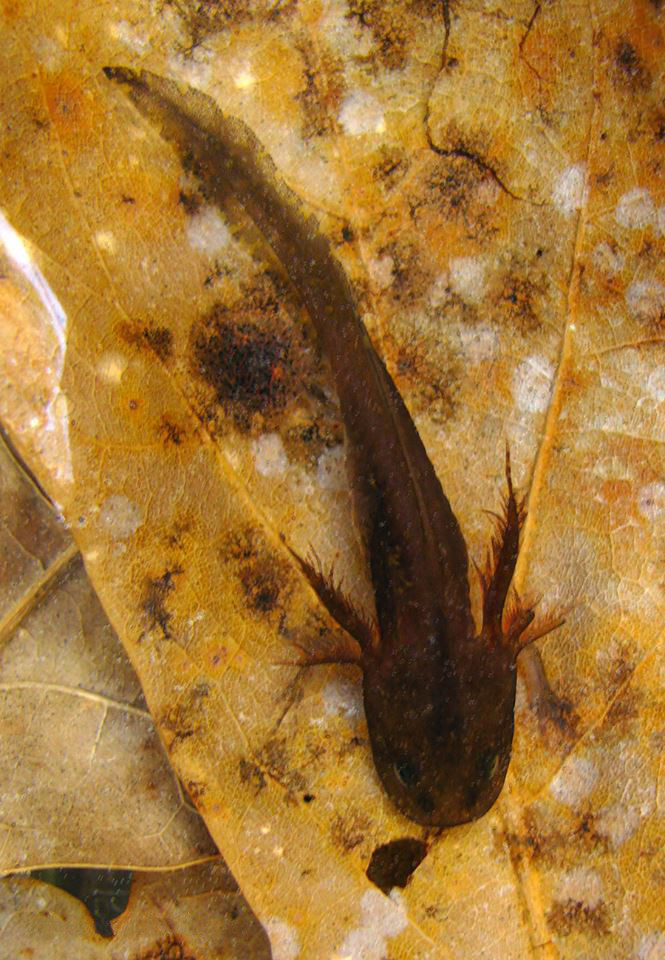
A marbled salamander larva

Nest site selection can be important to reproductive success. Marbled salamanders tend to favor sites at mid to higher elevations. The degree of moisture in the soil also has an influence on the selection of a nesting site.

However, it has been observed that females may abandon their eggs before flooding occurs. Female Marbled Salamanders have a very low attachment to their eggs, and they will abandon their nest after a disturbance. They have also been observed to abandon undisturbed nests. When the mother leaves the nest, she leaves the eggs vulnerable to predation by other salamanders, frogs, and beetles.

Reproductive success is highly variable for the Marbled Salamander. One study found that eggs laid in the deepest parts and shallowest parts of the ponds had lower success than egges laid in the areas of the mean water level. Some years many juveniles will survive, while other years the breeding population may experience a catastrophic failure, and very few juveniles will survive. These catastrophic failures occur randomly, but it has been found that they are mainly influenced by the length of the hydroperiod. A short hydroperiod is the main cause of catastrophic failure. Because Marbled Salamanders have relatively long life spans, their chances of extinction due to catastrophic failure are low. If they do not breed successfully one year, they will be alive the next year to try again. However, if there are other complications affecting their survival, the possibility of a catastrophic failure poses a larger threat to the overall population. Surviving on land, outside of the reproduction season, is very important to keep the population stable.

While most Marbled Salamanders return to the pond where they were born to breed, some may travel over 1,000 meters to locate a new pond to breed. This often occurs when their natal pond has a small population that may not have a large selection of mates. This dispersal helps populations of Marbled Salamanders to avoid genetic problems, by introducing new genes into the population. This dispersal also means that it is important to view these populations as a larger metapopulation, rather than focusing simply on a single wetland area.

Larval salamanders have been found to be positively phototactic until fully developing their rear legs, at which point they switch and become negatively phototactic.

==== Sexual dimorphism ====
Like many other species, marbled salamanders exhibit sexual dimorphism. The male is smaller and has white dorsal bands, while the female is larger and has silver dorsal bands. The coloration and size of the females is considered adaptations for reproductive success and nest brooding. The darker coloration allows them to thermoregulate easier, and the larger size allows them to produce more and larger eggs. These adaptations are not necessary in males. With how mobile they are, thermoregulation is not an issue, and the smaller size allows them to conserve energy for movement. The marbled salamander was the first species in Ambystomidae to be confirmed as sexually dimorphic.

== Feeding ==
Adults feed on terrestrial invertebrates, such as worms, insects, centipedes, other arthropods, and mollusks (snails, slugs), as well as other salamanders such as the spotted salamander (Ambystoma macultatum). Larvae feed on small aquatic animals (zooplankton, mainly copepods and cladocerans), but larger individuals will eat larger crustaceans (isopods, fairy shrimp), aquatic insects, snails, oligochaete worms, and eggs and larvae of other amphibians, as well. If no other alternate prey is available, larval marbled salamanders have been found to cannibalize their own species and even their own kin.

Marbled Salamanders are considered a keystone predator because they alter the competitive ability of their prey, allowing other species of prey to thrive.

== Predator avoidance ==
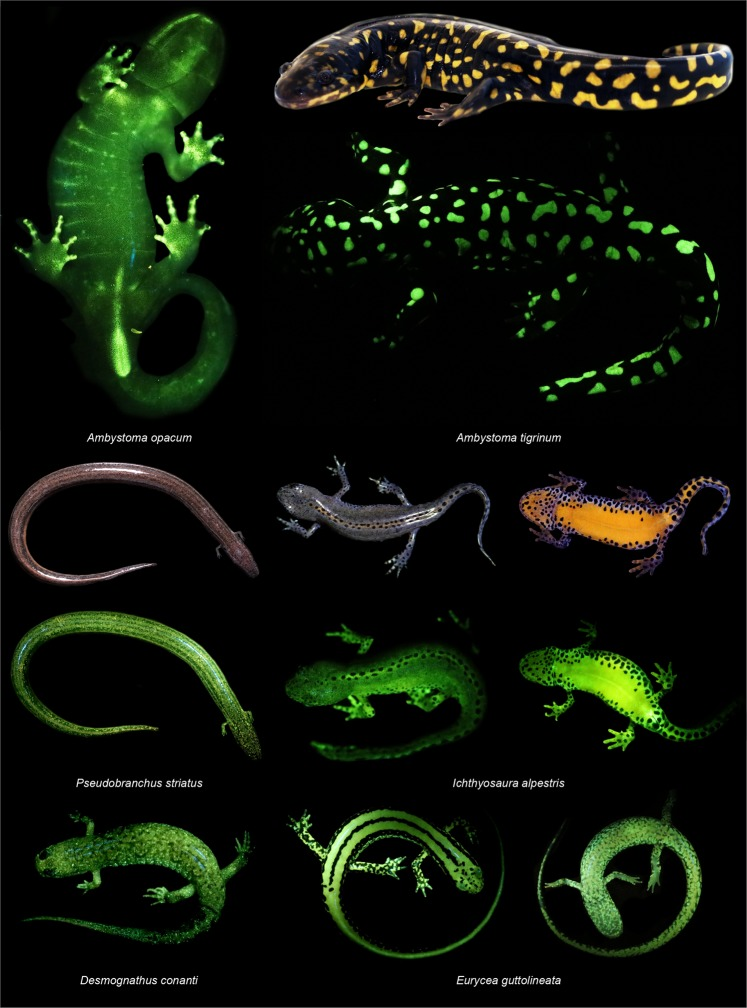
Many species, including the marbled salamander (top left), exhibit biofluorescence.

When A. opacum is under attack by a predator, they often exhibit tail lashing, head-butting, body coiling, or potentially becoming immobile. These defensive moves are thought to draw attention to the tail, which has granular glands that produce noxious secretions to protect themselves. While some predators have learned to eat the body of Marbled Salamanders and leave the tail, this is still a deterrent for many predators. A problem with the granular glands Marbled Salamanders possess is that secretions are reduced after multiple attacks, making them more vulnerable.

== Biofluorescence ==
Marbled salamanders have been found to exhibit prominent biofluorescence under ultraviolet excitation along the bones in their digits and the cloacal region of both males and females. They also have mucus-like secretions that fluoresce green. It is theorized that biofluorescence may aid in sexual selection, mimicry, camouflage, and communication.
