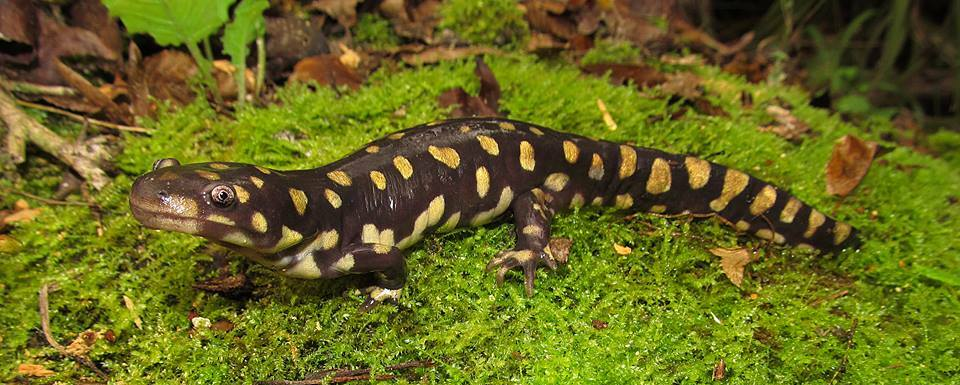
- Tiger salamander

Scientific classification
- Kingdom: Animalia
- Phylum: Chordata
- Class: Amphibia
- Order: Urodela
- Suborder: Salamandroidea
- Family: Ambystomatidae; Gray, 1850

Genera
- Ambystoma; Dicamptodon

= Ambystomatidae =

Ambystomatidae Temporal range: Paleocene to recent, 58.7–0 Ma

Family of amphibians

Ambystomatidae is a family of salamanders belonging to the Suborder Salamandroidea in the class Amphibia. It contains two genera, Ambystoma (the mole salamanders) and Dicamptodon (the Pacific giant salamanders). Ambystoma contains 32 species and are distributed widely across North America, while Dicamptodon contains four species restricted to the Pacific Northwest. These salamanders are mostly terrestrial and eat invertebrates, although some species are known to eat smaller salamanders. They can be found throughout the US and some areas of Canada in damp forests or plains. This family contains some of the largest terrestrial salamanders in the world, the tiger salamander and the coastal giant salamander. Some species are toxic and can secrete poison from their bodies as protection against predators or infraspecific competition. Neoteny has been observed in several species in Ambystomatidae, and some of them like the axolotl live all of their lives under water in their larval stage.

== Characteristics and behavior ==
Ambystomatids have chunky bodies with broad, flat heads and short legs. Tails are long and flattened. Colors range from black, brown, or a dull grey and can have brightly colored speckles or spots. Their skin is smooth and shiny. Most adults lack gills/gill slits and moveable eyes. There are no nasolabial grooves on the snout. Lungs are well-developed and functional. They have 10 costal grooves. Adult males have six sets of cloacal glands. Adult females have spermathecae in cloaca. Ambystomatids are nocturnal. Although they are more active at night, they may be found on cool days under moist leaf litter, logs, or rocks near water bodies.

The vomerine teeth, which are teeth only located on the upper jaw and in the front part of the mouth, are arranged essentially transversely, not parallel to the maxillary tooth row, which are the other teeth formed along the top jawbone; in mature metamorphosed individuals the dorsal premaxillary fontanelle, a pair of small cranial bones at the very tip of the upper jaw in many animals, is nearly or completely obliterated and the maxillae are not reduced.

Adults tend to live in burrows and only return to waterbodies or streams to breed in early Spring. Fertilization is internal. Courtship occurs in water; males "dance", nudging the females then deposit numerous spermatophores. Most species have a larval period that extends for 3–4 months. Ambystomatids can be found in temperate forests and wetlands.

== Taxonomy ==
The genus Rhyacotriton was formerly included in this family, but is now usually placed into its own family Rhyacotritonidae. In 2006, a large study of amphibian systematics placed Dicamptodon back within Ambystomatidae based on cladistic analysis. This has been accepted by the Center for Indian Herpetology. Previously they had been categorized by Edwards as a subfamily Dicamptodontinae within Dicamptodontidae together with subfamily Rhyacotritoninae and Scapherpetontinae on the basis of their vertebral nerve patterns.

== Intrinsic Phylogeny ==
- - Ambystoma cingulatum
  - - Ambystoma gracile
    - - - Ambystoma opacum
        - - Ambystoma californiense
          - - Ambystoma tigrinum
            - - Ambystoma dumerilii
              - - Ambystoma mexicanum
                - - Ambystoma andersoni
                  - Ambystoma ordinarium
      - - - Ambystoma mabeei
          - - Ambystoma texanum
            - Ambystoma barbouri
        - - - Ambystoma macrodactylum
            - Ambystoma talpoideum
          - - Ambystoma maculatum
            - - Ambystoma laterale
              - Ambystoma jeffersonianum

Intrinsic phylogenetic tree of Ambystomatidae.
