= List of amphibians of Canada =

This is a list of amphibians of Canada.

Conservation status - IUCN Red List of Threatened Species:

EX - Extinct, EW - Extinct in the Wild
CR - Critically Endangered, EN - Endangered, VU - Vulnerable
NT - Near Threatened, LC - Least Concern
DD - Data Deficient, NE - Not Evaluated
(v. 2023.1, the data is current as of March 6, 2024)

Summary of 2006 IUCN Red List categories.

== Order Caudata, salamanders ==
=== Genus Aneides ===
- Wandering salamander – Aneides vagrans LC

=== Genus Ambystoma ===
- Jefferson salamander – Ambystoma jeffersonianum LC
- Northwestern salamander – Ambystoma gracile LC
- Blue-spotted salamander – Ambystoma laterale LC
- Spotted salamander – Ambystoma maculatum LC
- Long-toed salamander – Ambystoma macrodactylum LC
- Barred tiger salamander – Ambystoma mavortium LC
- Small-mouth salamander – Ambystoma texanum LC
- Tiger salamander – Ambystoma tigrinum LC

=== Genus Desmognathus ===
- Dusky salamander – Desmognathus fuscus LC
- Allegheny Mountain dusky salamander – Desmognathus ochrophaeus LC

=== Genus Dicamptodon ===
- Coastal giant salamander – Dicamptodon tenebrosus LC

=== Genus Ensatina ===
- Ensatina – Ensatina eschscholtzii LC

=== Genus Eurycea ===
- Northern two-lined salamander – Eurycea bislineata LC

=== Genus Gyrinophilus ===
- Spring salamander – Gyrinophilus porphyriticus LC

=== Genus Hemidactylium ===
- Four-toed salamander – Hemidactylium scutatum LC

=== Genus Necturus ===
- Common mudpuppy – Necturus maculosus LC

=== Genus Notophthalmus ===
- Eastern newt – Notophthalmus viridescens LC

=== Genus Plethodon ===
- Red-backed salamander – Plethodon cinereus LC
- Coeur d’Alene salamander – Plethodon idahoensis LC
- Western redback salamander – Plethodon vehiculum LC

=== Genus Taricha ===
- Rough-skinned newt – Taricha granulosa LC

== Order Anura, frogs and toads ==
=== Genus Acris ===
- Blanchard's cricket frog – Acris crepitans blanchardi LC

=== Genus Ascaphus ===
- Coastal tailed frog – Ascaphus truei LC
- Rocky Mountain tailed frog – Ascaphus montanus LC

=== Genus Bufo or Anaxyrus ===
- American toad – Anaxyrus americanus LC
- Western toad – Anaxyrus boreas LC
- Great Plains toad – Anaxyrus cognatus LC
- Fowler's toad – Anaxyrus fowleri LC
- Canadian toad – Anaxyrus hemiophrys LC

=== Genus Hyla ===
- Cope's gray treefrog – Hyla chrysoscelis LC
- Gray treefrog – Hyla versicolor LC

=== Genus Rana ===
- Northern red-legged frog – Rana aurora LC
- Cascades frog – Rana cascadae LC
- Columbia spotted frog – Rana luteiventris LC
- Oregon spotted frog – Rana pretiosa VU

=== Genus Lithobates ===
- American bullfrog – Lithobates catesbeianus LC
- Northern green frog – Lithobates clamitans LC
- Pickerel frog – Lithobates palustris LC
- Northern leopard frog – Lithobates pipiens LC
- Mink frog – Lithobates septentrionalis LC
- Wood frog – Lithobates sylvaticus LC

=== Genus Pseudacris ===
- Spring peeper – Pseudacris crucifer LC
- Boreal chorus frog – Pseudacris maculata LC
- Pacific tree frog – Pseudacris regilla LC
- Western chorus frog – Pseudacris triseriata LC

=== Genus Spea ===
- Plains spadefoot toad – Spea bombifrons LC
- Great Basin spadefoot – Spea intermontana LC

== See also ==
- List of amphibians of Quebec
- List of amphibians of Ontario
