= Parthenogenesis in amphibians =

Asexual reproduction in frogs and salamanders

Parthenogenesis is a form of reproduction where eggs develop without fertilization, resulting in unisexual species. This phenomenon is closely related with reproductive modes such as hybridogenesis, where fertilization occurs, but the paternal DNA is not passed on. Among amphibians, it is seen in numerous frog and salamander species, but has not been recorded in caecilians.

== Artificial parthenogenesis ==
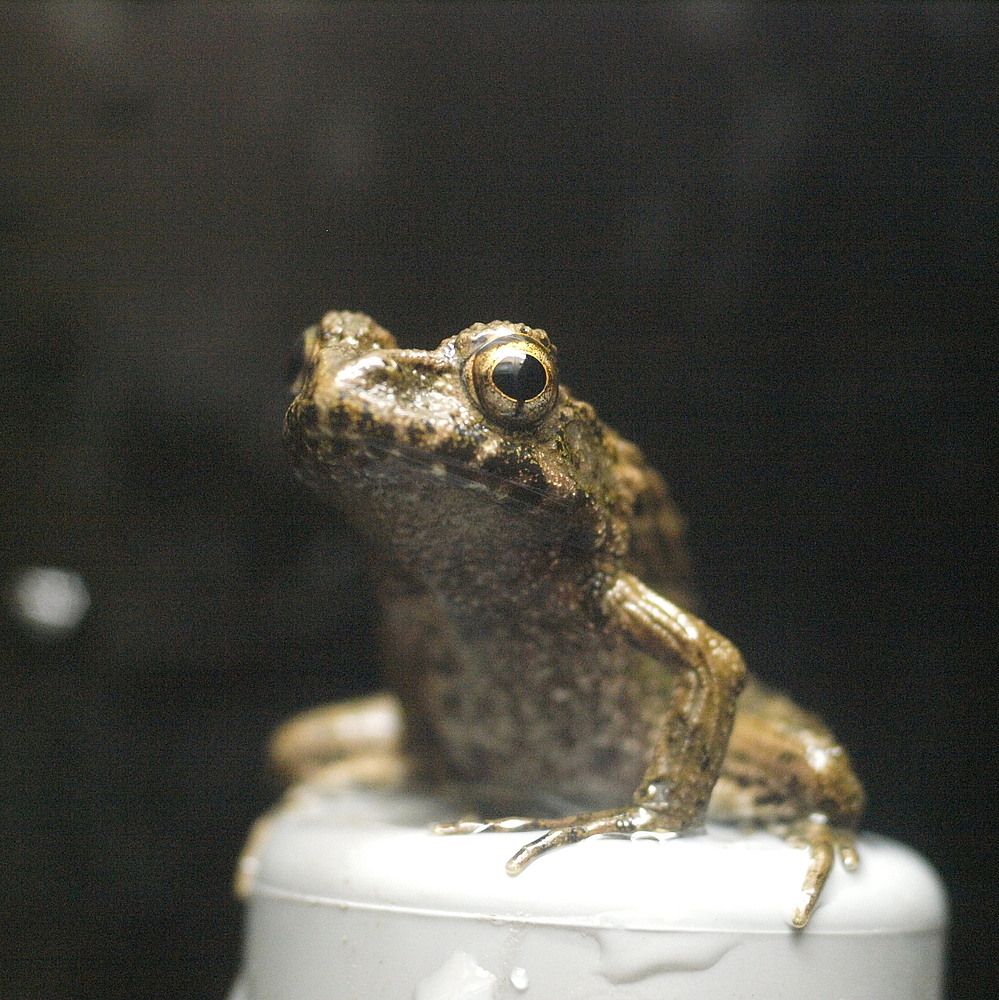
Pelophylax nigromaculatus has been used in artificial parthenogenesis experiments

Haploid parthenogenesis has been achieved experimentally in amphibians, through approaches that could be considered artificial gynogenesis. Oscar Hertwig first achieved artificial parthenogenesis in frogs in 1911, using eggs fertilized by irradiated sperm. The radiation destroyed the DNA within the sperm, but nearly normal embryos were still produced. Gunther Hertwig repeated this experiment in 1924, using crosses between different frogs. A cross between a toad, Amietophrynus regularis, and a frog, Rana fusca, would not produce a viable embryo, but fertilization of a toad egg by an irradiated frog sperm would produce a haploid larva. Parthenogenesis has also been induced in Pelophylax nigromaculatus by pricking an egg with a needle. This method produced tadpoles which metamorphosed into adult frogs, some of which were albino. Rana japonica, Pelophylax nigromaculatus and Lithobates pipiens have all produced viable haploid adults as a result of artificial parthenogenesis.

== Parthenogenesis in nature ==
=== Origins ===
Salamanders are the oldest known parthenogenic vertebrates. Molecular methods date the origins of unisexual salamanders to the Pliocene, from between 3.9 million to approximately 5 million years ago.

All known parthenogenic amphibians have been the result of hybridization events between closely related species. Pelophylax esculentus, the edible frog, is the product of crosses between Pelophylax lessonae and Pelophylax ridibundus. Similarly, Ambystoma laterale, Ambystoma jeffersonianum, Ambystoma texanum and Ambystoma tigrinum have been identified as extant parent species to unisexual salamanders within the same genus. However, mitochondrial evidence suggests that the origins of hybrid Ambystoma, on the maternal line, lie in a relative of Ambystoma barbouri. In spite of this, all extant unisexual species of Ambystoma share no nuclear DNA with Ambystoma barbouri.

=== Polyploidy in unisexual amphibians ===
Polyploidy, a numerical change in the number of chromosomes, is common in parthenogenic amphibians. Triploidy (having three sets of chromosomes), tetraploidy (four sets of chromosomes) and pentaploidy (five sets of chromosomes) are common in salamanders. In unisexual salamanders these different levels of polyploidy are a result of multiple hybridization events, involving two to four species. Ambystoma nothagenes is a unisexual, triploid hybrid of Ambystoma laterale, Ambystoma texanum and Ambystoma tigrinum, while hybrids of Ambystoma platineum and Ambystoma texanum have been found to be tetraploid. Most Ambystoma hybrids are described by how many haploid sets of chromosomes they contain from each of their parent species, reflecting their level of ploidy.

=== Mortality ===
Embryonic mortality in parthenogenic amphibians is high. Hatching rates for North American salamander species have ranged from 19.5% to 30.5%. It is speculated that intergenomic exchanges, like crossing over during meiosis, may play a role. Intergenomic exchanges are often lethal due to the fact that chromosomes in unisexual species are homeologous (similar, but less so than homologous chromosomes from within a species). Homologous chromosomes are largely identical, in this case as a result of the chromosome replication.

== Modes of parthenogenesis and parthenogenetic-like reproduction in amphibians ==
=== Gynogenesis ===
Gynogenesis is a form of parthenogenesis where an egg begins to divide only after being pricked by a sperm cell, but without the genetic material of the sperm being used. There are two known mechanisms of gynogenesis. The first is an endomitotic event prior to meiosis, where the number of chromosomes in a cell doubles without cell division taking place. After meiosis each egg has the same ploidy (number of chromosomes) as the mother. This particular parthenogentic mechanism has been observed in unisexual Ambystoma species as well as Glandirana rugosa. The second potential mechanism is apomixis, which produces a complete set of chromosomes through mitotic replication. This method has not been observed in any amphibious species. Courtship behavior between females of the same species has been observed in Ambystoma platineum, and has been posited to induce either oviposition of ovulation, though the precise utility of the behavior is unknown.

=== Mole salamander ===
Unisexual female mole salamanders of the genus Ambystoma are frequent in the region of the North American Great Lakes. These salamanders emerged about 5 million years ago and are the oldest known unisexual vertebrate lineage. The unisexual female Ambystoma can sometimes undergo genome exchange with males from sympatric sexual species.

=== Hybridogenesis ===
In hybridogenesis, females of a unisexual species mate with a male of a related species and utilize their genetic material in order to produce offspring. However, in spite of this requirement, the genetic material of the male is not passed on to the next generation. Just prior to meiosis, during mitotic division, spindle fibers attach to the maternal chromosomes, leaving the paternal chromosomes in the cytoplasm. The paternal chromosomes are therefore excluded from nascent eggs, without recombination having typically occurred. In some cases, such as Pelophylax esculentus, there is also endomeiosis prior to cell division, which means that the maternal chromosomes are duplicated and each egg contains identical pairs of chromosomes. Hybridogenesis can be described as a parthenogenetic-like mode of reproduction, since there is no continuing heredity in the paternal line . It has been documented in the European water frog complex of the genus Pelophylax, which includes three hybridogenic forms.

=== Kleptogenesis ===
Kleptogenesis is a sexually parasitic form of reproduction in unisexual organisms, that is often associated with species that are also capable of gynogenetic reproduction. In this reproductive mode unisexual females mate with sympatric males of related species, and genetic material in the paternal line recombines with the maternal DNA and thus is passed on. This mode of reproduction can be seen in numerous, though not all, species of unisexual salamander, particularly salamanders in the genus Ambystoma, and is implicated in the exceptional genetic diversity that exists in those animals.
