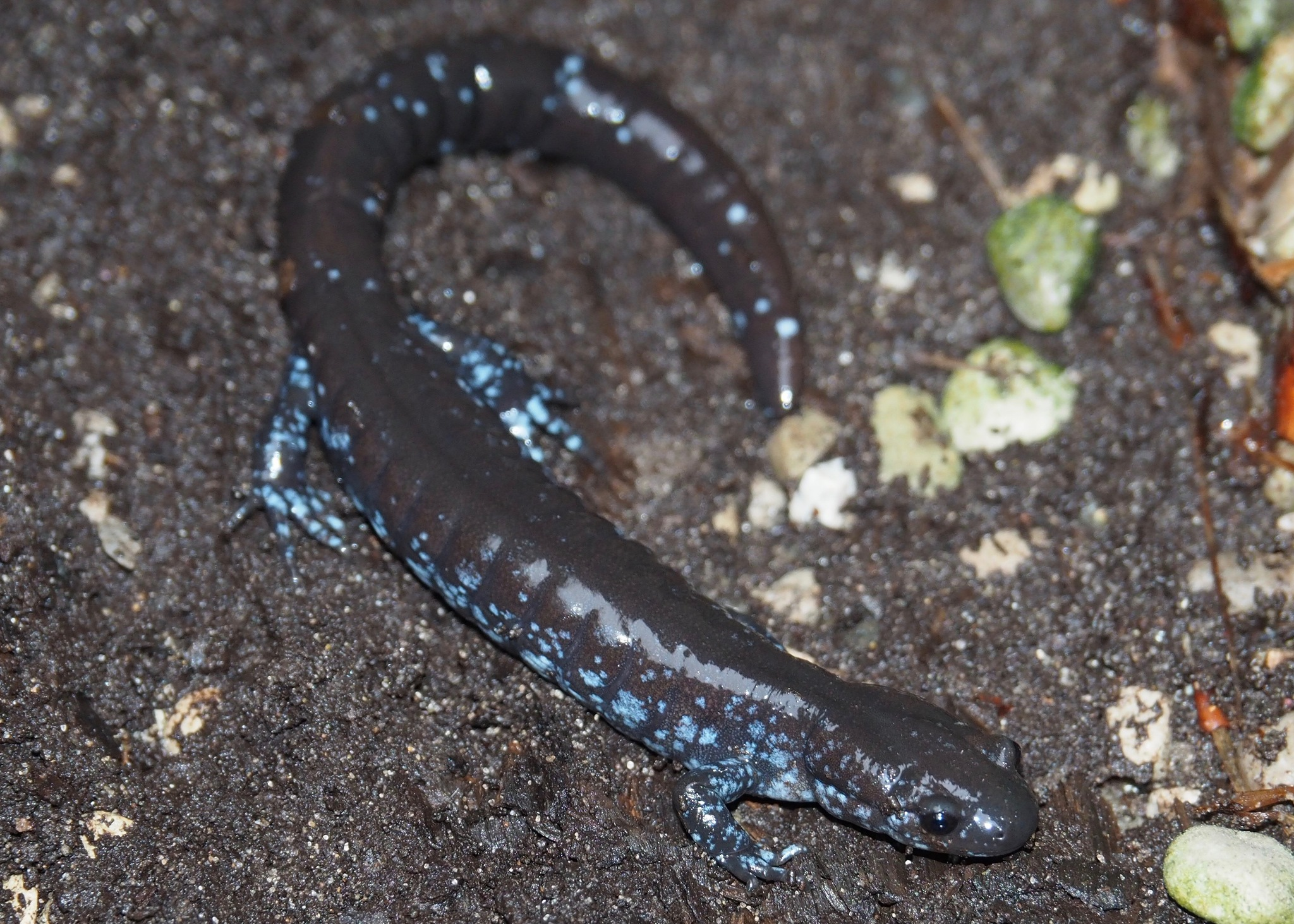

Scientific classification
- Kingdom: Animalia
- Phylum: Chordata
- Class: Amphibia
- Order: Caudata
- Family: Ambystomatidae
- Genus: Ambystoma
- Species complex: Complex Ambystoma Unisexual
- Geographic distribution of the unisexual species complex (purple), A. laterale (pink), and A. jeffersonianum (yellow).

= Unisexual mole salamander =

Unisexual species complex of salamanders

Unisexual mole salamanders are a species complex of all-female ambystomid salamanders in the genus Ambystoma. They are widely distributed in deciduous and mixed forests across the Great Lakes region and northeastern North America. These salamanders implement a unique system of reproduction which allows them to reproduce asexually, or to incorporate genetic material from closely-related species of salamanders, resulting in a diverse array of genotypes and phenotypes within the complex.

== Morphology ==
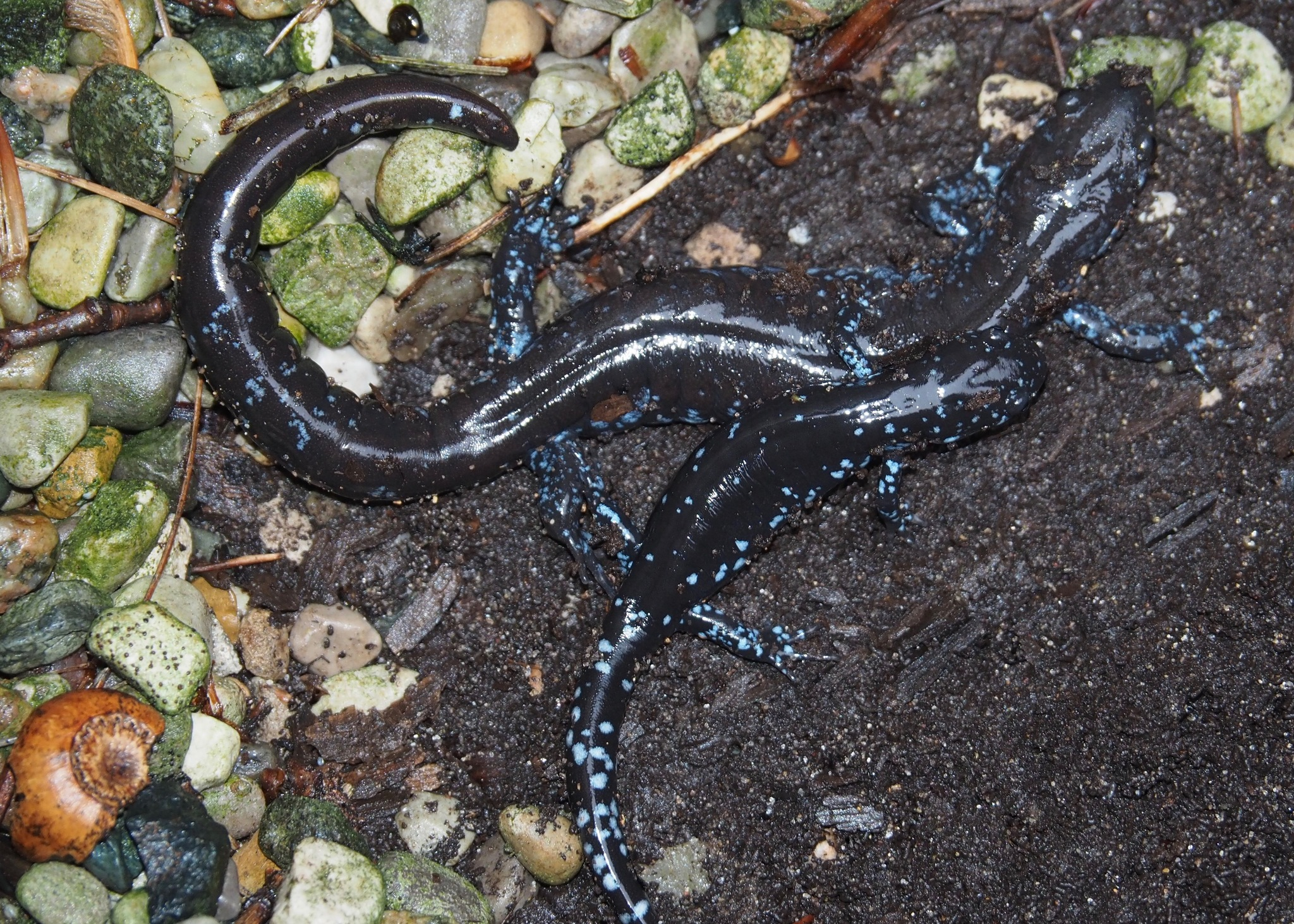
Size comparison between an adult unisexual salamander (top) and A. laterale (bottom) in Clare County, Michigan.

The physical morphology of unisexual salamanders is highly variable within and between populations, being dependent on their individual genotypes. Generally, they are robust, gray to blue-black in color, and have an average snout-vent length (SVL) of around 80 mm (3.1 in) with a laterally-compressed tail nearly as long as their body. They are larger than blue-spotted salamander (A. laterale) females, and close in size to Jefferson salamander (A. jeffersonianum) and small-mouthed salamander (A. texanum) females. Unisexuals with a high percentage of A. laterale DNA tend to be black with various amounts of blue flecking, and have a relatively narrow head and short limbs. Individuals with a higher degree of A. jeffersonianum DNA are larger, gray to brown in color with small amounts of blue flecking, and have a broader head and longer limbs. Individuals with a higher percentage of A. texanum DNA are gray, more slender, and have narrow heads.

== Distribution and habitat ==
The species complex is widely distributed throughout the Great Lakes region and northeastern North America. Quebec, central Ontario, and northern Minnesota represent the northern extent of their range. The most southerly populations are found in New Jersey and northern Kentucky. From east to west, they occur from Nova Scotia to Minnesota.

Like their respective sperm donor species, unisexual salamanders are found in moist deciduous or mixed forests that contain, or are adjacent to, suitable vernal pools for breeding. Adults find shelter under rocks and logs, or in mammal burrows, during the day and forage for prey on the forest floor at night. They typically overwinter in burrows or other suitable sites below the frost line.

Infertile, pearly-white embryos are common in unisexal eggs.

== Reproduction ==
Like other species of mole salamander, unisexuals gather at vernal pools free of predators to breed in the spring. Males of another mole salamander species deposit spermatophores, which a female collects using the cloaca. After 1-2 days, a unisexual lays 20-50 eggs that are attached to submerged branches or plants. The eggs hatch after 3-14 weeks. Eggs laid by unisexuals tend to have a much lower survival rate; one population of Small-mouthed Salamander dependents had an embryonic survival rate of 16%. After hatching, the larvae feed on invertebrates for 2-4 months until they undergo metamorphosis and leave the pond. Unisexuals may take more time to reach maturity than their bisexual counterparts.

== Genetics ==
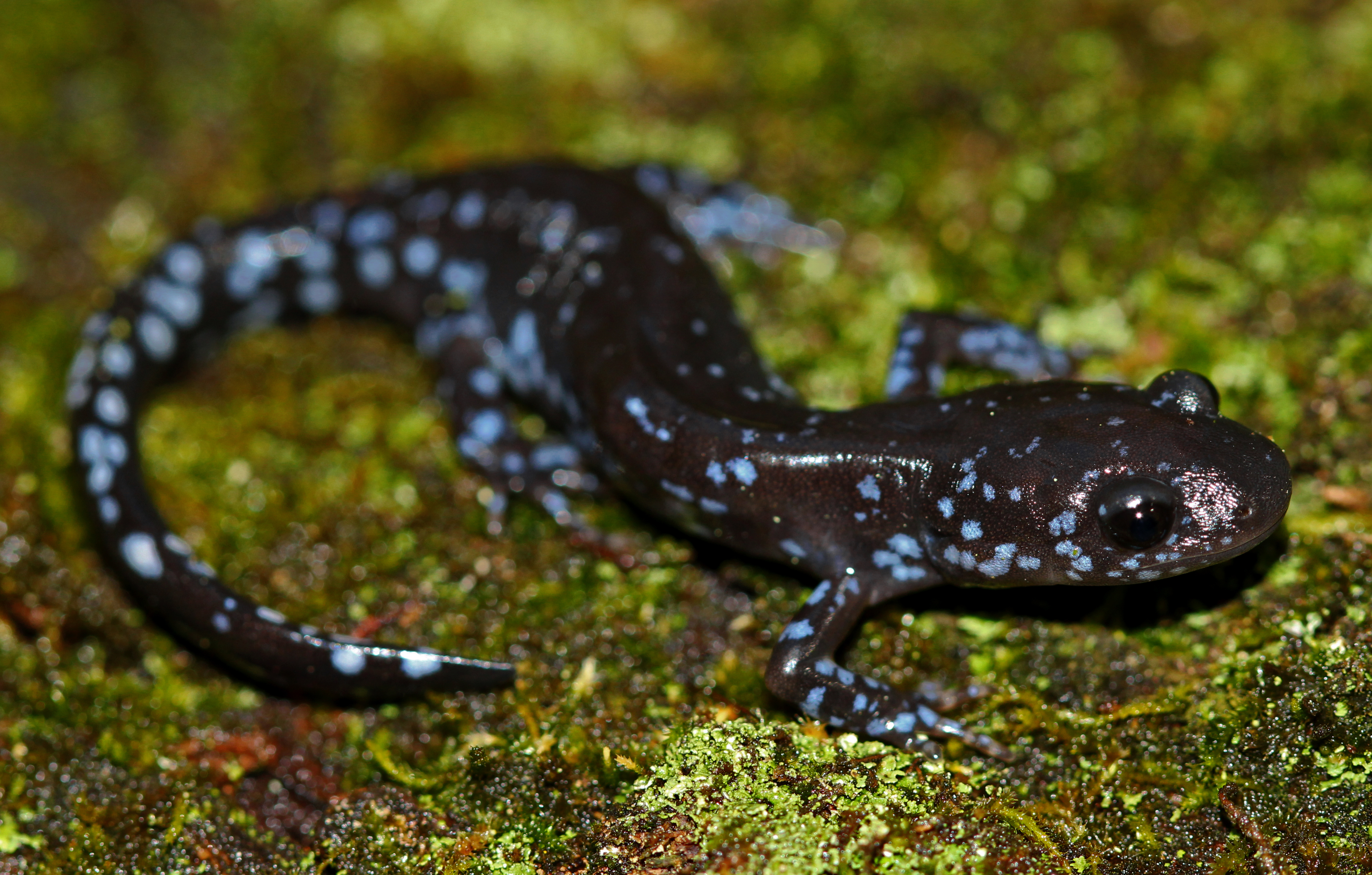
A. laterale (L)

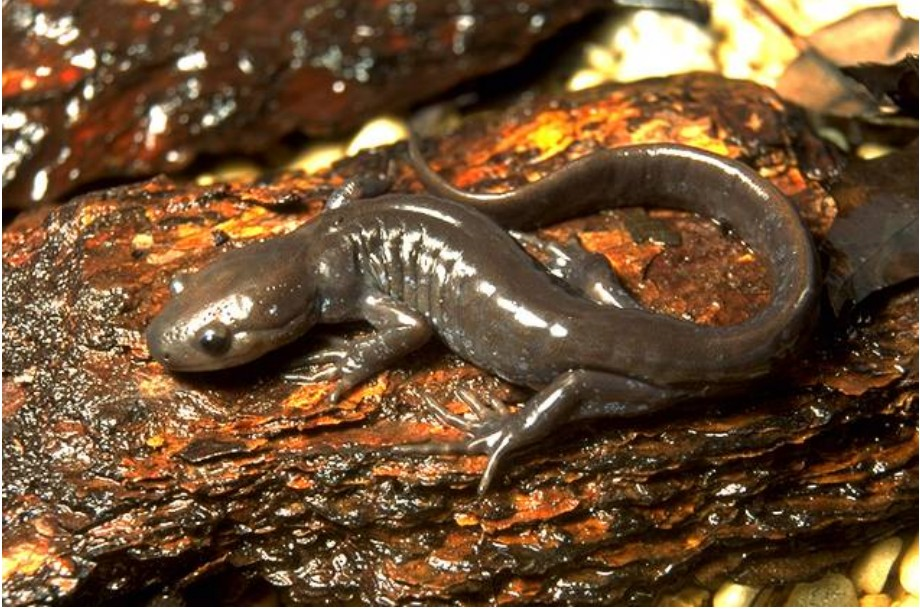
A. jeffersonianum (J)

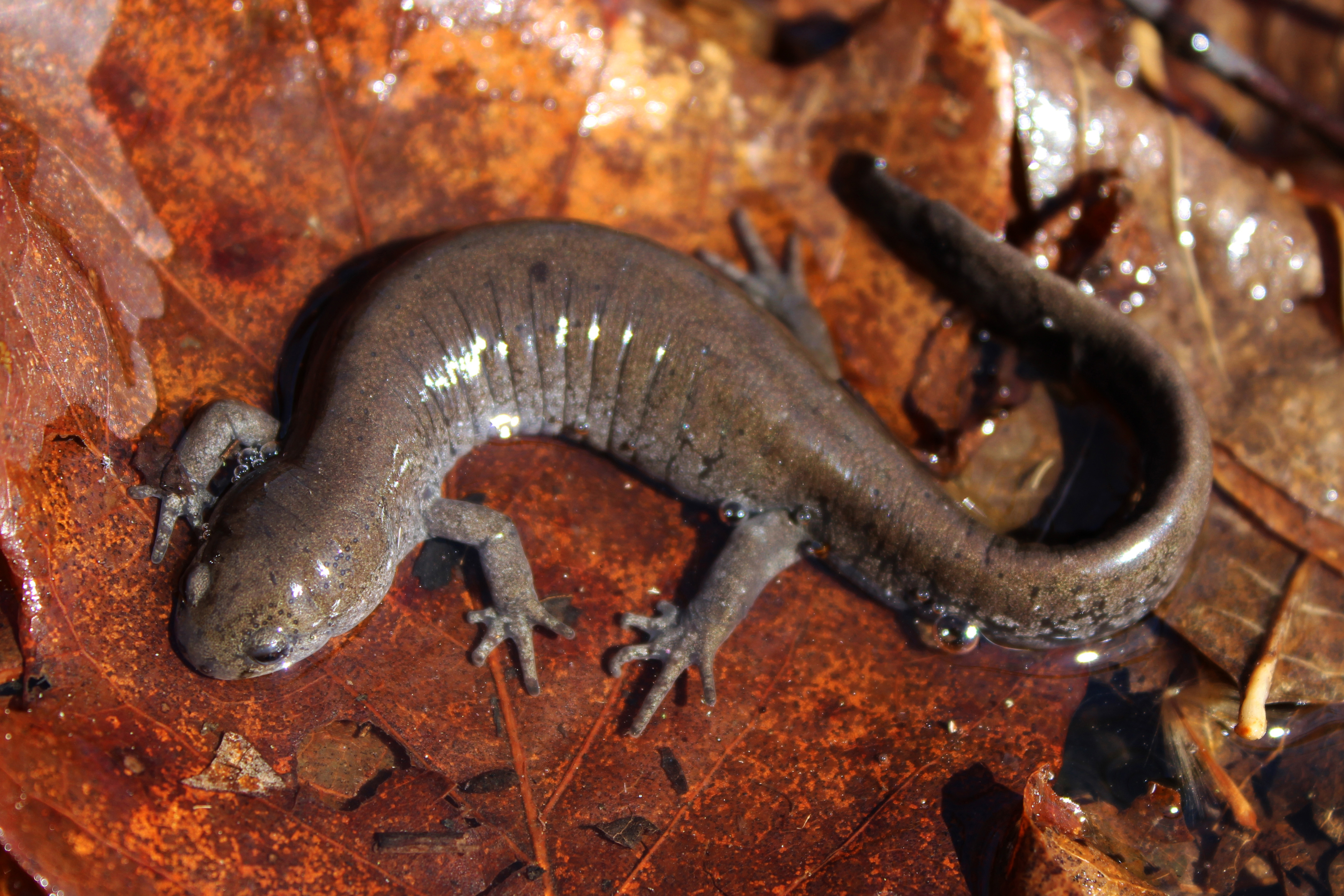
A. texanum (T)

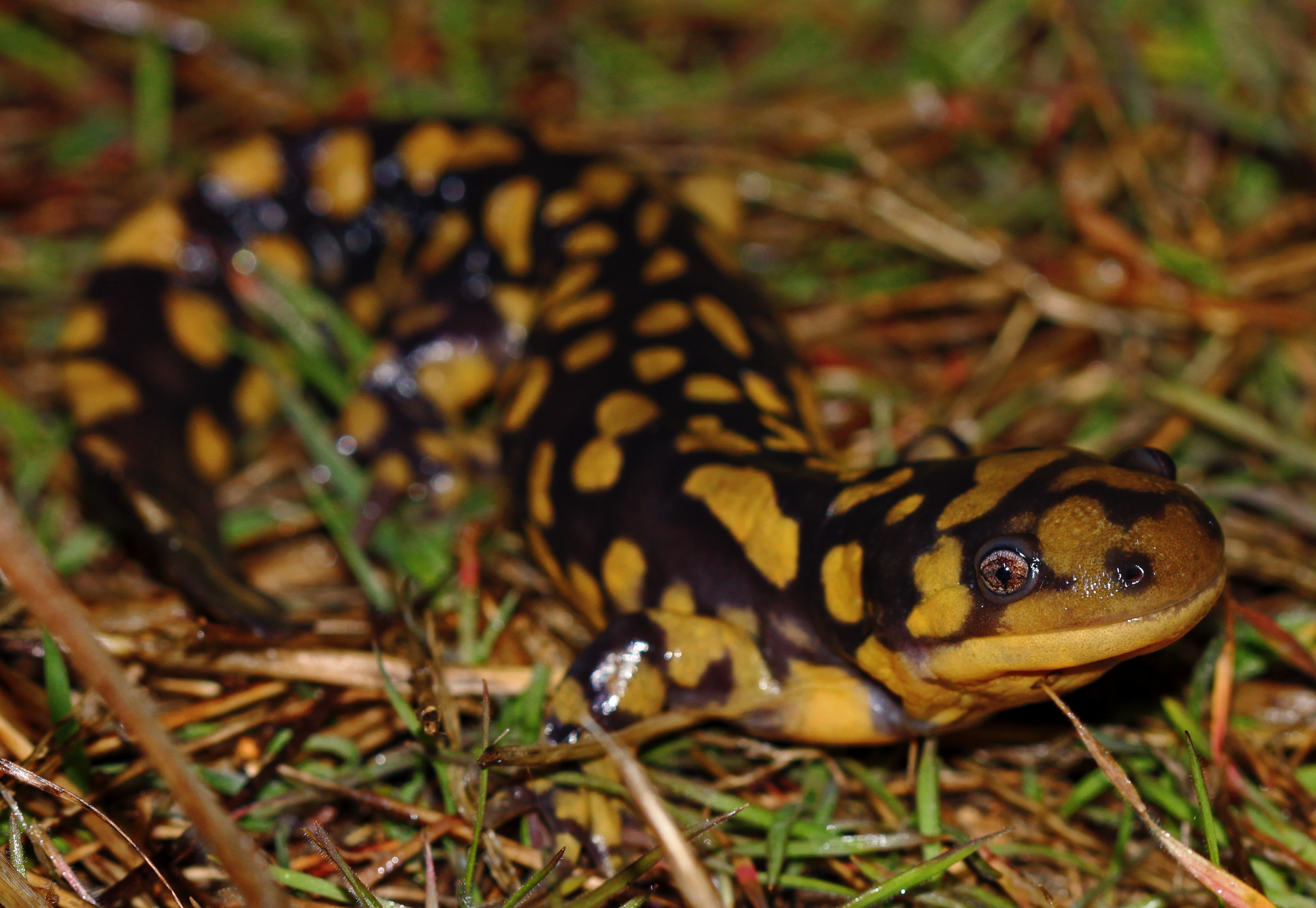
A. tigrinum (Ti)

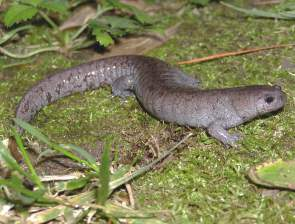
A. barbouri (B)

Five species of Ambystoma salamanders that contribute genetic material to the unisexual species complex.

In order to reproduce, unisexual females require sperm from sympatric, closely related species of salamanders. This process, in which a species requires input from another biological taxon in order to complete its reproductive cycle is called kleptogenesis. This may take place in one of three ways:

- Gynogenesis: The presence of sperm initiates cell division in the ova without incorporating any of the paternal genetic material, resulting in clonal offspring with the same ploidy level as the mother.
- Genome Addition: The haploid genome (haplome) of the sperm is incorporated into the ova without excising any of the mother's genetic material, resulting in polyploid offspring with higher ploidy levels than the mother. Ploidy elevation via genome addition appears to be a fairly common.
- Genome Replacement: The sperm haplome is incorporated and replaces one of the mother's haplomes, resulting in offspring with the same ploidy level as the mother. This method of reproduction appears to be the least common of the three.

Five related species of ambystomid salamanders are known to contribute genetic material to the complex: the blue-spotted salamander (A. laterale), Jefferson salamander (A. jeffersonianum), small-mouthed salamander (A. texanum), tiger salamander (A. tigrinum), and the streamside salamander (A. barbouri), denoted respectively as L, J, T, Ti, and B. The most widely distributed of these donor species are A. laterale and A. jeffersonium. As a result of genome addition during reproduction, the genome of a given unisexual individual may contain genetic material from up to 4 of these species. 24 genomic combinations have been identified, including 2 diploid, 7 triploid, 11 tetraploid, and 4 pentaploid genotypes.

Despite the complexity of their genetic makeup, phylogenetic analyses of their mitochondrial DNA indicate that the unisexual species complex constitutes a monophyletic group, sharing a most recent common ancestor with a lineage of A. barbouri from Kentucky. The initial hybridization event likely occurred 2.4-3.9 million years ago in the Pliocene, making it the oldest-known lineage of unisexual vertebrates.

== See also ==
- Silvery salamander
- Tremblay's salamander
