= List of amphibians of Michigan =

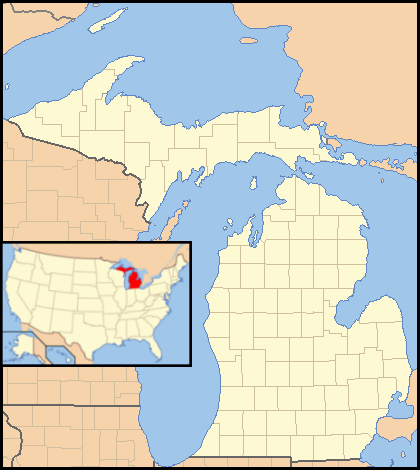
The state of Michigan, and its location in the United States

Twenty-six amphibian species are found in Michigan, one of the fifty United States. These species include twelve species of frog, twelve species of salamander and two species of toad, all members of the class Amphibia. Blanchard's cricket frog, a subspecies of northern cricket frog, is considered to be threatened and two species, the marbled salamander and small-mouth salamander, are considered endangered; these are protected under the Endangered Species Act of the State of Michigan. Two more species, the boreal chorus frog and lesser siren, are considered to be of special concern, although they are not protected under the act. There are no amphibians native to Michigan that are included in the federal Endangered Species Act.

Of the over 3400 species of frog and toad worldwide, the majority live in the tropics. However, Michigan's species live where it is often cold, necessitating adaptions to freezing weather due to their ectothermic (cold-blooded) nature. Most frogs and toads become dormant in the winter; some frogs can withstand short periods of freezing conditions, but this is not true of all species. Some species of salamander also hibernate during the winter, while other fully aquatic species remain active throughout the year. Amphibians are vulnerable to many types of human encroachment, including water pollution, automobiles, the destruction of wetlands through farming and the use of off-road vehicles and chemical pesticides. In Michigan, wetlands protection legislation is in place to prevent pollution and destruction, while additional wetlands are being reclaimed and restored after agricultural usage has ceased.

Amphibian habitats in Michigan are generally split into four regions: the northern and southern Lower Peninsula and the eastern and western Upper Peninsula, with differentiation based on climate, soils, underlying bedrock and glacially-derived landforms. Region One, the southern Lower Peninsula, is generally characterized by a warmer, less variable climate. Loam and clay soils dominate the region, with a lesser amount of sand, and deciduous hardwoods are the dominant tree species, with some natural prairies and savannas. There is a greater diversity of plant life in this region, and it includes plant and animal species that are not found in any of the other regions. Region Two, the northern Lower Peninsula, has a climate that is cooler and more variable, with greater precipitation, due to its proximity to the Great Lakes, more extensive uplands and more northern latitude. Sandy soils and glacial deposits are the dominant soil type, while forests of conifer or mixed conifer/hardwood predominate. Swamps and bogs are found more often in Region Two than Region One. Region Three, the eastern Upper Peninsula, has a climate profile similar to Region Two. Sand and clay dominate the soil of this region, and tend to be low in nutrients and poorly drained. There are extensive wetlands, dominated by coniferous forests, while upland areas provide mixed conifer/broadleaf hardwood tracts. Region Four, the western Upper Peninsula, provides extensive bedrock structures. The temperature is less moderate than in the other three regions, and can see frigid winters and hot summers. Mixed conifer/broadleaf forests again predominate.

== Frogs ==
Scientific name	Common name	Description	Image	Notes
Acris crepitans blanchardi	Blanchard's cricket frog	Adults are approximately 1 inch (2.5 cm) long and are colored brown or gray.		Considered a threatened species in Michigan.
Hyla chrysoscelis	Cope's gray tree frog	Adults are 1.5 to 2 inches (3.8 to 5.1 cm) long and colored gray, green or brown.		
Hyla versicolor	Gray tree frog	Adults are 1.5 to 2 inches (3.8 to 5.1 cm) long and colored gray, green or brown.		
Pseudacris crucifer crucifer	Northern spring peeper	Adults are 1 to 1.5 inches (2.5 to 3.8 cm) long and are colored light brown or tan.		
Pseudacris maculata	Boreal chorus frog	Adults are approximately 1.5 inches (3.8 cm) long and colored pale gray or brown, with a few individuals being red or bright green.		Occurs only on Isle Royale in Michigan, considered a species of special concern.
Pseudacris triseriata triseriata	Western chorus frog	Adults are 1 to 1.5 inches (2.5 to 3.8 cm) long and are colored brown with dark stripes.		
Rana catesbeiana	Bullfrog	Adults are 3 to 8 inches (7.6 to 20.3 cm) long and colored green, brown or olive.		
Rana clamitans melanota	Northern green frog	Adults are 2.5 to 4 inches (6.4 to 10.2 cm) long and colored green, brown or olive.		
Rana palustris	Pickerel frog	Adults are 2 to 3 inches (5.1 to 7.6 cm) long and colored green or brown with dark square spots.		
Rana pipiens	Northern leopard frog	Adults are 2 to 3.5 inches (5.1 to 8.9 cm) and colored green or brown with dark round spots.		
Rana septentrionalis	Mink frog	Adults are 2 to 3 inches (5.1 to 7.6 cm) long and colored a blotchy green or brown.		
Rana sylvatica	Wood frog	Adults are 2 to 2.5 inches (5.1 to 6.4 cm) long and colored brown or tan.		

== Salamanders ==
Scientific name	Common name	Description	Image	Notes
Ambystoma laterale	Blue-spotted salamander	Adults are 3.5 to 5.5 inches (8.9 to 14.0 cm) long and are colored black with turquoise or pale blue spots.		
Ambystoma maculatum	Spotted salamander	Adults are 4.3 to 9.8 inches (11 to 25 cm) long and are colored black or dark gray with round yellow spots.		
Ambystoma opacum	Marbled salamander	Adults are 3.5 to 5 inches (8.9 to 12.7 cm) long and are colored black or dark gray with white or gray markings.		Considered an endangered species in Michigan.
Ambystoma texanum	Small-mouth salamander	Adults are 4.3 to 7 inches (11 to 18 cm) long and are colored black, gray or brown.		Considered an endangered species in Michigan.
Ambystoma tigrinum tigrinum	Eastern tiger salamander	Adults are 7 to 13 inches (18 to 33 cm) long and are colored black, brown or olive with yellow or brown spots.		
Ambystoma tremblayi	Tremblay's salamander	A three-chromosomed hybrid between A. laterale and A. jeffersonianum; difficult to distinguish visually from the former.		Has been noted near Ann Arbor, Michigan.
Eurycea bislineata	Northern two-lined salamander	Adults reach 3.5 inches (8.9 cm) long and are generally yellow with two dark lines running the length of the body.		Only known to occur at Murphy Lake State Game Area in Tuscola County in eastern Michigan.
Hemidactylium scutatum	Four-toed salamander	Adults are 2 to 4 inches (5.1 to 10.2 cm) long and are colored orange to gray-brown, with small black or blue speckles.		
Necturus maculosus	Mudpuppy	Adults are 8 to 19 inches (20 to 48 cm) long and are colored black or gray-brown with dark splotches.		
Notophthalmus viridescens	Eastern newt	Adults are 2.5 to 5.5 inches (6.4 to 14.0 cm) long and are colored olive green to greenish brown.		
Plethodon cinereus	Red-backed salamander	Adults are 2.3 to 5 inches (5.8 to 12.7 cm) long and are generally darkly colored, with a red stripe on their back early in their life cycle.		
Siren intermedia nettingi	Western lesser siren	Adults are 7 to 19.7 inches (18 to 50 cm) long and are colored gray, brown or olive.		Considered a species of special concern in Michigan.

== Toads ==
Scientific name	Common name	Description	Image	Notes
Bufo americanus americanus	Eastern American toad	Adults are 2 to 4 inches (5.1 to 10.2 cm) long with warty brown skin.		
Bufo fowleri	Fowler's toad	Adults are 2 to 3.5 inches (5.1 to 8.9 cm) long with warty brown skin.		

== See also ==
- List of fauna of Michigan
