= List of amphibians of Ontario =

Amphibians in Ontario are classified into two orders: Caudata — which includes salamanders and newts — and Anura — which includes toads and frogs. The first order comprises thirteen species classified in four families, and the second order comprises thirteen species classified in three families.

== Caudata ==
Photo	Names (common / scientific)	IUCN Status	Notes	Distribution map
Family Proteidae
	Common mudpuppy Necturus maculosus	LC	Ontario's largest salamander, reaching 20–48 cm. Common in Great Lakes, Saint Lawrence River, and Ottawa River. Often caught by ice fishing enthusiasts. Fully aquatic with external gills retained throughout life.	
Family Salamandridae
	Eastern red-spotted newt Notophthalmus viridescens viridescens	LC	Common and widespread in eastern Ontario. Has a unique terrestrial juvenile stage called an 'eft' with bright orange coloration.	
	Central newt Notophthalmus viridescens louisianensis	LC	Subspecies of the Eastern red-spotted newt found in southwestern Ontario. Prefers ponds, ditches, and slow-moving streams.	
Family Ambystomatidae
	Spotted salamander Ambystoma maculatum	LC	Common and widespread throughout Ontario. Can live up to 32 years. Breeds in temporary woodland pools and vernal pools. Essential for forest ecosystem health.	
	Blue-spotted salamander Ambystoma laterale	LC	Common and widespread throughout Ontario. Often found under logs and rocks in moist forest areas. Important indicator species for forest health.	
	Jefferson salamander Ambystoma jeffersonianum	LC	Found in southern Ontario's deciduous forests. One of the first salamanders to breed in spring, often while snow is still on the ground.	
	Eastern tiger salamander Ambystoma tigrinum	LC	Second largest salamander in Ontario at 15–30 cm. Found in southern Ontario's woodlands and grasslands. Spends much of its time underground in burrows.	
	Small-mouthed salamander Ambystoma texanum	LC	Rare in Ontario, limited to extreme southwestern regions including Pelee Island. This species is vulnerable to habitat loss and climate change.	
Family Plethodontidae
	Northern dusky salamander Desmognathus fuscus	LC	Found in eastern Ontario near rocky streams and springs. Breathes through skin and mouth lining as it has no lungs.	
	Allegheny Mountain dusky salamander Desmognathus ochrophaeus	LC	This species is designated as endangered in Ontario. COSEWIC considers the population critically endangered. Very limited distribution in extreme eastern Ontario.	
	Northern two-lined salamander Eurycea bislineata	LC	Common in eastern Ontario near rocky streams and springs. Named for the two dark lines running down its back.	
	Four-toed salamander Hemidactylium scutatum	LC	This species is likely to be designated as threatened or vulnerable in Ontario. Found in sphagnum bogs and swamps. Can detach its tail when threatened.	
	Eastern red-backed salamander Plethodon cinereus	LC	Common in eastern Ontario's forest floors. Completely terrestrial - lays eggs on land with no aquatic larval stage. No lungs - breathes through skin.	

== Anura ==
Photo	Names (common / scientific)	IUCN Status	Notes	Distribution map
Family Bufonidae
	American toad Anaxyrus americanus	LC	Common and widespread throughout Ontario. Distinguished by its warty skin and parotoid glands behind the eyes. Musical trilling call can last 30 seconds.	
	Fowler's toad Anaxyrus fowleri	LC	Found in southwestern Ontario along the Great Lakes shores. Prefers sandy habitats. Call sounds like a crying baby or sheep bleating.	
Family Hylidae
	Gray treefrog Dryophytes versicolor	LC	Common in southern and central Ontario. Can change color from gray to green. Has sticky toe pads for climbing trees and shrubs.	
	Spring peeper Pseudacris crucifer	LC	Common and widespread throughout Ontario. One of the first frogs to call in spring. Named for the distinctive X-shaped mark on its back.	
	Western chorus frog Pseudacris triseriata	LC	Found in western and central Ontario in grasslands and open areas. Call sounds like running a fingernail along a comb. Breeds in temporary pools.	
	Boreal chorus frog Pseudacris maculata	LC	Found in northern Ontario's boreal wetlands and prairies. Recently recognized as distinct from Western chorus frog through genetic analysis.	
	Blanchard's cricket frog Acris blanchardi	LC	This species is designated as endangered in Ontario. Limited to extreme southwestern Ontario. Call sounds like clicking marbles together. Requires shallow waters with emergent vegetation.	
Family Ranidae
	Wood frog Lithobates sylvaticus	LC	Common and widespread throughout Ontario to the far north. The most northern amphibian in North America, extending beyond the Arctic Circle. Can freeze solid and survive winter temperatures.	
	Northern leopard frog Lithobates pipiens	LC	Common and widespread throughout Ontario. Distinguished by dark spots with light borders. Important indicator species for wetland health. Legal to hunt in Ontario.	
	Pickerel frog Lithobates palustris	LC	Found in eastern Ontario near cool, clear streams and springs. Has distinctive square spots on back. Skin secretions are toxic to other amphibians.	
	Green frog Lithobates clamitans	LC	Common and widespread throughout Ontario in permanent water bodies. Call sounds like a banjo string being plucked. Has prominent dorsolateral folds. Legal to hunt in Ontario.	
	Mink frog Lithobates septentrionalis	LC	Common in northern Ontario lakes and ponds. Named for its distinctive musky odor. Call sounds like rapid tapping on wood.	
	American bullfrog Lithobates catesbeianus	LC	Common in southern Ontario's large permanent water bodies. Largest frog in Ontario at 9–20 cm. Deep 'jug-o-rum' call can be heard over 1 kilometer away. Legal to hunt in Ontario.	

== See also ==
- List of birds of Ontario
- List of amphibians of Quebec
