= Silvery salamander =

Conservation status
- Least Concern (IUCN 3.1)

Scientific classification
- Kingdom: Animalia
- Phylum: Chordata
- Class: Amphibia
- Order: Urodela
- Family: Ambystomatidae
- Genus: Ambystoma
- Species: A. platineum

Binomial name
- Ambystoma platineum (Hallowell, 1856)

Species of amphibian

The silvery salamander (Ambystoma platineum) is a hybrid species of mole salamander from the United States of America and Canada. It is usually between 5.5–7.75 in (14.0–19.7 cm) long and slender, with many small silvery-blue spots on its back and sides. It is brownish grey, and the area around its vent is grey.

== Taxonomy ==
A unisexual Ambystoma hybrid species, A. platineum has been grouped with other unisexual ambystomatids that take genetic material from Jefferson salamanders (A. jeffersonianum), streamside salamanders (A. barbouri), small-mouthed salamanders (A. texanum), tiger salamanders (A. tigrinum) and the blue-spotted salamander (A. laterale).

Species name designations for unisexual Ambystoma are no longer in use. Instead, unisexual Ambystoma are now considered distinct biotypes rather than species.

== Behaviour ==
Silvery salamanders are gynogens; lacking its own males, they breed with males of a different species. The males' spermatophores only stimulate egg development; their genetic material does not contribute to the offspring's DNA. The females lay cylindrical egg masses and attach them to underwater twigs. Ambystoma platineum is rarely observed and its diet and lifestyle are unknown.

== Habitat and range ==
Silvery salamanders live almost anywhere between south-central Michigan to adjacent Indiana and Ohio, western Massachusetts and southern to northern New Jersey. They are commonly found in or near shallow rivers and ponds in deciduous forest. There is an extremely limited population of the salamanders in Vermilion County, Illinois, with only one remaining natural population known; they are considered endangered within the state. Theory states that the population may have dropped due to the vernal pool in which they live not retaining water for a long enough period for their tadpoles to reach metamorphosis.

== Predators ==
The LJJ biotype's predators include birds, fish, raccoons and dogs.

== Diet ==
Their diet mainly consists of slugs, ants, spiders, soft insects and worms.

== See also ==
- Tremblay's salamander
- Jefferson salamander
- Blue-spotted salamander

== Bibliography ==
- National Audubon Society Field Guide to Reptiles and Amphibians
- Pfingsten, R.A., J.G. Davis, T.O. Matson, G.J. Lipps Jr., D. Wynn, and B.J. Armitage (Editors). Amphibians of Ohio (2013). Ohio Biological Survey Bulletin New Series, Volume 17, Number 1. xiv + 899 pages
