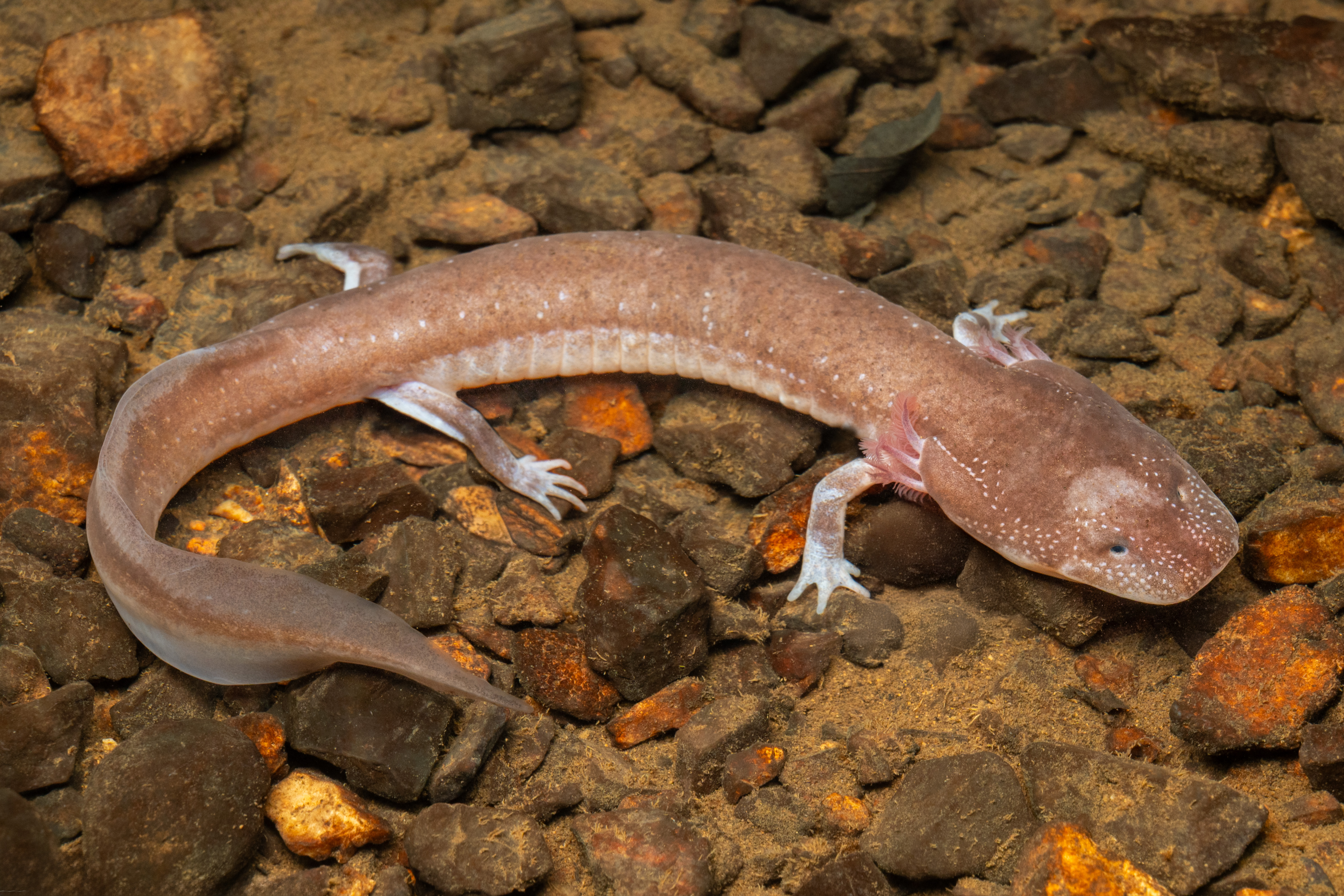

Conservation status
- Endangered (IUCN 3.1)

- Critically Imperiled (NatureServe)

Scientific classification
- Kingdom: Animalia
- Phylum: Chordata
- Class: Amphibia
- Order: Urodela
- Family: Plethodontidae
- Genus: Gyrinophilus
- Species: G. gulolineatus

Binomial name
- Gyrinophilus gulolineatus Brandon, 1965

Synonyms
- Gyrinophilus palleucus gulolineatus Brandon, 1965

= Berry Cave salamander =

Species of amphibian

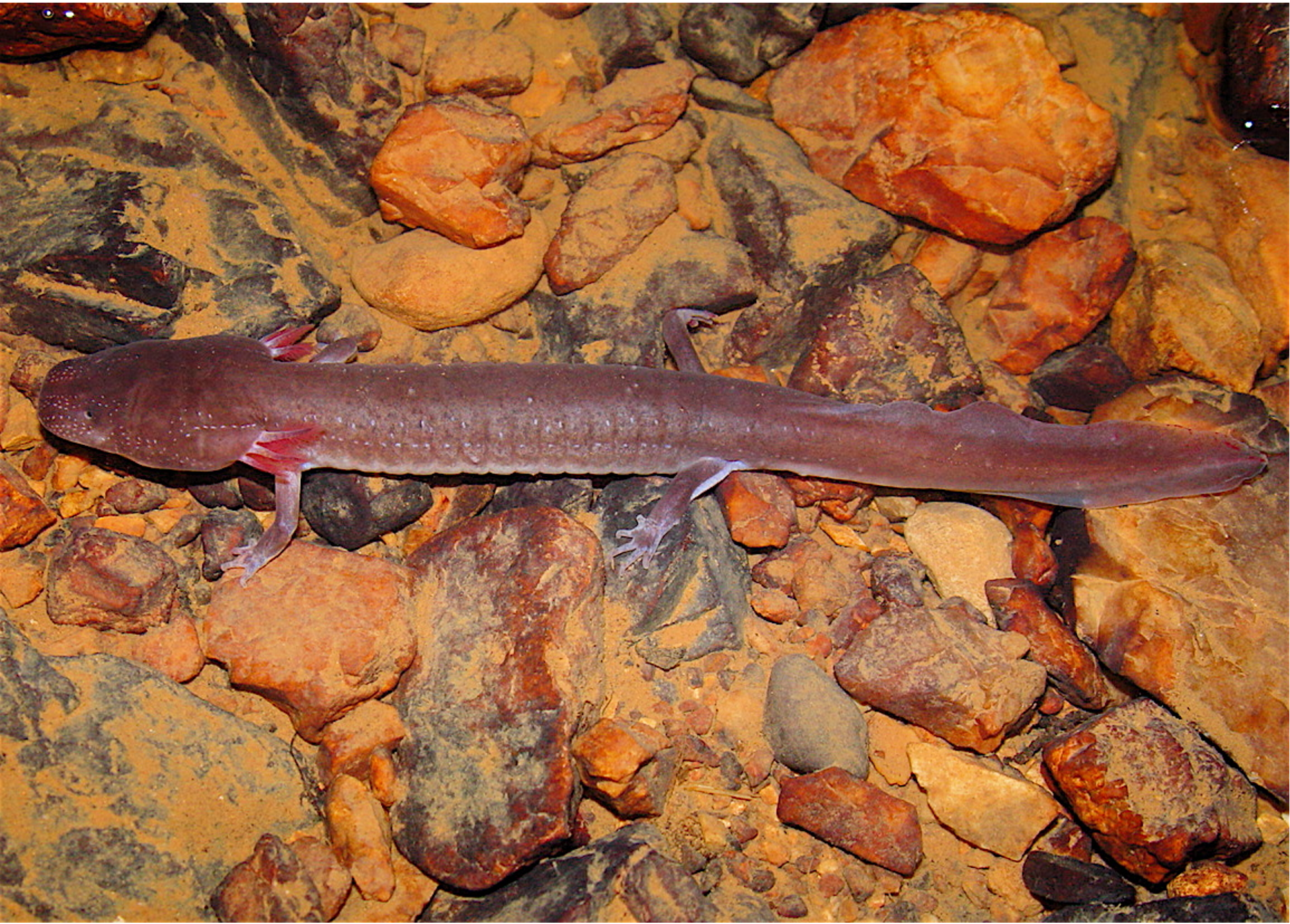
Berry Cave Salamander Gyrinophilus gulolineatus

The Berry Cave salamander (Gyrinophilus gulolineatus) is a species of salamander in the family Plethodontidae, endemic to the Ridge-and-Valley Appalachians of eastern Tennessee in the United States. Its natural habitat is inland karsts where it lives underground. It is threatened by habitat loss.

== Description ==
This salamander resembles the Tennessee cave salamander (Gyrinophilus palleucus) but grows to a larger size, has a more spatulate snout, a broader head and more pigmentation. The premaxilla bones at the tip of the snout are completely divided in adults of this species while they are not in the Tennessee cave salamander. The larvae have small, functional eyes and they can detect vibrations in the water with the help of mechanoreceptors which are located on the head and sides. If they proceed to the full adult state, their eyes become functionless.

== Distribution ==
This salamander is known from caves in the Ridge-and-Valley Appalachians of eastern Tennessee; its range is smaller than that of the spring salamander (Gyrinophilus porphyriticus) and is completely inside it, and the two species sometimes inhabit the same cave systems.

== Biology ==
Phylogenetic analysis using nuclear and mitochondrial DNA seems to indicate that the Berry Cave salamander and the Tennessee cave salamander have diverged from the spring salamander only recently. The Berry Cave salamander is usually a paedomorphic species which does not undergo metamorphosis to an adult stage, instead remaining and breeding in the larval state, retaining its juvenile traits for the rest of its life.

== Status ==
G. gulolineatus inhabits a limited number of caverns in the mountains of East Tennessee, and the total area it occupies is less than 5,000 km^{2} (1,900 mi^{2}). In the Berry Cave for which it was named, the population seems to be declining, and its population overall is unknown. The International Union for Conservation of Nature has rated its conservation status as endangered and advocates protection of the watersheds that drain into the underground systems in which it lives. A 2021 biological survey of G. gulolineatus documented reduced sightings of this species isolated to the cave habitats of the Appalachian Valley of eastern Tennessee and recommended a rank of Endangered under IUCN Red List criteria.

== Conservation ==
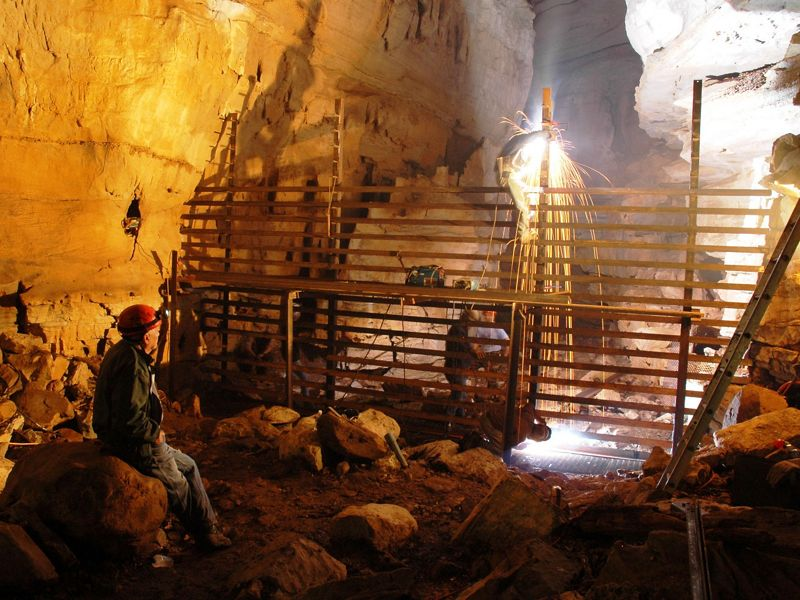
Example of Cave Gate employed by the Nature Conservancy in Tennessee

Given that the number of extant localities for G. gulolineatus is ≤10, it is imperative that the sites be protected from the public. Several localities are owned by city-, state-, and federal-government entities, protecting them from development. The type locality is located on private land, but it is protected by a conservation easement through the nature conservancy. This easement makes access possible only for individuals granted research permits. Further, a combination of physical measures (steel gates, fences) and video-surveillance protect all of these sensitive sites from human visitation. Gyrinophilus gulolineatus is listed as endangered by the state of Tennessee, which legally protects it from harassment and capture by individuals not possessing permits. The protection of these caves also protects the sensitive bats, fish, and other troglodytic fauna that reside in these sites.
