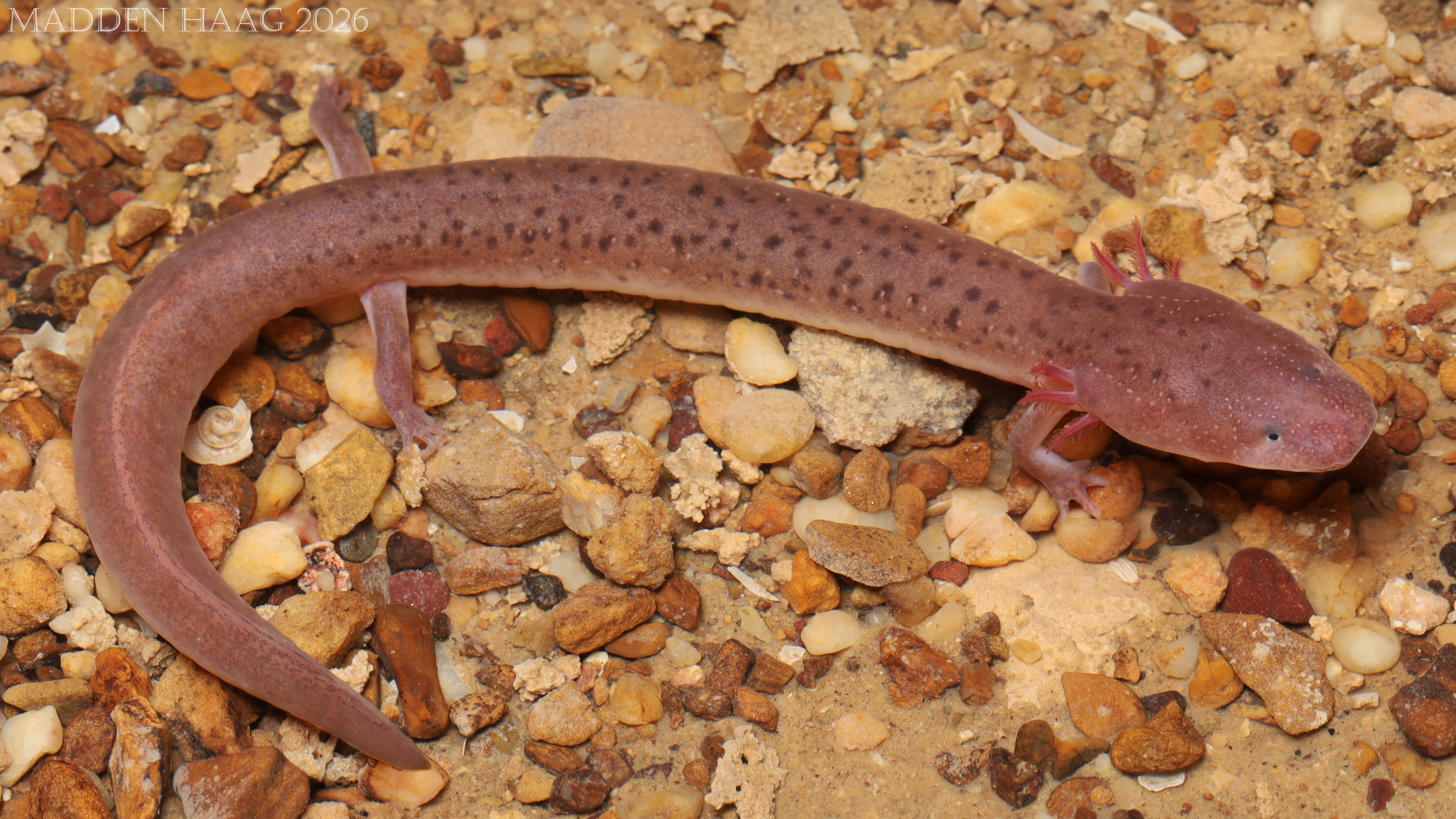

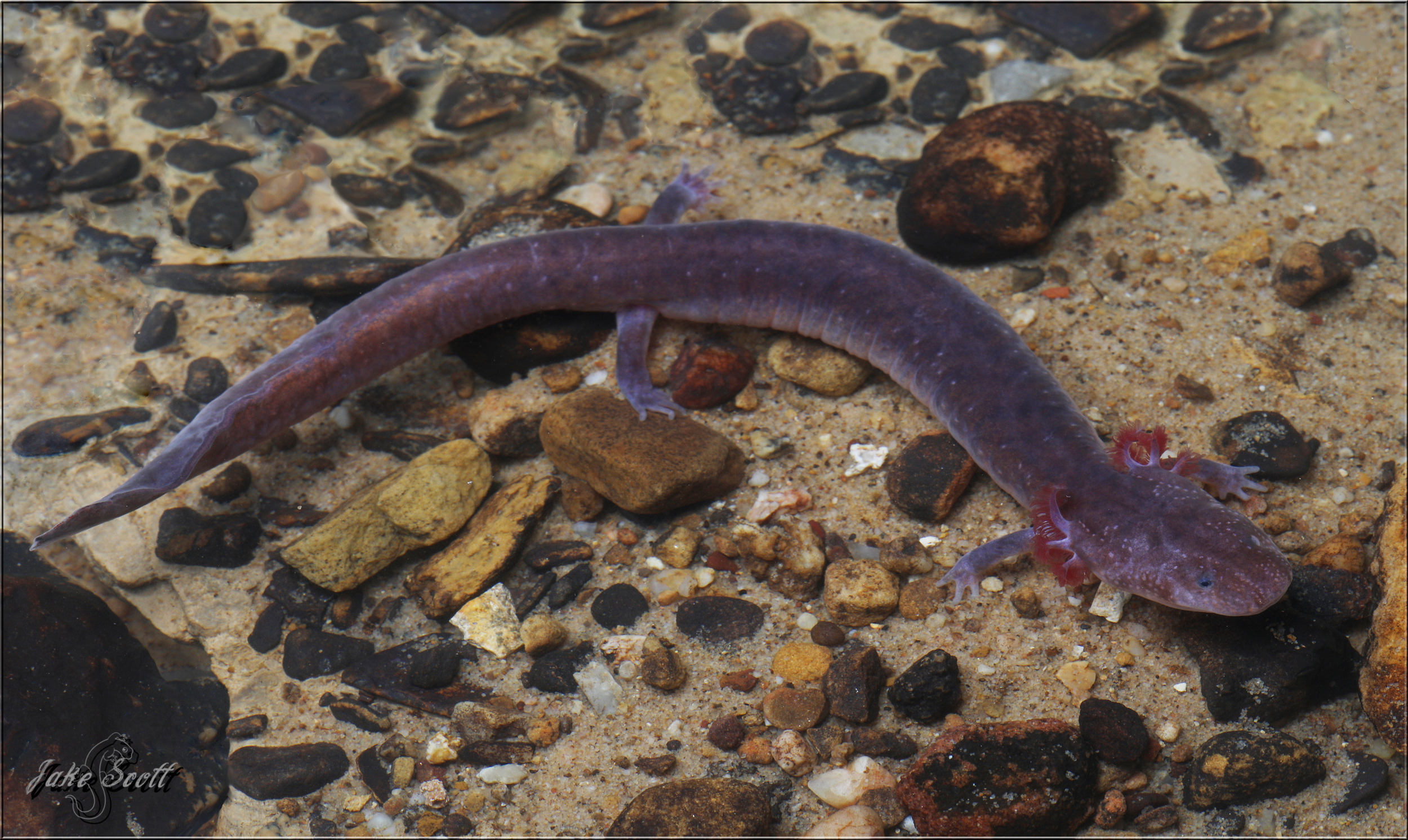
- Spotted and unspotted color morphs of the Big Mouth Cave Salamander (Gyrinophilus palleucus necturoides)

Conservation status
- Critically Imperiled (NatureServe)

Scientific classification
- Kingdom: Animalia
- Phylum: Chordata
- Class: Amphibia
- Order: Urodela
- Family: Plethodontidae
- Genus: Gyrinophilus
- Species: G. palleucus
- Subspecies: G. p. necturoides

Trinomial name
- Gyrinophilus palleucus necturoides Lazell and Brandon, 1962

= Gyrinophilus palleucus necturoides =

Big Mouth Cave salamander

Subspecies of amphibian

Gyrinophilus palleucus necturoides, the Big Mouth Cave salamander, a lungless salamander, is a subspecies of the Tennessee cave salamander (Gyrinophilus palleucus). The Big Mouth Cave salamander lives in Big Mouth Cave and other caves in the Elk River drainage basin in Grundy County and Coffee County, Tennessee. The salamander was first described by Lazell and Brandon in 1962.

== Conservation status ==
While the TNC rates the Big Mouth Cave salamander as "critically imperiled", IUCN claims it is only "vulnerable". A study in 2007 by Brian T. Miller and Matthew L. Niemiller investigated the actual population size of the subspecies. They determined that the subspecies was actually abundant in Big Mouth Cave and other caves, contrary to popular concern.
