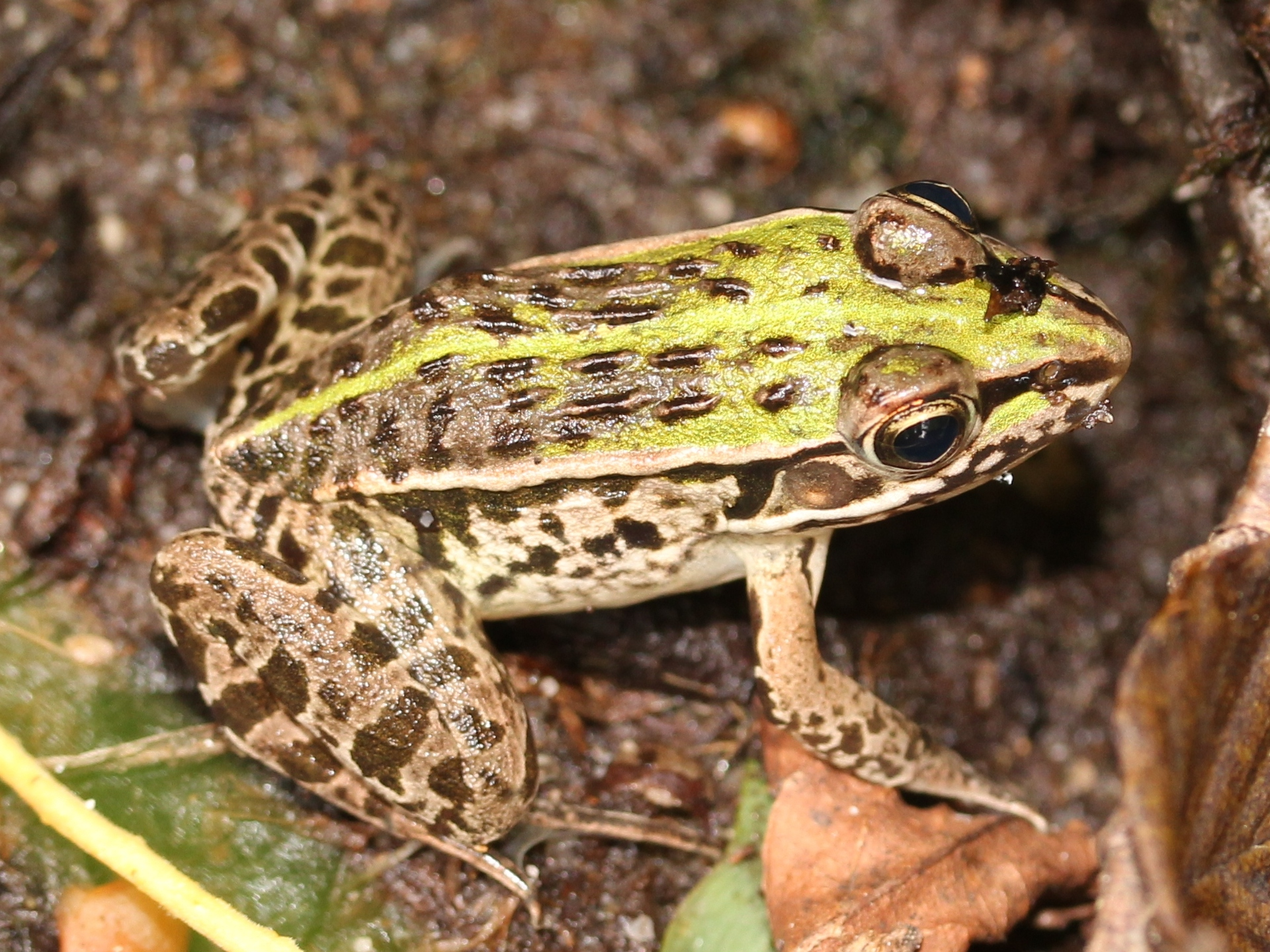

Conservation status
- Least Concern (IUCN 3.1)

Scientific classification
- Kingdom: Animalia
- Phylum: Chordata
- Class: Amphibia
- Order: Anura
- Family: Ranidae
- Genus: Pelophylax
- Species: P. nigromaculatus

Binomial name
- Pelophylax nigromaculatus (Hallowell, 1861)

Synonyms
- Rana nigromaculata Hallowell, 1861 "1860"; Rana marmorata Hallowell, 1861 "1860"; Hoplobatrachus reinhardtii Peters, 1867; Hoplobatrachus davidi David, 1873 "1872"; Hylarana nigromaculata (Hallowell, 1861)

= Pelophylax nigromaculatus =

Species of amphibian

Pelophylax nigromaculatus (formerly Rana nigromaculata), is a species of true frog found in East Asia, first described in 1861. This widespread and common frog has many common names, including dark-spotted frog, black-spotted pond frog, and black-spotted frog. This frog is an opportunistic predator that predominantly eats insects, including wasps and hornets.

== Occurrence ==
It occurs across much of mainland eastern-northeastern China, the Amur River valley in Russia, the Korean Peninsula (including Ulleungdo Island), and most of Japan, with exceptions of Hokkaidō and the Ryukyu Islands. It has been considered the most-common of the true frogs on the Korean Peninsula, and has been hunted for food there for centuries, and, in modern times, used as an experimental animal. There are also introduced populations in Turkmenistan, Oahu, and Saipan.

== Habitat ==
The dark-spotted frog is a relatively low-altitude species, not being found above 2200 m. It ranges across a variety of habitats, from deserts and bushland to meadows and forests, and is typically found in or near stagnant or slow-moving water. Although relatively tolerant of human interference, it is increasingly threatened by hunting and water pollution.

== Description ==
Adult males measure about 62 mm (2.4 in) and females 74 mm (2.9 in) in snout–vent length. The dorsal colouration varies from grey to greyish-olive, olive, and green. There are usually large dark spots, a light mid-dorsal line, and two lines on dorso-lateral folds. The belly is white. The toes are webbed. Males have a paired vocal sac and nuptial pads on the first finger.

Mating season occurs soon after hibernation. Maturation probably occurs at an age of two years, and the total life span may reach 13 years. The clutch size has been reported as 1800–3000 or 600–5000 eggs. The eggs are laid in shallow water.

The species is impervious to the venom of the Asian giant hornet, which it consumes as prey. The opalinid Protoopalina pingi is known to parasitize the frog.
