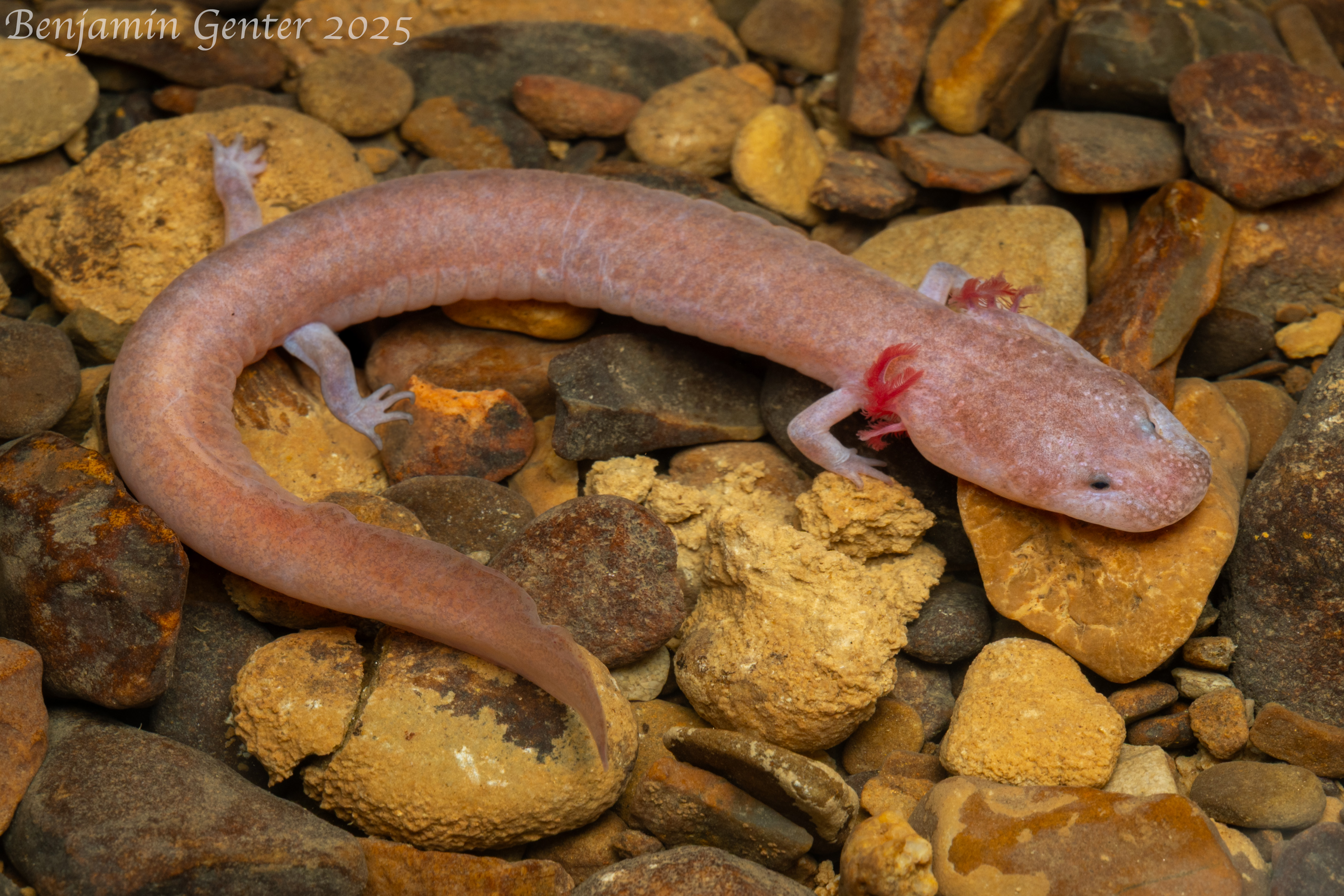
- The "Pale" subspecies, G. p. palleucus
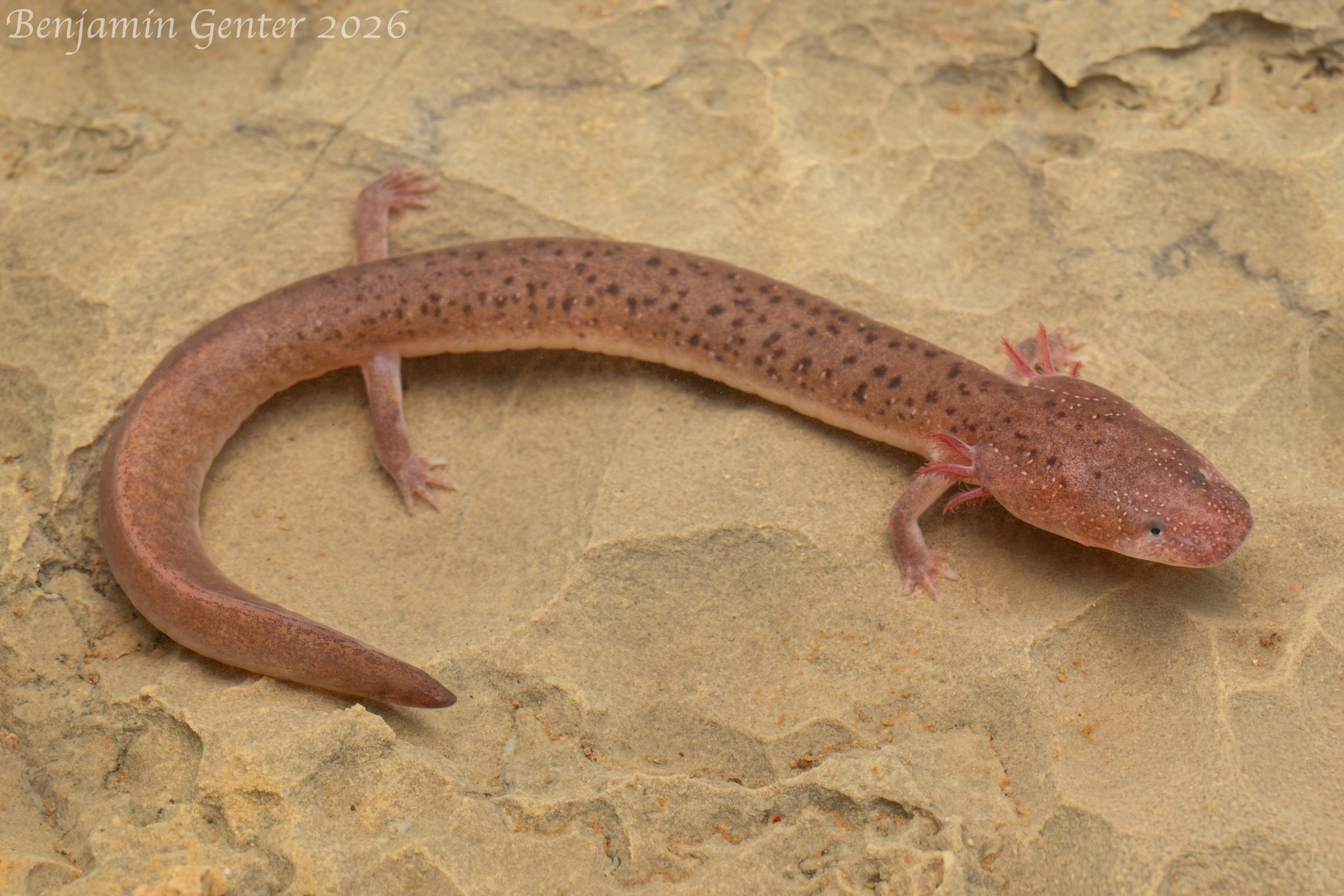
- The "Big Mouth Cave" subspecies, G. p. necturoides

Conservation status
- Near Threatened (IUCN 3.1)

- Imperiled (NatureServe)

Scientific classification
- Kingdom: Animalia
- Phylum: Chordata
- Class: Amphibia
- Order: Urodela
- Family: Plethodontidae
- Genus: Gyrinophilus
- Species: G. palleucus

Binomial name
- Gyrinophilus palleucus McCrady, 1954

Subspecies
- G. p. necturoides (big mouth cave salamander); G. p. palleucus (pale salamander)

= Tennessee cave salamander =

Species of amphibian

The Tennessee cave salamander (Gyrinophilus palleucus) is a species of salamander in the family Plethodontidae, endemic to the Appalachian Mountains in the United States. Its natural habitats are streams in caves. It is threatened by habitat loss.

== Distribution ==
The Tennessee cave salamander inhabits the southern Cumberland Plateau in the Appalachian Mountains in the United States. Its range includes south-central Tennessee, western North Carolina, northeastern Alabama, northwestern Alabama and northwestern Georgia. The salamander lives in cave systems, and is probably present in some systems as yet unexplored.

== Ecology ==
The salamander's diet consists of amphipods and other small aquatic invertebrates that live in caves. It occurs on sand, gravel, mud or rock, in streams, in rimstone pools and in isolated pools. It prefers clear water without sediment. It is occasionally seen outside caves but it is thought that this occurs when it has been accidentally washed out by floodwater.

This species is usually paedomorphic. This means it remains in the larval state for all of its life. Paedomorphic individuals breed as larvae, but some individuals continue to develop and undergo metamorphosis in the usual way.

== Status ==
G. palleucus lives in caves and is dependent on the quality of the water in the streams that flow through them. Threats it faces include pollution, siltation, flooding, increased water flow and the filling of sinkholes and dumping of trash. This salamander is known from about two dozen sites but probably occurs in other cave systems. Its total area of occupancy is less than 2,000 km^{2} (800 mi^{2}) and its population in Custard Hollow Cave in Tennessee seems to be decreasing. For these reasons, the International Union for Conservation of Nature has rated its conservation status as "near threatened" and advocates protection of the watersheds that drain into the caverns in which it lives.
