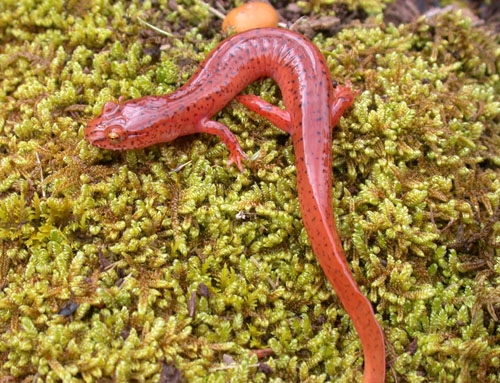
- Gyrinophilus porphyriticus

Scientific classification
- Kingdom: Animalia
- Phylum: Chordata
- Class: Amphibia
- Order: Urodela
- Family: Plethodontidae
- Subfamily: Hemidactyliinae
- Genus: Gyrinophilus; Cope, 1869

Diversity
- 4 species (see text)

= Gyrinophilus =

Spring salamanders

Genus of salamanders

Gyrinophilus, the spring salamanders, are a genus of salamanders in the family Plethodontidae. The genus is endemic to the Appalachian Mountains of the eastern United States and Canada. Their habitat is under rocks in cold, clear springs, in wet caves, and in streams in forested areas.

== Species ==
This genus consists of four species:

Binomial name and author	Common name
Gyrinophilus gulolineatus Brandon, 1965	Berry Cave salamander
Gyrinophilus palleucus McCrady, 1954	Tennessee cave salamander
Gyrinophilus porphyriticus (Green, 1827)	Spring salamander
Gyrinophilus subterraneus Besharse & Holsinger, 1977	West Virginia spring salamander
