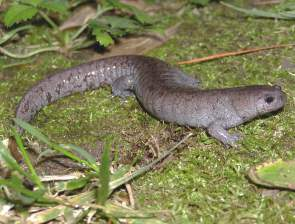

Conservation status
- Near Threatened (IUCN 3.1)

Scientific classification
- Kingdom: Animalia
- Phylum: Chordata
- Class: Amphibia
- Order: Urodela
- Family: Ambystomatidae
- Genus: Ambystoma
- Species: A. barbouri

Binomial name
- Ambystoma barbouri Kraus & Petranka, 1989

= Streamside salamander =

Species of amphibian

The streamside salamander (Ambystoma barbouri) is a species of mole salamander from North America, occurring in several Midwestern states of the US.

== Description ==
The streamside salamander is a medium-sized amystomatid salamander. It typically has a relatively small head and a short rounded snout. The salamander's body is relatively short and flaccid. There are 14-15 distinct costal grooves when fully grown. The tail is fairly short and thick, and it contains costal grooves that correspond directly to the vertebrae. Coloring is typically a dark black background covered in lichen-like markings in gray and brown. The species has more teeth, with a unique cusp shape, in its maxillary and premaxillary positions than its close relatives teeth, and is somewhat stockier.

== Distribution and habitat ==
The species is found in central Kentucky, southwestern Ohio, southeastern Indiana. There is an isolated population in Livingston County, Kentucky. Overall distribution is uncertain due to the species' cryptic habits and possible confusion or hybridization with the small-mouth salamander. Adults can be found underground and under rocks or leaves in deciduous forests at moderate elevations.

The streamside salamander is closely related to the pond-breeding small-mouth salamander, from which it is believed to have diverged during the late Pleistocene era as a result of climatic warming. Disappearance of pond habitats are thought to have forced the species to adapt to the new stream habitat.

== Ecology ==
=== Predator avoidance ===
The female places eggs on the underside of submerged rocks in stream pools to reduce risk of predation on eggs by fish. The salamander also uses olfactory cues to detect the presence of fish and tends to avoid placing eggs in pools that have high fish densities. Adults are not normally at risk of fish predation, but both eggs and young larvae may be targeted. It has been shown that the hatching time of streamside salamander eggs was responsive to the presence of green sunfish in the habitat, leading to the emergence of larvae that are larger and less easily preyed on, or possibly less susceptible to involuntary drift into areas with high fish densities.

Larvae show a range of coloration types that are believed to be driven by several different mechanisms. In fish-rich habitats, larvae tend to have light pigmentation that assists in blending in with the stream substrate and reduces the likelihood of being detected by predators. In the absence of predators, darker pigmentation that may assist in maintaining a higher body temperature and thus greater activity and foraging levels is more common. Risk of UV light damage may also drive a preference for darker coloration. Larvae may be able to play off these differing pigmentation drivers against each other by preferentially seeking out darker sediment that allows high camouflage while maintaining dark pigmentation.

== Evolutionary genetics ==
=== Gene flow ===
The streamside salamander has been a subject of interest in understanding the interaction between gene flow and natural selection. Salamander larvae that live in the presence of green sunfish are more likely to survive if they have stronger antipredator behavior, including reduced activity; however, larvae that are born in fish-free, ephemeral pools have higher survival with increased activity and higher feeding rates, traits which allow them to metamorphose before their aquatic habitat dries. Salamanders from highly isolated populations occupying habitat harboring fish have stronger antipredator behavior than salamanders from populations that are less isolated and more likely to experience gene flow from populations occupying fish-free habitats; this suggests that gene flow may hinder local adaptation of salamander populations to fish presence.

=== Local adaptation ===
Populations of the streamside salamander show evidence of adaptation to local environmental conditions, including the presence or absence of fish, as well as abiotic environmental factors. A landscape genomics study identified a small subset of genome-wide single-nucleotide polymorphisms (SNPs) at which allele frequencies show significant correlations with mean annual temperature, temperature seasonality, and annual precipitation; genes near the aforementioned SNPs function in hypoxia response and development, suggesting that geographic variation in oxygen availability (which correlates with water temperature and elevation) may impose divergent selection among salamander populations.

== Conservation ==
Total streamside salamander population is estimated at above 10,000 individuals, but precise data are lacking. The species is under pressure from habitat destruction (conversion of forests to pasture and residential areas) and water pollution. Triphenyltin, a common pesticide used in pecan, potatoes, beets, celery, coffee, and rice agriculture was found to cause streamside salamander larva mortality of 90% if present at concentrations above 5 μg/L. However, even lower levels led to reduced feeding and growth rates.
