= Gynogenesis =

Type of asexual reproduction

Gynogenesis, a form of parthenogenesis, is a system of asexual reproduction that requires the presence of sperm without the actual contribution of its DNA for completion. The paternal DNA dissolves or is destroyed before it can fuse with the egg. The egg cell of the organism is able to develop, unfertilized, into an adult using only maternal genetic material. Gynogenesis is often termed "sperm parasitism" because gynogenetic species are dependent on the labor of extraspecific males whose efforts are not rewarded with increased fitness. Gynogenetic species, "gynogens" for short, are unisexual, meaning they must mate with males from a closely related bisexual species that normally reproduces sexually.

Gynogenesis is a disadvantageous mating system for males, as they are unable to pass on their DNA. The question as to why this reproductive mode exists, given that it appears to combine the disadvantages of both asexual and sexual reproduction, remains unsolved in the field of evolutionary biology. The male equivalent of this process is androgenesis where the father is the sole contributor of DNA.

== Taxonomic range ==
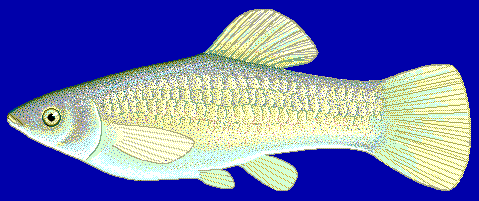
Poecilia formosa, the Amazon molly, requires sperm from a related species for gynogenesis.

Most gynogenetic species are fishes or amphibians. Among the fishes, Amazon mollies (Poecilia formosa) require the sperm of closely related male Poecilia latipinna to engage in gynogenesis. P. latipinna males prefer to mate with females of their own species. This presents a problem for P. formosa, as they must compete for males who do not favour them. However, those P. formosa successful in finding a mate make up the deficit by producing twice as many female offspring as their competitors. Among salamanders, the Ambystoma platineum, a unisexual mole salamander, is hybrid of sexually reproducing A. jeffersonianum and A. laterale. A. platineum individuals normally live in proximity to either of these parent species, so as to access their sperm.

== Gynogenesis with haplodiploidy ==
Gynogenesis with haplodiploidy in the ant Myrmecia impaternata. Ploidy is shown diagrammatically as 2N=6 for clarity.

The ant Myrmecia impaternata is a hybrid of M. banksi and M. pilosula. In ants, sex is determined by the haplodiploidy system: unfertilized eggs result in haploid males, while fertilized eggs result in diploid females. In this species – its specific epithet impaternata meaning 'fatherless' – the queen reproduces through sexual interaction, yet not fertilization, with gynogenetically produced females, and males reared from fatherless eggs. Since these males are haploid, they are genetically identical to one of the two parent species, but are produced by a queen of M. impaternata. The queens therefore have no need to mate parasitically with males of either parent species. This situation is unique.

== Evolutionary origin ==
Two evolutionary pathways may be considered to explain how and why gynogenesis evolved. The single-step pathway involves multiple changes taking place simultaneously: meiosis must be interrupted, one gender's gametes eradicated, and a unisexual gender formation must arise. The second option involves multiple steps: a sexual generation is formed with a strongly biased sex ratio, and because of Haldane's rule the species evolves towards loss of sexuality, with selection preferential to the gynogen. Experimenters who attempted unsuccessfully to induce P. formosa by hybridizing its genetic ancestors concluded that the evolutionary origin of P. formosa was not from the simple hybridization of two specific genomes, but the movement of certain alleles.

== See also ==
- Androgenesis
- Gonochorism
- Heterosexuality
- Hybridogenesis in water frogs
- Klepton
