= Tremblay's salamander =

Scientific classification
- Kingdom: Animalia
- Phylum: Chordata
- Class: Amphibia
- Order: Urodela
- Family: Ambystomatidae
- Genus: Ambystoma
- Species: A. tremblayi

Binomial name
- Ambystoma tremblayi Comeau, 1943

Species of amphibian

Tremblay's salamander (Ambystoma tremblayi) is a member of the family Ambystomidae from the United States of America and Canada. Reaching between 9.3 and 16 cm (3.7 and 6.3 in), the salamander is long and slender with many bluish-white markings. It is dark gray to gray-black and the area around the vent is black. Tremblay's salamander is a hybrid species of Jefferson salamanders (A. jeffersonianum) and blue-spotted salamanders (A. laterale). This hybridization created two all-female species: Tremblay's and silvery salamanders. These genetic curiosities possess three sets of chromosomes instead of the normal two.

== Behaviour ==
Tremblay's salamanders breed with male blue-spotted salamanders from March to April. Eggs are laid singly or in small masses of 6 to 10 eggs on debris at pond bottom. The males' chromosome contribution only stimulates the egg's development; its genetic material is ignored. It is not often observed and its diet and lifestyle are unknown.

== Habitat and range ==
These salamanders live on the bottom of deciduous forests from northern Wisconsin, northern Indiana, northern Ohio, and southern Michigan east through southern Quebec to the New England coastal plain.

== See also ==
- Silvery salamander
- Jefferson salamander
- Blue-spotted salamander
