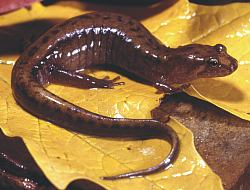

Conservation status
- Least Concern (IUCN 3.1)

Scientific classification
- Kingdom: Animalia
- Phylum: Chordata
- Class: Amphibia
- Order: Urodela
- Family: Plethodontidae
- Genus: Desmognathus
- Species: D. ochrophaeus

Binomial name
- Desmognathus ochrophaeus Cope, 1859
- Range of D. ochrophaeus

= Allegheny Mountain dusky salamander =

Species of amphibian

The Allegheny Mountain dusky salamander (Desmognathus ochrophaeus) is a species in the Plethodontidae (lungless salamander) family native to eastern North America.

== Distribution and habitat ==
It is found in the eastern United States, as well as in the Niagara Glen Nature Reserve adjacent to the lower Niagara River in southern Ontario, and a single disjunct population in southern Quebec, Canada. Its natural habitats are temperate forests, rivers, intermittent rivers, freshwater springs, and rocky areas.

== Description ==
Desmognathus ochrophaeus is a medium-sized salamander that can grow to about 10 cm in length. Adults are brownish and can have a widely variable coloration pattern. Usually, it has a light stripe down the back, with a row of dark spots on the centre and flanked by dark pigments. As in all members of the genus, the hind legs are larger and stouter than the front legs. This species belongs to the "lungless salamander" family (Plethodontidae), whose adults must keep their skin moist to breathe. It is a somewhat terrestrial salamander that can be found under stones, logs, and bark near springs, streams, and other areas where the ground is saturated with water.

== Protection ==
Ontario's Endangered Species Act, 2007, protects D. ochrophaeus from being killed, harmed, or possessed. Salamanders are protected on Niagara Parks Commission property under the Niagara Parks Act, which makes it illegal to hunt, trap, or molest any animal without a government permit. A Dusky Salamander Recovery Team has been established to develop a strategy for the recovery of this species and the related northern dusky salamander (D. fuscus).

Canadian populations of D. ochrophaeus are divided into two segments, each of which is designated endangered under Schedule 1 of the Species at Risk Act. The first is the Carolinian population, native to Ontario, which received endangered status in 2009. The second population, the Appalachian population, is found in a small area of Quebec and was designated as endangered in April 2021. Previously, from 1998 to 2007, the populations were treated together as a COSEWIC "Species of Special Concern."
