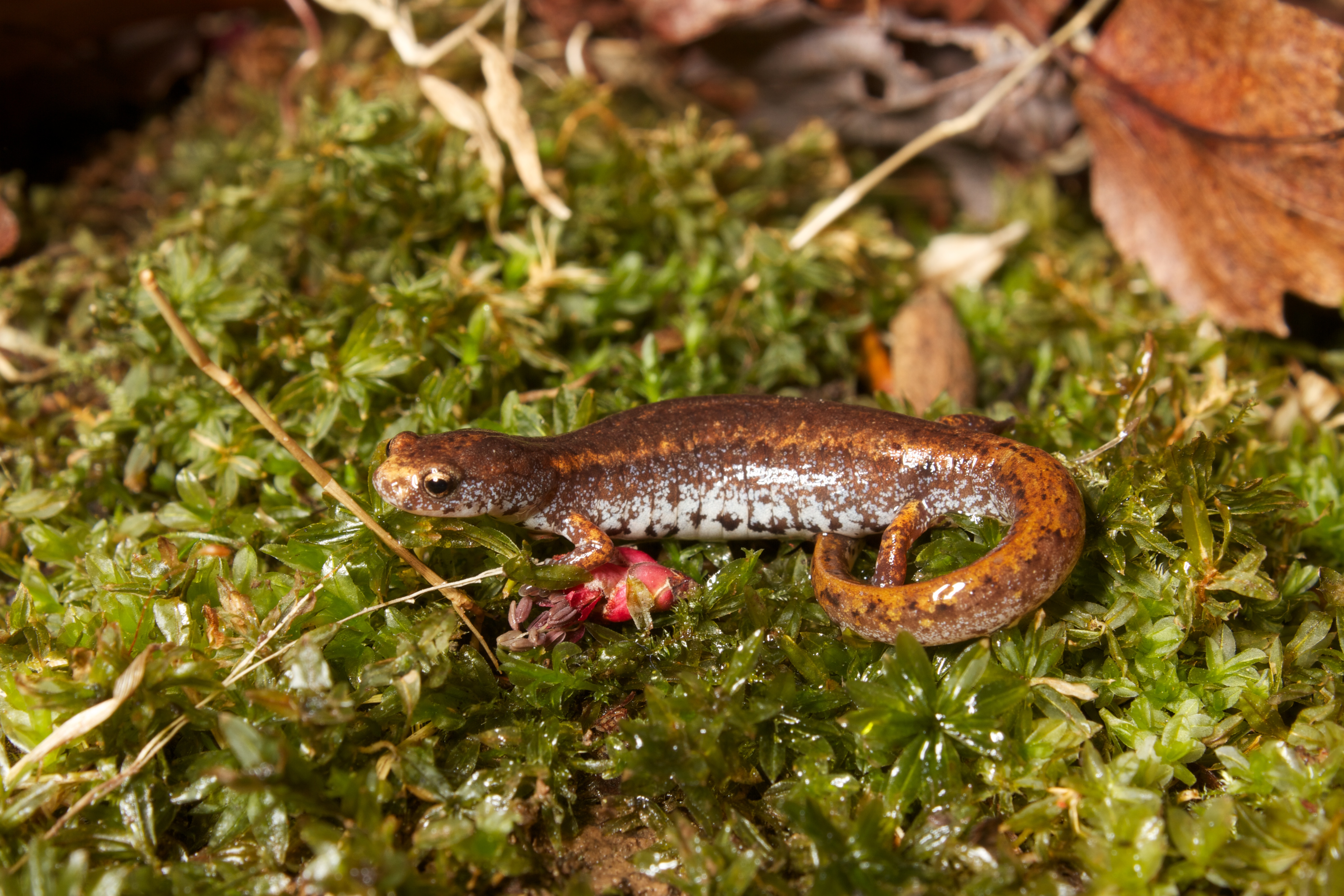

Conservation status
- Least Concern (IUCN 3.1)

Scientific classification
- Kingdom: Animalia
- Phylum: Chordata
- Class: Amphibia
- Order: Urodela
- Family: Plethodontidae
- Subfamily: Hemidactyliinae
- Genus: Hemidactylium (Tschudi, 1838)
- Species: H. scutatum

Binomial name
- Hemidactylium scutatum (Temminck, 1838)
- Range of H. scutatum

= Four-toed salamander =

Species of salamander

The four-toed salamander (Hemidactylium scutatum) is a lungless salamander native to eastern North America. It is the only species of the monotypic genus Hemidactylium.

== Description ==
The four-toed salamander can be recognized by its white underbelly sprinkled with black dots. Its back varies from orange-brownish to red-brownish; its flanks are grayish. The body and the limbs are elongated. The snout is short, and the eyes are prominent. The tail color is usually brighter than the back, and you can observe a constriction at the body/tail junction. The posterior limbs have four toes (hence its name), a good identification criterion but hard to use in the field. This species rarely exceeds 10 cm (3.9 in) in length. In the breeding season (late October to early December) males have enlarged premaxillary teeth and truncated squarish snouts, which are round in females. The juveniles show a tail shorter than the body.

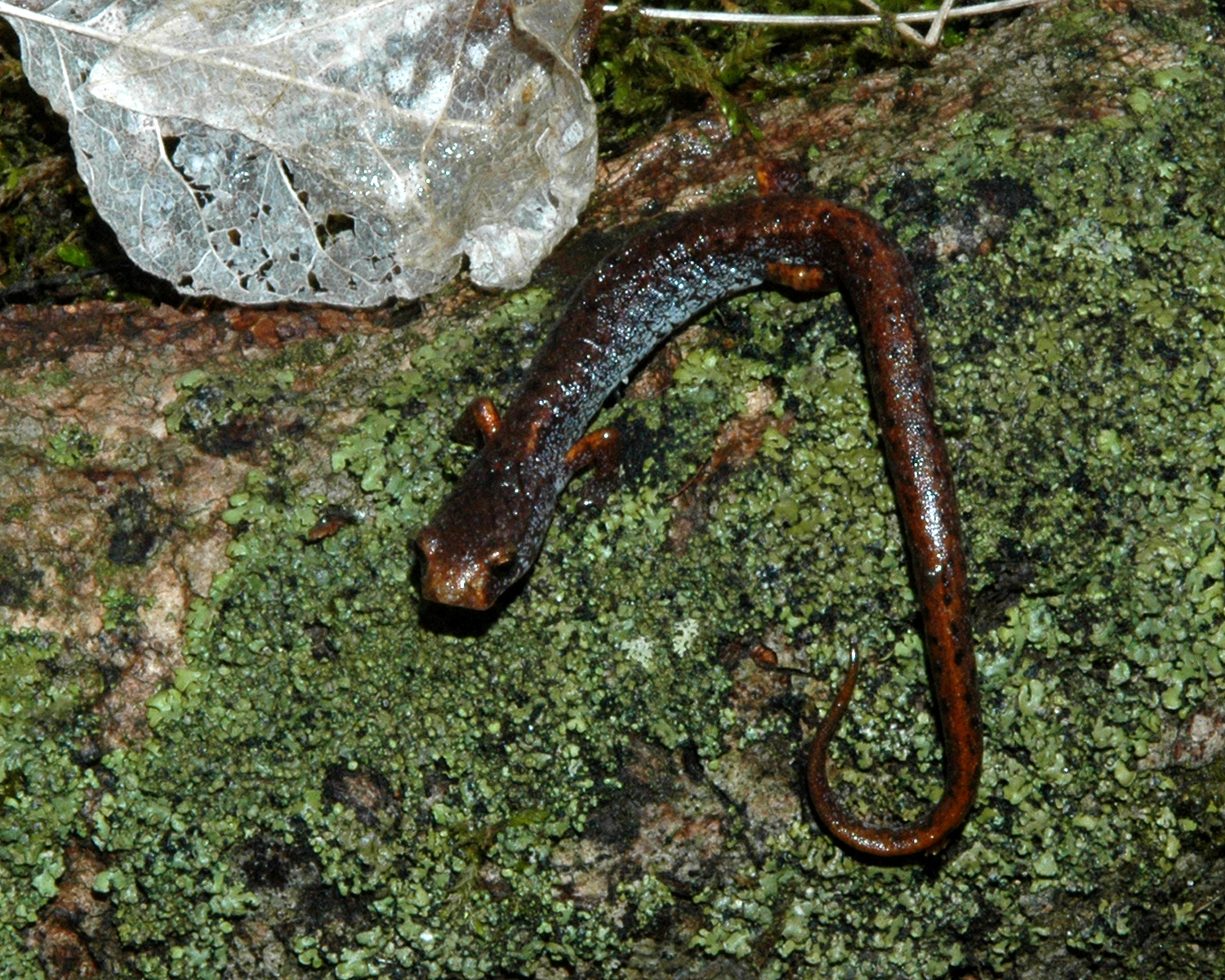
Four-toed salamander (Hemidactylium scutatum), Vermilion County, Illinois (26 February 2009)

The four-toed salamander can be easily mistaken for the redback salamander (Plethodon cinereus) in the wild. The redback salamander's underbelly has more numerous black markings. Unlike the four-toed salamander, the redback salamander has no constriction at the tail base, and its posterior limbs show five digits.

== Reproduction ==
Mating occurs in terrestrial areas throughout the autumn months. In early spring the females nest on land, along the banks of small ponds. After the 4–6 week embryonic period, the larvae hatch and make their way to the adjacent pond. Four-toed salamanders undergo a relatively short aquatic larval period, when compared to other species of the same family, ranging between 3 and 6 weeks.

== Self defense ==
The four-toed salamander has three main forms of self-defense against predators. The first is that it purposely sheds off its tail to distract the enemy. When the tail comes off, it is still wiggling around. The enemy gets distracted, giving the salamander time to get away. The second form of defense is playing dead. When threatened, this salamander will have a short burst of violent thrashes and then stop dead in its tracks. It will stay frozen like this until it feels the threat is gone. The third and final form of defense is curling up and putting its tail on its back, offering it in exchange for its life.

== Nesting behavior ==
There are three methods of nesting that have been documented in the females of H. scutatum, which can fall into one of two categories: solitary or communal/joint nesting. Solitary nesters lay and brood only their eggs. Communal nesting is normally one female brooding the eggs of two or more, up to 14, females of the same species. In this method the females either lay their eggs and leave the nest, or lay their eggs and stay to brood their eggs as well as those of the deserting females. About one-third of the nests of a population are joint nests, while between 50% and 70% of females lay their eggs in joint nests each year.

Oophagy has also been reported in H. scutatum, where one female would eat several eggs of another female before laying her eggs in a communal nest.

== Habitat ==
This species' favored habitats are sphagnum bogs, grassy areas surrounding beaver ponds, and deciduous or mixed forests rich with mosses. The four-toed salamander will use the sphagnum bogs during reproduction, but uses the forest habitat during the summer. It overwinters in terrestrial habitat, using old burrows or cavities created by rotting roots, below the freezing depth. It will frequently overwinter in groups, sometimes with other amphibians such as the red-backed salamander.

In Canada, the four-toed salamander can be found in southern Ontario and Quebec, in Nova Scotia, and a single population was found in New Brunswick in 1983. In the United States, it can be found from Maine to Minnesota and as far as Alabama in the south. They have also been found in eastern Kentucky.

The home range of the species is not known. It was believed that the different elements of its habitat (breeding, summer and overwintering) had to be within 100 m of each other, but recent observations might suggest this to be an underestimation.

== Diet ==
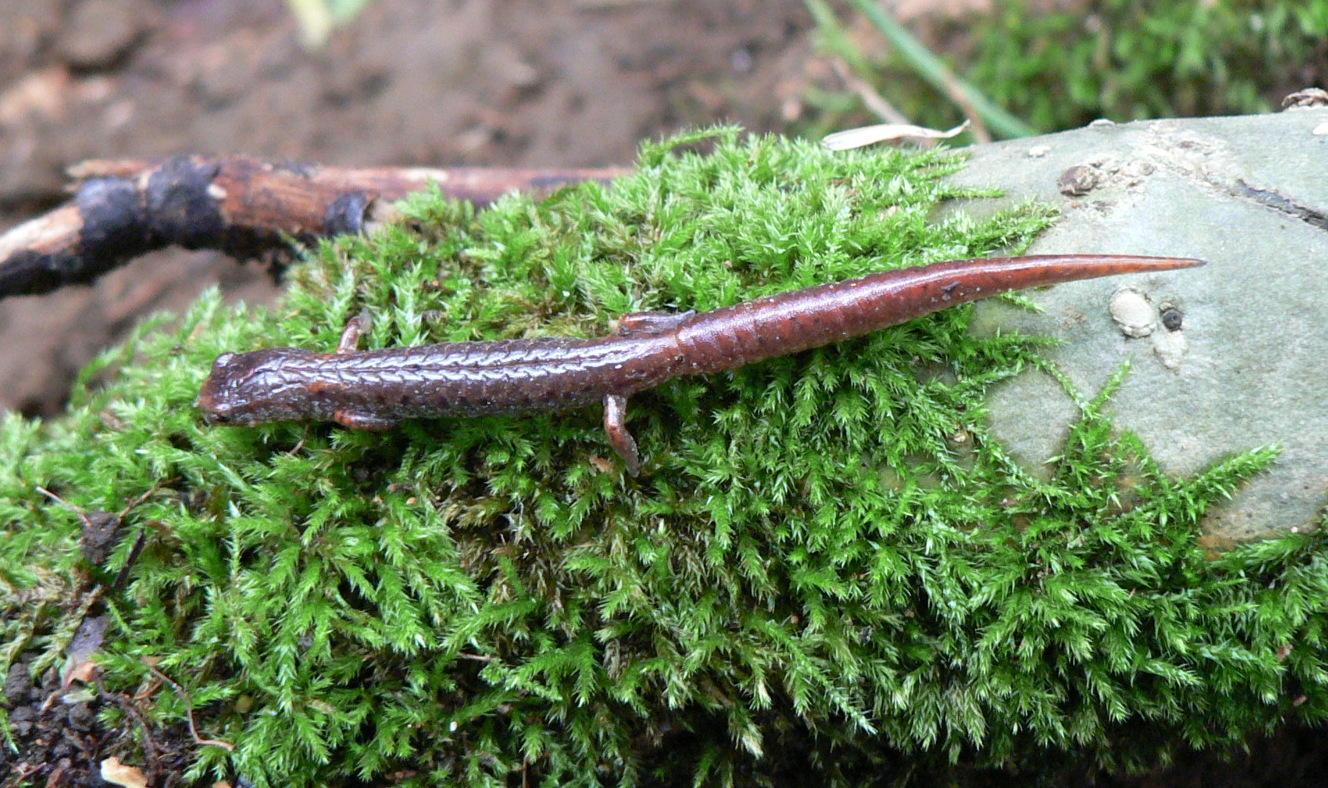
H. scutatum has a distinct basal constriction of the tail.

Four-toed salamanders feed mostly on small invertebrates, such as spiders, worms, ticks, springtails (collembola), ground beetles (Carabidae), and other insects. Larvae love small aquatic crustaceans.

== Predation ==
Larvae are eaten by other salamanders (adults and larvae), fish, and aquatic beetles. Shrews, snakes, and some ground beetles feast on this species. When it feels threatened, H. scutatum will use autotomy (drops its tail, still wiggling) to distract the attention of predators.

== Conservation status ==
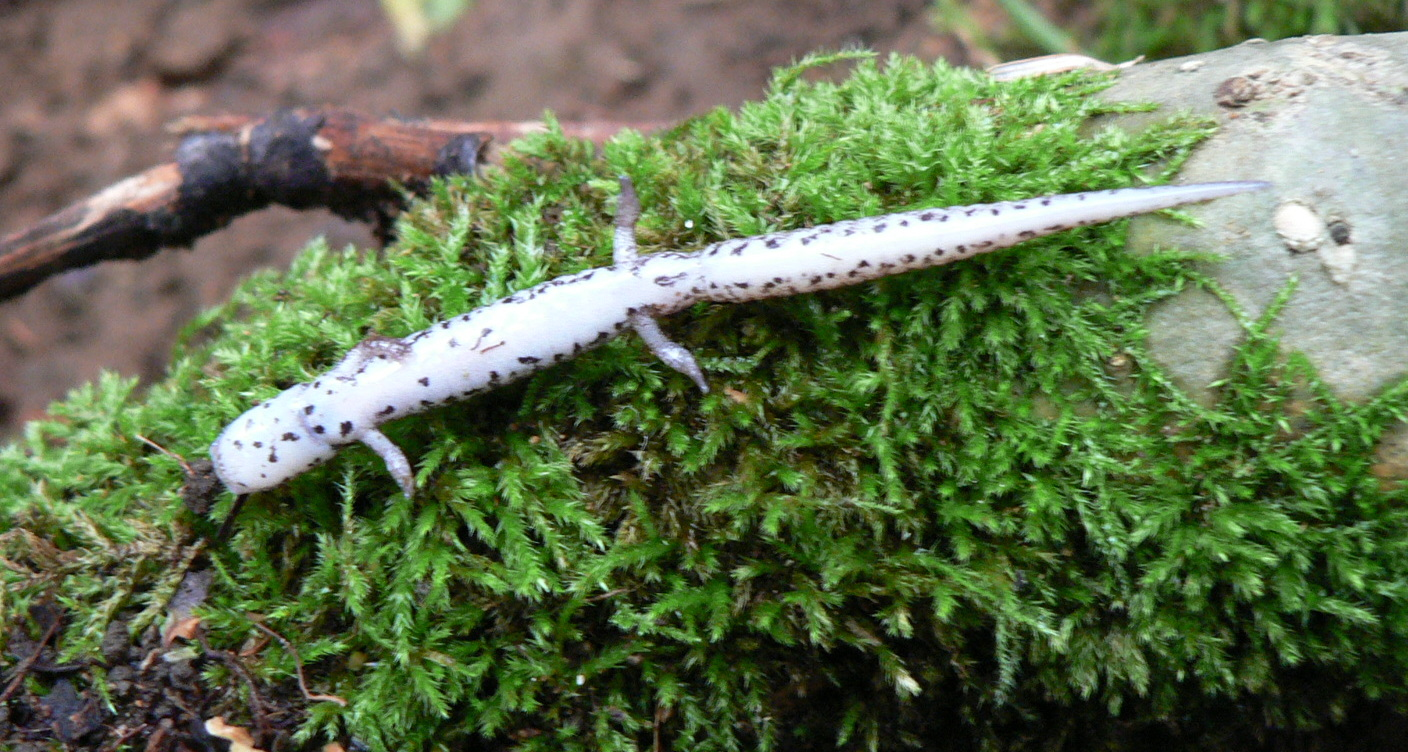
Ventral surface is brilliant white, with scattered black spots.

Although it is rare, or at least rarely seen in Canada, Committee on the Status of Endangered Wildlife in Canada (COSEWIC) does not consider H. scutatum to be at risk. It is also listed as a species of least concern by the International Union for Conversation of Nature (IUCN) due to the wide distribution and assumed large population. But it is at risk in some provinces such as in Quebec (S3 Rare in the province; usually between 20 and 100 occurrences in the province; may have fewer occurrences, but with a large number of individuals in some populations; may be susceptible to large-scale disturbances). Its status in the United States ranges from threatened (Illinois) to special concern (Wisconsin, Ohio, and Missouri).
