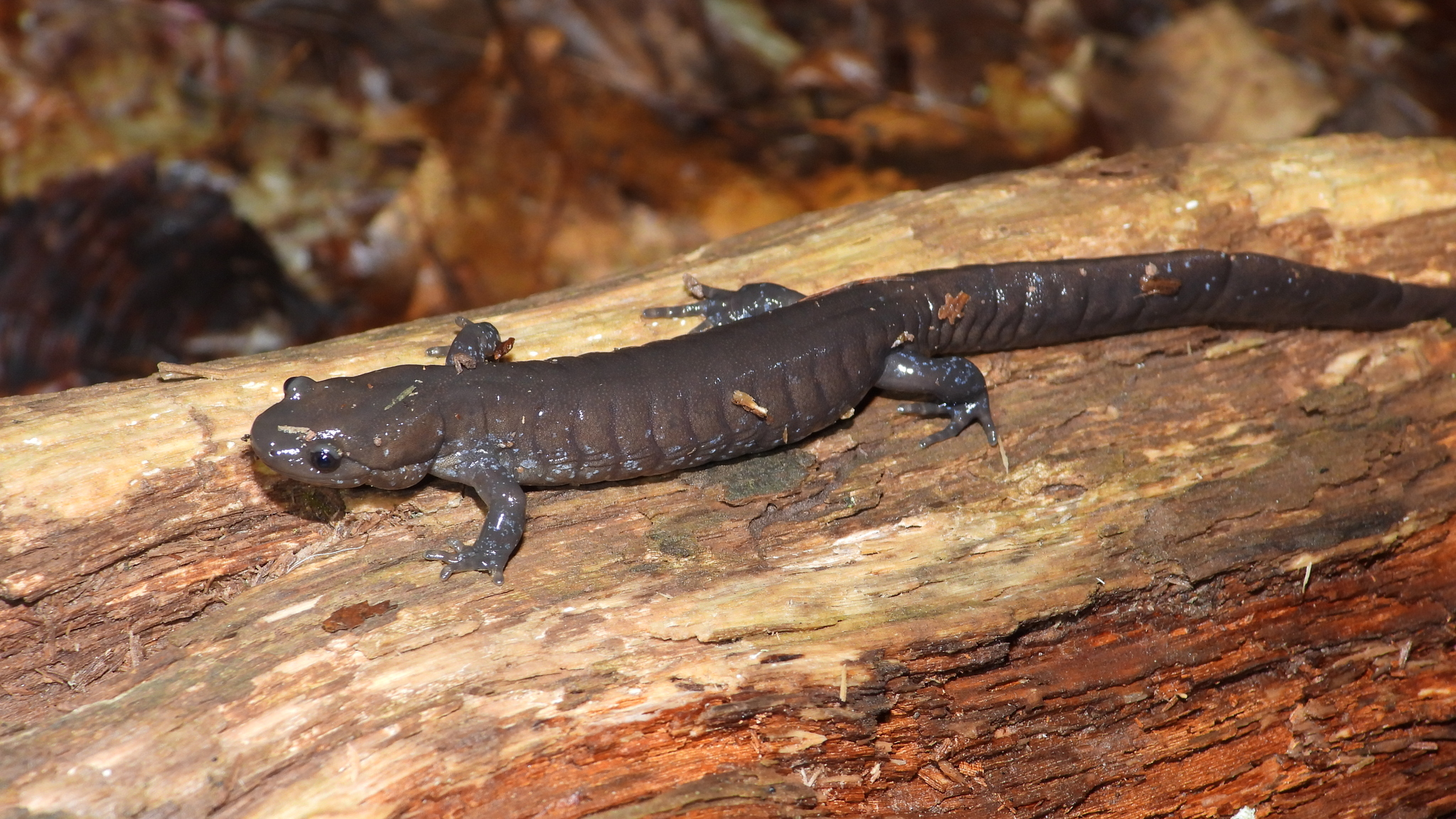

Conservation status
- Least Concern (IUCN 3.1)

Scientific classification
- Kingdom: Animalia
- Phylum: Chordata
- Class: Amphibia
- Order: Urodela
- Family: Ambystomatidae
- Genus: Ambystoma
- Species: A. jeffersonianum

Binomial name
- Ambystoma jeffersonianum (Green, 1827)
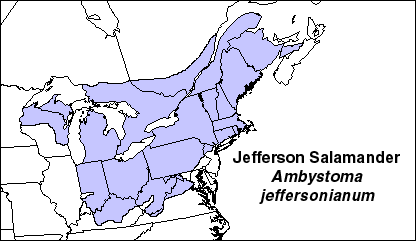
- Range of A. jeffersonianum

= Jefferson salamander =

Species of amphibian

The Jefferson salamander (Ambystoma jeffersonianum) is a mole salamander native to the northeastern United States, southern and central Ontario, and southwestern Quebec. It was named after Jefferson College in Pennsylvania.

It is typically dark gray, brown, or black on its dorsal surface, but a lighter shade on its anterior. Some individuals may also have silver or blue specks on their sides; the area around the vent is usually gray. These salamanders are slender, with a wide nose and distinctive long toes, and range in size from 11 to 18 cm (4.3 to 7.1 in).

Like other mole salamanders, the Jefferson salamander burrows; they have well-developed lungs suited for this purpose. Nocturnal by nature, they can be spotted by day during the mating season. Breeding occurs in early spring, after the snow in the area has melted.

== Reproduction ==
Eggs are laid in small agglomerations attached to submerged twigs or other natural support at the pond's edge. Clutches can contain between 5 and 60 eggs, averaging about 30. The age at which they first breed, and the frequency with which they breed, are unknown; females are estimated to first breed at 22 months, and males at 34 months. Eggs develop rapidly, and may hatch within 15 days. Larvae stay in the pond from two to four months, during which time they grow to between 3 and 8 times their hatching size.

A unique reproductive tactic for the Bluespotted-Jefferson Salamander Complex exists in nature. The Jefferson salamander is now known not to breed in the lab with the blue-spotted salamander, which was previously thought to produce "hybrids", the silvery salamander and Tremblay's salamander, between this supposed mating of Jefferson salamander and Blue-spotted salamander. The silvery salamander and Tremblay's salamander are now known through genetic testing to be polyploid females (only 2% of males survive and they are sterile). These most often possess two of each chromosome from the Jefferson salamander and one of each chromosome from the blue-spotted salamander, resulting in an LJJ genotype (also called a Tremblay's salamander.) This genotype results when these polyploid females mate with a pure Jefferson salamander male, incorporating (often in warmer water conditions) the chromosome from the pure male Jefferson salamander into her egg, usually having an LJ diploid chromosome set or LJJ triploid chromosome set, to produce LJJ or LJJJ offspring, respectively. Often in cooler conditions, the LJ or LJJ female may mate with the Jefferson salamander male and only "borrow" his sperm to trigger genetic cloning of herself, not adding his chromosome (J) to the DNA of the embryo. The same polyploid reproductive strategy occurs for other mole salamander species. The presence of these polyploids makes it difficult to visually identify which species an individual may be, skewing population measures for both species.

== Habitat ==
The secretive adults tend to hide under stones or logs, or in leaf litter and other underbrush in deciduous forests during damp conditions. They are usually not found in conifer forests, likely due to the dryness and prickliness of some pine and spruce needles, which may injure amphibians with their thin skins. They are found burrowing underground for most of the year during dry or freezing conditions. They must get below the frost line in order to survive winter conditions in northern latitudes. They often burrow in rich sandy soils found in upland deciduous forests or sometimes in older-growth damp hemlock forests.

Because breeding sites are usually close to the over-wintering burrows, migration to their breeding area is quick, and usually occurs during or immediately after a heavy rainfall. The breeding sites they choose are fishless ponds and vernal pools, filled with spring snow meltwater in northern latitudes. Some breeding ponds may be hundreds of yards (meters) away from their forest home in fragmented landscapes.

Jefferson salamanders are one of the first amphibians to emerge in springtime at the northern edge of their range in southern Ontario where they are seen "snowshoeing" across the still frozen understory of the forest to reach partially melted breeding ponds. Males migrate first with females following shortly thereafter. These salamanders have small pores on their heads which exude a whitish liquid when they are handled, suggesting that they may leave a scent trail during migration, Ambystoma jeffersonianum is often found in the same habitat as the spotted salamander.

== Food ==
The larvae are carnivorous, typically consuming aquatic invertebrates. An insufficient food supply may result in cannibalistic behaviour. Adults are also carnivorous, eating a variety of small invertebrates.

== Status ==
The Jefferson salamander is a species of least concern globally, but its habitat is threatened in parts of its range. In Ontario, it has been classified as an endangered species since 11 June 2011, and throughout Canada it is a threatened species. The government of Ontario has designated the species as a specially protected amphibian, which provides protection to the species and its habitats.

It is also considered a state-threatened species in Illinois.
