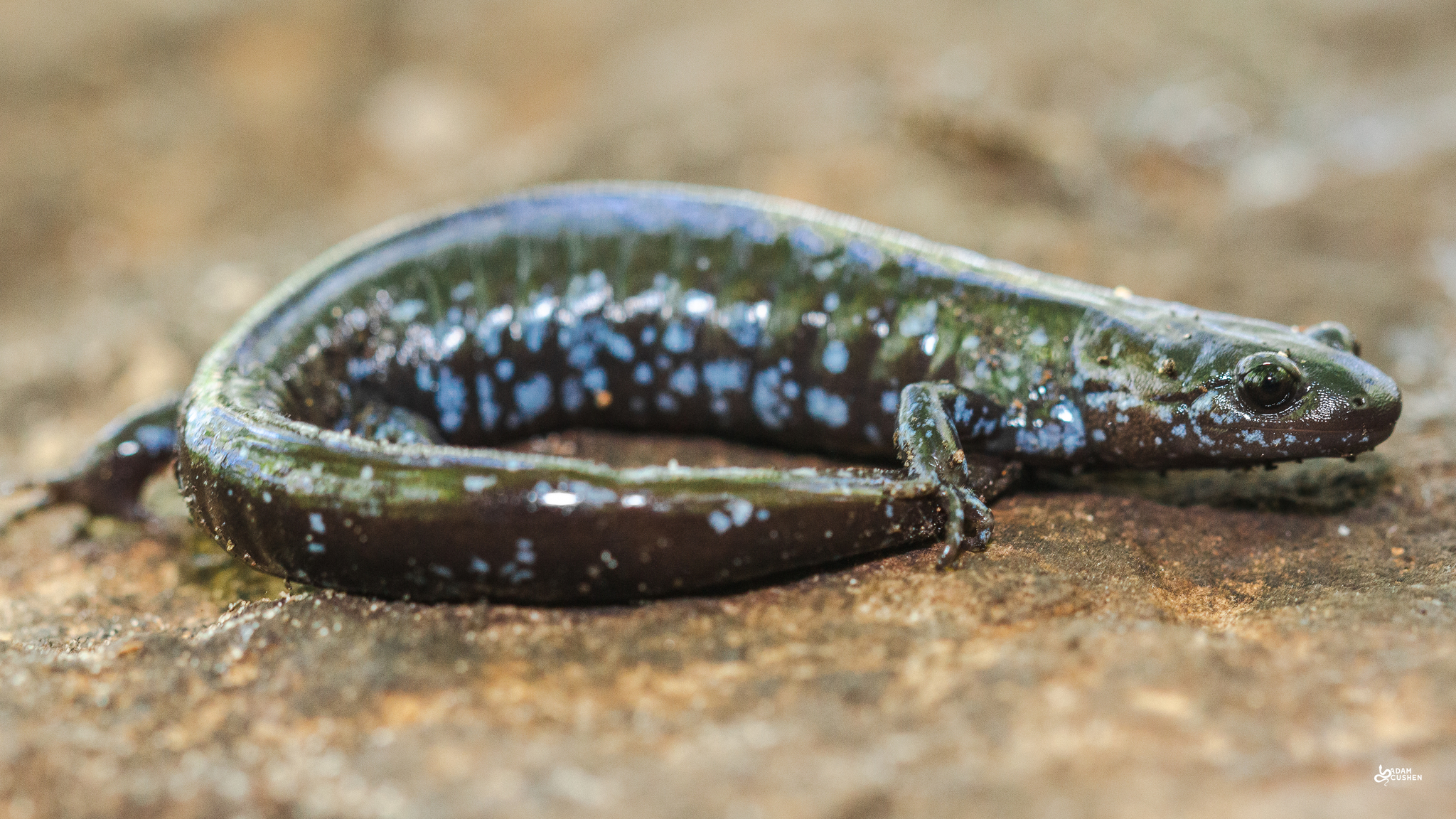

Conservation status
- Least Concern (IUCN 3.1)

Scientific classification
- Kingdom: Animalia
- Phylum: Chordata
- Class: Amphibia
- Order: Urodela
- Family: Ambystomatidae
- Genus: Ambystoma
- Species: A. laterale

Binomial name
- Ambystoma laterale Hallowell, 1856
- Range of A. laterale in pink

= Blue-spotted salamander =

Species of amphibian

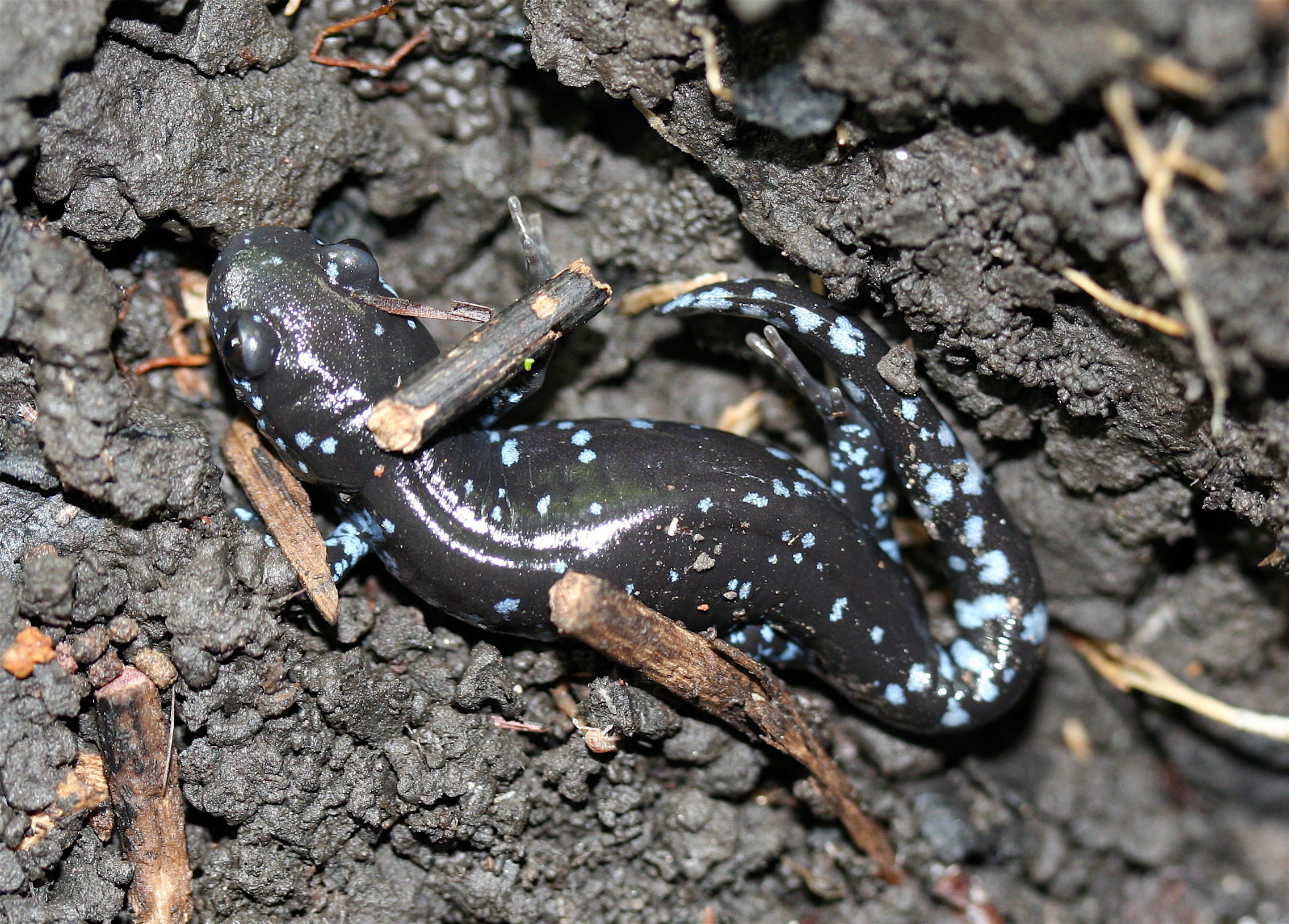

The blue-spotted salamander (Ambystoma laterale) is a mole salamander native to the Great Lakes states and northeastern United States, and parts of Ontario and Quebec in Canada. Their range is known to extend to James Bay to the north, and southeastern Manitoba to the west. Blue-spotted salamanders include unisexual lineages that can reproduce without fertilization (gynogenesis).

== Description ==
Blue-spotted salamanders are between 10 and 14 cm (3.9 and 5.5 in) in length, of which the tail comprises 40%. Generally, males are slightly smaller than their female counterparts. Their skin is bluish-black, with characteristic blue and white flecks on its back, and bluish-white spots on the sides of its body and tail. They have elongated bodies. The vent is typically black, which contrasts with the paler belly. Larvae that have transformed may have yellow splotches; these turn blue once the individual becomes terrestrial. Occasionally, a melanistic individual may be found in the wild.

They have long toes: four on the front feet and five on the hind feet. Typically, specimens will have 12–14 costal grooves. Males tend to be smaller than females, though they have longer, flattened tails.

Blue-spotted salamanders are nocturnal, staying underground during the day and coming out at night to find food.

== Geographic range ==
Blue-spotted salamanders can be found in the northeastern parts of North America. New England in the United States has large populations of many types of salamanders, including Ambystoma laterale. Blue-spotted salamanders can be found as far west as the Great Lakes in Michigan and up into the eastern provinces of Canada.

== Habitat ==
Blue-spotted salamanders are primarily found in moist, deciduous hardwood forests and swampy woodlands with sandy soil, though they can be found in coniferous forests and fields too. They prefer vernal pools that retain water into mid-summer, to ensure access to a suitable breeding habitat. Blue-spotted salamanders are philopatric and largely dependent on the availability of ephemeral pools. Underbrush, leaf litter, rocks and logs are commonly used for shelter. Studies are beginning to show that habitat selection may also be affected by factors such as light pollution and chemical hues. Blue spotted salamanders are facing habitat loss.

== Reproduction ==
Blue-spotted salamanders mate through the depositing and collecting of a spermatophore. A spermatophore is a packet of sperm that is deposited by the male. Reproduction is initiated by the male by taking hold of the female and rubbing her head with his chin. The female's eggs can be fertilized by the sperm in the spermatophore, but she must be in close proximity to the spermatophore. The male will try to position her so she is close enough that this can happen.

Eggs are laid in small agglomerations attached to twigs, rocks or plants at the edge of a woodland pond or ditch. Clutches average a dozen eggs, and females may lay up to 500 eggs yearly. Males and females first mate when two years old. Breeding occurs in early spring near vernal pools.

Eggs take about one month to hatch. At hatching, larvae have a well-developed mouth and eyes, as well as external gills and broad tail fins. Front limbs form at two weeks, and hind limbs form at three weeks. Larvae live underwater until they transform into the terrestrial form of the salamander. While still in water, the larvae will have more neutral coloring such as browns, greens and grays. The spots will also be yellow instead of blue. It will fully transform to its terrestrial state by late summer.

=== Interaction with unisexual populations and species ===
Blue-spotted salamanders are known to be associated with unisexual (all-female) populations of ancient origin. The unisexual females often look like blue-spotted salamanders but have hybrid genomes and require sperm from a co-occurring, related species to fertilize their eggs and initiate development. In regions where Ambystoma laterale co-occurs with unisexual members of the Ambystoma complex, males can contribute sperm to support reproduction through kleptogenesis, a system in which hybrid females use the sperm to trigger egg development and can sometimes incorporate genetic material into their offspring. Usually the eggs then discard the sperm genome and develop asexually (i.e., gynogenesis, with premeiotic doubling); however, they may incorporate the genome from the sperm into the resulting offspring. Sperm incorporation commonly takes the form of genome addition (resulting in ploidy elevation in the offspring), or genome replacement, wherein one of the maternal genomes is discarded. This unique mode of reproduction has been termed kleptogenesis by Bogart and his colleagues.

In the northern portion of the blue-spotted salamander's geographic range, there is an area where this species interacts with a unisexual population of salamanders. The unisexual population of salamanders interacts with the blue-spotted salamanders to initiate reproduction, as the unisexual species is, for the most part, female. This interaction can be somewhat detrimental to blue-spotted salamander population because genes of the unisexual population are being promoted, creating competition between the two groups. Pure-diploid blue-spotted salamanders (A. laterale) are among the rarest amphibians in the northeastern United States.

=== Relationship with Tremblay's salamander ===
Female Tremblay's salamanders (Ambystoma tremblayi) breed with male blue-spotted salamanders from March to April. Eggs are laid singly or in small masses of 6 to 10 eggs on debris at pond bottom. The males' chromosome contribution only stimulates the egg's development; its genetic material is ignored.

== Defense ==
Blue-spotted salamanders have several defense mechanisms. The blue spots on the salamander's back and tail make it difficult for predators to clearly see the salamander. Blue-spotted salamanders also have specialized glands on their tails that secrete a milky substance which is harmful to predators. Having a large tail is also advantageous for a salamander as it can use its tail to shield its body from a predator. The large tail covered in a toxic substance would be the first part of the salamander that comes in contact with a predator's mouth, hopefully causing the predator to drop the salamander.

== Diet ==
Blue-spotted salamanders are carnivorous, eating invertebrates such as worms, snails, slugs, centipedes, and spiders, as well as insects. Like most salamanders, blue-spotted salamanders stay underground during the day. However, at night they will emerge from the soil to feed. They may also emerge to feed when the environment is rainy or moist.
