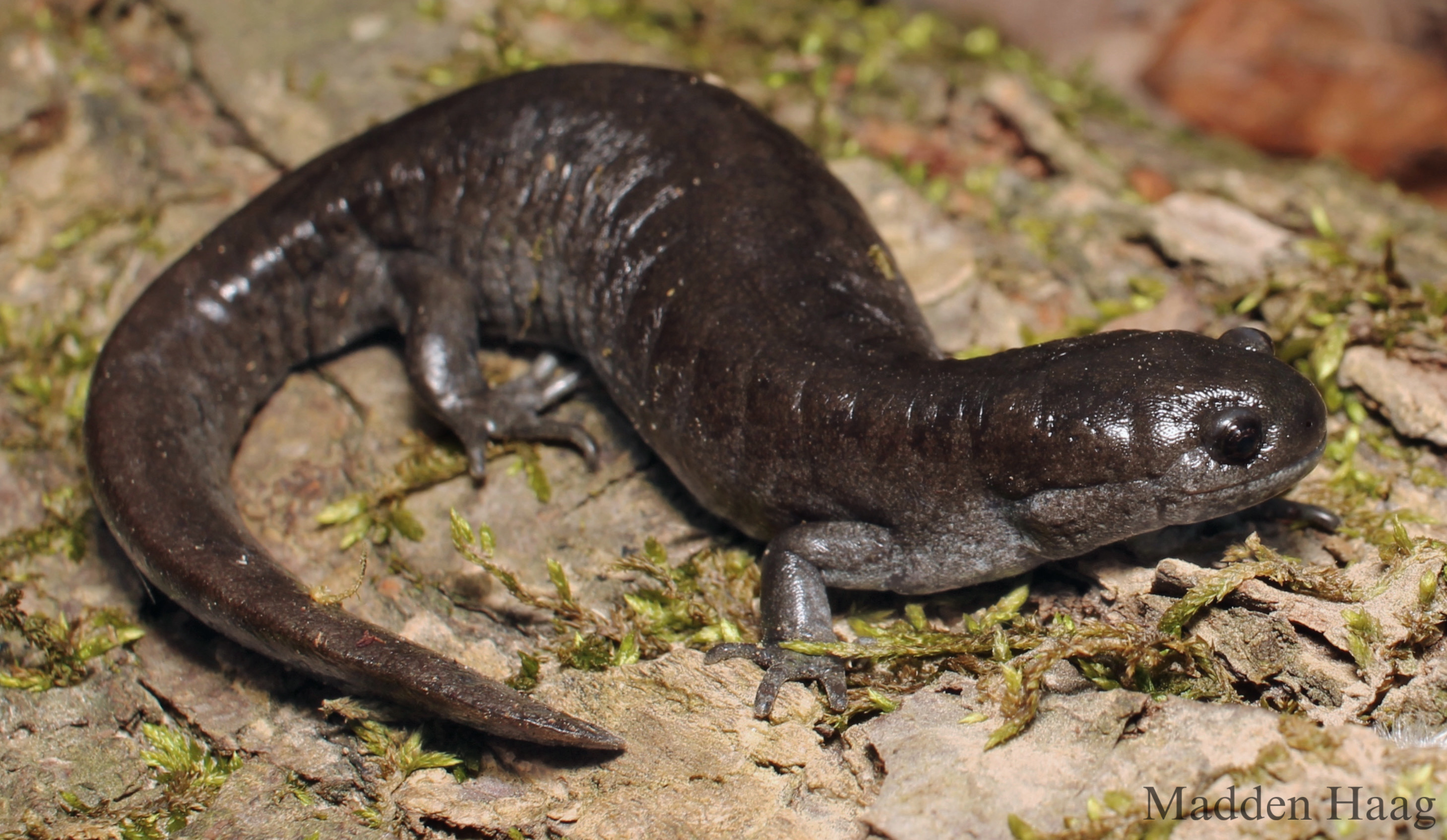

Conservation status
- Least Concern (IUCN 3.1)

Scientific classification
- Kingdom: Animalia
- Phylum: Chordata
- Class: Amphibia
- Order: Urodela
- Family: Ambystomatidae
- Genus: Ambystoma
- Species: A. texanum

Binomial name
- Ambystoma texanum (Matthes, 1855)

Synonyms
- Salamandra texana Matthes, 1855; Amblystoma microstomum Cope, 1861; Chondrotus microstomus Cope, 1887; Ambystoma schmidti Taylor, 1939; Linguaelapsus schmidti Freytag, 1959; Linguaelapsus texanus Freytag, 1959; Ambystoma nothagenes Kraus, 1985

= Small-mouth salamander =

Species of amphibian

The small-mouth salamander (Ambystoma texanum) is a species of mole salamander found in the central United States, from the Great Lakes region in Michigan to Nebraska, south to Texas, and east to Tennessee, with a population in Canada, in Pelee, Ontario. It is sometimes referred to as the Texas salamander, porphyry salamander, or the narrow-mouthed salamander. The Kelley's Island salamander (Ambystoma nothagenes) was synonymized with A. texanum in 1995.

== Description ==
The small-mouth salamander grows from 4.5 to 7.0 in. It is typically black or dark brown in color with light-grey or silvery-colored flecking, or grey blotching. It has a fairly small head, relative to its body, and a long tail. Males are typically smaller than females. Their bellies are black, often with tiny flecks, and have 14 to 15 costal grooves.

== Behavior ==
Small-mouth salamanders are nocturnal, often subterranean, preferring moist habitats near permanent bodies of water. Breeding occurs in the spring, with groups of salamanders congregating near the water. Females can lay up to 700 eggs, which they attach in small clumps of up to 30 eggs at a time, to rocks or vegetation under the water. Their diets include insects, slugs, and earthworms. Larvae hatch at 0.5 in (13 mm); they metamorphose in May to June at about 1.6 in (40 mm). When disturbed, the small-mouth salamander raises its tail and waves it back and forth. Being shy and sensitive, it shares breeding pools with larger spotted salamanders and marbled salamanders.

== Habitat and range ==
Small-mouth salamanders live in moist pine woodlands and deciduous forest bottomlands, tallgrass prairies, farming areas, near temporary ponds, and along streams. Their range is from western West Virginia south to the Gulf of Mexico, west to Kansas, Oklahoma, and Texas.

== Conservation ==
The only known Canadian population is on Pelee Island in Lake Erie. It is listed as endangered by the Committee on the Status of Endangered Wildlife in Canada.
