= List of mountains named Sugarloaf =

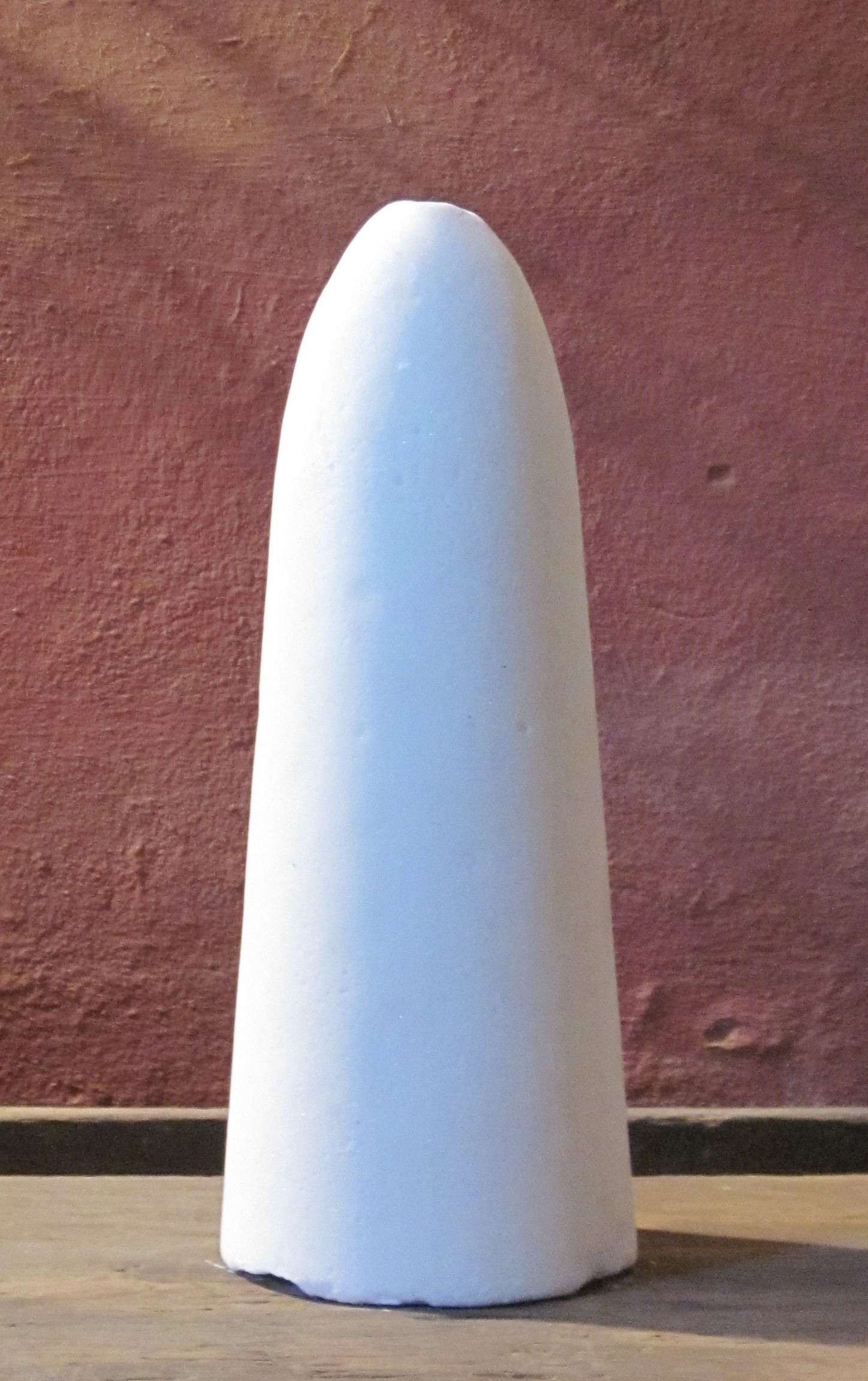
An actual sugarloaf, after which many mountains are named.

The name Sugarloaf or Sugar Loaf applies to numerous raised topographic landforms worldwide: mountains, hills, peaks, summits, buttes, ridges, rock formations, bornhardt, inselberg, etc. Landforms resembling the characteristic conical shape of a sugarloaf were often so named.

== Austria ==
- Zuckerhütl ("Little Sugarloaf"), highest peak of the Stubai Alps, Tyrol

== Australia ==
- Mount Sugarloaf (New South Wales)
- Sugarloaf Peak and Sugarloaf Saddle in Cathedral Range, Victoria
- Mt Sugarloaf, a peak on Mount Leura, Victoria
- Mt Sugarloaf, in Kinglake National Park
- Sugarloaf, in Mount Buangor State Park
- Mt Sugarloaf, peak in the Pyrete Range of Lerderderg State Park, Victoria
- The Sugarloaf, Hallett Cove, South Australia
- Goulds Sugarloaf, Cradle Mountain-Lake St Clair National Park, Tasmania

== Brazil ==
- Sugarloaf Mountain (Pão de Açúcar), in Rio de Janeiro

== Canada ==
- Sugarloaf Mountain (New Brunswick)
- Wilkie Sugar Loaf in Nova Scotia
- Pain de Sucre ("Sugarloaf") summit of Mont Saint-Hilaire, Quebec
- Mount Cheminis or Mont Chaudron on the Quebec-Ontario border
- Sugarloaf Mountain, Nanaimo, British Columbia

== Greenland ==
- Sugarloaf Mountain in Kangerlussuaq
- Gammel Sukkertoppen (Old Sugar Loaf) and Ny Sukkertoppen (New Sugar Loaf), the Danish names of Kangaamiut and Maniitsoq, respectively, named for the mountains surrounding the former. Dutch whalers and traders referred to the mountains as Zuikerbrood.

== Ireland ==
- Great Sugar Loaf, a 501 m peak in east County Wicklow
- Little Sugar Loaf, a 342 m peak in east County Wicklow
- Sugarloaf (County Cork), a 574 m peak near Glengarriff in County Cork
- Sugarloaf (West Wicklow), a 552 m peak in west County Wicklow
- Sugarloaf Hill (Knockmealdowns), a 663 m peak in the Knockmealdowns on the Tipperary/Waterford border

== Italy and France ==
- Pain de Sucre, Pan di Zucchero, 3208m

== New Zealand ==
- Mount Sugarloaf (1238m), by Lake Heron, South Island, New Zealand
- Sugar Loaf Islands, near New Plymouth
- Sugarloaf (Christchurch), a peak in the Port Hills with a prominent transmission tower

== Norway ==
- Sukkertoppen (lit. 'Sugarloaf peak'), a 314m mountain on the island of Hessa in Ålesund, Norway

== Philippines ==
- Pan de Azucar Island in Iloilo province

== Sierra Leone ==
- Sugar Loaf (Freetown) is a mountain on the edge of the capital city

== United Kingdom ==
- Sugar Loaf, Carmarthenshire, Wales
- Sugar Loaf, Monmouthshire, Wales
- Sugarloaf Hill, Malvern, England
- Sugarloaf Hill, Folkestone Downs, England

== United States ==
- Sugar Loaf Mountain (Alaska)
- Sugarloaf Mountain (Cleburne County, Arkansas)
- Sugarloaf Mountain (Arizona), in Maricopa County
- Sugarloaf Mountain, in Chiricahua National Monument
- Sugarloaf Mountain (Butte County, California)
- Sugarloaf Mountain (Riverside County, California)
- Sugarloaf Mountain (San Bernardino County, California)
- Sugarloaf Mountain (San Mateo, California)
- Sugarloaf Ridge, situated in Sugarloaf Ridge State Park in Sonoma County, California
- Sugarloaf Dome
- Sugarloaf Mountain (Boulder County, Colorado)
- Sugarloaf Mountain (Florida), the highest point of peninsular Florida
- Sugarloaf Mountain (Rowan County, Kentucky)
- Sugarloaf Mountain (Maine)
- Sugarloaf Mountain (Maryland)
- Sugarloaf Mountain (Massachusetts)
- Sugarloaf Mountain (Marquette, Michigan)
- Sugar Loaf (Mackinac Island), a rock formation on Mackinac Island in Michigan
- Sugar Loaf (Winona, Minnesota)
- Middle and North Sugarloaf (New Hampshire)
- Sugarloaf (New York)
- Sugarloaf Hill (Putnam County, New York), and Sugarloaf Mountain (Dutchess County, New York), two adjacent peaks in the Hudson Highlands of New York
- Sugarloaf Mountain (Greene County, New York), one of the Catskill High Peaks
- Sugarloaf Mountain (Webb, New York), in the Town of Webb in Herkimer County, New York
- Sugar Loaf Mountain (Orange County, New York)
- Sugarloaf Mountain (Rutherford County, North Carolina)
- Sugarloaf (Geauga County, Ohio), one of the highest points of Northeast Ohio
- Sugarloaf Mountain (Ross County, Ohio), situated in Great Seal State Park, located in Chillicothe, Ohio
- Sugar Loaf Mountain (Oklahoma), summit with the most prominence in the state
- Sugarloaf Mountain (Pennsylvania), inside the eponymous Sugarloaf Township of Luzerne County
- Sugarloaf Mountain (South Carolina), near Patrick,(Chesterfield County, South Carolina)
- Sugarloaf Mountain (El Paso, Texas) in the Franklin Mountains State Park
- Sugarloaf Mountain (Gause, Texas), sacred to the Tonkawa tribe
- Sugarloaf Mountain (Utah), a mountain near the Alta Ski Area outside of Salt Lake City, Utah
- Sugarloaf Mountain (Wyoming), in the Snowy Range.
- Sugarloaf Mountain (Vermont), a prominence southeast of Sugarbush Resort.

== Uruguay ==
- Cerro Pan de Azúcar (Sugarloaf Hill), Maldonado

== See also ==
- For the Battle of Sugar Loaf Hill, see Battle of Okinawa
- Sugarloaf (New Zealand), communications tower at Port Hills, Christchurch
