= Carolina Sandhills =

Region of the southeast United States

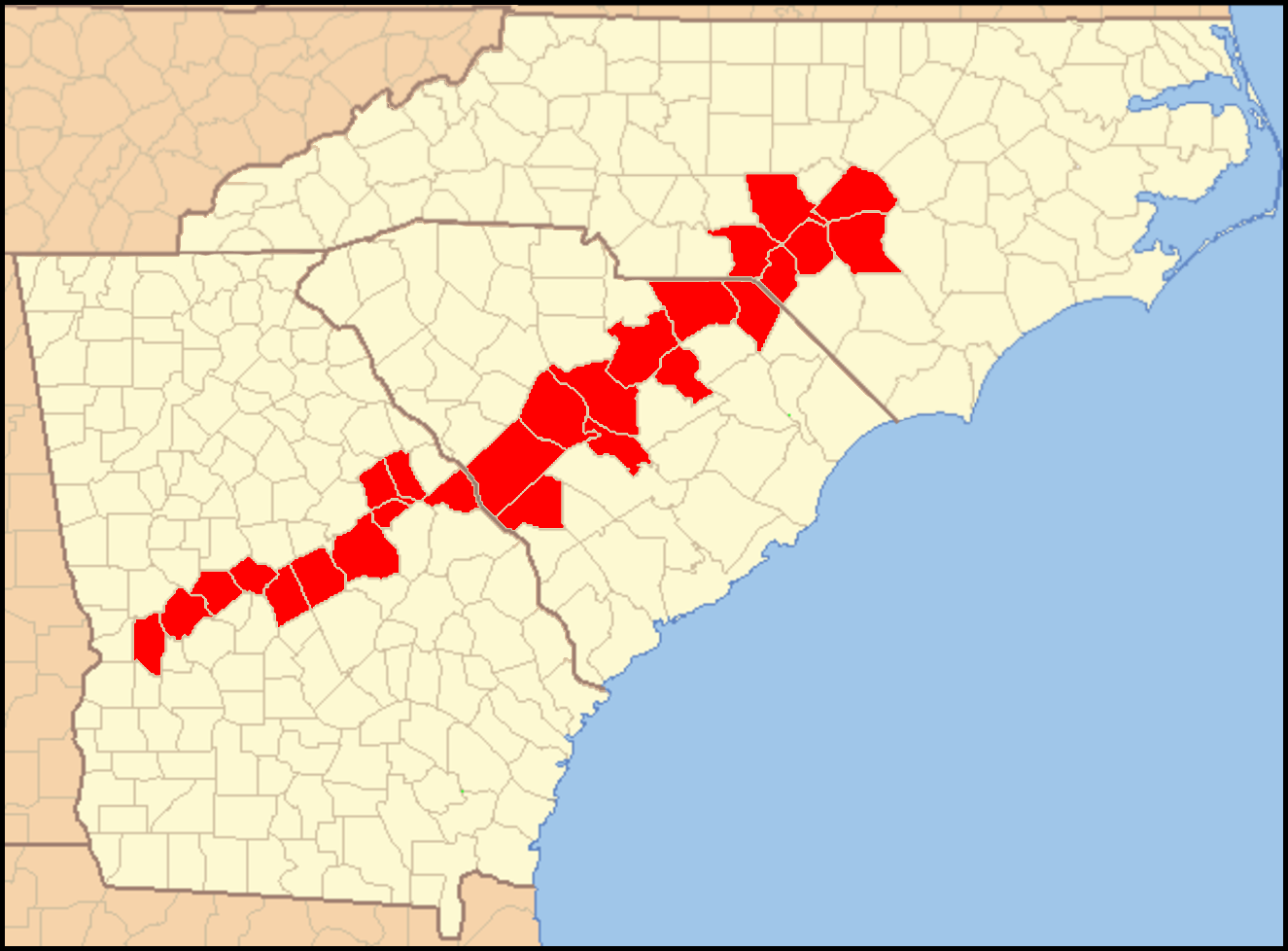
Counties often considered to be in the Carolina Sandhills physiogeographic region

The Sandhills or Carolina Sandhills is a 9.3-to-37.3-mile-wide (15.0 to 60.0 km) physiographic region within the U.S. Atlantic Coastal Plain province, along the updip (inland) margin of this province in the states of North Carolina, South Carolina, and Georgia. The extent of the Carolina Sandhills is shown in maps of the ecoregions of North Carolina, South Carolina, and Georgia. The region is also characterized by longleaf pine ecosystems that are maintained by frequent low-intensity fires and provide habitat for a variety of plant and animal species.

== Geology ==
The unconsolidated sand of the Carolina Sandhills is mapped as the Quaternary Pinehurst Formation, and is interpreted as eolian (wind-blown) sand sheets and dunes that were mobilized episodically from approximately 75,000 to 6,000 years ago. Most of the published luminescence ages from the sand are coincident with the last glaciation, a time when the southeastern United States was characterized by colder air temperatures, stronger winds, and less vegetation.

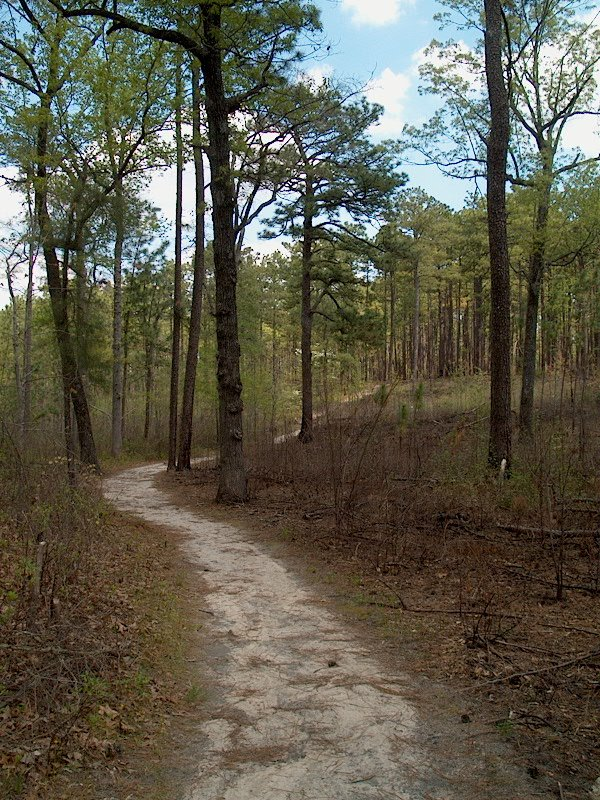
A hiking trail snakes through Weymouth Woods in the sandhills region of North Carolina.

The Carolina Sandhills region also contains outcrops of Cretaceous-age (~100 million years old) strata of sand, sandstone, and clay that are interpreted as fluvial (river) deposits. These Cretaceous strata are thought to be the source of the sand of the Pinehurst Formation. In South Carolina and North Carolina, these Cretaceous strata are mapped as the Middendorf Formation. A notable hill of these Cretaceous strata is Sugarloaf Mountain in the Sand Hills State Forest in Chesterfield County, South Carolina.

== Soils ==
The soils of the Carolina Sandhills are very sandy. According to soil surveys of the U.S. Department of Agriculture, many soils of the Carolina Sandhills are mapped as the Alpin sand or Candor sand.

== Vegetation ==
Mature longleaf pine forest at Carolina Sandhills National Wildlife Refuge in South Carolina

The Carolina Sandhills region is characterized by xeric sand community vegetation dominated by pine trees, which caused it to formerly be known as Carolina and Georgia's Piney Woods.

Much of the Carolina Sandhills is known for an ecosystem of longleaf pine (Pinus palustris) and wiregrass (Aristida stricta). This ecosystem is maintained by frequent low-intensity fires that facilitate the reproduction of the trees, wiregrass, and associated plants. This ecosystem once formed one of the more extensive ecosystems in North America, and longleaf pine was once the dominant tree that covered ~60% of the Atlantic Coastal Plain and Gulf of Mexico Coastal Plain. Today, however, only about 1% of this region supports longleaf pine.

Research in North Carolina's longleaf pine savannas found that the understory plant diversity differs across sites and isn't only determined by wiregrass dominance. The study in North Carolina Sandhills also found that preserving xerophytic hardwoods results in increasing competition with young longleaf pines that reduces their survival and growth when the fire is absent. Sandhills Game Land research found that adding nitrogen increased the plant biomass while different plant species showed different reactions to nutrients. Restoration sites in North Carolina such as Fort Bragg found that adding seeds helped establish understory plants with a lot of those species, continuing throughout the 8-year study.

== Wildlife ==
More than 30 plant and animal species associated with the longleaf pine ecosystem are listed as threatened or endangered, and many of these species require interactions with the longleaf pine and with frequent low-intensity fires. The most famous endangered species of the Carolina Sandhills is probably the red-cockaded woodpecker (Leuconotopicus borealis), which prefers to excavate nesting and roosting cavities in living trees of longleaf pine that are 80–120 years old.

Another rare species that can be found is the Pine Barrens tree frog, which are tolerant of low pH levels and often lays eggs in shallow, acidic ponds. The species can only be found in the Carolina Sandhills, Southern Alabama/Florida panhandle and the closely related ecosystem New Jersey Pine Barrens. Dryophytes andersonii is also the state amphibian of North Carolina.

== Human history ==
Sand Hills cottage architecture is a style that developed in this area in the early to mid-1800s; it is a modified form of Greek Revival architecture. The people of the 'Piney Woods' that once covered the Sandhills and Inner Banks were known as "Goobers" around the time of the Civil War.

== Preservation ==
The Carolina Sandhills National Wildlife Refuge in northeastern South Carolina attempts to preserve a fraction of the original Sandhills longleaf pine ecosystem. The refuge is located in Chesterfield County near McBee.

In North Carolina, Sandhills Game Land has one of the largest and intact remnants longleaf pine ecosystems in the state that protects longleaf pine habitats and species. Prescribed fire is used on game lands to maintain the understory of longleaf communities and habitat management for species such as the red cockaded woodpecker.
