= Sugarloaf Mountain (South Carolina) =

Hill in Sand Hills State Forest, South Carolina, US

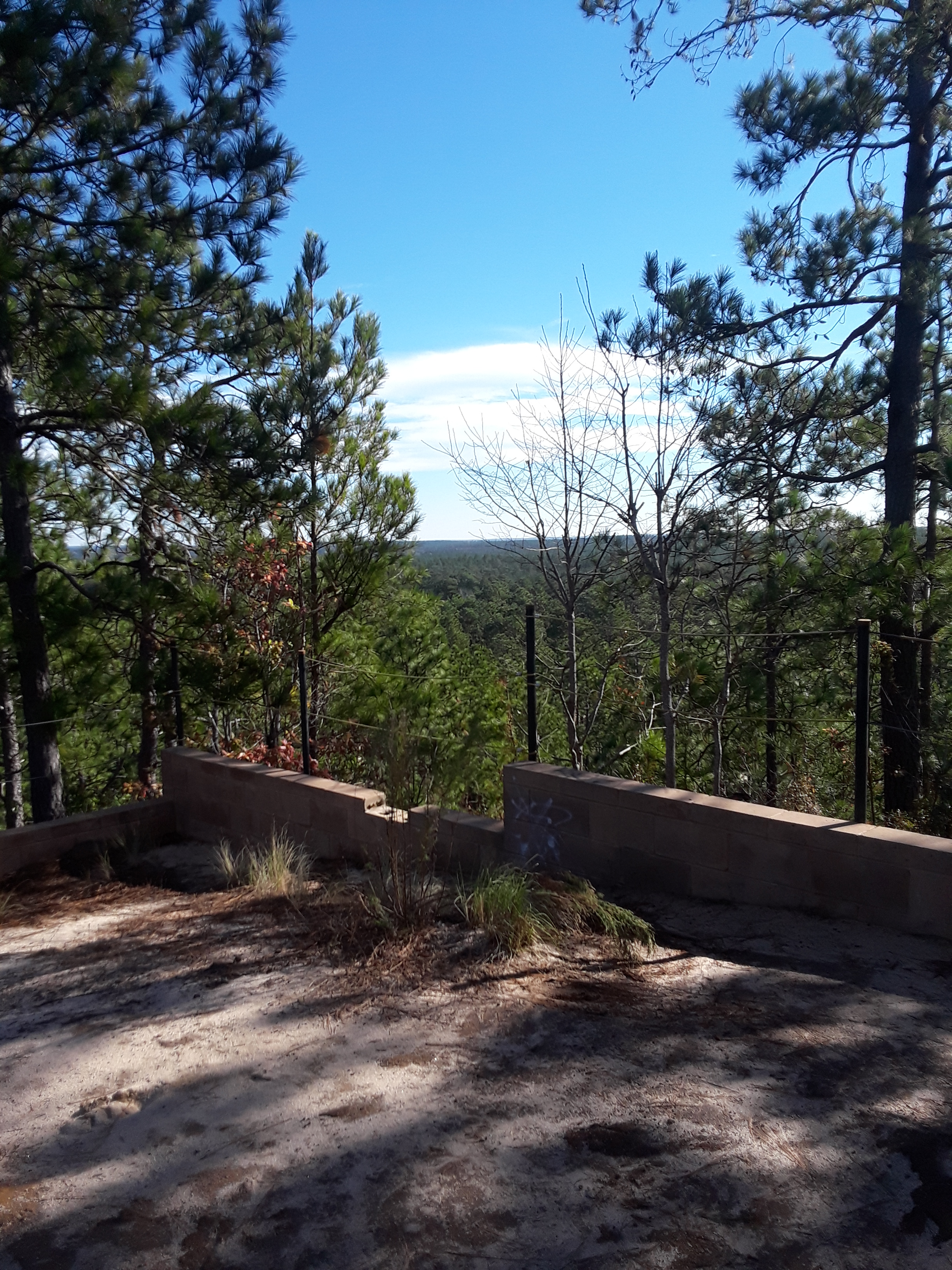
- Sugarloaf Mountain, SC

Highest point
- Elevation: 467.8 feet (142.6 m)
- Prominence: 100+ ft
- Coordinates: 34°35′17″N 080°07′09″W

Geography
- Location within South Carolina
- Location: Chesterfield County, South Carolina
- Parent range: Sandhills (Carolina)

Geology
- Rock age: Late Cretaceous
- Mountain type: Sandstone

Climbing
- Easiest route: Stairway and trail to summit

Sugarloaf Mountain is an unusual hill located in Patrick, South Carolina. Its elevation is 100 feet higher than the surrounding area. This site is located within the Sand Hills State Forest, adjacent to U.S. Highway 1, in the Carolina Sandhills region of the Atlantic Coastal Plain.

== Geology ==
On published geologic maps of the area, Sugarloaf Mountain is mapped as part of the Middendorf Formation, a sequence of sandstone, pebbly sandstone, sand, silt, and clay that are interpreted as fluvial (river) deposits that accumulated during the Cretaceous Period. While much of the mountain is composed of unconsolidated to semi-consolidated beds of quartz-rich sand, silt, and clay, outcrops and boulders of iron-cemented, pebbly sandstone can be found both on the mountain-side and the immediate vicinity. The iron-rich cement holding these sandstones together likely precipitated from groundwater interactions.

== Biology ==
Wildlife is abundant. Flora/fauna include whitetail deer, turkeys, quail, wood ducks, fish, black squirrels and flying squirrels as well as rhododendron, moss, lichen, ferns. Some of these plants are rare for the area. The Red-cockaded woodpecker resides here. You might even see a Pine Barrens tree frog. Hunting is allowed in a few areas as it is treated as a Wildlife Management Area of South Carolina.

There are timber rattlesnakes, black racers, and water moccasins during the spring, summer, and fall.

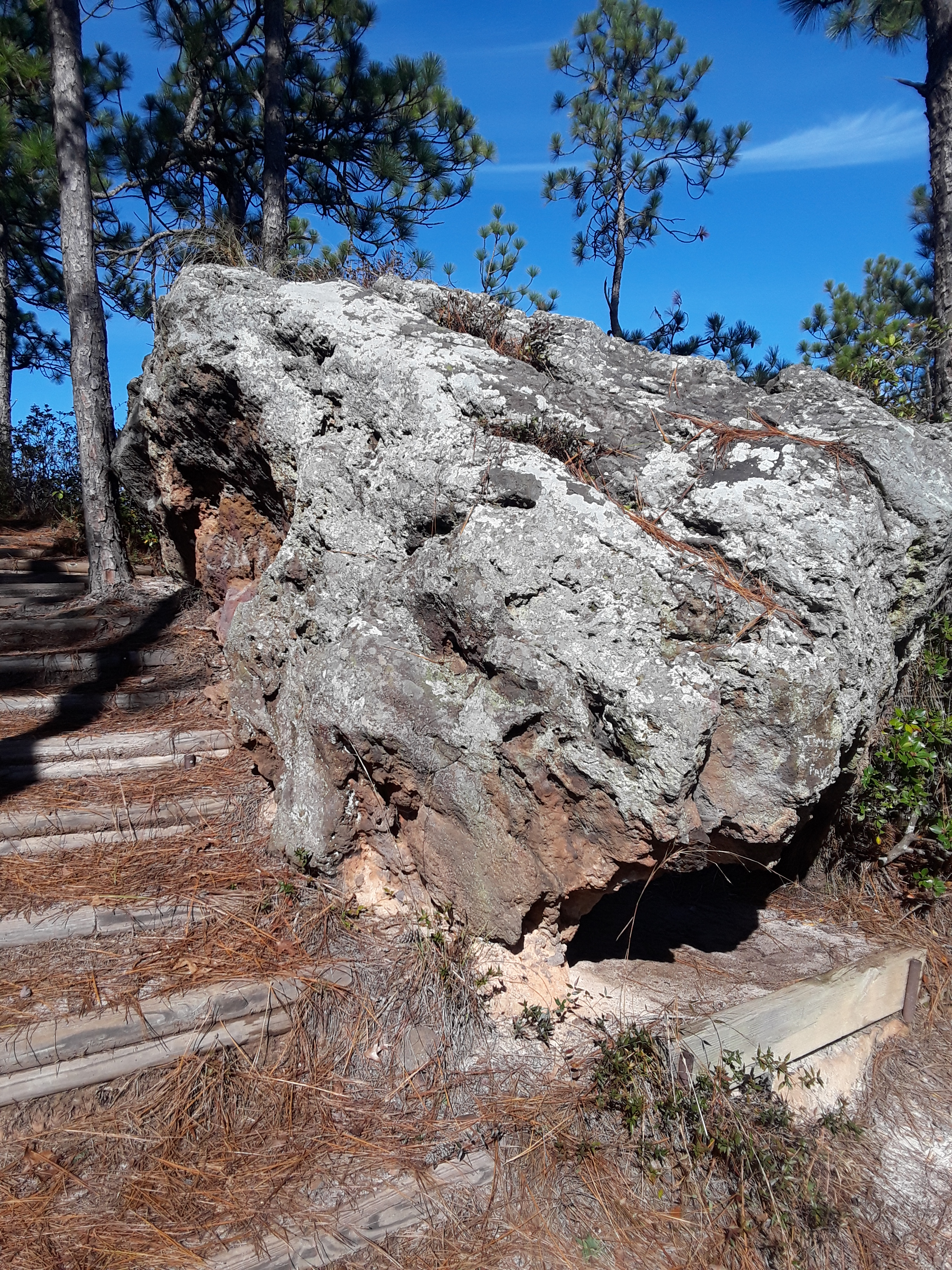
Iron-cemented sandstones of the Middendorf Formation near the base of Sugarloaf Mountain.

== Camping ==
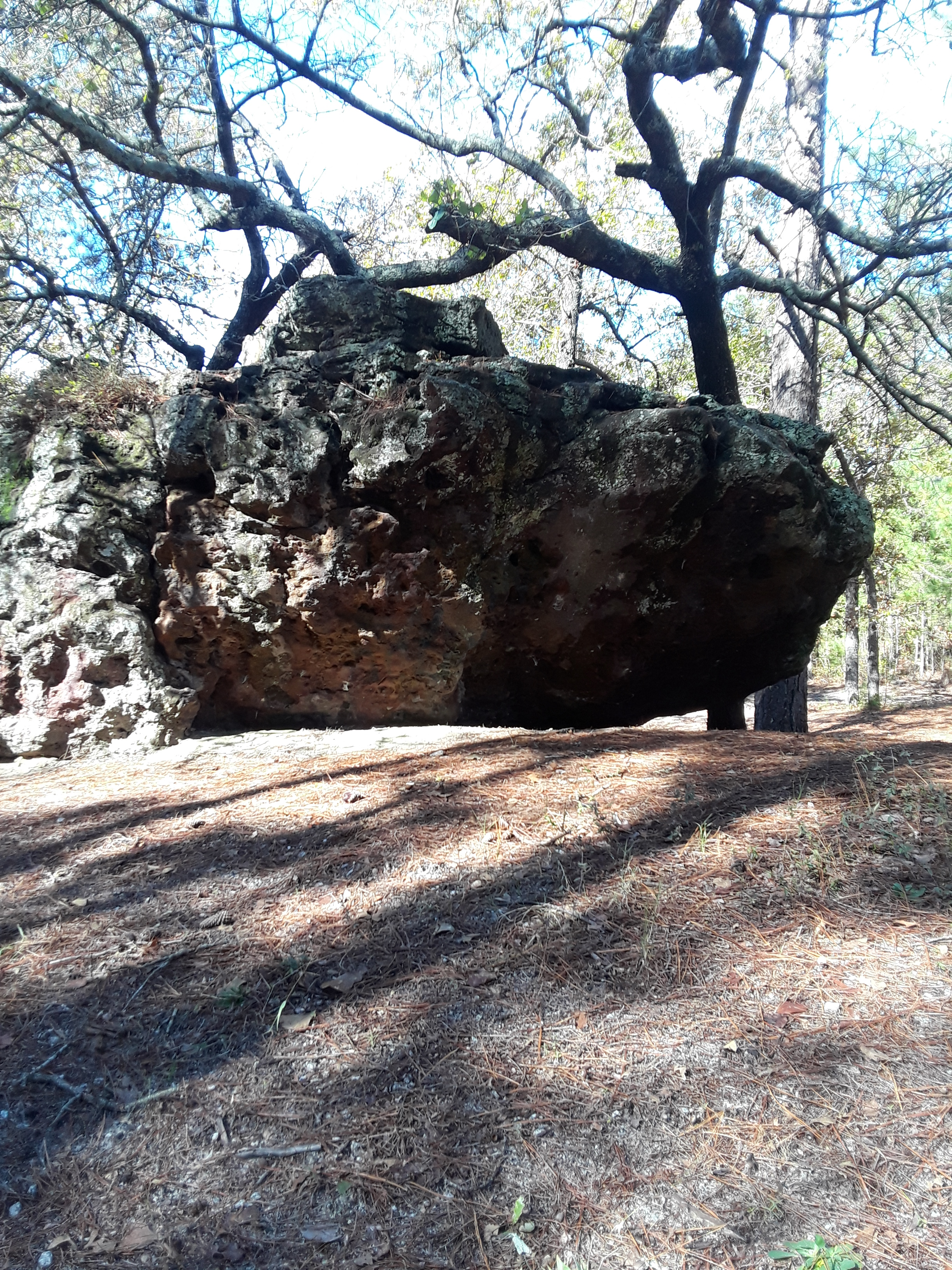
Iron-cemented sandstones.

Overnight camping sights are provided for a fee and with reservation.

== Hiking ==
There are a few marked hiking trails. The woods are open with little underbrush and sand makes for very easy primitive hikes around the mountain. The base of the mountain, can be accessed via a parking lot behind camp site number 6. Directly across from the main "mountain", there is another peak "Little Sugarloaf."

Nature Trail Details
Length: 1.7 miles to about 2.1
Type: Loop
Surface: Natural, Sand
Difficulty: Moderate

Temperatures
Seasons and best times to go
Summer Avg: 92° / 69°
Fall Avg: 85° / 63°
Winter Avg: 59° / 33°
Spring: 76° / 49°

== Horses ==
The Pine Barrens Wagon Trail is in service (though not used often). This trail is unique in that it was devoted to horse drawn wagons and buggies. Occasional creeks along the trails provide water for your horse, but even though there are facilities at the trailheads, due to the length of these trails, you might want to carry water for yourself."

Horses do not have to be shod. During warm months, insect repellent is recommended.

== Fishing ==
Nearby, there is a large pond, (no swimming), that contains fish such as bream, redbreast, and crappie. An occasional small catfish may be caught. No outboards are allowed, but canoes and kayaks are welcome.
