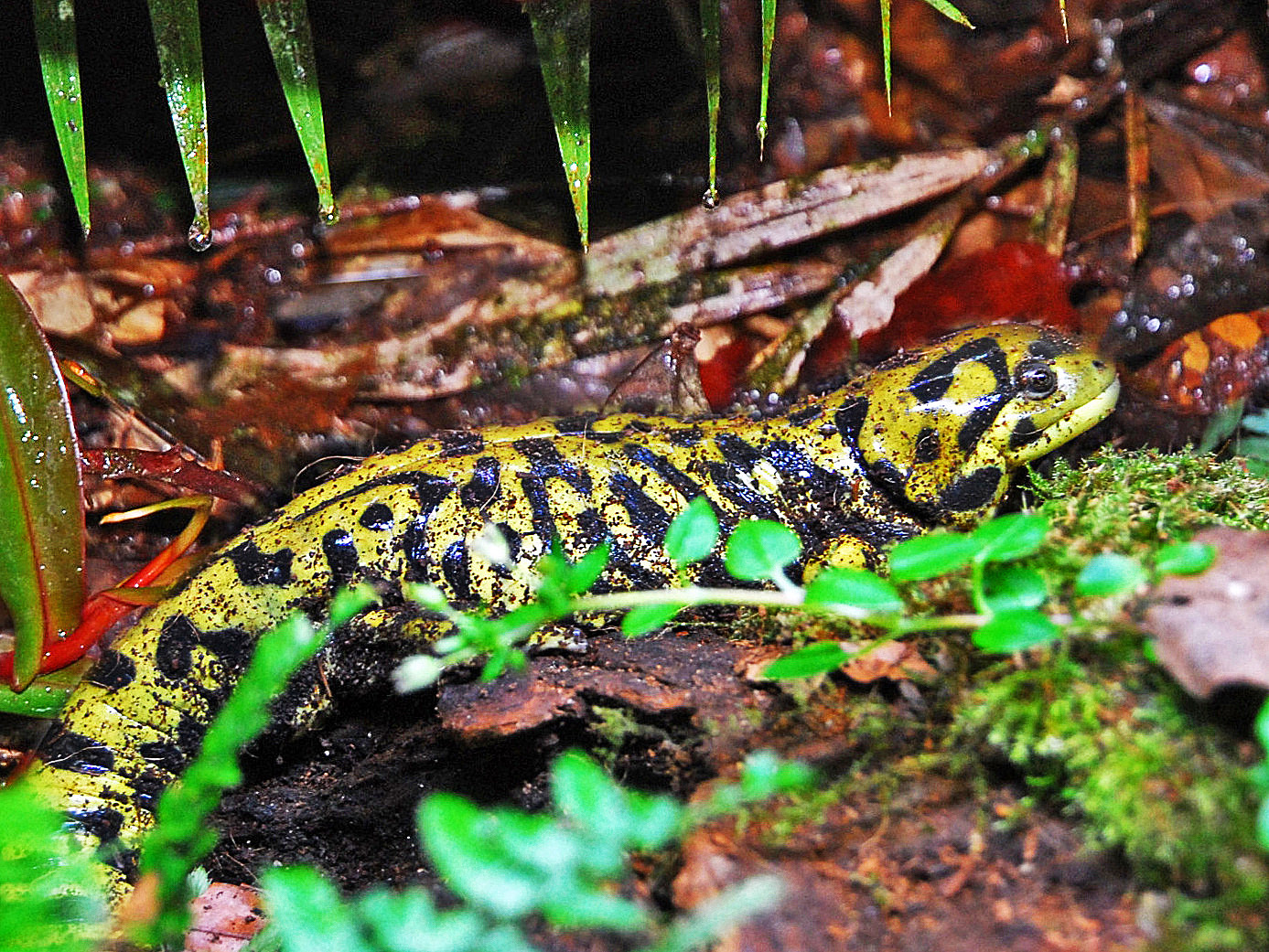

Scientific classification
- Kingdom: Animalia
- Phylum: Chordata
- Class: Amphibia
- Order: Urodela
- Family: Ambystomatidae
- Genus: Ambystoma
- Species: A. mavortium

Binomial name
- Ambystoma mavortium Baird, 1850

= Barred tiger salamander =

Species of amphibian

The barred tiger salamander or western tiger salamander (Ambystoma mavortium) is a species of mole salamander that lives in lower western Canada, the western United States and northern Mexico.

== Description ==
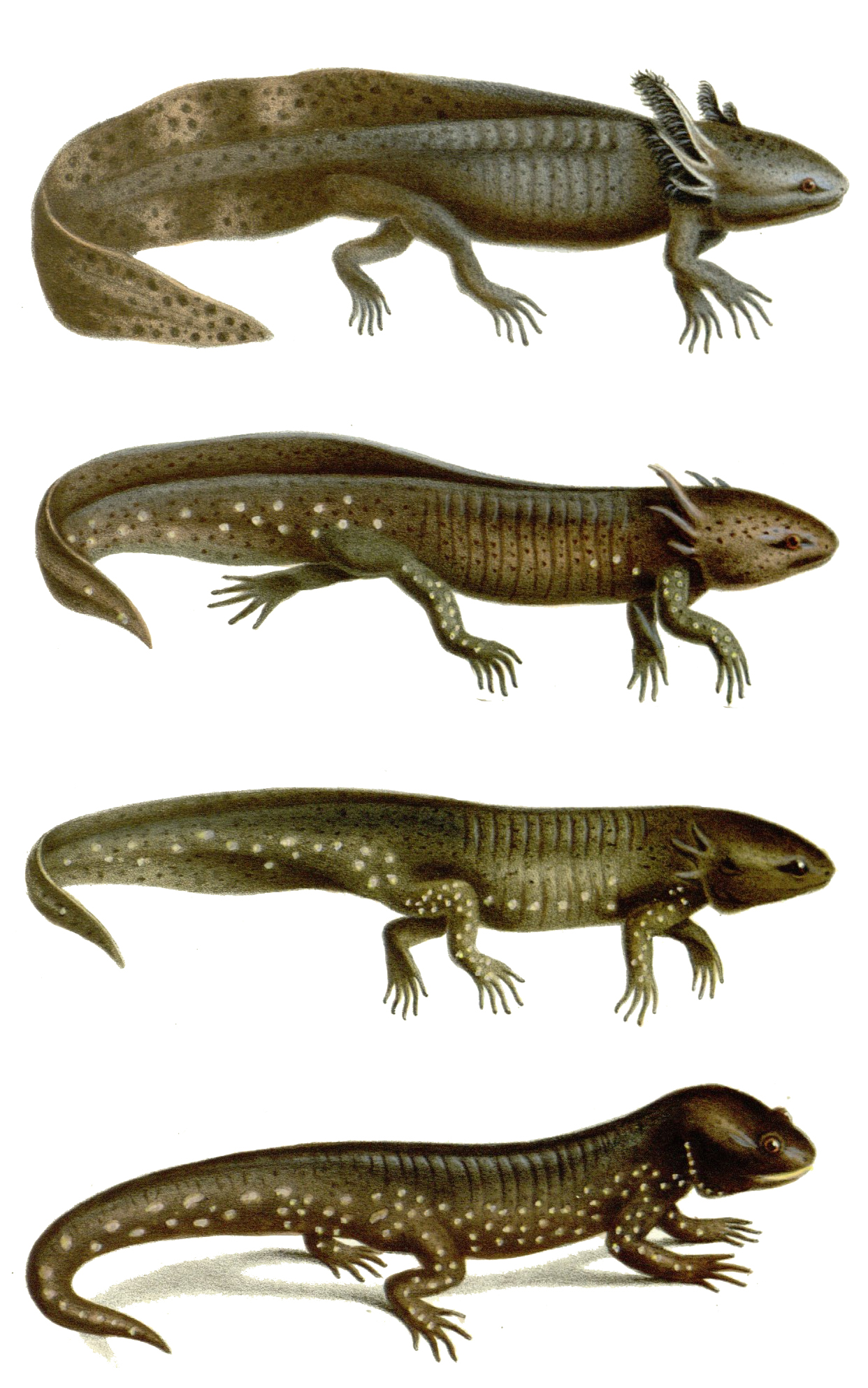
Development

The barred tiger salamander typically grows from 7.6 to 16.5 cm (3.0 to 6.5 in), but neotenic forms can grow to lengths of 17.8 to 38.1 cm (7.0 to 15.0 in). It is one of the largest species of salamander in North America. It has a broad head and a sturdy body, with variable color across its range. The dorsal surface is grey, dark brown or black with bars and spots of muddy yellow giving a tiger-like coloring. The ventral surface varies from light to dark. Larvae have alternating dark and light blotches on the centre of the dorsal surface and pale stripes running along the sides. Kansaspedia states that the tiger salamander has been known to live in captivity for more than 20 years.

== Behavior ==
Primarily nocturnal, barred tiger salamanders are opportunistic feeders, and will often eat anything they can catch, including various insects, slugs, and earthworms. They are primarily terrestrial as adults, but their juvenile, larval stage is entirely aquatic, having external gills. Breeding takes place during most months of the year. The eggs are laid in water and the developing larvae are exclusively aquatic.

=== Cannibalism ===
There are two main feeding morphologies for barred tiger salamanders, typical and cannibalistic. The cannibalistic form is characterized by large vomerine teeth, slim bodies and wider heads. The teeth give a better hold on prey, and the wider heads allow for eating larger organisms, including fathead minnows in some areas. Since the two species have similar diets, eating a competitor also reduces demand on their shared food.

Cannibalistic tiger salamanders tend to metamorphose earlier than the typical ones. Most often, cannibals are found in drier areas and shallow, more competitive waters, making earlier metamorphosis advantageous.

== Subspecies ==
The five recognized subspecies of Ambystoma mavortium are:

- Gray barred tiger salamander, A. m. diaboli (Dunn, 1940)
- Barred tiger salamander, A. m. mavortium (Baird, 1850)
- Blotched tiger salamander, A. m. melanostictum (Baird, 1860)
- Arizona tiger salamander, A. m. nebulosum (Hallowell, 1853)
- Sonoran tiger salamander, A. m. stebbinsi (Lowe, 1954)

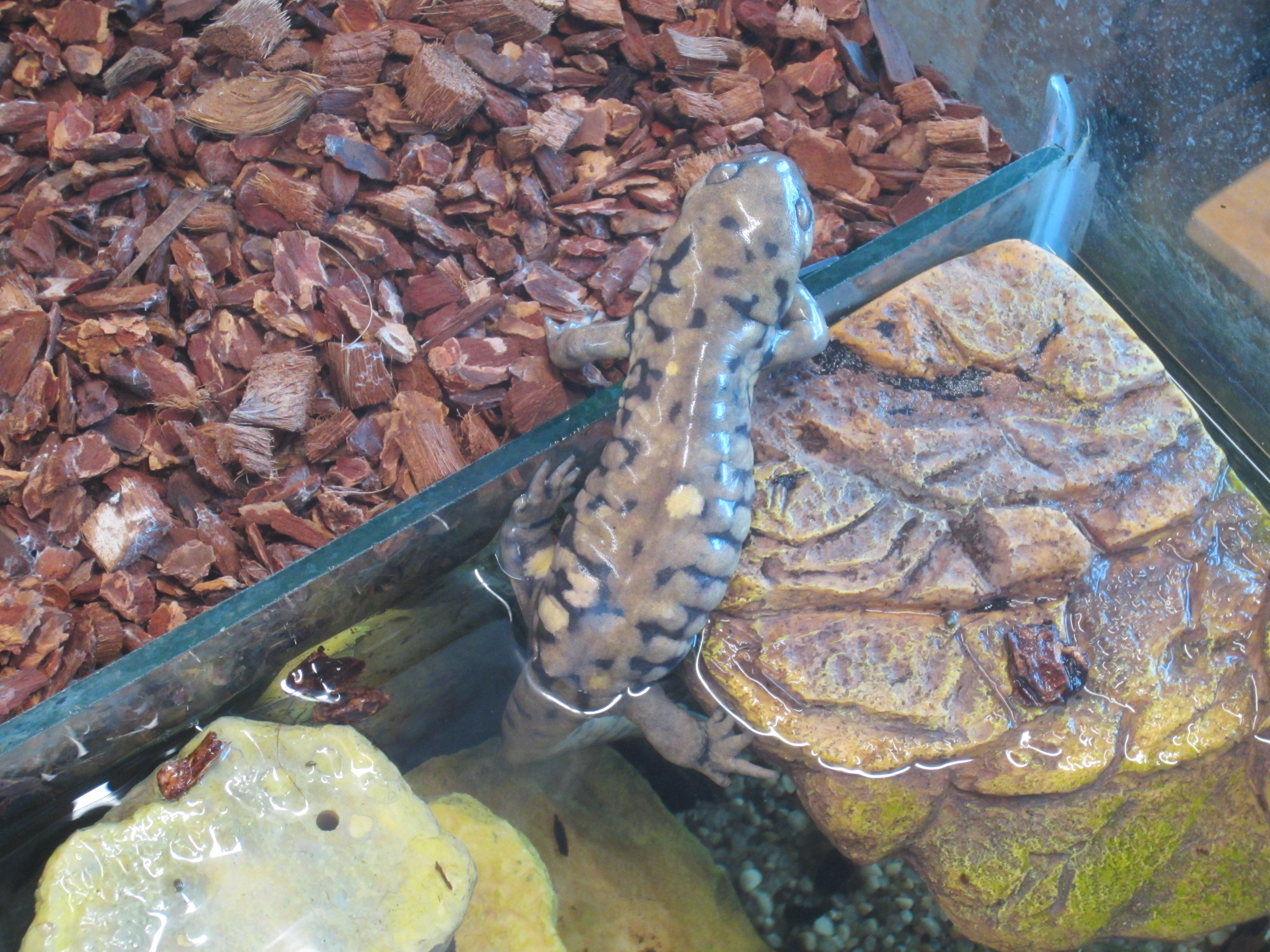
a.m. diaboli, salamander in residence at Living Prairie Museum, Winnipeg

== Distribution and habitat ==
Barred tiger salamanders primarily live in western Canada and the western half of the United States, but can be infrequently found in California and Nevada. In Canada, they can be found in British Columbia, Alberta, Saskatchewan and Manitoba. Its range in the United States extends to the southernmost tip of Texas, but no further east than the Dakotas and Oklahoma. The barred tiger salamander has been introduced into southern Arizona through its larvae, which are used as fish bait.

It is a mainly terrestrial species, living in lowland deciduous forests, coniferous forests and woodlands. It also inhabits open fields, rough ground, upland meadows, grasslands, deserts, semideserts and streams.

== Status ==
The Sonoran tiger salamander was classified as an endangered species in 1997, due to increased human activity causing degradation and fragmentation of its habitat. It is also threatened by various disease outbreaks triggered by species not native to Arizona. Some introduced animals, such as crayfish, prey on it.

== In captivity ==
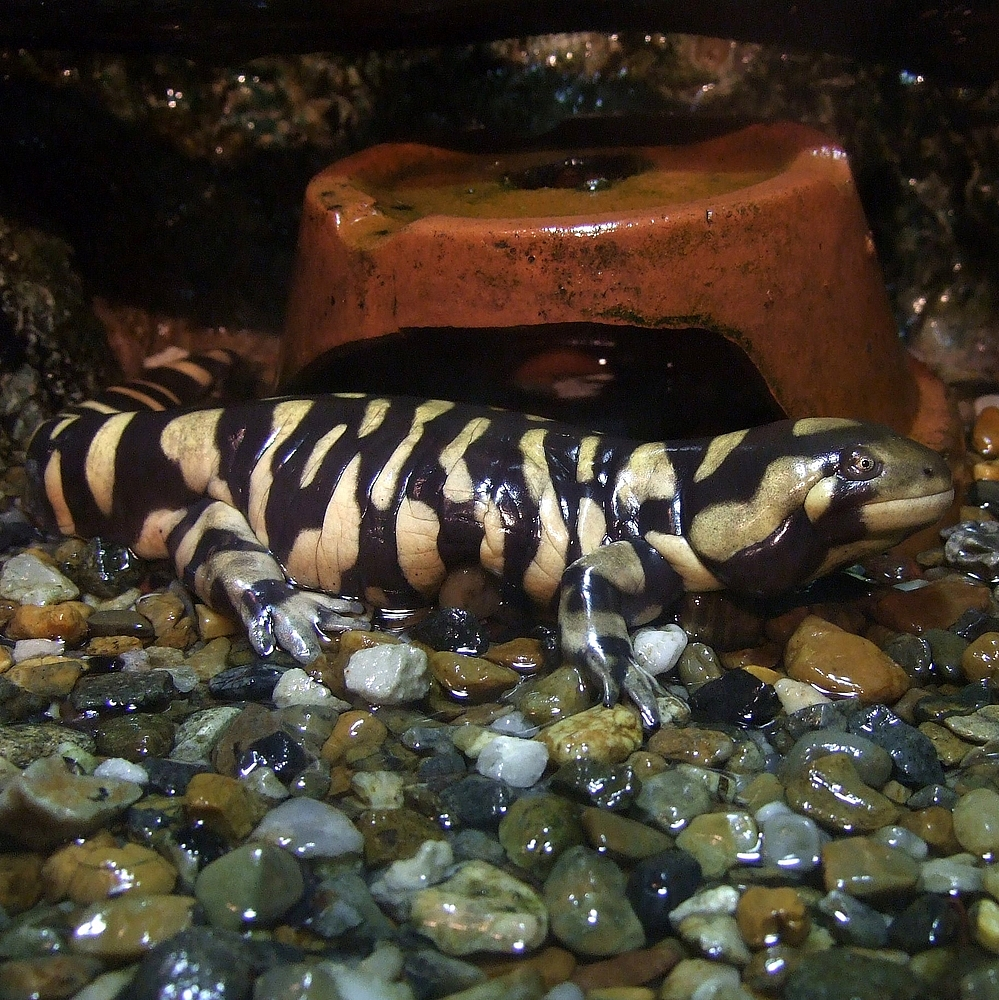
In captivity

Tiger salamanders are frequently kept in captivity; they mostly hide and ambush their prey. It is illegal to sell adults in most parts of the United States. Their large size allows for ease of feeding, and their hardy nature makes them excellent captives. Their larval stage is often sold as fishing bait, marketed as "mud puppies" or "water dogs".

== Symbol ==
The tiger salamander is the state amphibian of Kansas. The second grade class of 1993 of O‑K Elementary in Wichita, Kansas, petitioned the governor; students Timothy Boyd and Kristofer Voorhees presented the initial idea for a state amphibian to their teacher. It is also the state amphibian of Colorado after being recognized by the Colorado legislature on March 16, 2012.

The blotched tiger salamander (Ambystoma mavortium melanostictum) became Wyoming's official state amphibian on February 19, 2019.

== Unused sources ==
- Eden, Christopher J.; et al. (2007). "Accuracy assessment of skeletochronology in the Arizona tiger salamander (Ambystoma tigrinum nebulosum)". Copeia. 2007 (2). Lawrence, KS: The American Society of Ichthyologists and Herpetologists: 471–477. doi:10.1643/0045-8511(2007)7[471:AAOSIT]2.0.CO;2. S2CID 85967439.
- Collins, James P. (1981). "Distribution, habitats, and life history variation in the Tiger salamander, Ambystoma tigrinum, in east-central and southeast Arizona". Copeia. 1981 (3). Lawrence, KS: American Society of Ichthyologists and Herpetologists: 666–675. doi:10.2307/1444572. JSTOR 1444572.
