= Sugarloaf Mountain (Butte County, California) =

Name of two summits in Butte County, California, United States

Sugarloaf is in the name of two different mountains that are located in Butte County of northern California.

== Butte County mountains ==
- Sugarloaf Peak — a hill rising to about 550 feet (170 m) above sea level, at 39°31′50″N 121°36′59″W.

Located in the eastern Sacramento Valley, above the northern shore of the Thermalito Forebay (Feather River project), and northwest of Oroville.

- Sugarloaf or Sugar Loaf — a granitic mountain rising to about 1,600 feet (490 m) above sea level, at 39°38′14″N 121°32′19″W.

Located ~ 15 miles (24 km) northeast of Sugarloaf Peak, in the Sierra Nevada foothills near Cherokee west of Lake Oroville, and north of Oroville.

== See also ==
- Geography of the Sacramento Valley
- Mountains of the Sierra Nevada (United States)
- Sugarloaf (mountain)
