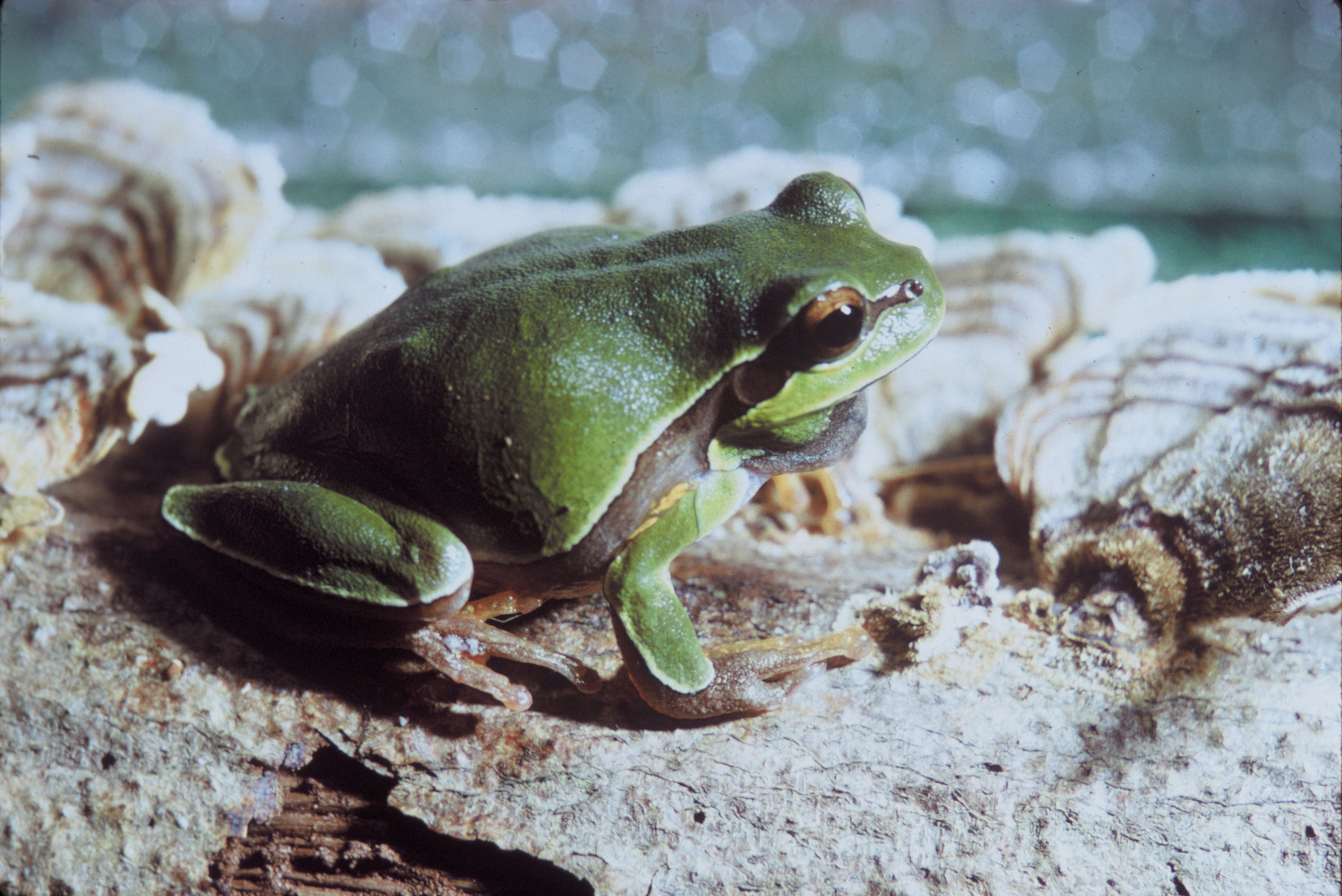

Conservation status
- Least Concern (IUCN 3.1)

- Apparently Secure (NatureServe)

Scientific classification
- Kingdom: Animalia
- Phylum: Chordata
- Class: Amphibia
- Order: Anura
- Family: Hylidae
- Genus: Dryophytes
- Species: D. andersonii

Binomial name
- Dryophytes andersonii (Baird, 1854)

Synonyms
- Hyla andersonii Baird, 1854

= Pine Barrens tree frog =

Species of amphibian

The Pine Barrens tree frog (Dryophytes andersonii) is a species of New World tree frog. It is becoming rare due to habitat loss. Habitat loss is a concern because this species depends on specialized wetlands and shallow, acidic ponds to survive and reproduce.

== Description ==
Dryophytes andersonii is about 2.8–4.3 centimetres (1.1–1.7 in) long, snout-to-vent, as an adult. Members of the species are predominantly emerald green. The green coloration is bordered by a white stripe, which separates it from a later plum band that extends downwards to cover the belly. The hidden surfaces of their legs are orange to yellow. The belly is covered in white areolae. The toes are partially webbed, while the fingers are free. The pads of both fingers and toes are small.

The key to distinguishing the Pine Barrens tree frog from the similar-appearing American green tree frog (D. cinerea) is the white-bordered lavender stripe on each side of the body in the Pine Barrens tree frog. D. cinerea has only a white stripe in this location.

== Habitat ==
Dryophytes andersonii are primarily found near temporary still or slow waters dominated by shrubs or herbaceous plants. Permanent bodies of water that are home to fish contain fewer and more isolated frogs. Their preferred natural habitats include wet areas in pitch pine forests, intermittent streams and ponds, stream backwaters, Sphagnum bogs, and Atlantic white cedar swamps. They are also found alongside artificial bodies of water such as cranberry bogs, water-filled ruts created by vehicles, flooded borrow pits, and ditches. Adults are primarily found in waterside vegetation, but may be encountered on the ground.

== Breeding ==
D. andersonii prefer to reproduce in isolated, shallow, and acidic ponds. The ideal pH level for D. andersonii eggs is between 3.74 and 4.69. The eggs are laid in May and June; the tadpoles metamorphose into adults in July and August. Eggs are laid singly, and are approximately 1.2–1.4 millimetres (0.047–0.055 in) in diameter.

Calling begins at the end of April and can continue into August. Adults remain within 70 metres (230 ft) of their breeding sites throughout the breeding season, although individuals have been documented as far as 100 metres (330 ft). Towards the end of the season, they disperse father away from their breeding sites. The species' comparatively late breeding season, combined with its preference for temporary water sources, makes it vulnerable to droughts and changes in water levels.

== Distribution ==
Geographical distribution of Dryophytes andersonii

Dryophytes andersonii primarily inhabits the Atlantic Coastal Plain. Due to the limited extent of suitable habitats, the species is currently distributed in three disjunct areas in the southeastern United States: the New Jersey Pine Barrens; the Sandhills of North and South Carolina; and the Florida panhandle and southern Alabama. The New Jersey populations are the largest currently recorded. Although one specimen of D. andersonii is known from Richmond County, Georgia, a population is not known to currently exist there.

Dryophytes andersonii is the state frog of North Carolina. It was selected through a poll organized by the North Carolina Herpetological Society, in which the Pine Barrens tree frog was chosen alongside the marbled salamander.

== Conservation status ==
The Floridian population of Dryophytes andersonii was listed as endangered by the US Fish and Wildlife Service between 1977 and 1983, when additional populations were found in Florida. The IUCN classified the species overall as Near Threatened in 2004 and 2017, downlisting it to Least Concern in 2023.

Pine Barrens tree frogs are rarely encountered in sites where nonnative amphibians, such as bullfrogs, and nonnative fish are present, suggesting that they are poor competitors. As a consequence of this, D. andersonii populations found in or near developed and agricultural areas are believed to be the most at risk due to the greater presence of nonnative species there.

The Pine Barrens tree frog is currently listed as Threatened in the state of New Jersey.

Overall, habitat loss is the key challenge in conservation efforts. Temporal analyses of total wetland habitat from 2001 to 2016 offer quantitative evidence for this claim (with some difference by wetland type). For instance, woody wetlands have increased in New Jersey and Florida within the Pine Barrens Treefrog's range, while they have declined in North Carolina and South Carolina.

== In popular culture ==
The Pine Barrens tree frog was featured in a series of prints by artist Andy Warhol. In 1983, the artist was commissioned to create a portfolio of ten endangered species to raise environmental awareness and included was D. andersonii. The portfolio, known as "Endangered Species" was created in support of the Endangered Species Act, which was passed by the U.S. Congress in 1973. Other animals within the portfolio include the Siberian Tiger, Bald Eagle and the Giant Panda.
