= Sugarloaf Mountain (Riverside County, California) =

Mountain in Riverside County, California, United States

- Location within California

Highest point
- Elevation: 1,947 ft (593 m) NAVD 88
- Coordinates: 33°59′38″N 117°19′21″W

Geography
- Location: Riverside County, California, U.S.
- Parent range: Box Springs Mountains
- Topo map: USGS Riverside East

Sugarloaf Mountain is in Riverside County, California, United States, near milepost 82 on Pines to Palms Scenic Byway (SR 74). This mountain was officially named by the USGS and appears on their topographic maps. The summit elevation is approximately 1,947 feet (593 m).
