= List of U.S. state amphibians =

This is a list of official U.S. state, federal district, and territory amphibians. State amphibians are designated by tradition or the respective state legislatures.

As of 2023, only 28 states and one territory have a state amphibian.

== Table ==
State	Common name	Scientific name	Photo	Year
Alabama	Red Hills salamander	Phaeognathus hubrichti		2000
Arizona	Arizona tree frog	Hyla eximia		1986
California	California red-legged frog	Rana draytonii		2014
Colorado	Western tiger salamander	Ambystoma mavortium		2012
Georgia	American green tree frog	Hyla cinerea		2005
Idaho	Idaho giant salamander	Dicamptodon aterrimus	A neotenic adult Idaho giant salamander	2015
Illinois	Eastern tiger salamander	Ambystoma tigrinum		2005
Iowa	American bullfrog	Rana catesbeiana		Unofficial
Kansas	Barred tiger salamander	Ambystoma mavortium		2005
Louisiana	American green tree frog	Hyla cinerea		1993
Maine	Spring peeper	Pseudacris crucifer	A spring peeper on a tree making its distinctive "peep" call	2025
Minnesota	Northern leopard frog	Rana pipiens		Proposed in 1999
Missouri	American bullfrog	Rana catesbeiana		2005
New Hampshire	Red-spotted newt	Notophthalmus viridescens		1985
New Jersey	Pine Barrens tree frog	Dryophytes andersonii		2018
New Mexico	New Mexico spadefoot toad	Spea multiplicata		2003
New York	Wood frog	Lithobates sylvaticus		Proposed in 2015
North Carolina	Pine barrens tree frog (state frog)	Hyla andersonii		2013
North Carolina	Marbled salamander (state salamander)	Ambystoma opacum		2013
Ohio	Spotted salamander (state amphibian)	Ambystoma maculatum		2010
Ohio	American bullfrog (state frog)	Rana catesbeiana		2010
Oklahoma	American bullfrog	Rana catesbeiana		1997
Pennsylvania	Eastern hellbender	Cryptobranchus alleganiensis		2019
South Carolina	Spotted salamander	Ambystoma maculatum		1999
Tennessee	Tennessee cave salamander	Gyrinophilus palleucus		1995
Texas	Texas toad	Bufo speciosus		2009
Vermont	Northern leopard frog	Rana pipiens		1998
Virginia	Red salamander	Pseudotriton ruber		2018
Washington	Pacific tree frog	Pseudacris regilla		2007
West Virginia	Red salamander	Pseudotriton ruber		2015
Wyoming	Blotched tiger salamander	Ambystoma mavortium melanostictum		2019

Federal district or territory	Common name	Scientific name	Image	Year
Puerto Rico	Common coquí	Eleutherodactylus coqui		Unofficial

== See also ==
- Lists of U.S. state insignia
