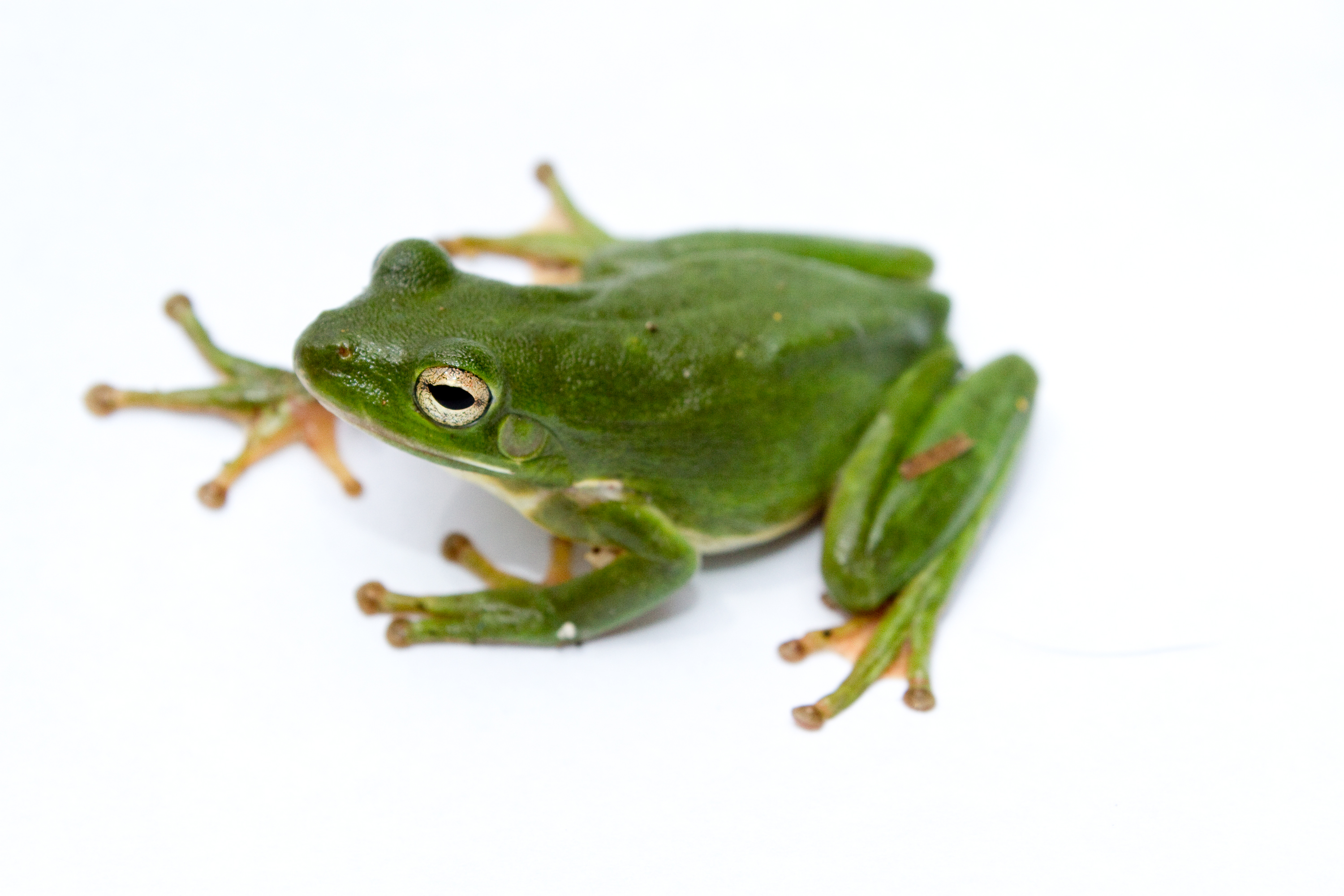

Conservation status
- Least Concern (IUCN 3.1)

Scientific classification
- Kingdom: Animalia
- Phylum: Chordata
- Class: Amphibia
- Order: Anura
- Family: Hylidae
- Genus: Dryophytes
- Species: D. cinereus

Binomial name
- Dryophytes cinereus (Schneider, 1799)
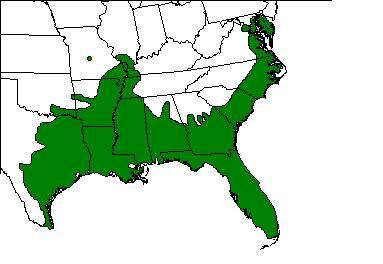
- Approximate range

Synonyms
- Calamita cinereus Schneider, 1799; Hyla viridis Holbrook, 1842; Hyla carolinensis Cope, 1889; Hyla cinerea Garman, 1890

= American green tree frog =

Species of amphibian

The American green tree frog (Dryophytes cinereus or Hyla cinerea) is a common arboreal species of New World tree frog belonging to the family Hylidae. This nocturnal insectivore is moderately sized and has a bright green to reddish-brown coloration. Sometimes, light yellowish spots are present on the dorsum. Commonly found in the central and southeastern United States, the frog lives in open canopy forests with permanent water sources and abundant vegetation. The American green tree frog is strictly aquatic during the hibernating and mating seasons. When defending its territory, the frog either emits aggressive call signals or resolves to grapple with intruders, seldom leading to injury or death. To avoid predation, the frog will leap into the water or jump into the treetops.

Female green tree frogs are larger than males. Body size is often a critical determinant of competitive ability and reproductive behavior. Pairs breed through amplexus. Males emit low frequency advertisement calls to attract females. During mating competition, males will eavesdrop on neighboring rivals and either adjust their signal timing or remain silent to intercept call signals and mate with approaching females. Androgens energize males to vocalize.

== Description ==
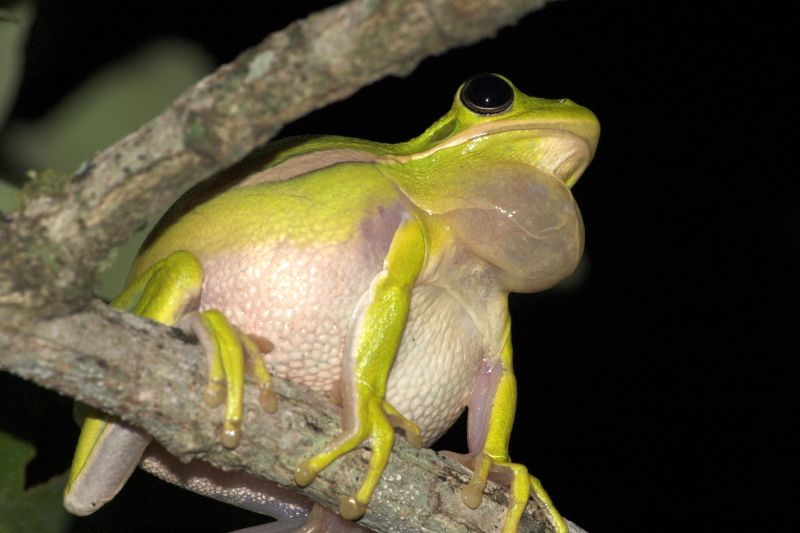
With distended vocal sac

The American green tree frog is moderately sized. It has long legs, a streamlined and slender build, and smooth skin. It has large, protruding eyes with horizontal pupils. The American green tree frog ranges from 3.2 to 6.4 centimetres (1 1/4 to 2 1/2 in) in length. For perspective on the growth of juveniles, recently metamorphosed "young-of-the-year" were found to be about 20.6 mm. Once grown, individuals reach sexual maturity within a year.

Their dorsum can range in color from the more common bright green to reddish-brown. Their moist skin is ventrally smooth and dorsally granular. Such a range in coloration may result in the frog being mistaken for other species. Some evidence suggests that green tree frogs can exhibit a color change in response to their background and/or temperature.

The dorsum is peppered with small golden spots, and the frogs have a white to cream coloration on their ventral side. American green tree frogs also contain white prominent lateral stripes.

They are normally ectothermic and heterothermic.

The American green tree frog weighs on average 3.76g with a range between 2.15g and 5.11g. Female frogs are usually larger than males. Larger males tend to have an upper hand in attracting females than smaller males either through increased physical strength in duels or more pronounced call signals during mating competition.

== Distribution and habitat ==
The American green tree frog is found in the central and southeastern United States with a geographic range from the Eastern Shore of Maryland to southeast Florida with populations as far west as central Texas and as far north as Delaware and southern New Jersey, though the size of its distribution may be larger or vary seasonally. They are indigenous to the coastal plains of North Carolina, South Carolina, Georgia, and all of Florida. The American green tree frog is considered monotypic, but clinal variation has been observed from Florida north along the Atlantic coastal plain. This may be attributed to the result of strong selection and/or drift.

American green tree frogs prefer to live in small, early successional canopy gaps in forests with a permanent water source and filled with plentiful vegetation and bottom-landed forested area. The species is found in both natural and settled environments, often being sighted in backyards with ponds, in garages or garden structures. The species commonly resides in cypress ponds, water lily prairies, and marshes. They are often found perched on twigs, low branches, and grasses.

== Conservation ==
A growing number of American green tree frogs have experienced severe habitat loss primarily due to urbanization and destructive wildfires that can destroy forest canopy cover. Since most amphibians have narrow habitat tolerances and migration constraints, American green tree frogs urgently need alternative shelters for survival as forest canopies recover. In a study from Central Texas, scientists have tried to combat wildfire habitat loss by creating artificial shelters using PVC pipes.Wetlands that the American green tree frogs occupy for breeding have had an increase in salinity and an increase in pesticide concentration in recent years due to urbanization. This has proven to have a negative effect on sperm mobility and has reduced reproductive success

== Population structure, speciation, and phylogeny ==
One study finds that there are at least 31 tree frog species of the genus Hyla (or Dryophytes) in North America, Central America, and Eurasia. Examples include both the H. gratiosa and H. walkeri. While many tree frogs reside in the New World, a notable number of frogs inhabit the Eurasian continent and display unique biogeographic patterns based on an analysis of nuclear and mitochondrial DNA sequences.

== Home range and territoriality ==
American green tree frogs are relatively sedentary overall and stay within a localized home range. In wetter regions, they will venture to nearby woodlands, but in dry conditions they must stay close to a water source. They will defend their mate calling sites against foreign rivals and invaders using aggressive interactions. Such behaviors include a combination of aggressive call signals and wrestling from males.

== Diet ==
American green tree frogs are insectivores, primarily consuming flies, mosquitoes, grasshoppers, cockroaches, spiders, beetles, and other small insects such as crickets and ants. One study suggested frogs select prey not by their size, but according to their activity levels, with the most active prey being the most frequently eaten. The same study showed "nearly 90% of Hyla cinerea prey were actively pursued", with the other 10% being "insects walking or close enough to be snatched up by the frog's tongue". Another study showed that it is not uncommon for American green tree frogs to ingest plant material. Ambush-style foraging is most common, with prey mostly taken at night.

== Behavior ==
Male Dryophytes cinereus calling

Because the species is small and easily frightened, they often do not do well with frequent handling. Some specimens do seem to tolerate it occasionally, so handling frequency should be determined on an individual basis. The American green tree frog tends to be nocturnal, so they will be most active once the lights are off. They are arboreal (tree-dwelling) and will commonly be found clinging to vertical surfaces using their toe pads. Males call most of the year, especially after being misted in their tank. Large choruses can be loud and heard up to 1-2 kilometers away.

=== Breeding ===
Pair breeding

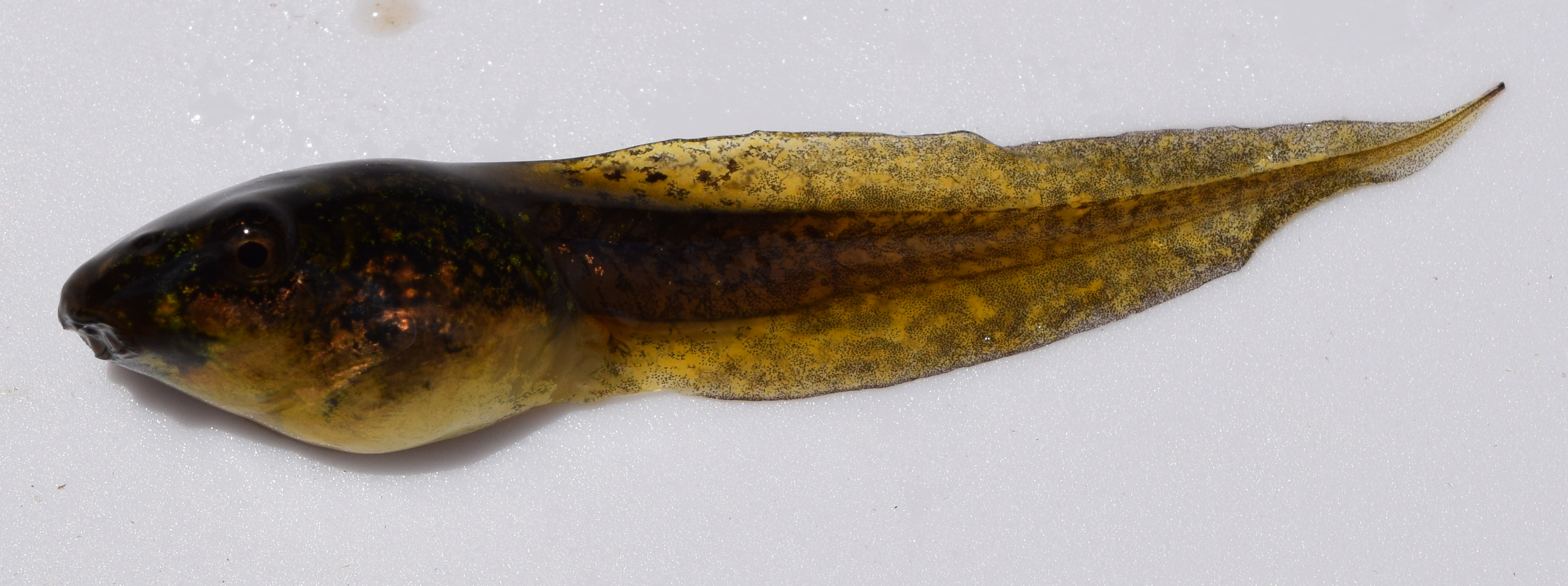
Tadpole

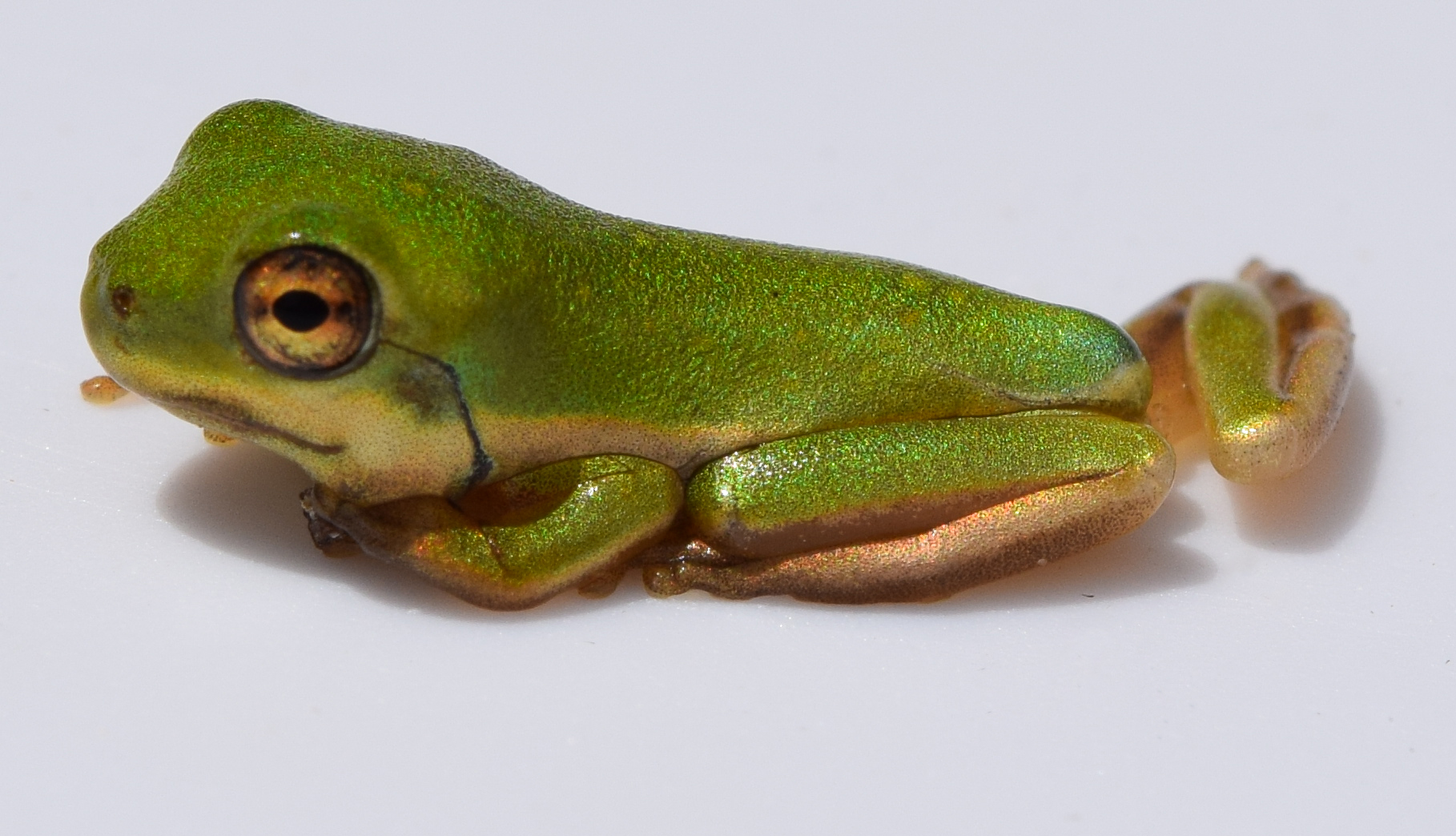
Metamorph

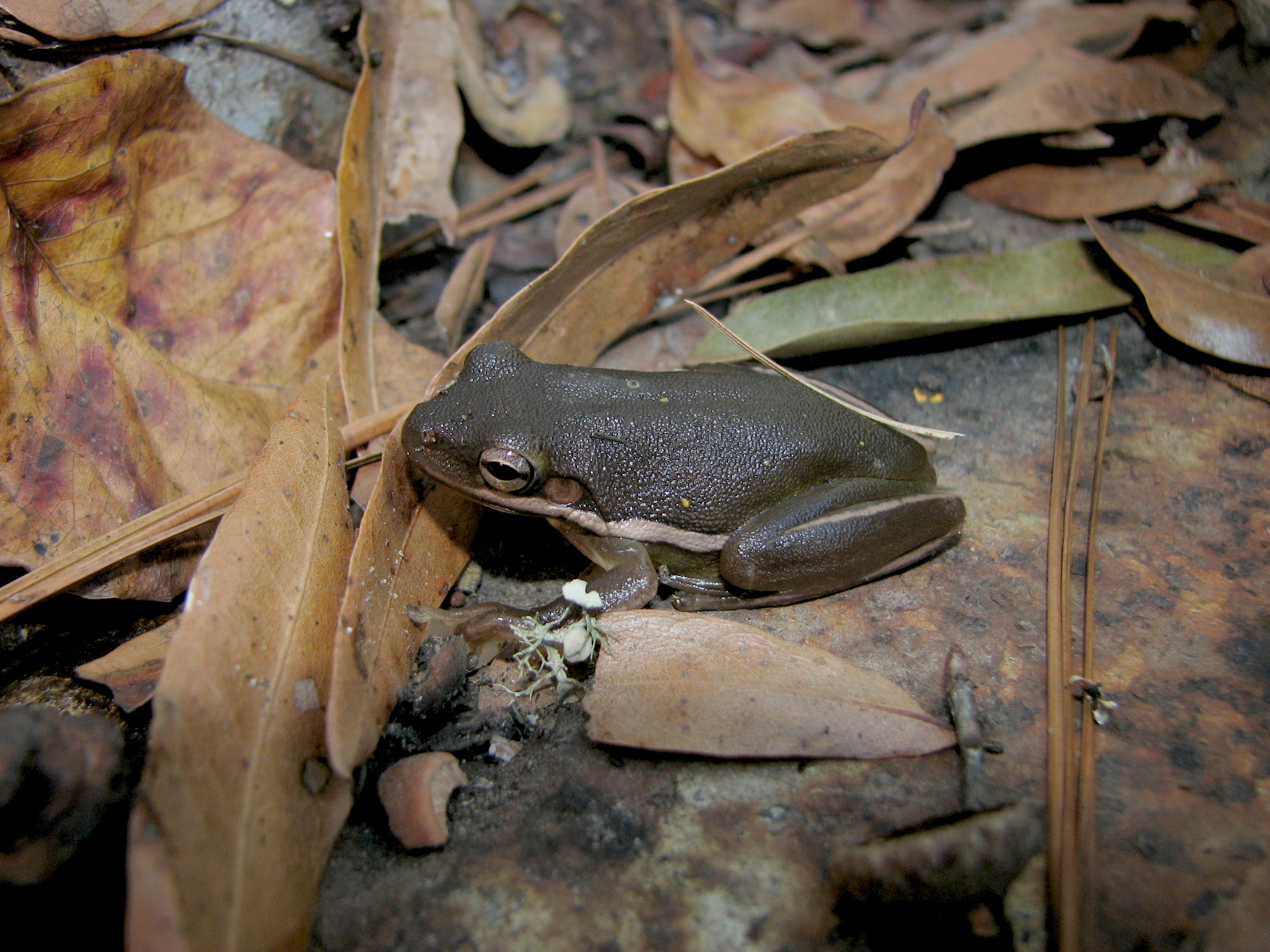
American green tree frogs vary in color.

Most American green tree frog females breed once per year, but some have multiple clutches in a single mating season. In a Florida population, "advertisement calls of males were documented between March and September and pairs in amplexus were observed between April and August". The average number of eggs in a single clutch was observed to be about 400 for this specific population. In a population in Florida where conditions were better, clutch size averaged over 1,200. Eggs take between 4 and 14 days to hatch, with an average of five days. According to the Animal Diversity Web at the University of Michigan Museum of Zoology, "Female size was positively correlated with clutch size, but after the initial clutch, the number of eggs nearly always decreased".

Tadpoles are green with a yellow or white stripe extending from each nostril to the eye and may have mottled tail fins. American green tree frogs show only the parental investment of mating and egg-laying.

Breeding is known to be strongly influenced by day length, temperature, and precipitation. While the influence of these factors with respect to breeding is not well understood, it is well documented, as the frogs generally breed following rainfall and males call more frequently as temperature and day length increase. The green tree frog is the only species in the hyla genus in the southeastern U.S. that commonly breeds around predatory fish habitats. Some evidence demonstrates that the length of the breeding season is correlated with latitude; seasonal length decreases as latitude increases due to temperature limitations.

=== Mating calls ===
To attract mates, the male American green tree frog uses a distinctive advertisement call which is noticeably different from its release or warning calls. This is important for reproductive isolation in areas where different species share breeding areas. Once a mate has been attracted, the pair begins amplexus in which the male frog grasps onto the female to initiate fertilization. The species is polygynous, with the male generally seeking to mate with as many females as it can attract. Eggs are attached to substrates such as emergent vegetation, and unlike other frog species, these egg masses are typically laid in permanent bodies of water rather than vernal pools.

When male frogs aggregate, choruses will form and establish a cacophony of numerous unique advertisement calls. Consequently, male individuals experience intraspecific mating competition and often encounter immense pressure to produce unique call signals that are both attractive and audible to the limited number of available females. Such challenges are further complicated by the rapid fluctuation of males within a chorus, the potential risk of increased exposure to predators, and sexual selection of specific call signals through female choice.

These factors give rise to a social plasticity in the calling behavior of the American green tree frog. In order to maintain competition, male individuals will either modify their signal features, such as the temporal and spectral properties of calls or their signal timing, to reduce signal interference with other neighboring males. Temporal and spectral properties include call duration and call frequency. Changes in signal timing include initiation of advertisement calls during different times of the night. Calls of tree frogs are heavily mediated by dopamine receptors, there is no clear impact of what increased dopamine does to the frog's calls. It has been found that male green tree frogs will more often alter their signal timing to attract females due to physiological constraints in the frog's call production mechanism and female choice against increased call duration and period in favor of precise call timing. Modifying signal behavior towards every frog within a chorus is extremely costly and inefficient. However, forcing male individuals to engage in selective attention of advertisement calls from only a few of their closest rivals.

==== Satellite males ====
Some male American green tree frogs will not emit or alter their advertisement calls and instead choose to remain silent. Labeled as 'satellites', these frogs will wait to intercept the signals of nearby calling males and mate with approaching sexually active females through amplexus. Such sexual parasitism and call avoidance occur mainly to conserve the frog's energy and avoid predation during mate competition.

Androgens are used for energy during call signal production. As a satellite male green tree frog engages in non-calling mating behavior, androgen quantities are found to decrease to lower levels compared to calling behavior, suggesting a causal relationship between sex hormones and mate calling tactics.

In order to help decide whether to engage in satellite non-calling behavior, male green tree frogs will eavesdrop on other nearby male competitors and adjust their mating responses based on the qualities of their call signals. If given with the choice, females prefer large males with advertisement calls of lower frequencies. Other notable features include the latency to call and male focal size. When eavesdropping male competitors with low call frequencies, large male green tree frogs are found to reduce their latency to call and raise call rates. Small males in contrast will only reduce their latency to call in response to competitors with average call frequencies.

==== Interspecific competition ====
American green tree frogs are also able to undergo interspecific mating competition. In southern Florida, the Cuban tree frog (Osteopilus septentrionalis) is an invasive species that has a similar call to the American green tree frog with respect to timing and pitch. A study found that their calls compete acoustically with each other due to their similarity which limits communication space. In order to compete with the Cuban tree frog, American green tree frogs modified their calls to be shorter, louder, and more frequent so that potential mates would have a better chance of detecting the call.

== Threats ==
As a tadpole, the American green tree frog is easily predated by sunfish, bass, and dragonflies, including both aeshnidae and libellulidae odonate naiads. The species is especially vulnerable to predation when living in temporary ponds compared to permanent waters. To combat predation, green tree frog tadpoles may increase hiding behavior while in water to avoid capture.

As an adult, the American green tree frog is predated by snakes, birds, or even other frogs.

The American green tree frog is also prone to a few parasites, including nematodes, protozoans, and trematodes.

Contrary to most amphibians, the American green tree frog is not easily susceptible to the Batrachochytrium dendrobatidis (Bd) pathogen and the disease chytridiomycosis. Reasons explaining why are relatively unknown, but one study hypothesizes that variances in climate, frog immunity, and frog habitat are potential factors.

== Physiology ==
=== Androgens ===
When a male frog engages in vocalization either for aggression or mate attraction, androgen energy stores are used and become depleted. Interestingly, glucocorticoids, such as corticosterones, also appear to change during calling behavior. According to the Energetics-Hormone Vocalization model, glucocorticoid levels in males will rise as androgen levels decrease following vocalization. When observing hormonal levels in both calling and satellite non-calling males, reduced androgen levels and elevated glucocorticoid levels are found among satellite non-calling males compared to calling males. These observations suggest a possible mechanism dictating vocalization and the alternation between calling and non-calling behavior in the green tree frog. Further study is required however on the relationship between glucocorticoids and male vocalization to consider causality.

The causality of vocalization by androgens is also limited by the American green tree frog's social environment. According to one study, androgens themselves were not sufficient to initiate call signals in male frogs when in the presence of social stimuli such as other frog choruses. This suggests that androgens on their own may provide males with enough motivation to call, but they may also require additional social context to produce various call signals during situations such as mating.

== As pets ==
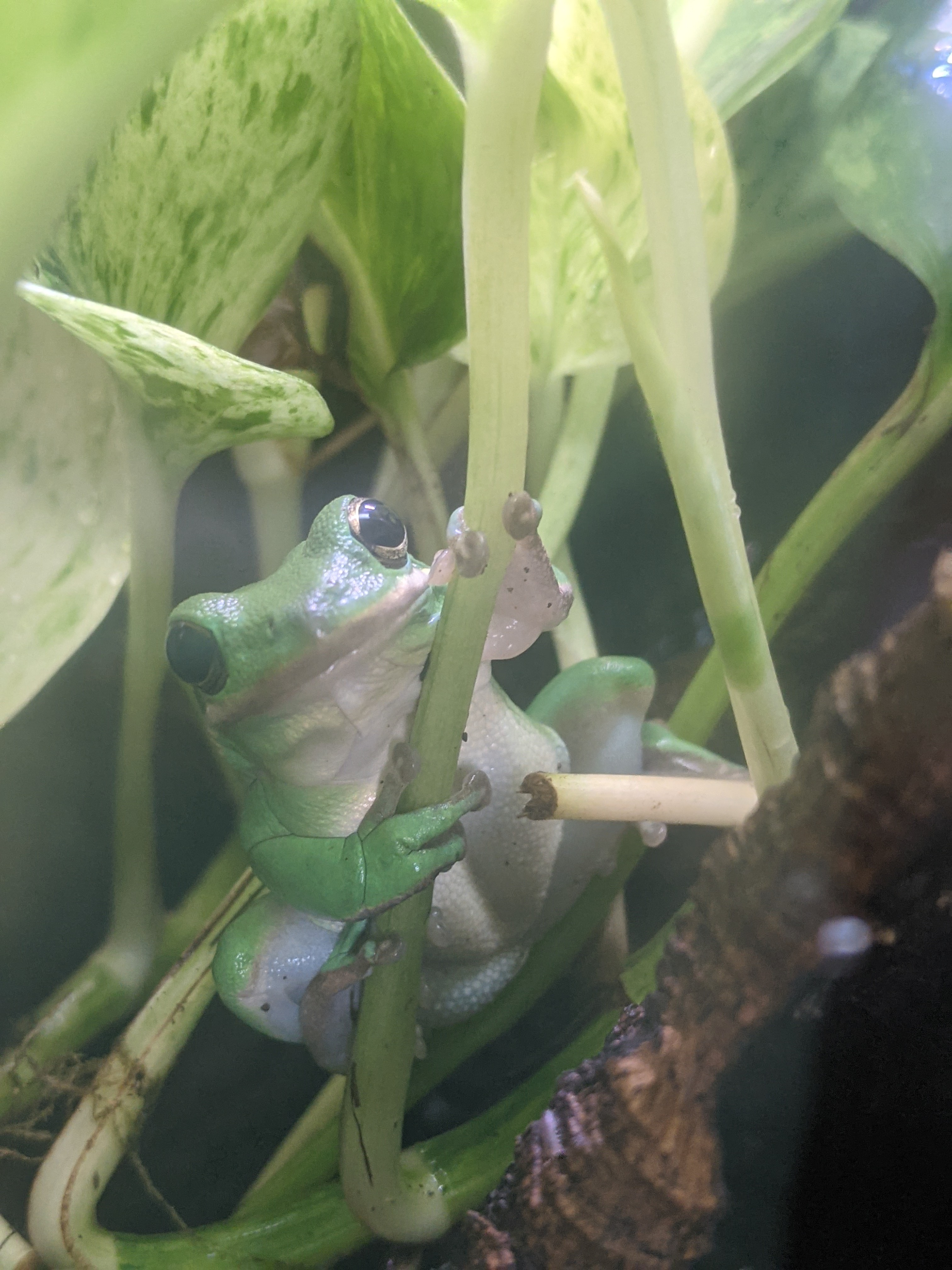
Captive male in a terrarium heavily planted by Epipremnum aureum

American green tree frogs are popular pets because of their small size, appearance, and the undemanding conditions needed to take care of them. Unlike many amphibians, they do not require artificial heating unless household temperatures drop below 21 °C (70 °F). They need a large (at least 30+ gallon) terrarium and do best with a substrate that will hold some humidity, such as commercial shredded bark or coconut husk bedding, or untreated topsoil on the floor of the terrarium. Tree frogs are arboreal, so the height of the tank is more important than the length. A variety of things for climbing, such as plants or branches, should be in the habitat. They need lots of shade and cover. A shallow water dish should be included. Captive frogs should not be handled more than necessary; when necessary, clean gloves should be worn.

== As state symbols and bioindicators ==
The American green tree frog became the state amphibian of Louisiana in 1997 and of Georgia in 2005.

American green tree frogs can also be used as bioindicators for aquatic contamination. Synthetic compounds such as polychlorinated biphenyls are found in many pesticides and pollute the green tree frog's aquatic habitats. Because the frog's skin is thin and permeable, synthetic compounds absorb easily upon contact, making the species a viable variable to measure contamination.
