= Stenocercus pectinatus =

Conservation status
- Least Concern (IUCN 3.1)

Scientific classification
- Kingdom: Animalia
- Phylum: Chordata
- Class: Reptilia
- Order: Squamata
- Suborder: Iguania
- Family: Tropiduridae
- Genus: Stenocercus
- Species: S. pectinatus

Binomial name
- Stenocercus pectinatus (Duméril & Bibron, 1835)

Species of lizard

Stenocercus pectinatus is a species of lizard of the family Tropiduridae. It is found in Argentina.
