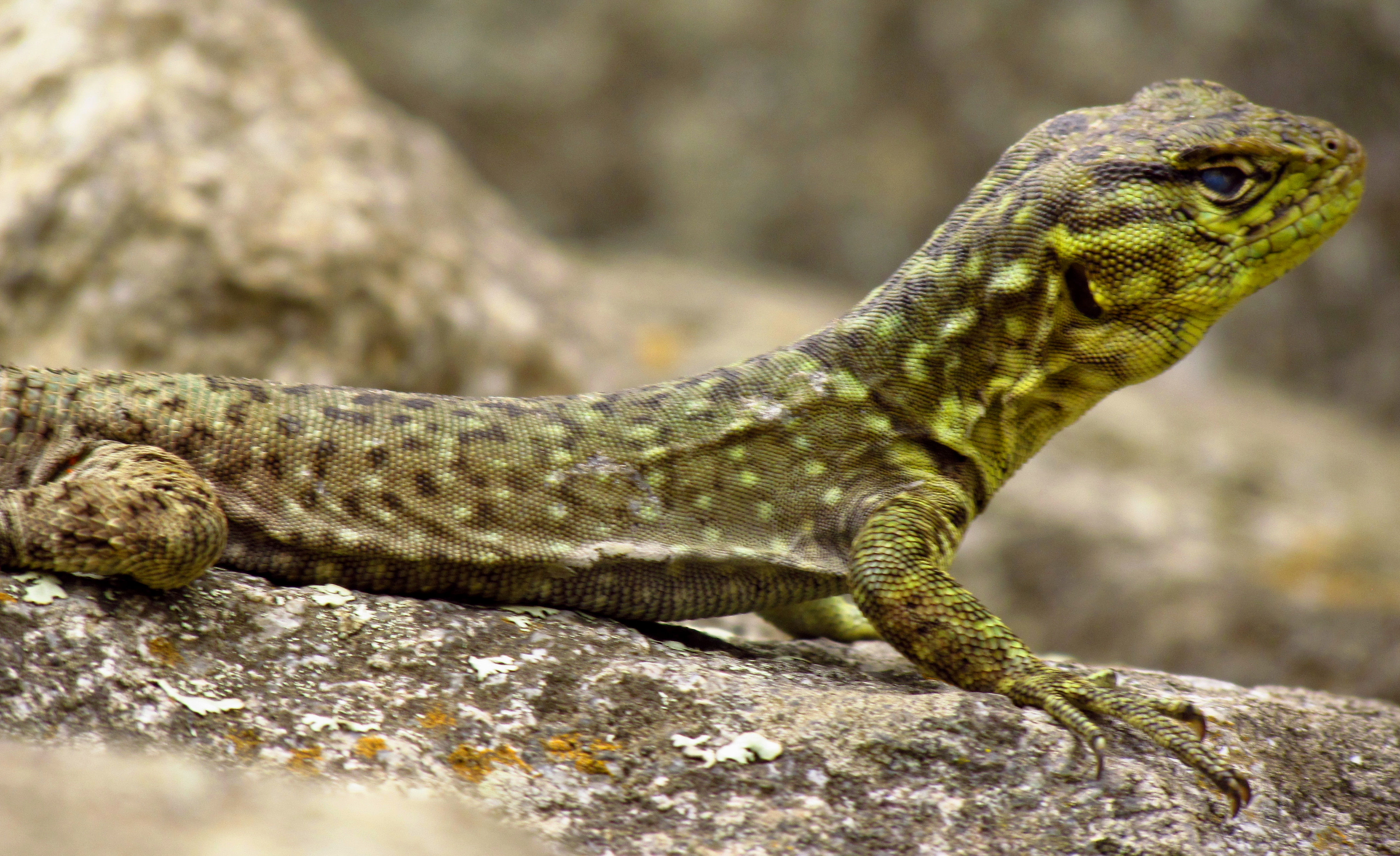

Conservation status
- Least Concern (IUCN 3.1)

Scientific classification
- Kingdom: Animalia
- Phylum: Chordata
- Class: Reptilia
- Order: Squamata
- Suborder: Iguania
- Family: Tropiduridae
- Genus: Stenocercus
- Species: S. crassicaudatus

Binomial name
- Stenocercus crassicaudatus (Tschudi, 1845)

Synonyms
- Scelotrema crassicaudatum Tschudi, 1845; Stenocercus ervingi Stejneger, 1913; Urocentrum meyeri Werner, 1900

= Stenocercus crassicaudatus =

Spiny whorltail iguana

Species of lizard

The spiny whorltail iguana (Stenocercus crassicaudatus) is a species of lizard of the family Tropiduridae, found in the state of Cusco, southeast Peru. It was first described by Johann Jakob von Tschudi in 1845.
