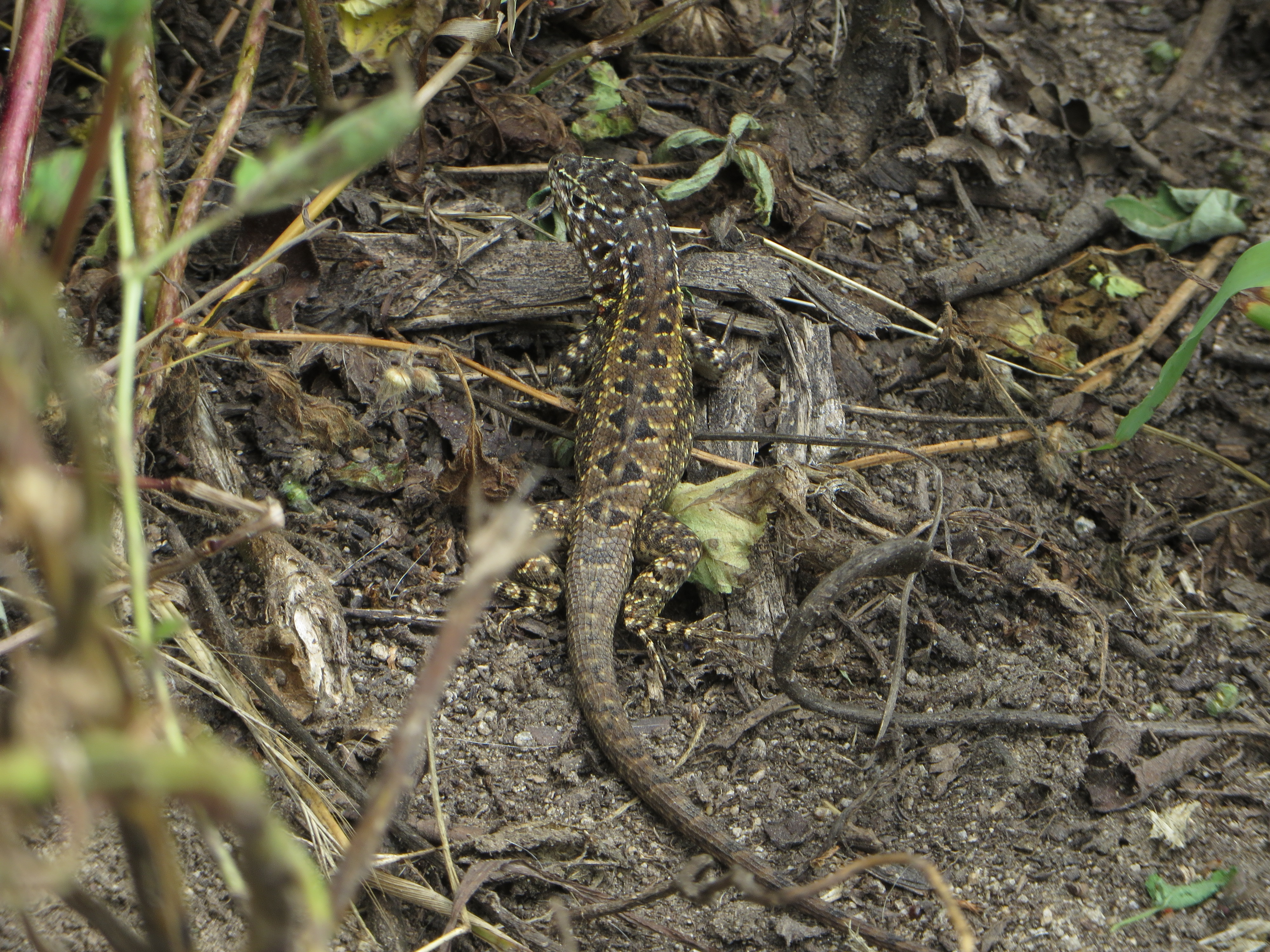

Conservation status
- Near Threatened (IUCN 3.1)

Scientific classification
- Kingdom: Animalia
- Phylum: Chordata
- Class: Reptilia
- Order: Squamata
- Suborder: Iguania
- Family: Tropiduridae
- Genus: Stenocercus
- Species: S. ornatissimus

Binomial name
- Stenocercus ornatissimus (Girard, 1858)

= Stenocercus ornatissimus =

Species of lizard

Stenocercus ornatissimus, the lesser ornate whorltail iguana, is a species of lizard of the family Tropiduridae. It is found in Peru.
