= Stenocercus bolivarensis =

Conservation status
- Data Deficient (IUCN 3.1)

Scientific classification
- Kingdom: Animalia
- Phylum: Chordata
- Class: Reptilia
- Order: Squamata
- Suborder: Iguania
- Family: Tropiduridae
- Genus: Stenocercus
- Species: S. bolivarensis

Binomial name
- Stenocercus bolivarensis Castro & Ayala, 1982

Species of lizard

Stenocercus bolivarensis, the Bolivar whorltail iguana, is a species of lizard of the family Tropiduridae. It is found in Colombia.
