= Stenocercus amydrorhytus =

Scientific classification
- Kingdom: Animalia
- Phylum: Chordata
- Class: Reptilia
- Order: Squamata
- Suborder: Iguania
- Family: Tropiduridae
- Genus: Stenocercus
- Species: S. amydrorhytus

Binomial name
- Stenocercus amydrorhytus G. Köhler & Lehr, 2015

Species of lizard

Stenocercus amydrorhytus is a species of lizard of the family Tropiduridae. It is found in Peru.
