= Stenocercus angel =

Conservation status
- Near Threatened (IUCN 3.1)

Scientific classification
- Kingdom: Animalia
- Phylum: Chordata
- Class: Reptilia
- Order: Squamata
- Suborder: Iguania
- Family: Tropiduridae
- Genus: Stenocercus
- Species: S. angel

Binomial name
- Stenocercus angel Torres-Carvajal, 2000

Species of lizard

Stenocercus angel is a species of lizard in the family Tropiduridae. The species is endemic to Ecuador.
