= Stenocercus cadlei =

Conservation status
- Least Concern (IUCN 3.1)

Scientific classification
- Kingdom: Animalia
- Phylum: Chordata
- Class: Reptilia
- Order: Squamata
- Suborder: Iguania
- Family: Tropiduridae
- Genus: Stenocercus
- Species: S. cadlei

Binomial name
- Stenocercus cadlei Torres-Carvajal & Mafla-Endara, 2013

Species of lizard

Stenocercus cadlei is a species of lizard of the family Tropiduridae. It is found in Ecuador.
