= Stenocercus ica =

Scientific classification
- Kingdom: Animalia
- Phylum: Chordata
- Class: Reptilia
- Order: Squamata
- Suborder: Iguania
- Family: Tropiduridae
- Genus: Stenocercus
- Species: S. ica

Binomial name
- Stenocercus ica Mendoza, Ramírez, Barrera, & Aguilar-Puntriano, 2021

Species of lizard

Stenocercus ica is a species of lizard of the family Tropiduridae. It is found in Peru.
