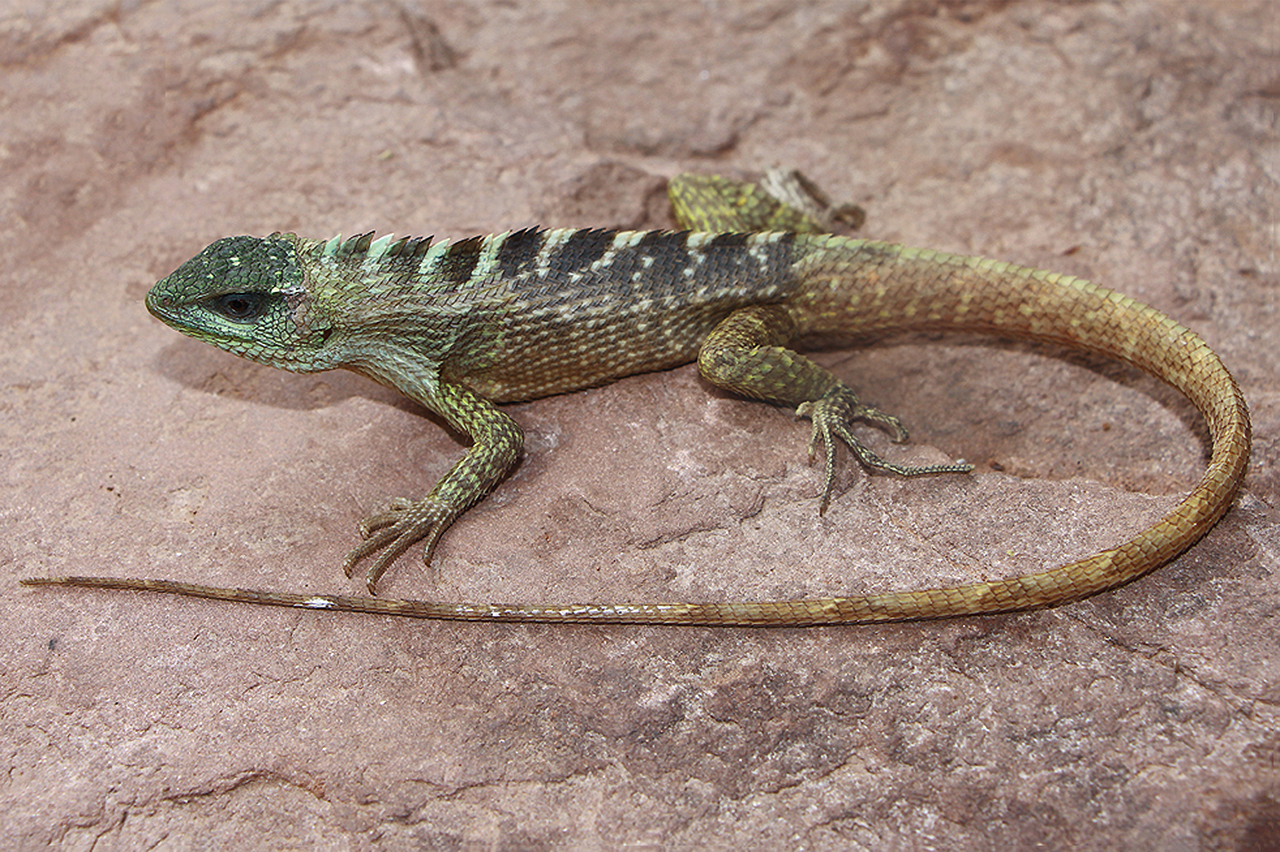

Scientific classification
- Kingdom: Animalia
- Phylum: Chordata
- Class: Reptilia
- Order: Squamata
- Suborder: Iguania
- Family: Tropiduridae
- Genus: Stenocercus
- Species: S. philmayi

Binomial name
- Stenocercus philmayi Venegas, Garcia-Ayachi, Chávez-Arribasplata, Chávez, Wong, & Garcia-Bravo, 2020

= Stenocercus philmayi =

Species of lizard

Stenocercus philmayi is a species of lizard of the family Tropiduridae. It is found in Peru.

== Taxonomy ==
Stenocercus philmayi was formally described in 2020 based on an adult male specimen collected from near Las Corontas in Pisuquía District in the Amazonas Department of Peru. The species is named after Philip May, an American lichenologist and philanthropist who helped supported the conservation of endangered ecosystems in the Amazonas, Cajamarca, and La Libertad departments of Peru.

== Description ==
Adult males have a greenish-gray dorsum with dark brown chevrons and narrow greenish white interspaces over the vertebral line. The flanks are dusty-brown splattered with whitish dots. The dorsal surface of the limbs is olive green with scattered faint brown specks and the dorsal surface of tail is dusty brown with the crest greenish-cream and faint cream transversal stripes. The dorsal surface of the head is pale green, with some scattered cream dots. The sides of the neck and head are greenish-cream, with the ocular region dark green. Ventrally, the gular region is pale greenish cream, with the neck and chest slightly paler. The belly and tail are cream with a tan hue. The pelvic region is pale cream and the hind-limbs are tan. The iris is dark brown.

The species shows strong sexual dimorphism. The dorsum is dark brown with thin darker brown chevrons and darker thin brown bars on the hind-limbs. A longitudinal cream stripe extends from the loreal region to scapular region, becoming faint from the temporal region. The venter is completely cream, with no markings.

Juvenile males have the same dorsal pattern as adults, but with brown dorsal surfaces of the head is brown, no greenish hue on the sides of head, neck, and forearms, and a cream dorsolateral stripe from the loreal region to the scapular region or the base of tail. Ventrally, they are cream with scattered elongate pale gray blotches on neck, chest, and sides of belly. The only known hatchling had a dark brown dorsum with narrow black chevrons over the vertebral line and a longitudinal cream stripe from the loreal region to the scapular region. The dorsal surface of the hindlimbs had thin black bars. The venter was cream, without any markings.

== Distribution and habitat ==
Stenocercus philmayi is only known from Las Corontas in the northern portion of the central Andes at elevations of 1340–1470 m within the Río Marañón basin. It inhabits the Marañón dry forests and the equatorial dry forest ecoregions. An unknown Stenocercus from Balsas village, 40.5 km to the south of the type locality, may also belong to this species.

The general landscape in its habitat is an ecotone between dry forest and humid montane forest. The dry forest in this zone has high trees with a canopy between 4 and 6 m, dense understory vegetation and scattered patches of cacti. Individuals have been observed during sunny days during the morning and afternoon, basking on fallen logs close to trails that border or cross patches of forest. Other basking locations include on understory vegetation, rocks in patches of cacti, and rocky fences with bushes near houses. A female collected during the rainy season in December had 2 eggs in her body, one in each ovary.
