= Stenocercus dumerilii =

Conservation status
- Vulnerable (IUCN 3.1)

Scientific classification
- Kingdom: Animalia
- Phylum: Chordata
- Class: Reptilia
- Order: Squamata
- Suborder: Iguania
- Family: Tropiduridae
- Genus: Stenocercus
- Species: S. dumerilii

Binomial name
- Stenocercus dumerilii (Steindachner, 1867)

Synonyms
- Ophryoessoides dumerilii Steindachner, 1867; Liocephalus dumerilii — Boulenger, 1885; Leiocephalus dumerilii — C. Burt & M. Burt, 1933; Stenocercus dumerilii — Ávila-Pires, 1995

Species of lizard

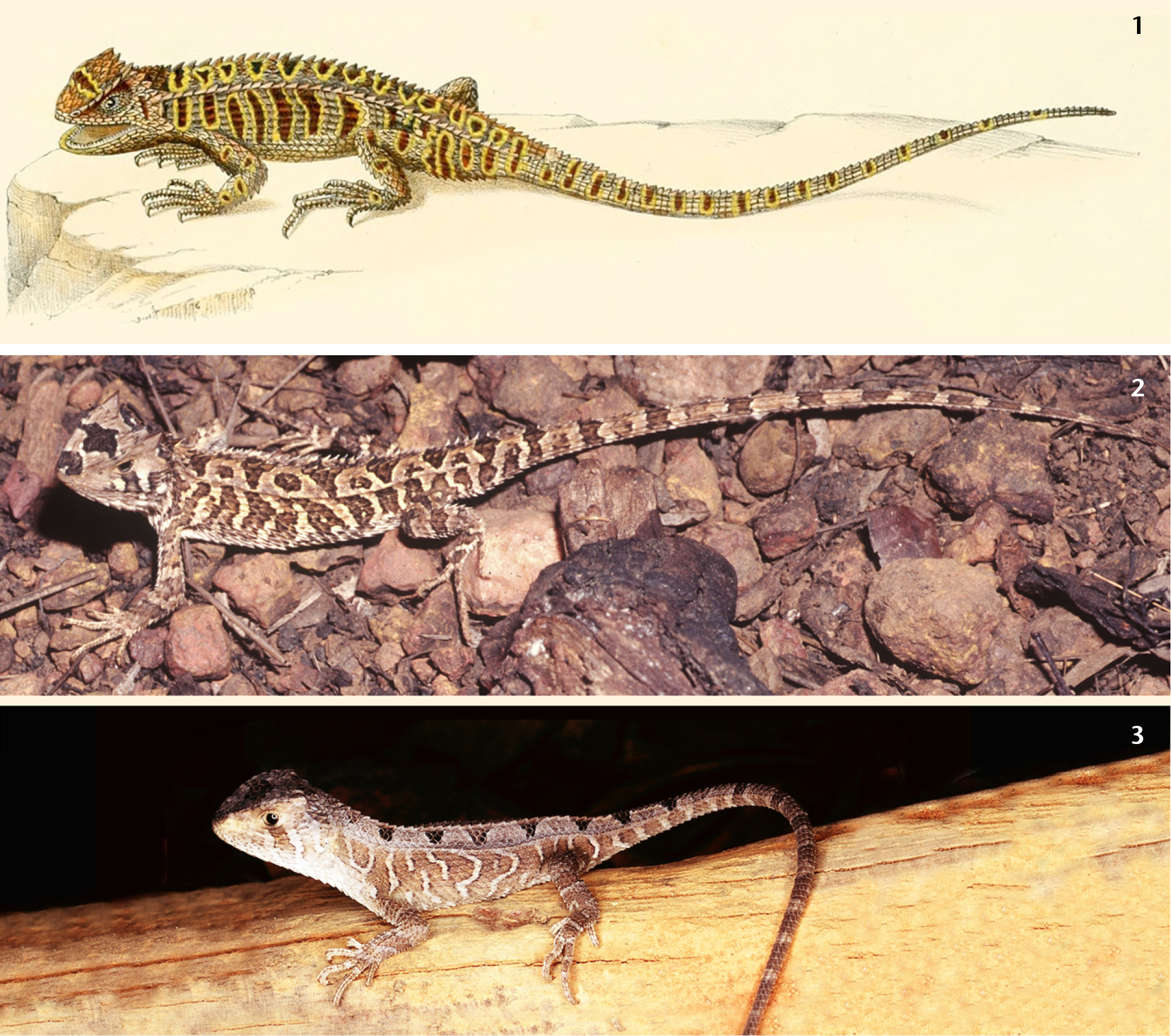
Figures (1) Drawing of Stenocercus tricristatus from Plate XXII in Duméril (1851); (2) photograph of a live adult specimen of Stenocercus canastra sp. nov; (3) photograph of a live juvenile specimen of S. canatra sp. nov

Stenocercus dumerilii is a species of lizard in the family Tropiduridae. The species is endemic to Brazil.

== Etymology ==
The specific name, dumerilii, is in honor of French herpetologist André Marie Constant Duméril.

== Geographic range ==
S. dumerilii is found in northeastern Brazil, in the Brazilian states of Maranhão, northeastern Pará, and Tocantins.

== Habitat ==
The preferred natural habitat of S. dumerilii is forest.

== Diet ==
S. dumerilii preys upon a wide variety of arthropods.

== Reproduction ==
S. dumerilii is oviparous. Clutch size is 2–6 eggs.
