= Stenocercus qalaywasi =

Scientific classification
- Kingdom: Animalia
- Phylum: Chordata
- Class: Reptilia
- Order: Squamata
- Suborder: Iguania
- Family: Tropiduridae
- Genus: Stenocercus
- Species: S. qalaywasi

Binomial name
- Stenocercus qalaywasi Venegas, Garcia-Ayachi, Chavez-Arribasplata, & Garcia-Bravo, 2022

Species of lizard

Stenocercus qalaywasi is a species of lizard of the family Tropiduridae. It is found in Peru.
