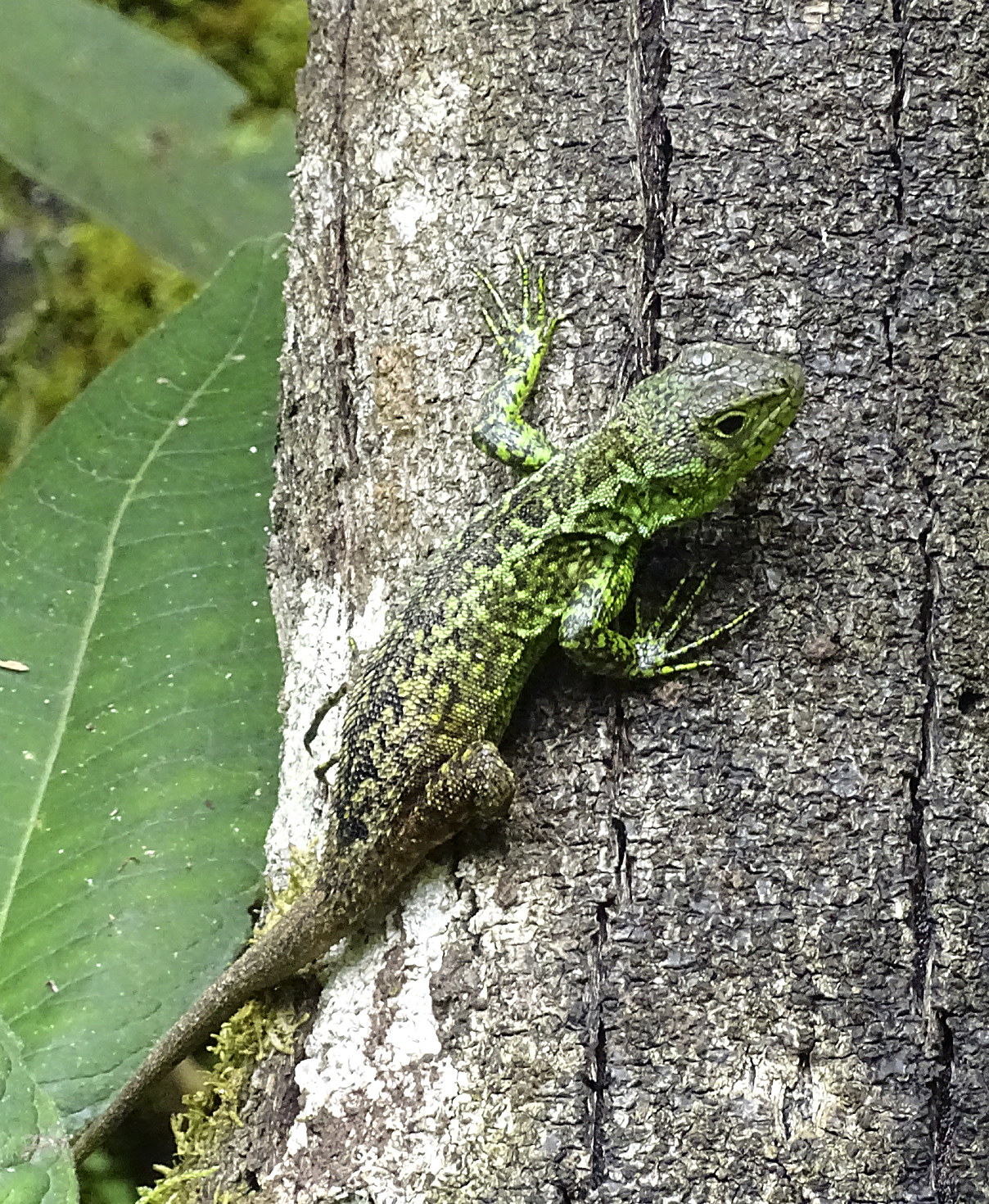

Conservation status
- Endangered (IUCN 3.1)

Scientific classification
- Kingdom: Animalia
- Phylum: Chordata
- Class: Reptilia
- Order: Squamata
- Suborder: Iguania
- Family: Tropiduridae
- Genus: Stenocercus
- Species: S. varius

Binomial name
- Stenocercus varius Boulenger, 1885

= Stenocercus varius =

Species of lizard

Stenocercus varius, commonly known as the keeled whorltail iguana, is a species of lizard in the family Tropiduridae. It is found in Ecuador.
