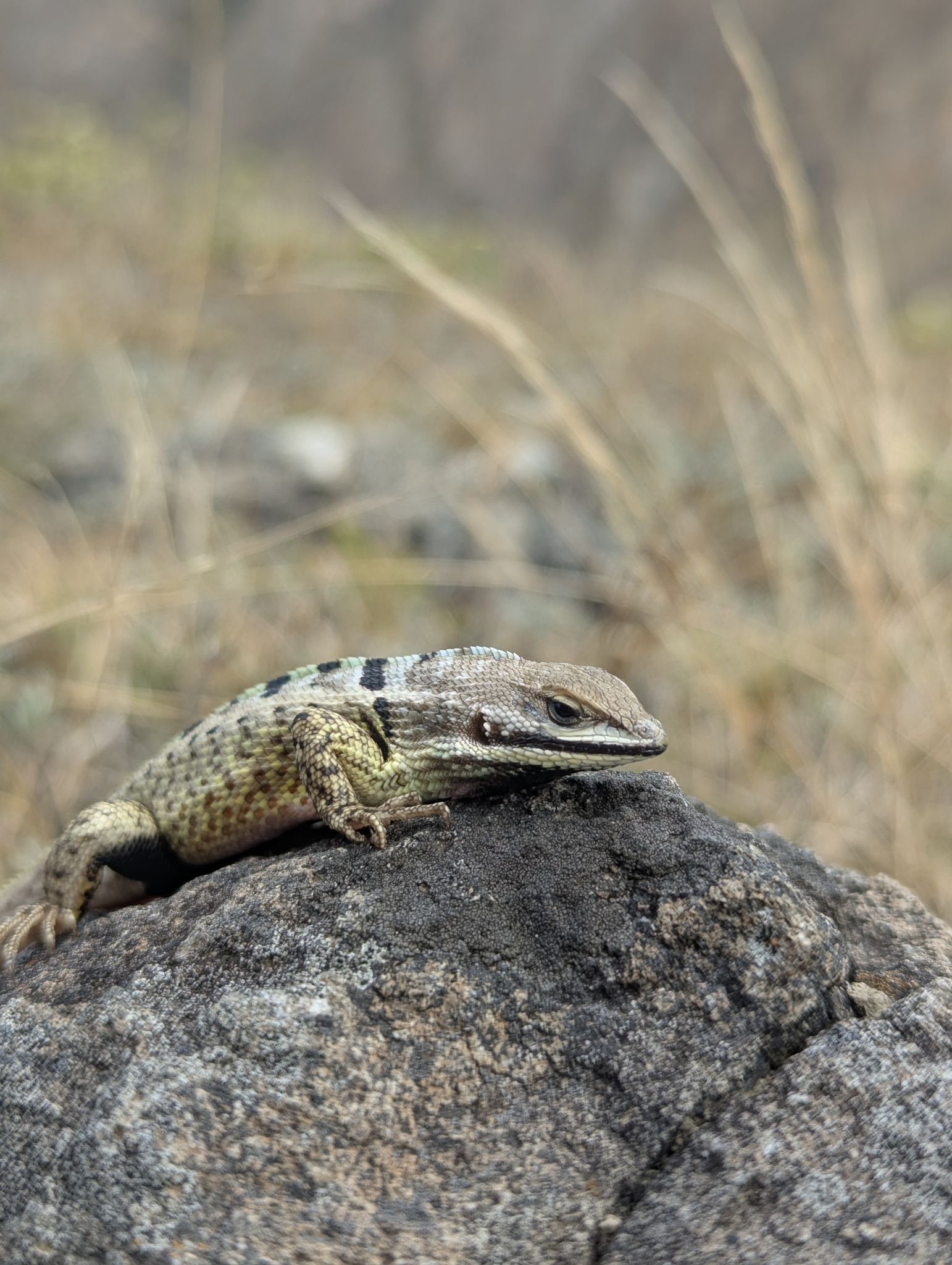

Conservation status
- Vulnerable (IUCN 3.1)

Scientific classification
- Kingdom: Animalia
- Phylum: Chordata
- Class: Reptilia
- Order: Squamata
- Suborder: Iguania
- Family: Tropiduridae
- Genus: Stenocercus
- Species: S. rhodomelas

Binomial name
- Stenocercus rhodomelas (Boulenger, 1899)

= Stenocercus rhodomelas =

Species of lizard

Stenocercus rhodomelas, the red-black whorltail iguana, is a species of lizard of the family Tropiduridae. It is found in Ecuador.
