= Stenocercus carrioni =

Conservation status
- Endangered (IUCN 3.1)

Scientific classification
- Kingdom: Animalia
- Phylum: Chordata
- Class: Reptilia
- Order: Squamata
- Suborder: Iguania
- Family: Tropiduridae
- Genus: Stenocercus
- Species: S. carrioni

Binomial name
- Stenocercus carrioni Parker, 1934

Species of lizard

Stenocercus carrioni, Parker's whorltail iguana, is a species of lizard of the family Tropiduridae. It is found in Ecuador.
