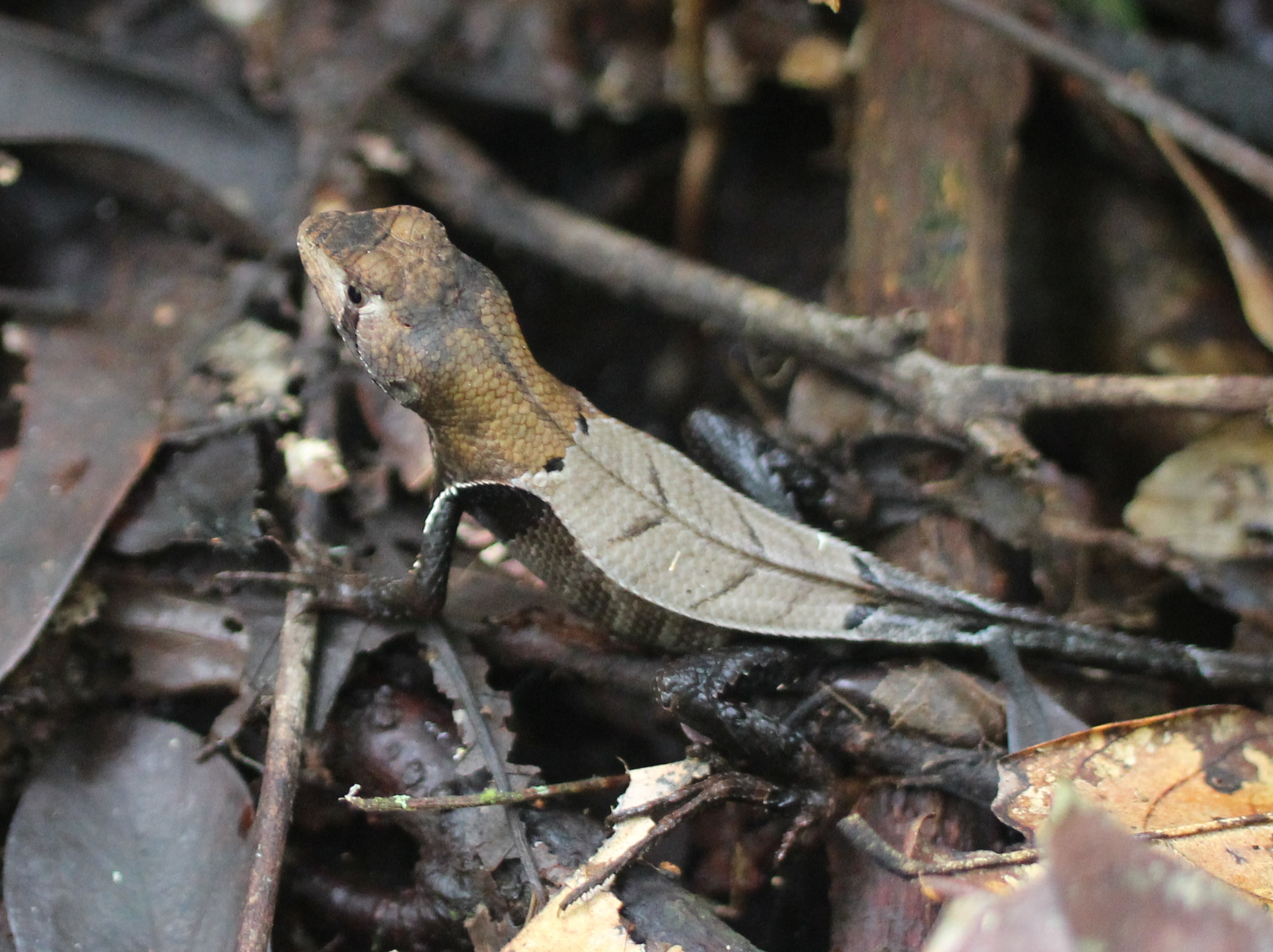

Conservation status
- Least Concern (IUCN 3.1)

Scientific classification
- Kingdom: Animalia
- Phylum: Chordata
- Class: Reptilia
- Order: Squamata
- Suborder: Iguania
- Family: Tropiduridae
- Genus: Stenocercus
- Species: S. fimbriatus

Binomial name
- Stenocercus fimbriatus Avila-Pires, 1995

= Stenocercus fimbriatus =

Western leaf lizard

Species of lizard

Stenocercus fimbriatus, the western leaf lizard, is a species of lizard in the family Tropiduridae. It is found in the eastern Amazon Basin in Peru, Brazil, and Bolivia.

Stenocercus fimbriatus has cryptic coloration that gives it resemblance of a dead leave. Males grow to 72 mm (2.8 in) and females to 87 mm (3.4 in) in snout–vent length (SVL). The tail is 1.6–2.2 times SVL. It is oviparous.

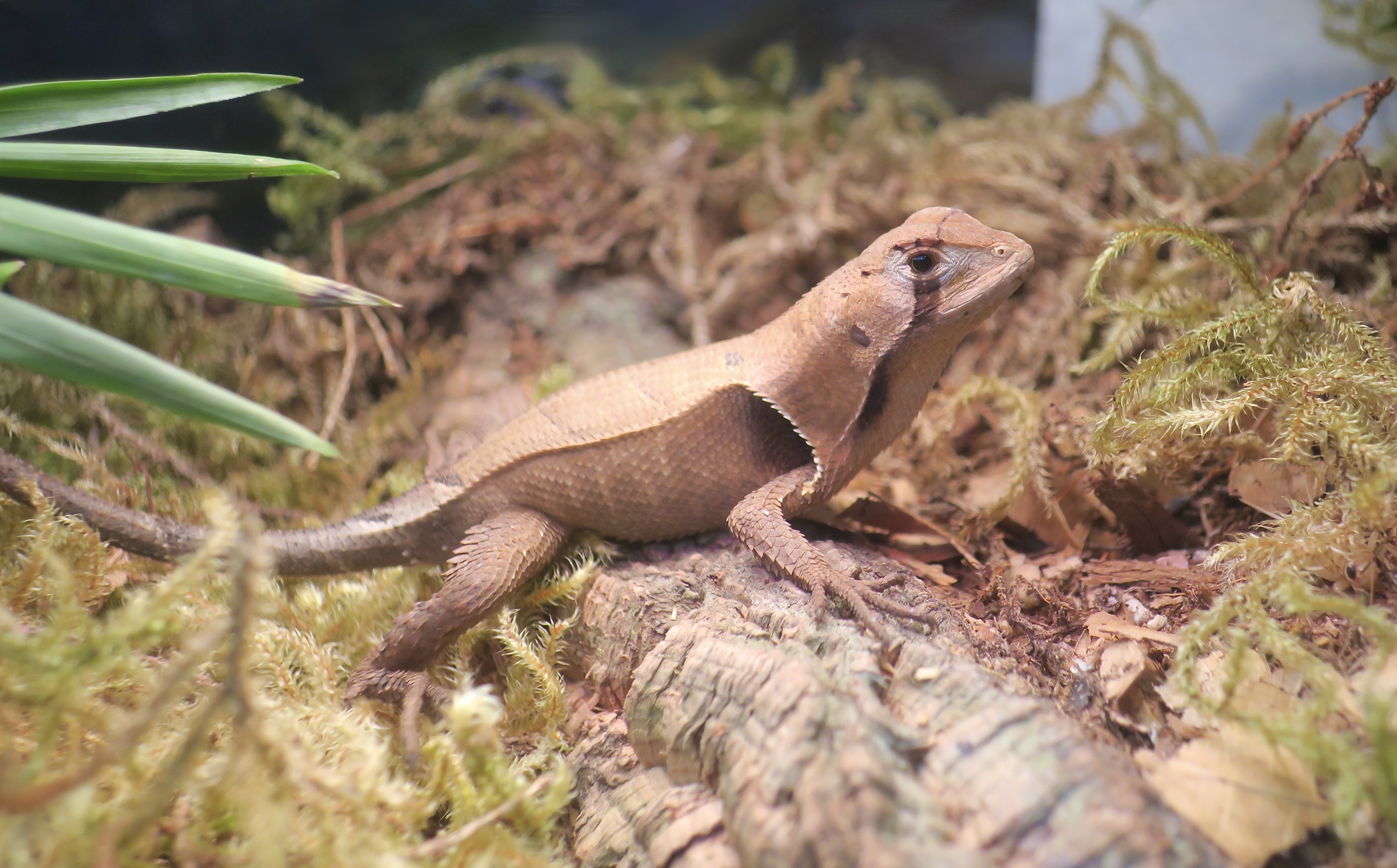
At LLL Reptiles, a reptile store in Henderson, Nevada.
