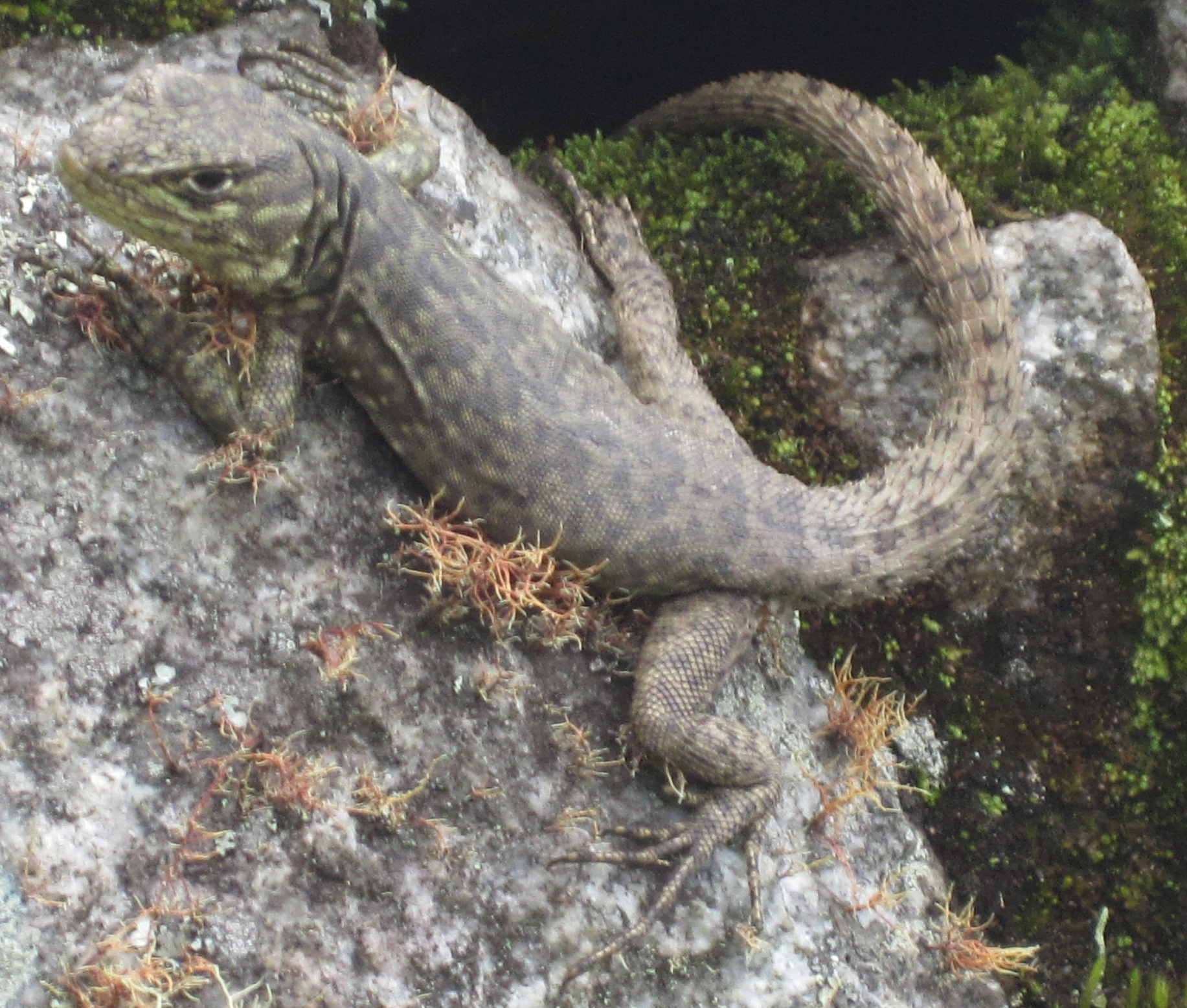
- Stenocercus crassicaudatus (spiny whorltail iguana) at Machu Picchu.

Scientific classification
- Kingdom: Animalia
- Phylum: Chordata
- Class: Reptilia
- Order: Squamata
- Suborder: Iguania
- Family: Tropiduridae
- Genus: Stenocercus; A.M.C. Duméril & Bibron, 1837

Type species
- Iguana pectinata A.M.C. Duméril & Bibron, 1835

Species
- 80, see text

Synonyms
- Brachysaurus

= Stenocercus =

Genus of lizards

Stenocercus is a genus of South American lizards, commonly called whorltail iguanas, of the family Tropiduridae. This genus has 80 valid described species. Members of the genus Stenocercus are found in Ecuador and Peru, Colombia, Brazil, Bolivia, Paraguay, Uruguay, and northern Argentina.

== Species ==
The following 80 species are recognized, listed alphabetically by scientific name.

- Stenocercus aculeatus (O’Shaughnessy, 1879)
- Stenocercus albolineatus Teixeira, Prates, Nisa, Silva-Martins, Strüssmann & Rodrigues, 2015
- Stenocercus amydrorhytus G. Köhler & Lehr, 2015
- Stenocercus angel Torres-Carvajal, 2000
- Stenocercus angulifer (F. Werner, 1901)
- Stenocercus apurimacus Fritts, 1972 – Fritts's whorltail iguana
- Stenocercus arndti Venegas, Echevarria & Alvarez, 2014
- Stenocercus asenlignus Venegas, García-Ayachi, Chávez-Arribasplata & Garcia-Bravo, 2022
- Stenocercus azureus (F. Müller, 1880)
- Stenocercus boettgeri Boulenger, 1911 – Boettger's whorltail iguana
- Stenocercus bolivarensis Castro & Ayala, 1982 – Bolivar whorltail iguana
- Stenocercus cadlei Torres-Carvajal & Mafla-Endara, 2013
- Stenocercus caducus (Cope, 1862)
- Stenocercus canastra Ávila-Pires, Nogueira & Martins, 2019
- Stenocercus carrioni Parker, 1934 – Parker's whorltail iguana
- Stenocercus catherineae Venegas, García-Ayachi, Chávez-Arribasplata, Chávez, Wong & Garcia-Bravo, 2020
- Stenocercus chinchaoensis Venegas, Duran & García-Burneo, 2013
- Stenocercus chlorostictus Cadle, 1991
- Stenocercus chota Torres-Carvajal, 2000
- Stenocercus chrysopygus Boulenger, 1900 – golden whorltail iguana
- Stenocercus crassicaudatus (Tschudi, 1845) – spiny whorltail iguana
- Stenocercus cupreus Boulenger, 1885 – copper whorltail iguana
- Stenocercus diploauris Venegas, Echevarria, García-Ayachi & Landauro, 2020
- Stenocercus doellojuradoi (Freiberg, 1944)
- Stenocercus dracopennatus Venegas, García-Ayachi, Chávez-Arribasplata, Chávez, Wong & Garcia-Bravo, 2020
- Stenocercus dumerilii (Steindachner, 1867)
- Stenocercus empetrus Fritts, 1972 – rock whorltail iguana
- Stenocercus erythrogaster (Hallowell, 1856)
- Stenocercus eunetopsis Cadle, 1991
- Stenocercus festae (Peracca, 1897) – Peracca's whorltail iguana
- Stenocercus fimbriatus Ávila-Pires, 1995 – western leaf lizard
- Stenocercus flagracanthus Venegas, García-Ayachi, Chávez-Arribasplata, Chávez, Wong & Garcia-Bravo, 2020
- Stenocercus formosus (Tschudi, 1845)
- Stenocercus frittsi Torres-Carvajal, 2005
- Stenocercus guentheri (Boulenger, 1885) – Günther's whorltail iguana
- Stenocercus haenschi (F. Werner, 1901) – Haensch's whorltail iguana
- Stenocercus huancabambae Cadle, 1991
- Stenocercus humeralis (Günther, 1859) – patterned whorltail iguana
- Stenocercus ica Mendoza, Ramírez, Barrera & Aguilar-Puntriano, 2021
- Stenocercus imitator Cadle, 1991
- Stenocercus iridescens (Günther, 1859)
- Stenocercus ivitus Fritts, 1972 – ivy whorltail iguana
- Stenocercus johaberfellneri G. Köhler & Lehr, 2015
- Stenocercus lache Corredor, 1983
- Stenocercus latebrosus Cadle, 1998
- Stenocercus leybachi Venegas, García-Ayachi, Chavez-Arribasplata & Garcia-Bravo, 2022
- Stenocercus limitaris Cadle, 1998
- Stenocercus marmoratus (A.M.C. Duméril & Bibron, 1837)
- Stenocercus melanopygus Boulenger, 1900 – dark whorltail iguana
- Stenocercus modestus (Tschudi, 1845) – modest whorltail iguana
- Stenocercus nigrobarbatus Venegas, Echevarria, García-Ayachi & Landauro, 2020
- Stenocercus nigrocaudatus Venegas, García-Ayachi, Chávez-Arribasplata & Garcia-Bravo, 2022
- Stenocercus nigromaculatus Noble, 1924 – black-spotted whorltail iguana
- Stenocercus nubicola Fritts, 1972 – cloud whorltail iguana
- Stenocercus ochoai Fritts, 1972 – Ochoa whorltail iguana
- Stenocercus omari Venegas, Echevarría, García-Burneo & Koch, 2016
- Stenocercus orientalis Fritts, 1972 – eastern whorltail iguana
- Stenocercus ornatissimus (Girard, 1857) – lesser ornate whorltail iguana
- Stenocercus ornatus (Gray, 1845) – Girard's whorltail iguana
- Stenocercus pectinatus (A.M.C. Duméril & Bibron, 1835)
- Stenocercus percultus Cadle, 1991
- Stenocercus philmayi Venegas, García-Ayachi, Chávez-Arribasplata, Chávez, Wong & Garcia-Bravo, 2020
- Stenocercus praeornatus Fritts, 1972 – greater ornate whorltail iguana
- Stenocercus prionotus Cadle, 2001
- Stenocercus puyango Torres-Carvajal, 2005
- Stenocercus qalaywasi Venegas, García-Ayachi, Chávez-Arribasplata & Garcia-Bravo, 2022
- Stenocercus quinarius Nogueira & Rodrigues, 2006
- Stenocercus rhodomelas (Boulenger, 1899) – red-black whorltail iguana
- Stenocercus roseiventris D’Orbigny in A.M.C. Duméril & Bibron, 1837 – rose whorltail iguana
- Stenocercus santander Torres-Carvajal, 2007
- Stenocercus scapularis (Boulenger, 1901)
- Stenocercus simonsii Boulenger, 1899 – Simons' whorltail iguana
- Stenocercus sinesaccus Torres-Carvajal, 2005
- Stenocercus squarrosus Nogueira & Rodrigues, 2006
- Stenocercus stigmosus Cadle, 1998
- Stenocercus torquatus Boulenger, 1885
- Stenocercus trachycephalus (A.H.A. Duméril, 1851) – Duméril's whorltail iguana
- Stenocercus tricristatus (A.H.A. Duméril, 1851)
- Stenocercus variabilis Boulenger, 1901 – variable whorltail iguana
- Stenocercus varius Boulenger, 1885 – keeled whorltail iguana

Nota bene: A binomial authority in parentheses indicates that the species was originally described in a genus other than Stenocercus.

== Gallery ==
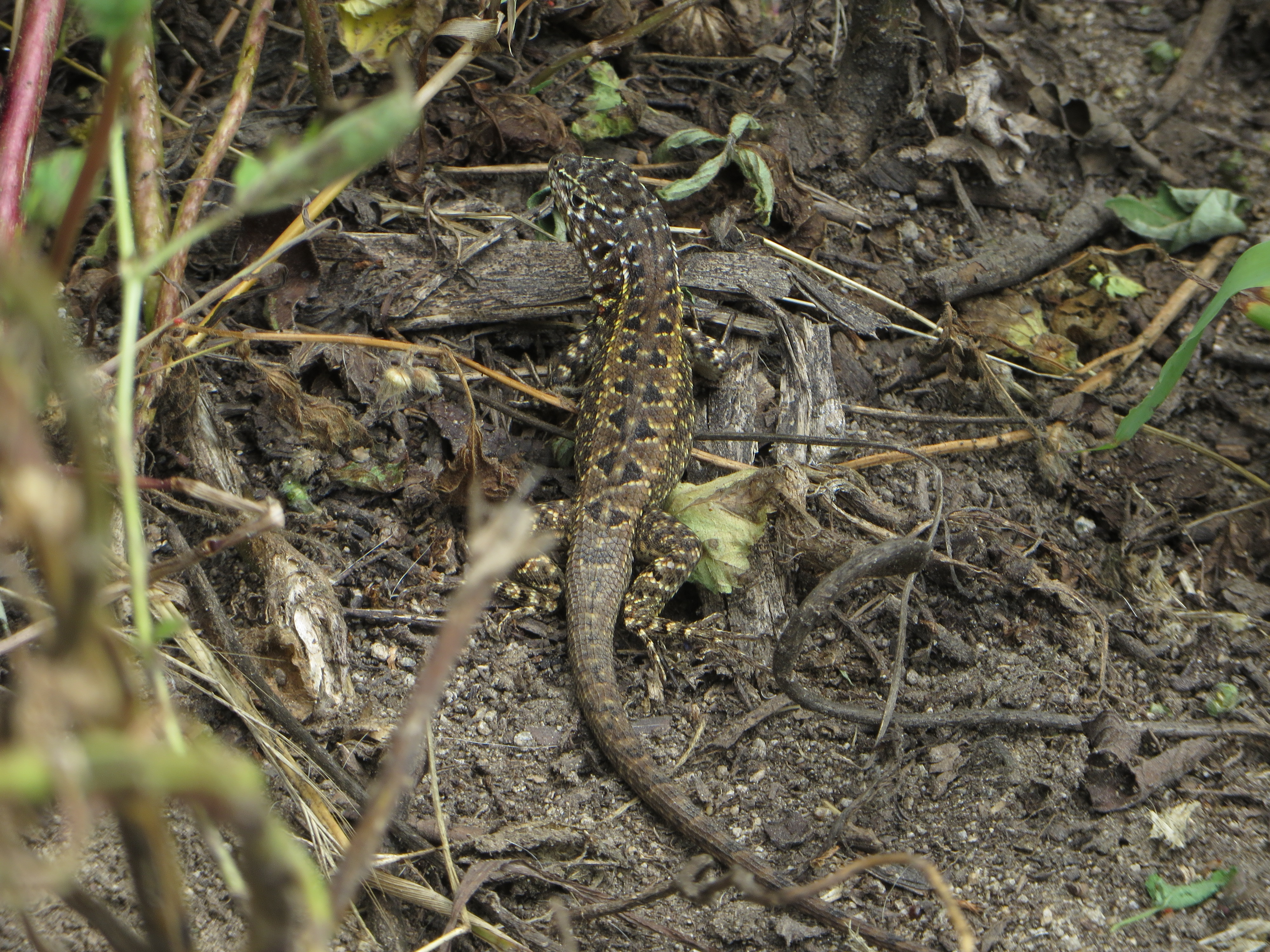
S. ornatissimus, San Jerónimo de Surco, Huarochiri, Lima, Peru

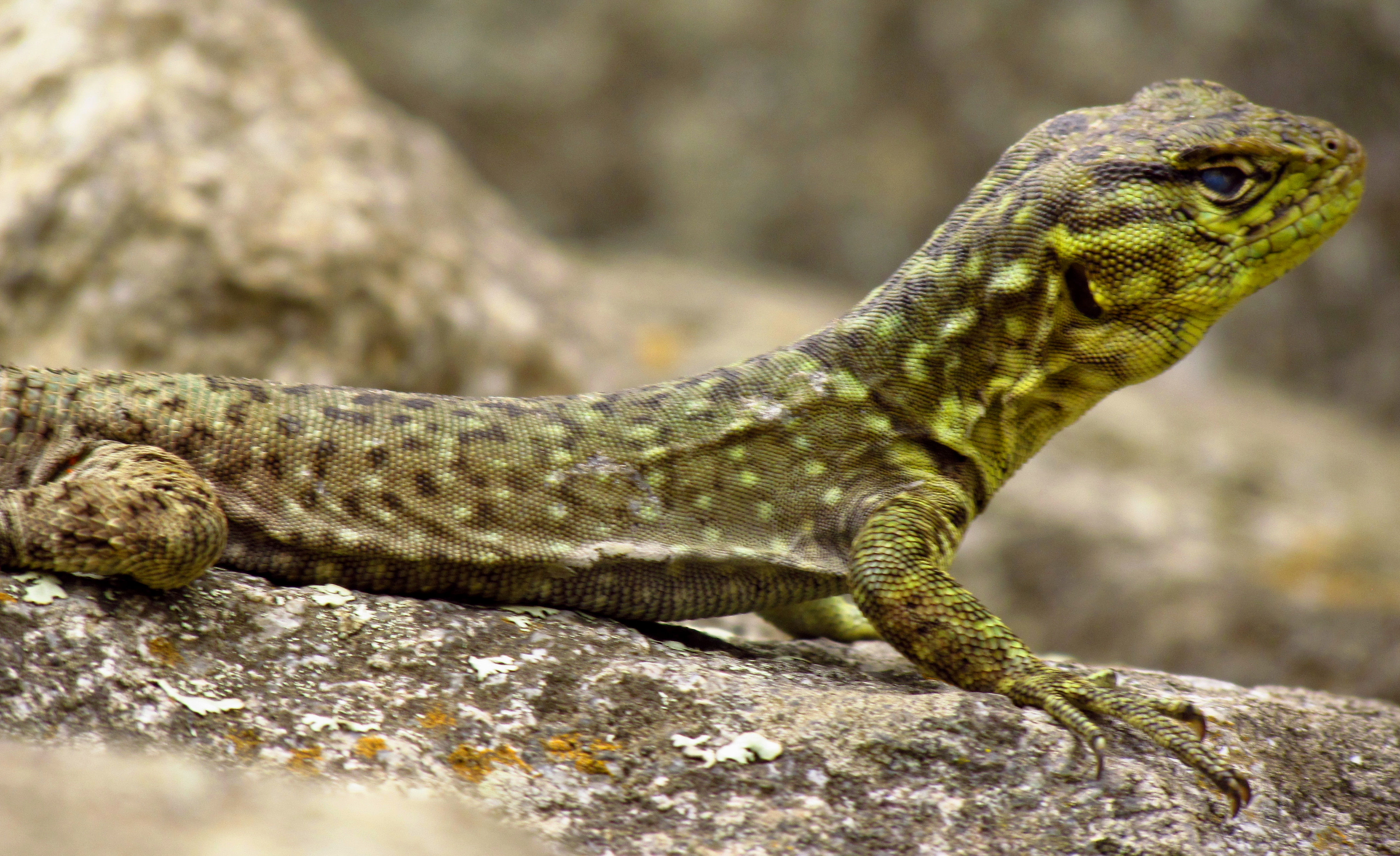
S. crassicaudatus, spiny whorltail iguana, Machu Picchu, Peru
