= Stenocercus arndti =

Conservation status
- Endangered (IUCN 3.1)

Scientific classification
- Kingdom: Animalia
- Phylum: Chordata
- Class: Reptilia
- Order: Squamata
- Suborder: Iguania
- Family: Tropiduridae
- Genus: Stenocercus
- Species: S. arndti

Binomial name
- Stenocercus arndti Venegas, Echevarria & Alvarez, 2014

Species of lizard

Stenocercus arndti, the La Granja whorltail lizard, is a species of lizard of the family Tropiduridae. It is found in Peru.
