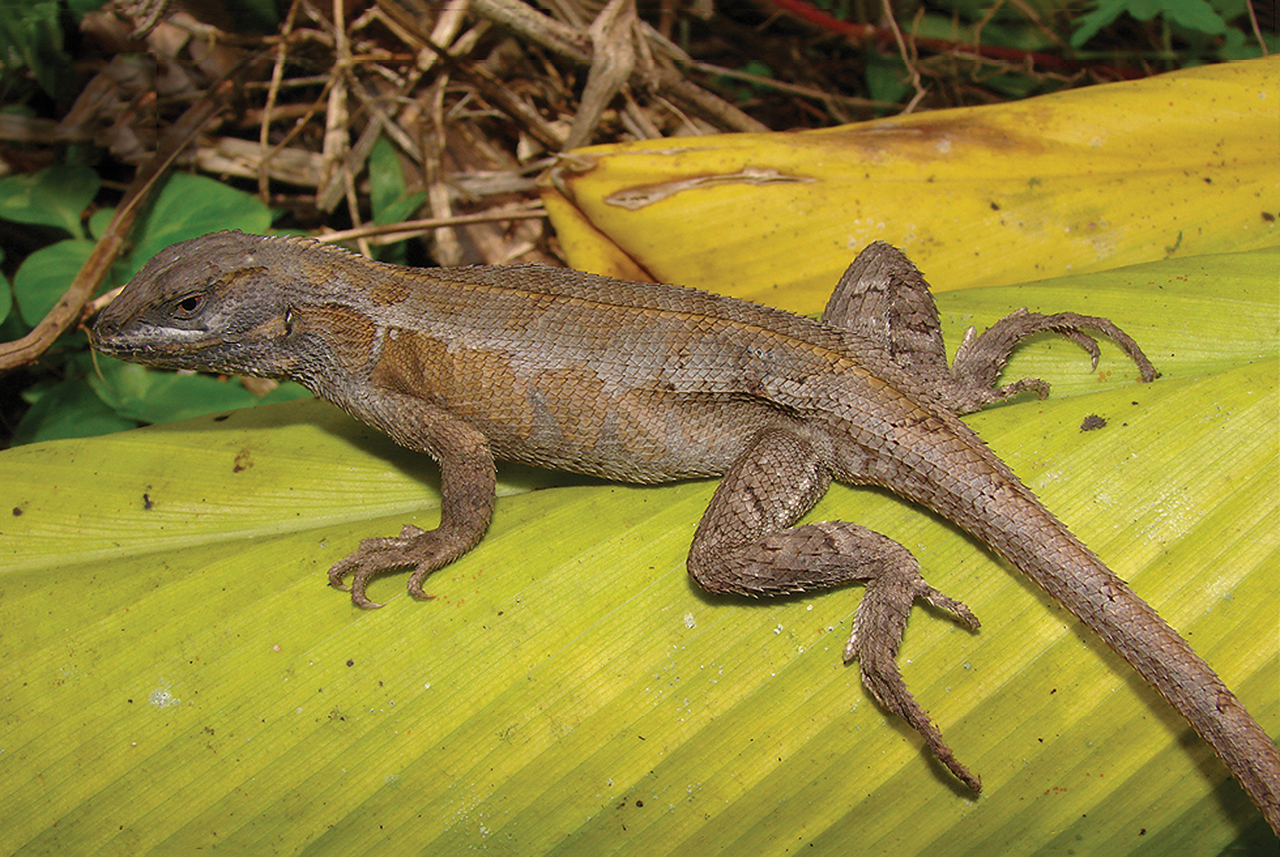

Scientific classification
- Kingdom: Animalia
- Phylum: Chordata
- Class: Reptilia
- Order: Squamata
- Suborder: Iguania
- Family: Tropiduridae
- Genus: Stenocercus
- Species: S. catherineae

Binomial name
- Stenocercus catherineae Venegas, Garcia-Ayachi, Chávez-Arribasplata, Chávez, Wong & Garcia-Bravo, 2020

= Stenocercus catherineae =

Species of lizard

Stenocercus catherineae is a species of lizard of the family Tropiduridae. It is found in Peru.

== Taxonomy ==
Stenocercus catherineae was formally described in 2020 based on an adult male specimen collected from near Huembo in Florida District in the Amazonas Department of Peru. The species is named after Catherine Dupont, a Peruvian veterinary specialist who has supported the herpetological department of CORDIBI.

== Description ==
The adult male holotype had a pale brown dorsum with the first two chevrons over the vertebral line black and the rest being slightly darker than the background. There is a cream line extending vertically from the arm insertion to the scapular region, surrounded by a black blotch. The dorsal surface of limbs is darker than the dorsum with faint dirty-cream transverse bars. The flanks are reddish-brown, including the tail, becoming red toward the venter and dotted with white. The subocular and loreal regions are creamy white. The dorsal surface of the head is black with cream superciliaries and rostral. The labials, sublabials, and mental scales are black, extending as an irregular longitudinal stripe to the neck. The gular region is black with cream irregular blotches to the sides, with a black irregular stripe extending from the gular region ventrolaterally to the arm insertion. The ventral surface of the neck, chest, and forelimbs is dirty cream with a black spot ventrolaterally on the arm. The belly and ventral surface of tail are pink and the pelvic region and ventral surface of the hindlimbs is dirty-cream. The iris is reddish brown. Other males are generally similar to the holotype, differing only in having a few scattered white dots on the head and the extent of the black patch on the gular region.

The species shows strong sexual dimorphism. The dorsal coloration is dusty brown with cinnamon vertebral chevrons along the back and tail and cinnamon blotches along the flanks. The hindlimbs have scattered dark brown transverse stripes. The dark gray or dark brown head is darker than the rest of body. The sides of head is grayish white or dark gray, with the loreal and subocular region white and the labials brown. The ventral coloration is pale brown with a dark brown gular region, or dusty cream with the gular region dark gray. There is a faint pink hue on the belly and base of the tail.

== Distribution and habitat ==
Stenocercus catherineae is only known from three localities at Huembo and Cuispes in the northern extreme of the Cordillera Central at the Río Utcubamba basin in the Peruvian Department of Amazonas, at elevations of 1466 to 2085 m. This species occurs in the Peruvian Yungas ecoregion. The habitat at its type locality is a steep area located on the sides of the Río Chido with presence of corn, coffee, and fruit plantations, and some patches of secondary forest and shrub vegetation. These lizards have been seen basking on fallen tree trunks or at the base of bushes close to trails, running inside fern patches if disturbed. At Cuispes, it has been seen in croplands close to a village. At Cocachimba, it has been observed basking on the base of rocky fences and on fallen walls in an abandoned houses.
