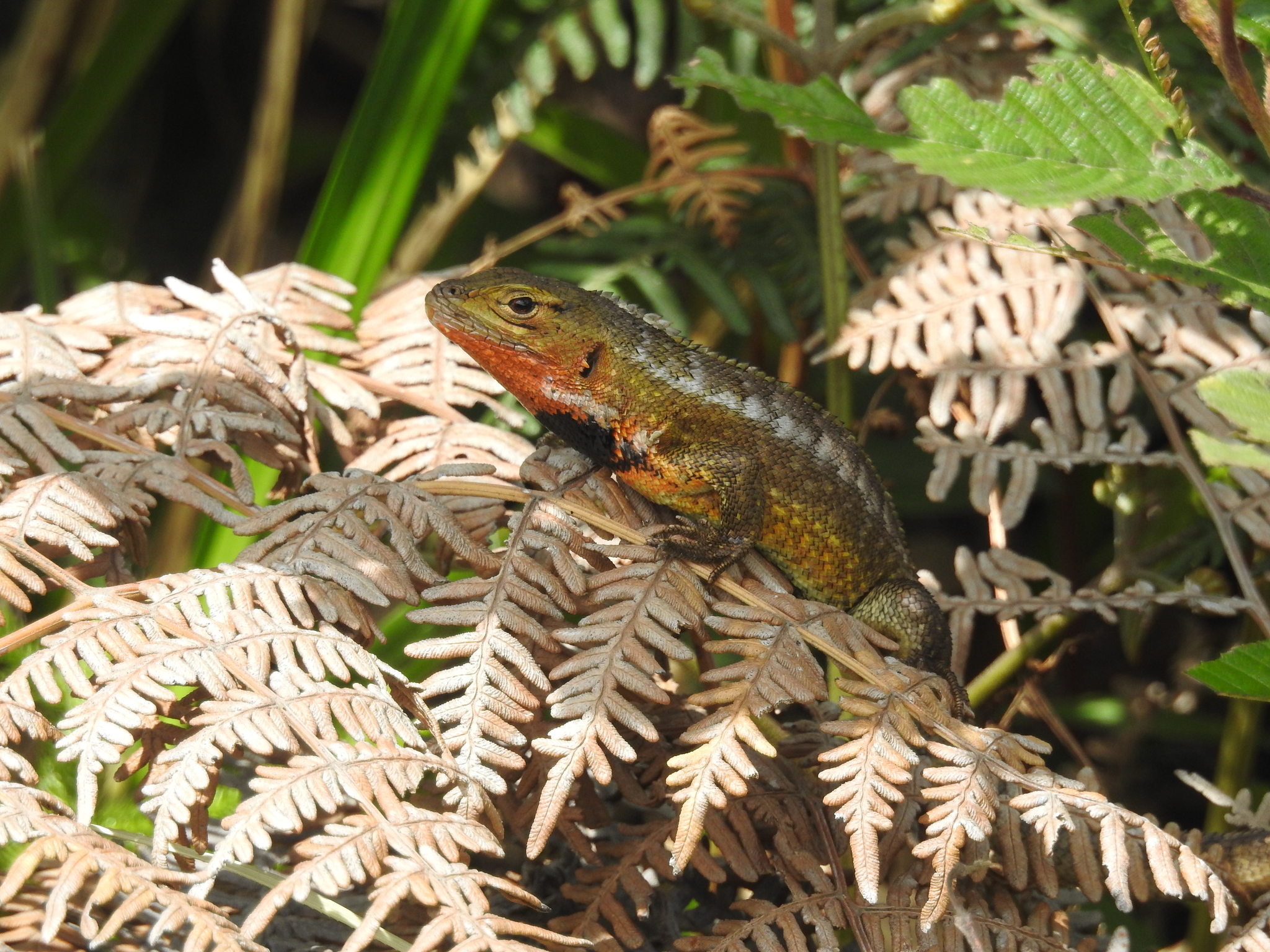

Conservation status
- Vulnerable (IUCN 3.1)

Scientific classification
- Kingdom: Animalia
- Phylum: Chordata
- Class: Reptilia
- Order: Squamata
- Suborder: Iguania
- Family: Tropiduridae
- Genus: Stenocercus
- Species: S. festae

Binomial name
- Stenocercus festae (Peracca, 1897)

Synonyms
- Leiocephalus festae Peracca, 1897; Ophryoessoides festae — J. Peters et al., 1970; Stenocercus festae — Fritts, 1974

= Stenocercus festae =

Species of lizard

Stenocercus festae, also known commonly as Peracca's whorltail iguana and Peracca's whorl-tailed iguana, is a species of lizard in the family Tropiduridae. The species is endemic to Ecuador.

== Etymology ==
The specific name, festae, is in honor of Italian zoologist Enrico Festa.

== Geographic range ==
S. festae is found in southern Ecuador, on both the eastern slope and the western slope of the Andes, in the provinces of Azuay, Cañar, and Loja.

== Habitat ==
The preferred natural habitats of S. festae are forest, and above the tree line shrubland, at altitudes of 2,300–3,200 m (7,500–10,500 ft).

== Description ==
S. festae may attain a snout-to-vent length (SVL) of 7.8 cm (3.1 in), with a tail length of 15 cm (5.9 in).

== Reproduction ==
S. festae is oviparous.
