= Stenocercus guentheri =

Conservation status
- Least Concern (IUCN 3.1)

Scientific classification
- Kingdom: Animalia
- Phylum: Chordata
- Class: Reptilia
- Order: Squamata
- Suborder: Iguania
- Family: Tropiduridae
- Genus: Stenocercus
- Species: S. guentheri

Binomial name
- Stenocercus guentheri (Boulenger, 1885)

Synonyms
- Liocephalus guentheri Boulenger, 1885; Ophryoessoides guentheri — Etheridge 1966; Stenocercus guentheri — Fritts, 1974

Species of lizard

Stenocercus guentheri, also known commonly as Günther's whorltail iguana and la guagsa de Günther in South American Spanish, is a species of lizard in the family Tropiduridae. The species is native to northwestern South America.

== Etymology ==
The specific name, guentheri, is in honor of German-British herpetologist Albert Günther.

== Geographic range ==
S. guentheri is found in Colombia and Ecuador.

== Habitat ==
The preferred natural habitat of S. guentheri is shrubland, at altitudes of 1,230–3,700 m (4,040–12,140 ft), but it has also been found in gardens, plantations, pastures, and urban areas.

== Reproduction ==
S. guentheri is oviparous, and may provide some parental care.
