= Stenocercus eunetopsis =

Conservation status
- Least Concern (IUCN 3.1)

Scientific classification
- Kingdom: Animalia
- Phylum: Chordata
- Class: Reptilia
- Order: Squamata
- Suborder: Iguania
- Family: Tropiduridae
- Genus: Stenocercus
- Species: S. eunetopsis

Binomial name
- Stenocercus eunetopsis Cadle, 1991

Species of lizard

Stenocercus eunetopsis is a species of lizard of the family Tropiduridae. It is found in Peru.
