= Stenocercus doellojuradoi =

Conservation status
- Near Threatened (IUCN 3.1)

Scientific classification
- Kingdom: Animalia
- Phylum: Chordata
- Class: Reptilia
- Order: Squamata
- Suborder: Iguania
- Family: Tropiduridae
- Genus: Stenocercus
- Species: S. doellojuradoi

Binomial name
- Stenocercus doellojuradoi (Freiberg, 1944)

Synonyms
- Proctotretus doellojuradoi Freiberg, 1944; Stenocercus doellojuradoi — Frost, 1992

Species of lizard

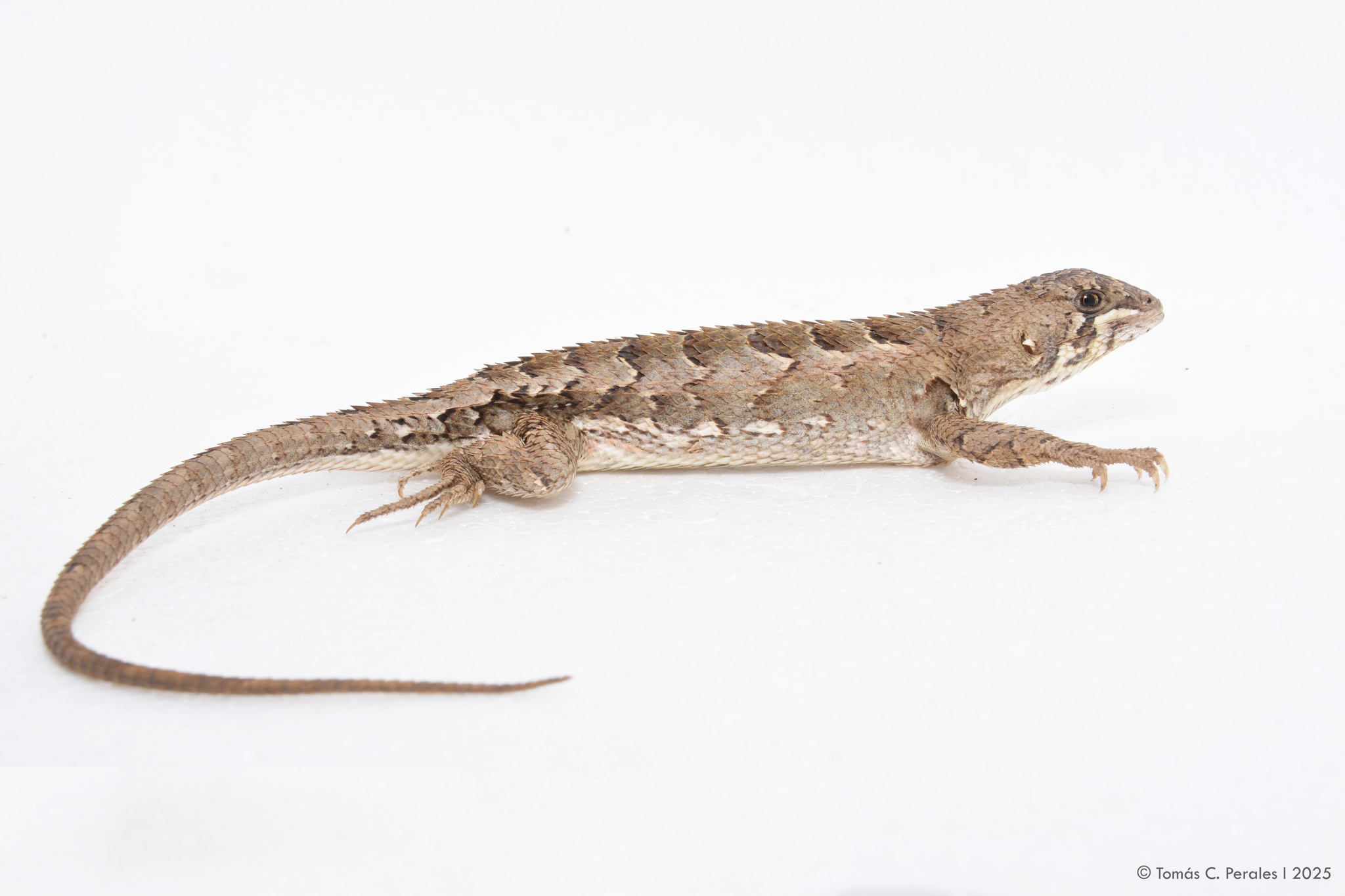
Stenocercus doellojuradoi, photographed in Argentina

Stenocercus doellojuradoi is a species of lizard in the family Tropiduridae. The species is native to southeastern South America.

== Etymology ==
The specific name, doellojuradoi, is in honor of Argentine zoologist Martín Doello-Jurado.

== Geographic range ==
S. doellojuradoi is found in Argentina and Paraguay.

== Habitat ==
The preferred natural habitats of S. doellojuradoi are forest and grassland, at altitudes of 100–1,000 m (330–3,280 ft).

== Reproduction ==
S. doellojuradoi is oviparous.
