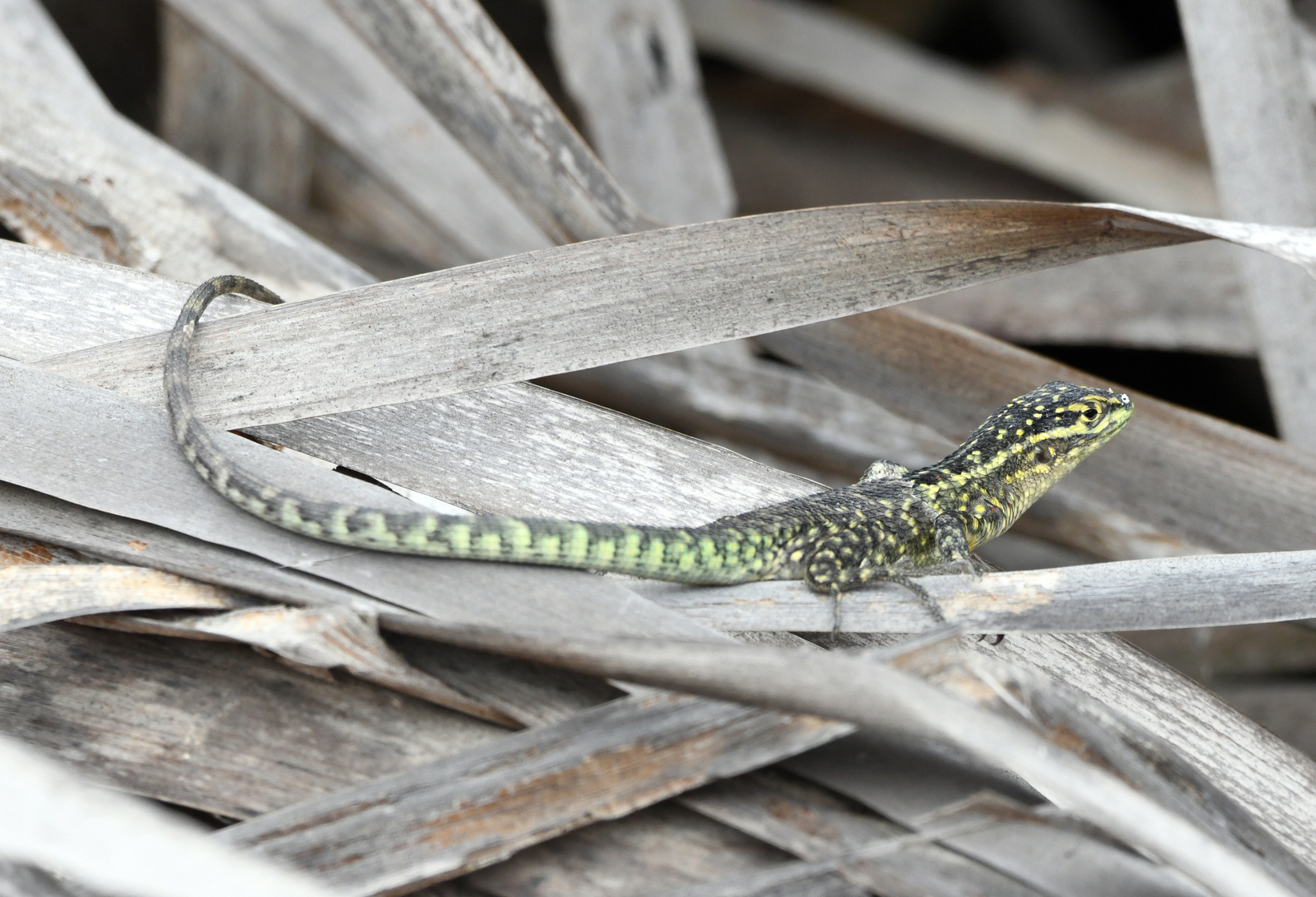

Conservation status
- Endangered (IUCN 3.1)

Scientific classification
- Kingdom: Animalia
- Phylum: Chordata
- Class: Reptilia
- Order: Squamata
- Suborder: Iguania
- Family: Tropiduridae
- Genus: Stenocercus
- Species: S. modestus

Binomial name
- Stenocercus modestus (Tschudi, 1845)

= Modest whorltail iguana =

Species of lizard

The modest whorltail iguana (Stenocercus modestus) is a species of lizard of the family Tropiduridae.

It is endemic to west-central Peru. It was first described by Johann Jakob von Tschudi in 1845.

The species is thought to have a highly fragmented and decreasing population, and is therefore rated as endangered by the IUCN. It lives in the coastal desert and has a diet consisting of arthropods.
