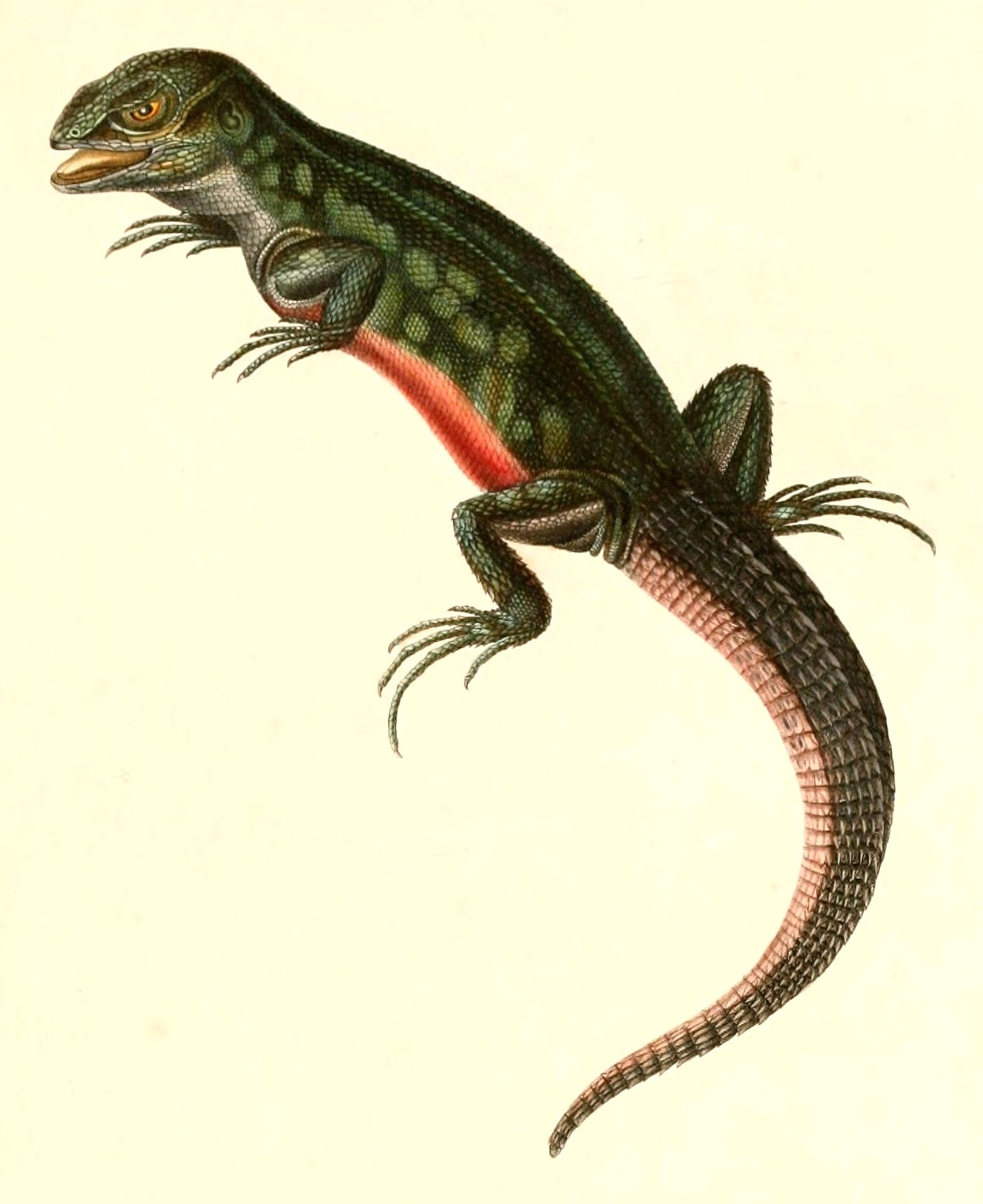

Conservation status
- Least Concern (IUCN 3.1)

Scientific classification
- Kingdom: Animalia
- Phylum: Chordata
- Class: Reptilia
- Order: Squamata
- Suborder: Iguania
- Family: Tropiduridae
- Genus: Stenocercus
- Species: S. roseiventris

Binomial name
- Stenocercus roseiventris d'Orbigny in A.M.C. Duméril & Bibron, 1837

= Stenocercus roseiventris =

Species of lizard

Stenocercus roseiventris, the rose whorltail iguana, is a species of lizard of the family Tropiduridae. It is found in Bolivia, Peru, Argentina, and Brazil.
