= Stenocercus chinchaoensis =

Conservation status
- Vulnerable (IUCN 3.1)

Scientific classification
- Kingdom: Animalia
- Phylum: Chordata
- Class: Reptilia
- Order: Squamata
- Suborder: Iguania
- Family: Tropiduridae
- Genus: Stenocercus
- Species: S. chinchaoensis

Binomial name
- Stenocercus chinchaoensis Venegas, Duran & Garcia-Burneo, 2013

Species of lizard

Stenocercus chinchaoensis, the Chinchao whorltail lizard, is a species of lizard of the family Tropiduridae. It is found in Peru.
