= Stenocercus nigrobarbatus =

Scientific classification
- Kingdom: Animalia
- Phylum: Chordata
- Class: Reptilia
- Order: Squamata
- Suborder: Iguania
- Family: Tropiduridae
- Genus: Stenocercus
- Species: S. nigrobarbatus

Binomial name
- Stenocercus nigrobarbatus Venegas, Echevarria, Garcia-Ayachi, & Landauro, 2020

Species of lizard

Stenocercus nigrobarbatus is a species of lizard of the family Tropiduridae. It is found in Peru.
