= Stenocercus limitaris =

Conservation status
- Vulnerable (IUCN 3.1)

Scientific classification
- Kingdom: Animalia
- Phylum: Chordata
- Class: Reptilia
- Order: Squamata
- Suborder: Iguania
- Family: Tropiduridae
- Genus: Stenocercus
- Species: S. limitaris

Binomial name
- Stenocercus limitaris Cadle, 1998

Species of lizard

Stenocercus limitaris is a species of lizard of the family Tropiduridae. It is found in Ecuador and Peru.
