= Stenocercus formosus =

Formosa whorltail iguana

Conservation status
- Data Deficient (IUCN 3.1)

Scientific classification
- Kingdom: Animalia
- Phylum: Chordata
- Class: Reptilia
- Order: Squamata
- Suborder: Iguania
- Family: Tropiduridae
- Genus: Stenocercus
- Species: S. formosus

Binomial name
- Stenocercus formosus (Tschudi, 1845)

Species of lizard

Stenocercus formosus, the Formosa whorltail iguana, is a species of lizard of the family Tropiduridae, found in Peru. It was first described by Johann Jakob von Tschudi in 1845.
