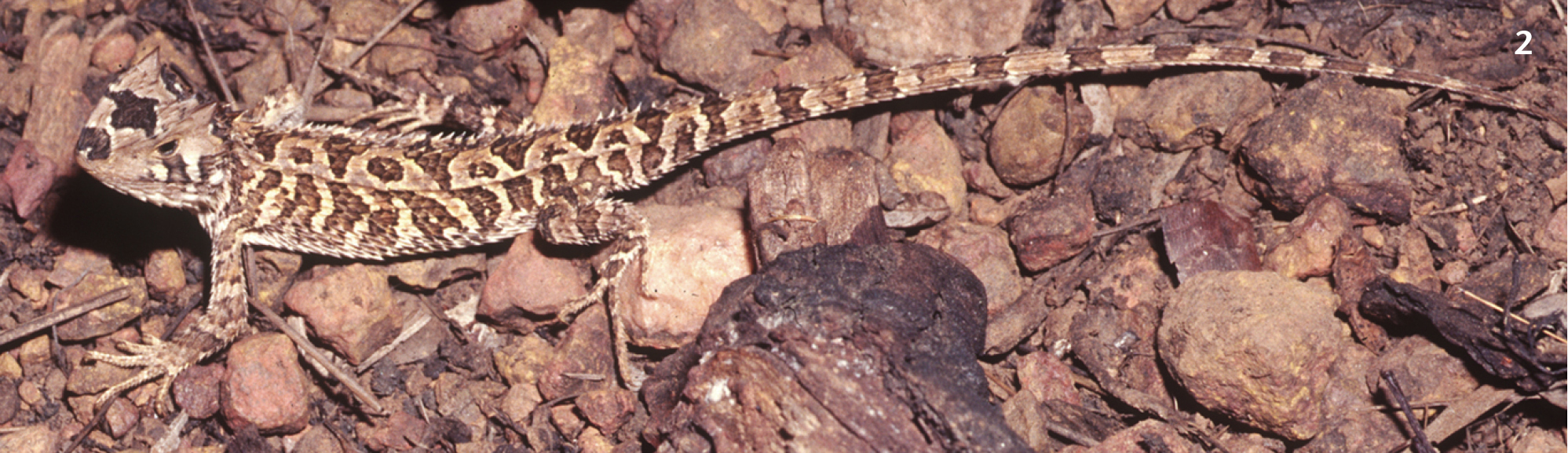

Scientific classification
- Kingdom: Animalia
- Phylum: Chordata
- Class: Reptilia
- Order: Squamata
- Suborder: Iguania
- Family: Tropiduridae
- Genus: Stenocercus
- Species: S. canastra

Binomial name
- Stenocercus canastra Ávila-Pires, Nogueira, & Martins, 2019

= Stenocercus canastra =

Species of lizard

Stenocercus canastra is a species of lizard of the family Tropiduridae. It is found in Brazil.
