= Stenocercus albolineatus =

Scientific classification
- Kingdom: Animalia
- Phylum: Chordata
- Class: Reptilia
- Order: Squamata
- Suborder: Iguania
- Family: Tropiduridae
- Genus: Stenocercus
- Species: S. albolineatus

Binomial name
- Stenocercus albolineatus Teixeira, Prates, Nisa, Silva-Martins, Strüssmann & Rodrigues, 2015

Species of lizard

Stenocercus albolineatus is a species of lizard of the family Tropiduridae. It is found in Brazil, Mato Grosso.
