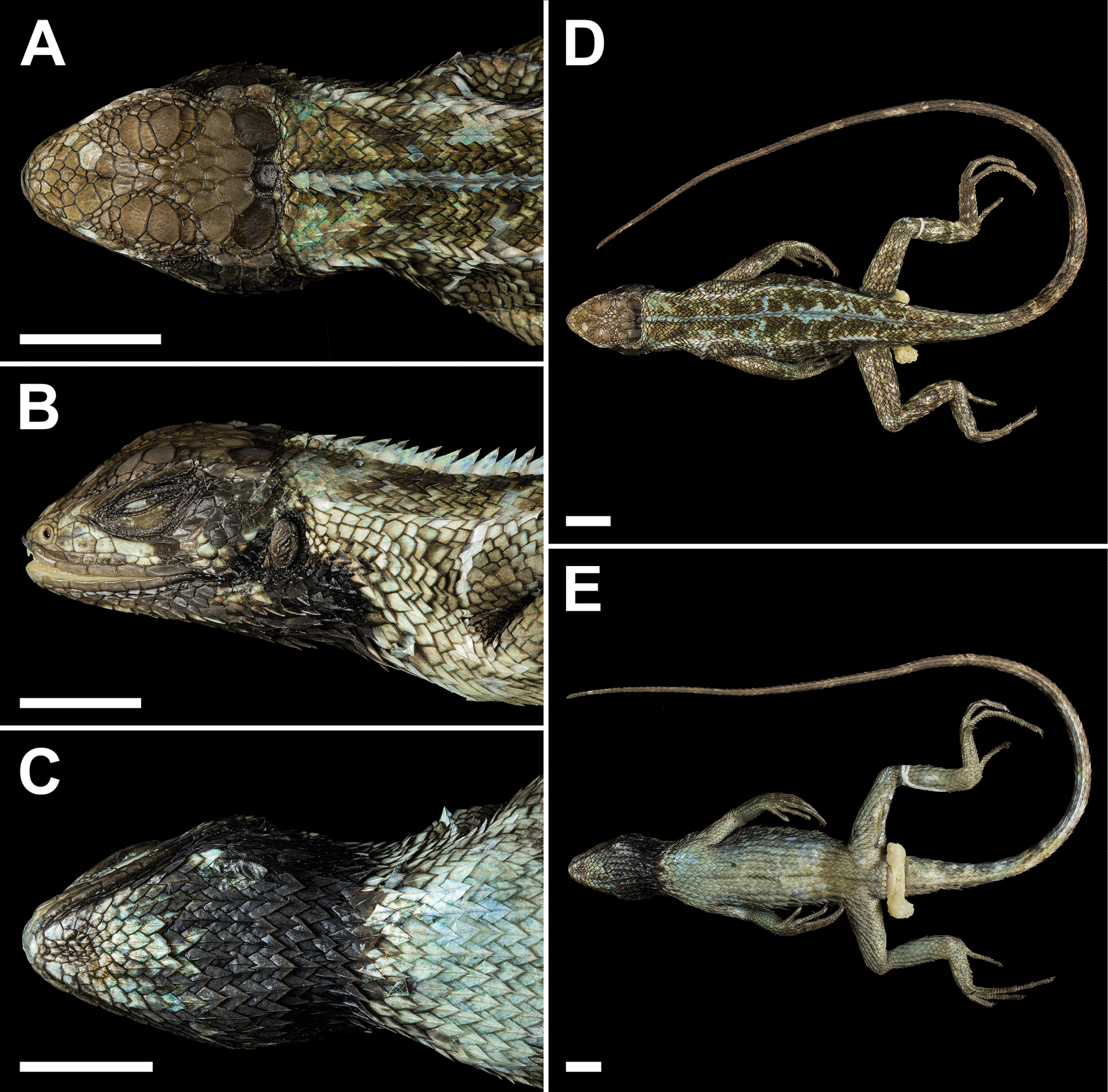

Conservation status
- Least Concern (IUCN 3.1)

Scientific classification
- Kingdom: Animalia
- Phylum: Chordata
- Class: Reptilia
- Order: Squamata
- Suborder: Iguania
- Family: Tropiduridae
- Genus: Stenocercus
- Species: S. aculeatus

Binomial name
- Stenocercus aculeatus (O'Shaughnessy, 1879)

Synonyms
- Leiocephalus aculeatus O'Shaughnessy, 1879; Ophryoessoides aculeatus — Etheridge, 1966; Stenocercus aculeatus — Torres-Carvajal, 2000

= Stenocercus aculeatus =

Species of lizard

Stenocercus aculeatus is a species of lizard in the family Tropiduridae. The species is native to northwestern South America.

== Geographic range ==
S. aculeatus is found in Bolivia, Ecuador, and Peru.

== Habitat ==
The preferred natural habitat of S. aculeatus is forest, at altitudes of 723–1,311 m (2,372–4,301 ft).

== Reproduction ==
S. aculeatus is oviparous.
