= Stenocercus nigromaculatus =

Conservation status
- Data Deficient (IUCN 3.1)

Scientific classification
- Kingdom: Animalia
- Phylum: Chordata
- Class: Reptilia
- Order: Squamata
- Suborder: Iguania
- Family: Tropiduridae
- Genus: Stenocercus
- Species: S. nigromaculatus

Binomial name
- Stenocercus nigromaculatus Noble, 1924

Species of lizard

Stenocercus nigromaculatus, the black-spotted whorltail iguana, is a species of lizard of the family Tropiduridae. It is found in Peru.
