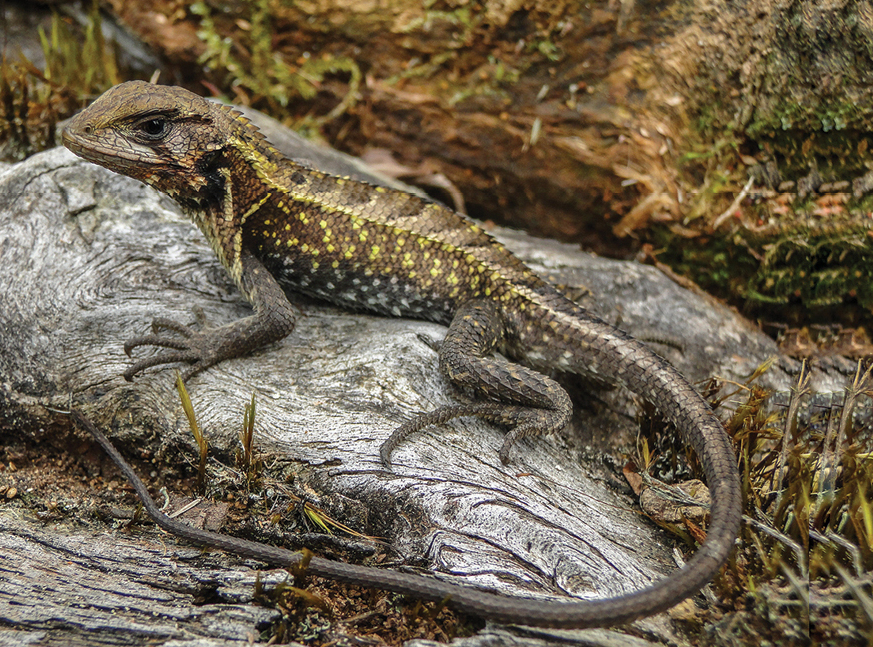

Scientific classification
- Kingdom: Animalia
- Phylum: Chordata
- Class: Reptilia
- Order: Squamata
- Suborder: Iguania
- Family: Tropiduridae
- Genus: Stenocercus
- Species: S. dracopennatus

Binomial name
- Stenocercus dracopennatus Venegas, García-Ayachi, Chávez-Arribasplata, Chávez, Wong & Garcia-Bravo, 2020

= Stenocercus dracopennatus =

Species of lizard

Stenocercus dracopennatus is a species of lizard of the family Tropiduridae. It is found in Peru.

== Taxonomy ==
Stenocercus dracopennatus was formally described in 2020 based on an adult male specimen collected from near Yambrasbamba in Yambrasbamba District in the Amazonas Department of Peru. The specific epithet dracopennatus means "dragon-feathered" in Latin, referring to the lizard's big scales, which give it the appearance of being covered by feathers.

== Description ==
The adult male holotype had a dusty brown dorsum with a greenish-yellow hue on the pelvic region and tail. The vertebral and dorsolateral crests are yellowish, with faint gray vertebral chevrons on the back that have yellowish posterior margins. The antehumeral region has a dark brown vertical stripe with a yellowish anterior margin. The flanks have diagonal rows of yellowish dots. The limbs and proximal half of the tail have transverse yellowish stripes. The ventrolateral region is turquoise, the sides of head are sepia, and the ocular region is black. Ventrally, the gular region is sepia and the ventral surface of the neck is covered by a black patch. The chest, pelvic region, ventral surface of the hindlimbs, and the base of tail are dirty cream. The sides of belly are turquoise. The proximal half of the tail is also dirty cream with transverse paler bands. The iris is dark brown. Other males are larger and paler than the holotype.

Juvenile male specimens have a cinnamon dorsum and more contrasting vertebral chevrons than the holotype. There is a dark brown stripe extending anterodorsally from the subocular region to the supraciliaries. There are yellow dots on the flanks and whitish dots on the axillary region. There is no turquoise hue. Ventrally, the gular region is dark sepia and the rest of body is whitish-cream, with the dark gray sides to the belly, unlike the turquoise sides of the adult.

== Distribution and habitat ==
Stenocercus dracopennatus is only known from the type locality, a summit near Yambrasbamba village at an elevation of 2370 m, located on the eastern slope of the Cordillera de Colán, in the Río Chiriaco basin. The locality is a mountain top covered by a dwarf montane forest, full of terrestrial and arboreal bromeliads, growing on white sandy soil. This species occurs within the Peruvian Yungas. These lizards have been observed basking on sunny mornings on sand and fallen branches, and running to find refuge in patches of terrestrial bromeliads and long grasses.
