= S. ornatus =

S. ornatus may refer to:

- Scotomanes ornatus, the harlequin bat, a vesper bat species
- Sorex ornatus, the ornate shrew, a mammal species
- Spizaetus ornatus, the ornate hawk-eagle, a bird of prey species
- Stenocercus ornatus, is a species of lizard of the Tropiduridae family

== See also ==
- Ornatus
