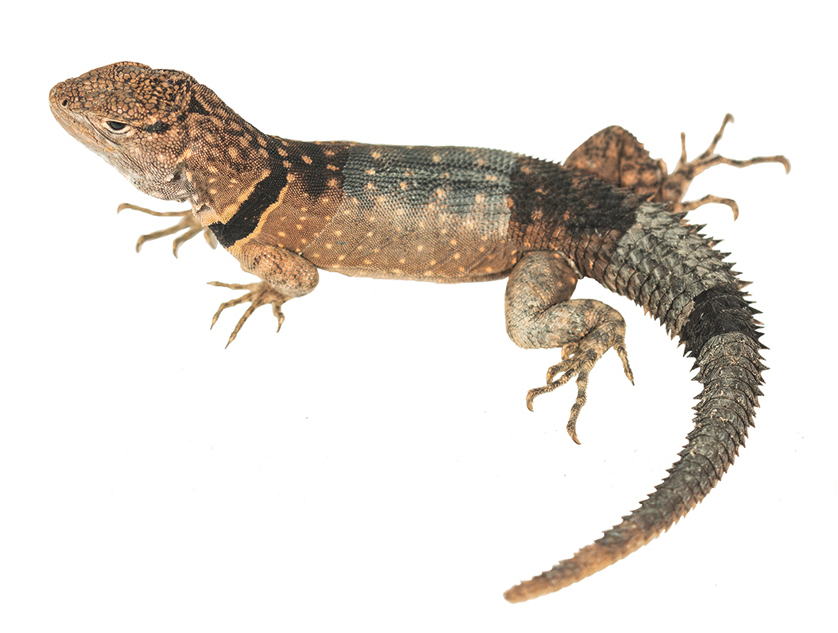

Scientific classification
- Kingdom: Animalia
- Phylum: Chordata
- Class: Reptilia
- Order: Squamata
- Suborder: Iguania
- Family: Tropiduridae
- Genus: Stenocercus
- Species: S. flagracanthus

Binomial name
- Stenocercus flagracanthus Venegas, Garcia-Ayachi, Chávez-Arribasplata, Chávez, Wong & Garcia-Bravo, 2020

= Stenocercus flagracanthus =

Species of lizard

Stenocercus flagracanthus is a species of lizard of the family Tropiduridae. Formally described in 2020, it is named after its tail's resemblance to the flagrum, an ancient Roman torture tool. Endemic to Peru, it is only known from the Amazonian slope of the extreme northern portion of the central Andes in the Río Utcubamba basin. Its habitat lies within agricultural lands with a mixture of corn, fruit trees, coffee plantations, and pastures.

== Taxonomy ==
Stenocercus flagracanthus was formally described in 2020 based on an adult male specimen collected from near Cuispes village in Cuispes District in the Amazonas Department of Peru. The specific epithet is derived from the Latin word flagrum, meaning whip, and the Greek word acanthos, meaning spine. It refers to the lizard's spiny tail, which resembles a flagrum, an ancient Roman torture tool.

== Description ==
The adult male holotype had a pale brown dorsum spattered with dirty cream dots. There is a distinct black collar with dirty cream borders and broad black stripes without pale interspaces along the dorsum. The neck and limbs are finely blotched with black and there is a middorsal triangular black blotch posterior to the occiput. The dorsal surface of the head has black flecks. The side of the head is gray and the supralabials and temporal region are pale brown, with a postocular black stripe. The tail is black with a brown distal quarter. The ventral surface is creamy-gray, while the gular region is gray with faint cream blotches. The distal surface of the tail is half gray. This iris is pale brown.

Female are smaller than males. The collar is gray and the dorsum is grayish-brown. The dorsal marks are faint gray along the back and black on the pelvic region and tail. The single juvenile specimen has a gray dorsum and a well-defined dark gray collar, but lacks transverse black stripes and dorsal surface of head brown.

== Distribution and habitat ==
Stenocercus flagracanthus is only known from two localities, Cuispes village and Canta Gallo, both on the Amazonian slope of the extreme northern portion of the central Andes in the Río Utcubamba basin, at elevations of 1720 and 1880 m. It inhabits the Peruvian Yungas ecoregion. Its habitat lies within agricultural lands with a mixture of corn, fruit trees, coffee plantations, and pastures. Individuals have been observed basking on house walls, roofs, rocky fences, and piles of firewood, using crevices as retreats.
