= Stenocercus caducus =

Conservation status
- Least Concern (IUCN 3.1)

Scientific classification
- Kingdom: Animalia
- Phylum: Chordata
- Class: Reptilia
- Order: Squamata
- Suborder: Iguania
- Family: Tropiduridae
- Genus: Stenocercus
- Species: S. caducus

Binomial name
- Stenocercus caducus (Cope, 1862)

Species of lizard

Stenocercus caducus is a species of lizard of the family Tropiduridae. It is found in Bolivia, Brazil, Paraguay, and Argentina.
