= Stenocercus huancabambae =

Conservation status
- Least Concern (IUCN 3.1)

Scientific classification
- Kingdom: Animalia
- Phylum: Chordata
- Class: Reptilia
- Order: Squamata
- Suborder: Iguania
- Family: Tropiduridae
- Genus: Stenocercus
- Species: S. huancabambae

Binomial name
- Stenocercus huancabambae Cadle, 1991

Species of lizard

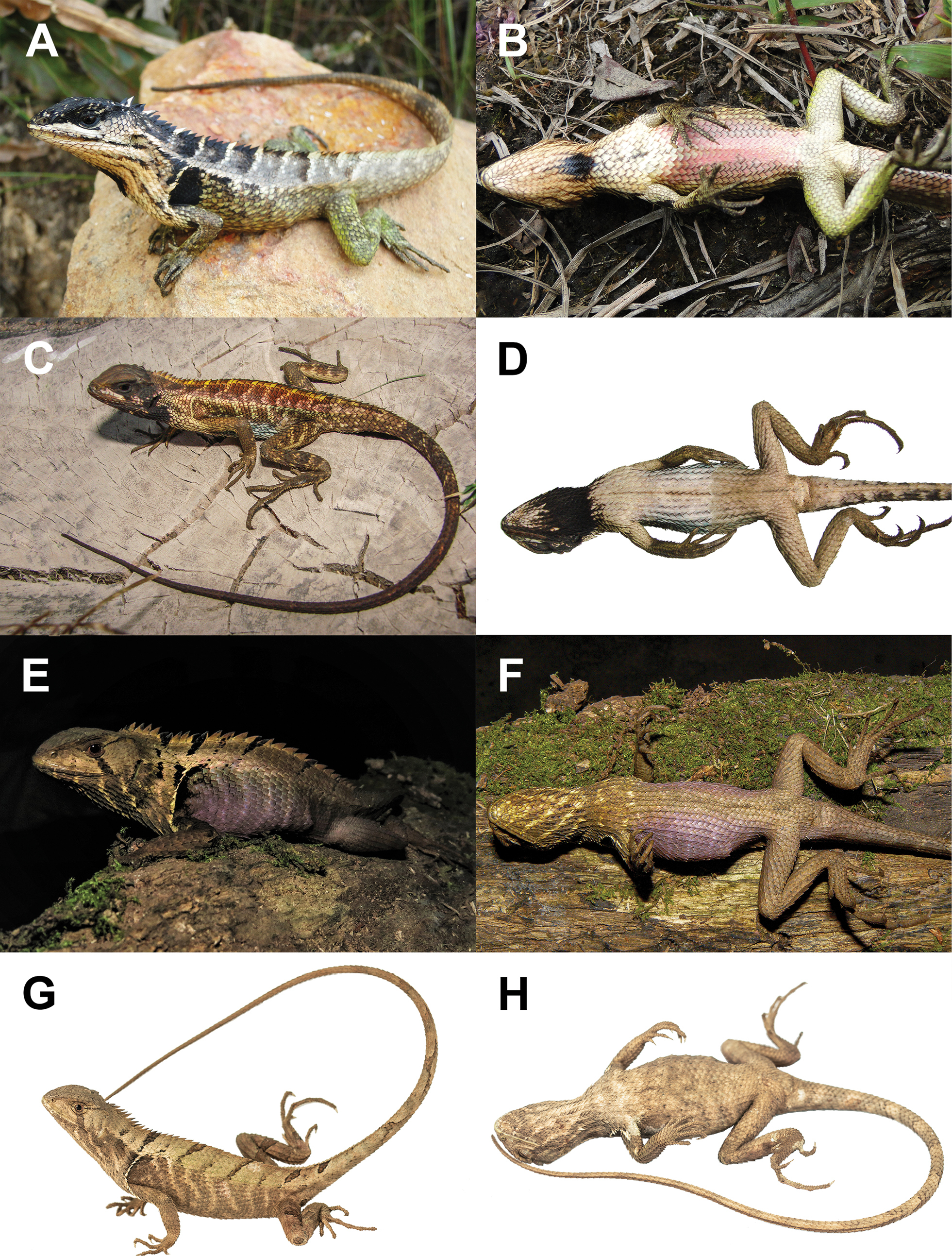
Different species of Stenocerus (S. huancabambae in the top row)

Stenocercus huancabambae is a species of lizard of the family Tropiduridae. It is found in Peru.
