= Stenocercus azureus =

Conservation status
- Least Concern (IUCN 3.1)

Scientific classification
- Kingdom: Animalia
- Phylum: Chordata
- Class: Reptilia
- Order: Squamata
- Suborder: Iguania
- Family: Tropiduridae
- Genus: Stenocercus
- Species: S. azureus

Binomial name
- Stenocercus azureus (Müller, 1880)

Species of lizard

Stenocercus azureus is a species of lizard of the family Tropiduridae. It is found in Uruguay, Brazil, and Argentina.
