= Golden whorltail iguana =

Conservation status
- Least Concern (IUCN 3.1)

Scientific classification
- Kingdom: Animalia
- Phylum: Chordata
- Class: Reptilia
- Order: Squamata
- Suborder: Iguania
- Family: Tropiduridae
- Genus: Stenocercus
- Species: S. chrysopygus

Binomial name
- Stenocercus chrysopygus Boulenger, 1900

Species of lizard

The golden whorltail iguana (Stenocercus chrysopygus) is a species of lizard of the family Tropiduridae.

It is endemic to western Peru, where it inhabits the puna grassland.
