= Stenocercus quinarius =

Conservation status
- Least Concern (IUCN 3.1)

Scientific classification
- Kingdom: Animalia
- Phylum: Chordata
- Class: Reptilia
- Order: Squamata
- Suborder: Iguania
- Family: Tropiduridae
- Genus: Stenocercus
- Species: S. quinarius

Binomial name
- Stenocercus quinarius Nogueira & Rodrigues, 2006

Species of lizard

Stenocercus quinarius is a lizard found in Brazil.
