= Stenocercus angulifer =

Conservation status
- Near Threatened (IUCN 3.1)

Scientific classification
- Kingdom: Animalia
- Phylum: Chordata
- Class: Reptilia
- Order: Squamata
- Suborder: Iguania
- Family: Tropiduridae
- Genus: Stenocercus
- Species: S. angulifer

Binomial name
- Stenocercus angulifer (Werner, 1901)

Species of lizard

Stenocercus angulifer is a species of lizard of the family Tropiduridae. It is found in Ecuador.
