= André Marie Constant Duméril =

French zoologist (1774–1860)

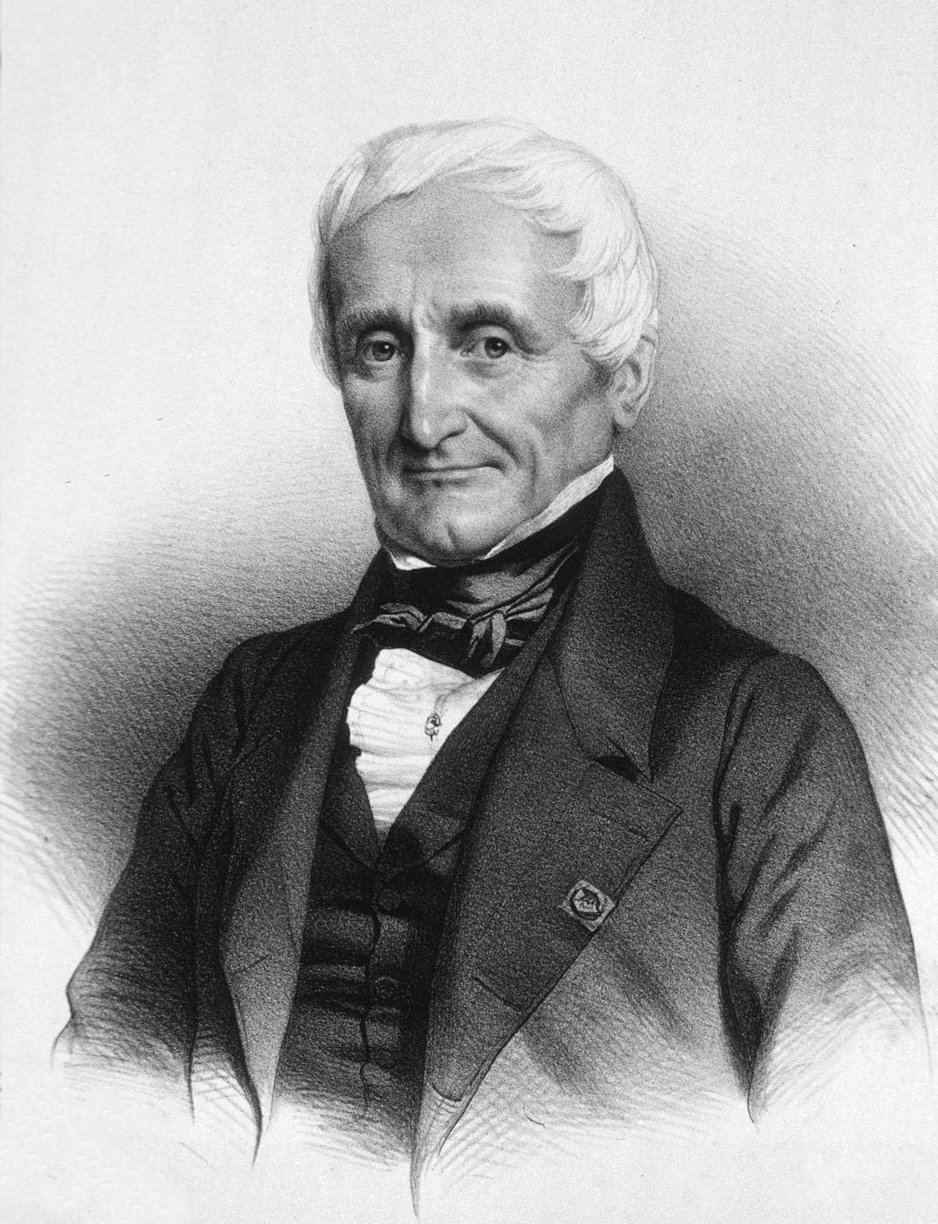
- Born: 1 January 1774; Amiens, Kingdom of France
- Died: 14 August 1860 (aged 86); Paris, France
- Education: University of Rouen
- Known for: Zoologie analytique
- Children: Auguste Duméril
- Awards: Commander of the Légion d'Honneur
- Scientific career
- Fields: Zoology
- Workplaces: Muséum national d'histoire naturelle
- Author abbrev. (zoology): Duméril

André Marie Constant Duméril (French: [ɑ̃dʁe maʁi kɔ̃stɑ̃ dymeʁil]; 1 January 1774 – 14 August 1860) was a French zoologist. He was professor of anatomy at the Muséum national d'histoire naturelle from 1801 to 1812, when he became professor of herpetology and ichthyology. His son Auguste Duméril was also a zoologist, and the author citation Duméril is used for both André and his son.

== Life ==
André Marie Constant Duméril was born on 1 January 1774 in Amiens and died in Paris on 14 August 1860.

He became a doctor at a young age, obtaining, when only 19, the prévot of anatomy at the medical school of Rouen. In 1800, he left for Paris and collaborated in the drafting of the comparative anatomy lessons of Georges Cuvier.

He replaced Cuvier at the Central School of the Panthéon and had, as his colleague, Alexandre Brongniart. In 1801, he taught at the Paris medical school. After the Restauration, he was elected a member of the Académie des Sciences (French Academy of Sciences) and, in 1803, succeeded Lacépède, who was occupied by his political offices, as professor of herpetology and ichthyology at the Muséum national d'histoire naturelle. Duméril only officially received that chair in 1825, after the death of Lacépède.

In 1806, he published his Zoologie analytique, which covered the whole of the animal kingdom and showed the relations between genera as then distinguished, but not among species. He was elected a member of the American Philosophical Society in Philadelphia in 1813. In 1832, Gabriel Bibron (1806–1848), who became his assistant, was given the task of describing the species for an expanded version of Zoologie analytique, while Nicolaus Michael Oppel (1782–1820) assisted him with a revised higher-order systematics. After Bibron's death, he was replaced by Auguste Duméril, André's son, but the death delayed the publication of the new work for 10 years. In 1851, the two Dumérils, father and son, published the Catalogue méthodique de la collection des reptiles (although Auguste was apparently the true author) and, in 1853, André Duméril alone published Prodrome de la classification des reptiles ophidiens. That last book proposes a classification of all the snakes in seven volumes.

Duméril, upon discovering a case of preserved fish in the attic of the house of Georges-Louis Leclerc, Comte de Buffon, finally described the species that had been collected by Philibert Commerson nearly 70 years earlier.

He then published a very important work, l’Erpétologie générale ou Histoire naturelle complète des reptiles (nine volumes, 1834–1854). In this, 1,393 species are described in detail and their anatomy, physiology, and bibliography are specified. However, Duméril maintained the amphibians among the reptiles in spite of the work of Alexandre Brongniart or Pierre André Latreille or the anatomical discoveries of Karl Ernst von Baer (1792–1876) and Johannes Peter Müller (1801–1858).

Throughout his life he was interested in insects and published several volumes on entomology. His principal entomological work is Entomologie analytique (1860, two volumes). With his son Auguste, also a zoologist, he created the first vivarium for reptiles in the Jardin des Plantes. Duméril always considered observations on animal behaviour of taxonomic significance.

After 1853, he began to cede his position to his son and he retired completely in 1857. He was made a commander of the Legion of Honour two months before his death.

== Species named after Duméril ==
- The worm Platynereis dumerilii Audouin & H. Milne-Edwards, 1834
- The Greater Amberjack fish Seriola dumerili Risso, 1810
- The bryozoan, Callopora dumerilii Audouin & in de Savigny, 1826
- The moth Luperina dumerilii Duponchel, 1826
- The isopod Rocinela dumerilii Lucas, 1849
- The aquatic isopod crustacean Sphaeroma dumerilii Leach, 1818
- The Filefish Cantherhines dumerilii Hollard, 1854
- The Lizard Acanthodactylus dumerilii (H. Milne-Edwards, 1829)
- The Boa Snake Acrantophis dumerili Jan in Jan & Sordelli, 1860
- The wolf snake Lycodon dumerili (Boulenger, 1893)
- The coral snake Micrurus dumerilii (Jan 1858)
- The Amazon River Turtle Peltocephalus dumerilianus (Schweigger, 1812)
- The lizard Stenocercus dumerilii (Steindachner, 1867)
- The Snake Urotheca dumerilii (Bibron, 1840)
- The Monitor Lizard Varanus dumerilii (Schlegel, 1839)

== See also ==
- Gabriel Bibron
- Auguste Duméril
