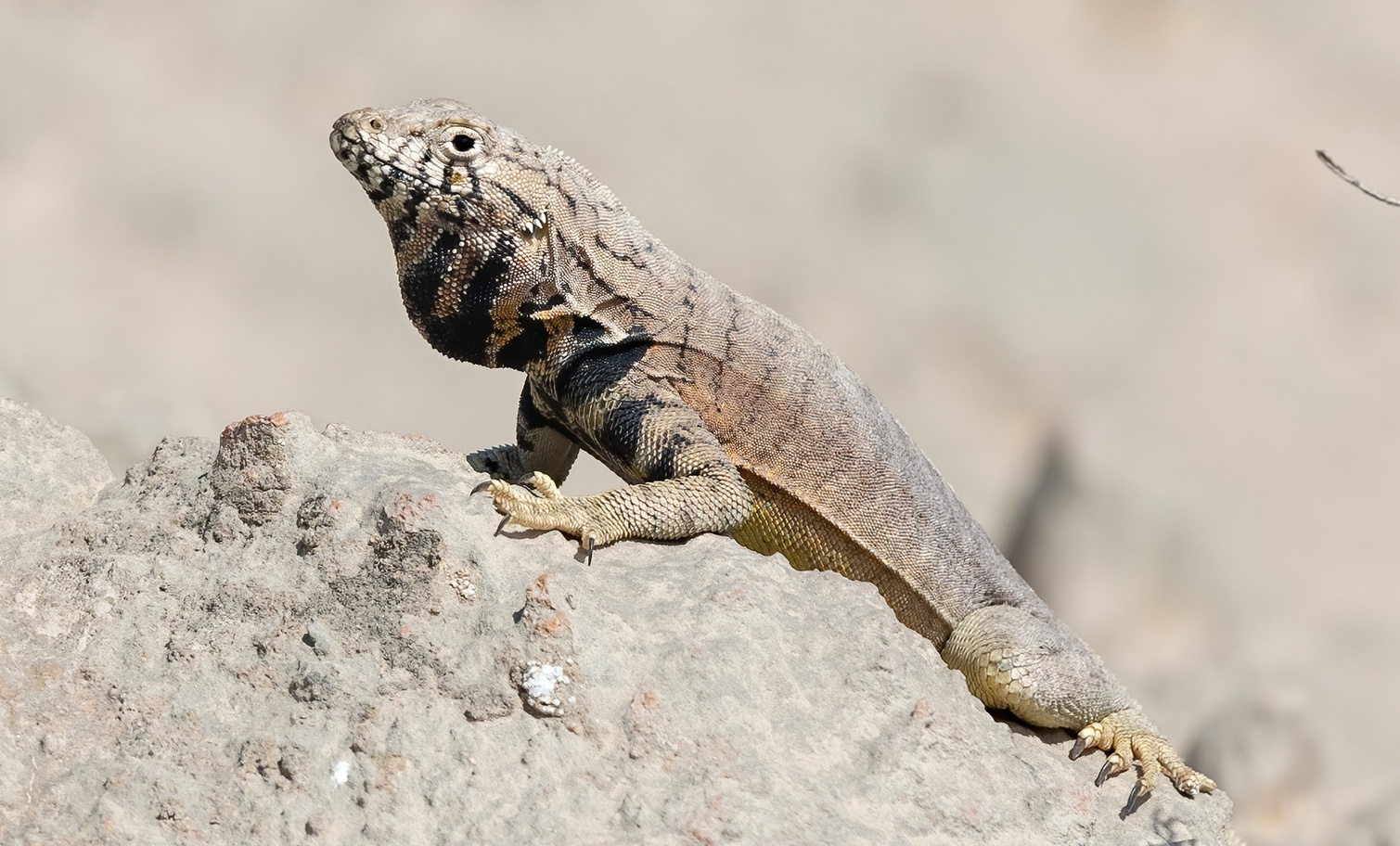
- Microlophus peruvianus

Scientific classification
- Kingdom: Animalia
- Phylum: Chordata
- Class: Reptilia
- Order: Squamata
- Suborder: Iguania
- Infraorder: Pleurodonta
- Family: Tropiduridae; Bell, 1843

Genera
- 8, see text

= Tropiduridae =

Family of lizards

The Tropiduridae are a family of iguanian lizards. The family is native to South America, including the islands of Trinidad and the Galápagos. Commonly known as Neotropical ground lizards, most are ground-dwelling animals, and the subfamily includes some lizards adapted to relatively cold climates, including those of the Andes mountains and Tierra del Fuego. Several species give birth to live young.

A 2021 study described a novel escutcheon-type generation gland ('α-gland') in tropidurines, found in at least 39 species. This gland is believed to be the main potential source of semiochemicals in this group indicating its importance in chemical signalling, an essential component of the communication system of lizards.

== Genera ==
The family Tropiduridae contains the following eight genera.

- Eurolophosaurus Frost, Rodrigues, T. Grant & Titus, 2001
- Microlophus A.M.C. Duméril & Bibron, 1837 – lava lizards and Pacific iguanas (sometimes in Tropidurus)
- Plica Gray, 1830
- Stenocercus A.M.C. Duméril & Bibron, 1837 – whorltail iguanas
- Strobilurus Wiegmann, 1834
- Tropidurus Wied-Neuwied, 1824 (including Platynotus, Tapinurus)
- Uracentron Kaup, 1827 – thornytail iguanas (sometimes in Tropidurus)
- Uranoscodon Kaup, 1825
