= List of herpetologists =

This is a list of herpetologists who are discussed in Wikipedia articles, in alphabetical order by surname. Some articles are from non-English versions of Wikipedia.

== By surname ==
=== A ===
- Kraig Kerr Adler
- Leticia E. Afuang
- Louis Agassiz
- César Augusto Aguilar Puntriano
- Ernst Ahl
- Angel Chua Alcala
- Alfred William Alcock
- Ulisse Aldrovandi
- Ross Allen (1908–1981)
- Allen Allison
- Antenor Álvarez (1864–1948)
- Ticul Álvarez (1935–2001)
- Miguel Álvarez del Toro (1917–1996)
- Afrânio Pompílio Gastos do Amaral
- Jean-Louis Amiet
- James D. Anderson (1930–1976)
- John Anderson (1833–1900)
- Lars Gabriel Andersson
- Claes Andrén
- Franco Andreone
- Fernand Angel
- Nelson Annandale
- Michel Ansermet
- Kenneth Peter Aplin
- María Cristina Ardila-Robayo
- Edwin Nicholas Arnold
- Alejandro Arteaga
- Jean Victor Audouin
- Walter Auffenberg
- Luciano Javier Ávila
- José Ayarzagüena

=== B ===
- Sherif Baha El Din (born 1960)
- Joseph Randle Bailey
- Raoul Harley Bain
- Spencer Fullerton Baird
- Danilo S. Balete
- İbrahim Baran
- Robert Barbault (1943–2013)
- Roger W. Barbour (1919–1993)
- Thomas Barbour (1884–1946)
- David G. Barker
- Tracy M. Barker
- Brady Barr
- Avelino Barrio
- César Luis Barrio-Amorós
- Edward Bartlett
- Muhtar Başoğlu
- Aaron Matthew Bauer
- Georg Baur
- Arthur René Jean Baptiste Bavay
- Johann Matthäus Bechstein
- Richard Henry Beddome
- Jacques von Bedriaga
- John L. Behler
- Thomas Bell
- Angus d'Albini Bellairs
- Edward Turner Bennett
- Carlos Berg (1843–1902)
- Leszek Berger (1925–2012)
- Arnold Adolph Berthold
- Subramanian Bhupathy
- Giovanni Giuseppe Bianconi
- Gabriel Bibron
- Sathyabhama Das Biju
- Sherman C. Bishop
- Henri Marie Ducrotay de Blainville
- W. Frank Blair
- Frank N. Blanchard
- William Thomas Blanford
- Pieter Bleeker
- Rose Marie Antoinette Blommers-Schlösser
- Johann Friedrich Blumenbach
- Edward Blyth
- José Vicente Barbosa du Bocage
- Marie Firmin Bocourt
- Oskar Boettger
- Charles Mitchill Bogert
- Wolfgang Böhme
- Friedrich Boie (1784–1827)
- Heinrich Boie (1789–1870)
- Ludwig Heinrich Bojanus
- Werner Bokermann
- Charles Lucien Bonaparte
- Pierre Joseph Bonnaterre
- Alice Middleton Boring
- Achim-Rüdiger Börner
- Jean Baptiste Bory de Saint-Vincent
- Louis Augustin Guillaume Bosc
- Eduardo Boscá
- Hilbrand Boschma
- Franky Bossuyt
- Paul-Émile Botta
- Edward George Boulenger (1888–1946)
- George Albert Boulenger (1858–1937)
- Roger Bour
- René Léon Bourret
- Arden H. Brame
- William Roy Branch
- Ronald A. Brandon
- Johann Friedrich von Brandt
- Peter Brazaitis
- Vital Brazil
- Clement Samuel Brimley
- Donald George Broadley
- Paul Brocchi
- Edmund Darrell Brodie Jr.
- Edmund Darrell Brodie III
- Leo Brongersma
- Alexandre Brongniart
- Robert Broom
- Arthur Erwin Brown (1850–1910)
- Rafe Marion Brown
- Walter Creighton Brown (1913–2002)
- Édouard-Raoul Brygoo
- Reinhold Wilhelm Buchholz
- Abidin Budak
- Walter Buller
- Frank T. Burbrink
- Ivan Buresh
- Hermann Burmeister
- Edward Burton
- R. Bruce Bury

=== C ===
- Enrica Calabresi
- Janalee P. Caldwell
- Teresa Camacho Badani
- Lorenzo Camerano
- Charles Lewis Camp
- Jonathan A. Campbell
- David C. Cannatella
- George Cansdale
- Theodore Edward Cantor
- Ashok Captain
- Ulisses Caramaschi
- Charles Congden Carpenter
- Nelly Carrillo Tarazona de Espinoza
- Héctor Charry Restrepo
- Archie Carr
- Antenor Leitão de Carvalho
- Alessandro Catenazzi
- José Miguel Alfredo María Cei
- Paul Chabanaud
- Chan Eng Heng
- Alan Channing
- Sergius Aleksandrovich Chernov or Sergueï Tchernov
- George E. Children
- Laurent Chirio
- Alexandre Constantinovich Chnéour
- Diego F. Cisneros-Heredia
- Doris Mable Cochran
- Jean-Théodore Cocteau
- Harold Cogger
- Joseph T. Collins
- Luis Aurelio Coloma
- Roger Conant (1909–2003)
- Werner Conradie
- James Graham Cooper
- Edward Drinker Cope
- Emilio Cornalia
- Jeff Corwin
- Hugh B. Cott
- Patrick J. Couper
- Jeanette Covacevich
- Albert John Coventry
- Raymond Bridgman Cowles
- Carlos Alberto Gonçalves da Cruz
- Osvaldo Rodrigues da Cunha
- Georges Cuvier
- Otto Cyrén

=== D ===
- Serge Daan
- John William Daly
- J.C. Daniel
- Ilya Darevsky
- Indraneil Das
- Shekar Dattatri
- François Marie Daudin
- Margaret M. Davies
- Delbert Dwight Davis
- Edoardo Francesco De Betta
- Filippo De Filippi
- James Ellsworth De Kay
- Ignacio J. De la Riva
- Thales de Lema
- Olivér György Dely
- Kevin de Queiroz
- Paulus Edward Pieris Deraniyagala
- Anslem de Silva
- Julien François Desjardins
- Herbert C. Dessauer
- Charles Walter De Vis
- Gaston-François de Witte
- Tomas Diagne
- Luis Manuel Díaz
- Marcos Di-Bernardo
- Mary Cynthia Dickerson
- Arvin Cantor Diesmos
- Raymond Ditmars (1876–1942)
- James R. Dixon
- C. Kenneth Dodd, Jr.
- Louis Dollo
- Charles Domergue (1914–2008)
- Steve Donnellan
- Maureen Ann Donnelly
- Roberto Donoso-Barros
- Alcide d'Orbigny
- Giacomo Doria
- Paul Doughty
- François Doumergue (1858–1938)
- Herndon Dowling (1921–2015)
- Louis du Preez
- Alain Dubois
- William Edward Duellman
- James Edwin Duerden
- Alfredo Dugès
- André Marie Constant Duméril (1774–1860)
- Auguste Duméril (1812–1870)
- Emmett Reid Dunn

=== E ===
- Karl Eichwald
- Josef Eiselt
- Martin Eisentraut
- Carl H. Ernst
- Johann Friedrich von Eschscholtz
- Alberto R. Estrada
- Susan E. Evans
- Eduard Friedrich Eversmann
- Joseph Fortuné Théodore Eydoux

=== F ===
- Soumia Fahd
- Julián Faivovich
- Albert-Auguste Fauvel
- Fei Liang
- Géza Fejérváry (naturalist)
- Harold S. Ferguson (1851–1921)
- William Ferguson (1820–1887)
- Adam Finell (herpetologist) (2004-)
- Frank Finn
- Johann Gustav Fischer
- Henry Sheldon Fitch
- Ernst Josef Fittkau
- Lee Fitzgerald
- Leopold Fitzinger
- Frederick William FitzSimons (1870–1951)
- Vivian Frederick Maynard FitzSimons (1901–1975)
- Lothar Forcart
- Juan Ramón Formas
- Peter Forsskål (or Forskål)
- Antoine Fouquet
- Henry Weed Fowler
- Wade Fox
- Marcos Abraham Freiberg
- Uwe Fritz
- Charles Frost (1853?–1915)
- Darrel R. Frost (born 1951)
- Ion Eduard Fuhn

=== G ===
- Hans Friedrich Gadow
- Giussepe Gagliardi-Urrutia
- Frederick McMahon Gaige
- Helen Beulah Thompson Gaige
- Joseph Paul Gaimard
- José María Alfonso Félix Gallardo
- Carl Gans
- Paulo Christiano de Anchietta Garcia
- Alexander Garden
- Theodore Garland, Jr.
- Samuel Garman
- Orlando H. Garrido
- Maren Gaulke
- Giuseppe Gené
- Étienne Geoffroy Saint-Hilaire (1772–1844)
- Isidore Geoffroy Saint-Hilaire (1805–1861)
- Paul Gervais
- Gian Maria Ghidini
- Ariovaldo Antônio Giaretta
- J. Whitfield Gibbons
- Enrico Hillyer Giglioli
- Charles Frédéric Girard
- Johannes von Nepomuk Franz Xaver Gistel
- Ludwig Glauert
- Frank Glaw
- Howard K. Gloyd
- Johann Friedrich Gmelin
- Bayram Göçmen
- Coleman Jett Goin
- Philip Henry Gosse
- David J. Gower
- Alfred Grandidier
- Chapman Grant (1887–1983)
- Taran Grant (born ca. 1976)
- Johann Ludwig Christian Gravenhorst
- John Edward Gray
- Jacob Green (1790–1841)
- Harry W. Greene
- Allen Eddy Greer
- Jesse Leland Grismer (born 1983)
- Larry Lee Grismer (born 1955)
- Arnold B. Grobman
- Juan Manuel Guayasamin
- Jean Marius René Guibé
- Alphonse Guichenot
- Juan Gundlach
- Albert Günther (1830–1914)
- Rainer Günther (born 1941)

=== H ===
- Alexander Haas (born 1964)
- Georg Haas (1905–1981)
- Bill Haast (1910–2011)
- Célio Fernando Baptista Haddad
- Edward Hallowell
- Karl Richard Hanitsch
- James Hanken
- Thomas Hardwicke
- Kenan Harkin
- Richard Harlan
- Norman Edouard Hartweg
- Oliver Perry Hay (1846–1930)
- William Perry Hay (1871–1947)
- Stephen Blair Hedges
- Heini Hediger
- Matthew Paul Heinicke
- Edmund Heller
- Walter Hellmich (herpetologist)
- Wilhelm Hemprich
- Willi Hennig
- Johann Hermann (or Herrmann) (1738–1800)
- John Hewitt (1880–1961)
- Carl Heinrich Georg von Heyden
- W. Ronald Heyer
- Richard Highton
- Tsutomu Hikida
- David Hillis
- Richard L. Hoffman
- Robert Hoffstetter
- Alphonse Richard Hoge
- John Hogg
- John Edwards Holbrook
- J. Alan Holman
- Jacques Bernard Hombron
- Marinus Steven Hoogmoed
- Raymond Hoser
- Martinus Houttuyn (or Maarten Houttuyn or Houttuijn)
- Hu Shuqin (or Shu-Qin Hu)
- Yong-zhao Huang
- Ambrosius Hubrecht
- Raymond B. Huey
- Frederick Hutton

=== I ===
- Rodolpho von Ihering
- Robert F. Inger
- Glen Joseph Ingram
- Bob Irwin (born 1939)
- Steve Irwin (1962–2006)
- Djoko Tjahjono Iskandar
- Eugênio Izecksohn (1932–2013)
- Constantine John Philip Ionides (1901-1968)

=== J ===
- Kate Jackson
- Honoré Jacquinot
- Giorgio Jan
- Kittipong Jaruthanin
- Thomas C. Jerdon
- Ulrich Joger
- Ronald Eric Johnstone
- Karl-Heinz Jungfer
- Marcos Jiménez de la Espada

=== K ===
- Walter Kaudern
- Carl Frederick Kauffeld
- Johann Jakob Kaup
- Wilhelm Moritz Keferstein
- Edward Frederick Kelaart
- Robert Kennicott
- Karl Kessler
- Muhammad Sharif Khan
- Vladimir Kharin
- Frederic Wayne King
- James Roy Kinghorn
- Miguel Ángel Klappenbach
- Laurence Monroe Klauber
- Wolfgang Klausewitz
- Konrad Gerhardt Klemmer
- Reiner Klewen
- Gilbert Klingel (1908–1983)
- Wilhelm Klingelhöffer (1871–1953)
- Arnold G. Kluge
- Hans-Wilhelm Koepcke
- Gunther Köhler (1965–2025)
- Jörn Köhler (born 1970)
- Philippe J. R. Kok
- Felix Kopstein
- Fred Kraus
- Gerard Krefft
- Kenney Krysko
- Heinrich Kuhl
- Axel Kwet

=== L ===
- Bernard Germain de Lacépède
- Frank Fortescue Laidlaw
- Enrique La Marca
- Maxime Lamotte
- Abdem R. Lancini
- Amédée Louis Lantz
- Benedetto Lanza
- Fernand Lataste
- Mahmoud Latifi
- Pierre André Latreille
- Raymond Ferdinand Laurent (1917–2005)
- Josephus Nicolaus Laurenti (1735–1805)
- James D. Lazell, Jr.
- William Elford Leach
- John Eatton LeConte
- Edgar Lehr
- Philipp Lehrs
- Gerald R. Leighton
- Duncan Leitch
- Boonsong Lekagul
- Jean Lescure
- René Primevère Lesson (1794–1849)
- Michele Lessona (1823–1894)
- Charles Alexandre Lesueur
- Martin Hinrich Carl Lichtenstein
- Theodorus Willem van Lidth de Jeude
- François Liénard de la Mivoye
- Wassili Adolfovitch Lindholm (or Wilhelm Adolf Lindholm)
- Carl Linnaeus
- Karen Lips
- Cheng-chao Liu
- Ila Loetscher
- Eugene Bernard Shelley Logier
- Heber Albert Longman
- Einar Lönnberg
- Luis Felipe López-Jurado
- Louis Charles Émile Lortet
- Jonathan Losos
- Stefan Lötters
- Arthur Loveridge
- Charles Herbert Lowe
- Arthur Henry Shakespeare Lucas
- Christian Frederik Lütken
- Adolfo Lutz (1855–1940)
- Bertha Lutz (1894–1976)
- Richard Lydekker
- James Francis Lynch
- John Douglas Lynch

=== M ===
- William John Macleay
- Moichirō Maki
- Borys Malkin
- Catherine L. Malone
- Kelum Manamendra-Arachchi
- Raúl Maneyro
- Eugenio de Jesús Marcano Fondeur
- William Charles Linnaeus Martin (1798–1864)
- Angus Anderson Martin (born 1940)
- Rafael Martín del Campo
- Márcio Roberto Costa Martins
- Hymen Marx
- Abramo Bartolommeo Massalongo
- Paul Matschie
- Masafumi Matsui (born 1950)
- Takaji Matsui (1925–2014)
- Malcolm L. McCallum (born 1968)
- Charles McCann
- Edwin H. McConkey
- C.J. "Jack" McCoy
- Frederick McCoy
- James Randall McCranie
- Roy Wallace McDiarmid
- Keith R. McDonald
- Samuel B. McDowell
- Sean McKeown
- Friedrich Johann Graf von Medem
- Seth Eugene Meek
- Lajos Méhelÿ
- Harald Meier
- Rudolf Mell
- Jane Melville
- Joseph R. Mendelson
- Édouard Ménétries
- James I. Menzies
- Blasius Merrem
- Robert Mertens
- Walter E. Meshaka, Jr.
- Paul Ayshford Methuen
- Adolf Bernhard Meyer (1840–1911)
- Friedrich Albrecht Anton Meyer (1768–1795)
- Karl Michahelles
- Abraham Mijares-Urrutia
- Johann Christian Mikan
- Jacques-Gérard Milbert
- Henri Milne-Edwards
- Sherman A. Minton
- Aurélien Miralles
- Alípio de Miranda-Ribeiro
- Zeeshan Mirza
- Francis John Mitchell (1929–1970)
- Silas Weir Mitchell (1829–1914)
- Russell Mittermeier
- François Mocquard
- Juan Ignacio Molina
- Albert Monard
- John Alexander Moore
- Albert Morice
- Craig Moritz
- Fritz Müller (1834–1895)
- Johannes Peter Müller (1801–1858)
- Lorenz Müller (1868–1953)
- Salomon Müller (1804–1864)
- James A. Murray
- Charles William Myers (1936–2018)
- George S. Myers (1905–1985)

=== N ===
- Jarujin Nabhitabhata
- Marcelo Felgueiras Napoli
- Giovanni Domenico Nardo
- Wilfred T. Neill
- M. Graham Netting
- Oscar Neumann
- Eviatar Nevo
- Ngô Văn Trí
- Van Sang Nguyen
- Hermano Nicéforo María
- Fritz Nieden
- Alexander Mikhailovich Nikolsky
- Gladwyn Kingsley Noble
- Kenneth S. Norris
- Ronald Archie Nussbaum
- Wirot Nutaphand

=== O ===
- Fritz Jürgen Obst
- James Douglas Ogilby
- Annemarie Ohler
- Yaichirō Okada
- James Arthur Oliver
- Paul M. Oliver
- Guillaume-Antoine Olivier
- Nicolaus Michael Oppel
- Gustavo Orcés
- Nikolai Liutsianovich Orlov
- Arthur O'Shaughnessy
- Mark O'Shea
- Masamitsu Ōshima
- Hidetoshi Ota
- Johannes Theodorus Oudemans
- Peter Ouwens

=== P ===
- Palisot de Beauvois
- Peter Simon Pallas
- Hampton Wildman Parker
- Gabriela Parra-Olea
- Georges Pasteur
- Olivier Sylvain Gérard Pauwels
- Oswaldo Luiz Peixoto
- Jacques Pellegrin
- Mario Giacinto Peracca
- François Péron
- Jean-Luc Perret
- Günther Peters (born 1932)
- James A. Peters (1922–1972)
- Wilhelm Peters (1815–1883)
- Rohan Pethiyagoda
- André Peyriéras
- Georg Johann Pfeffer
- Fortunate Mafeta Phaka
- Rodolfo Amando Philippi
- Césaire Phisalix (1852–1906)
- Marie Phisalix (1861–1946)
- Eric Pianka
- Clodomiro Picado Twight
- Raghavan Sridharan Pillai
- Roy Pinney
- Charles Pitman
- Kalyar Platt
- José Perez Pombal Jr.
- Clifford H. Pope
- Andrés Posada-Arango
- Robert Powell
- John Hyacinth Power
- John Charles Poynton
- Jennifer B. Pramuk
- Peter Pritchard (1943–2020)
- Joan Beauchamp Procter (1897–1931)
- Ana Lúcia da Costa Prudente
- William Frank Pyburn

=== Q ===
- Jean René Constant Quoy

=== R ===
- George B. Rabb
- Dioscoro Rabor
- Giuseppe Raddi
- Constantine Samuel Rafinesque
- Andolalao Rakotoarison
- Edward Pierson Ramsay
- Camillo Ranzani
- C. R. Narayan Rao
- Achille Philippe Raselimanana
- Jens B. Rasmussen
- Christopher John Raxworthy
- James R. Reddell
- Francesco Redi
- Anton Reichenow
- Johannes Christopher Hagemann Reinhardt (1778–1845)
- Johannes Theodor Reinhardt (1816–1882)
- Caspar Georg Carl Reinwardt
- Hialmar Rendahl
- Adolph Reuss (1804–1878)
- Albert Franz Theodor Reuss (1879–1958)
- Stephen John Richards
- Leslie Rissler
- Jesús A. Rivas
- Juan A. Rivero
- Joan Robb
- Alphonse Trémeau de Rochebrune
- Dennis Rödder
- Mark-Oliver Rödel
- Miguel Trefaut Rodrigues
- Raymond Rollinat
- Nelly de Rooij
- Erica Bree Rosenblum
- Herbert Rösler
- Douglas A. Rossman
- Jean Roux
- Rolande Roux-Estève
- Janis Roze
- José Vicente Rueda Almonacid
- Pedro Miguel Ruiz-Carranza
- Eduard Rüppell
- Patrick Russell
- Alexander Grant Ruthven

=== S ===
- Ross Allen Sadlier
- Hubert Saint Girons
- Osbert Salvin
- Kate Sanders
- Ikio Satō
- Henri Émile Sauvage
- Jay M. Savage
- Alan H. Savitzky
- Thomas Say
- Ivan Sazima
- Walter E. Schargel
- Mark Scherz
- Heinrich Rudolf Schinz
- Arne Schiøtz
- Hermann Schlegel
- Eduard Oscar Schmidt (1823–1886)
- Franklin J. W. Schmidt (1901–1935)
- Karl Patterson Schmidt (1890–1957)
- Andreas Schmitz
- Johann Gottlob Theaenus Schneider
- Johann David Schoepff
- Ignace Schops
- Gordon W. Schuett
- Rainer Schulte
- Donald Schultz
- Albert Schwartz (1923–1992)
- Ernst Schwarz (1889–1962)
- August Friedrich Schweigger
- William Lutley Sclater
- Giovanni Antonio Scopoli
- Giuseppe Scortecci
- Josefa Celsa Señaris
- Ulrich Iospar Sentzen (or Ulrich Jasper Seetzen)
- Víctor López Seoane
- Marco Antonio Serna
- David M. Sever
- H. Bradley Shaffer
- Frederick A. Shannon
- George Shaw
- Glenn Michael Shea
- Robert Walter Campbell Shelford
- You-hui Shen
- Richard Shine
- Benjamin Shreve
- Friedrich Siebenrock
- Philip Arthur Silverstone-Sopkin
- Jack W. Sites Jr.
- Niane Sivongxay
- Bror Yngve Sjöstedt
- Avery Judd Skilton
- Kenneth R. Slater
- Joseph Richard Slevin
- Joseph Bruno Slowinski
- Andrew Smith (1797–1872)
- Eric Nelson Smith (born 1969)
- Hobart Muir Smith (1912–2013)
- Malcolm Arthur Smith (1875–1958)
- Rozella B. Smith (1911–1987)
- Howard Snell
- Charles-Nicolas-Sigisbert Sonnini de Manoncourt
- Ferdinando Sordelli
- Anders Sparrman
- Johann Baptist von Spix
- Stewart Springer
- France Staub
- Robert C. Stebbins (1915–2013)
- David A. Steen
- Franz Steindachner
- Sebastian Steinfartz
- Heinz Steinitz
- Leonhard Stejneger
- Richard Sternfeld
- Margaret Stewart
- Austin Stevens
- Edward Charles Stirling
- Ferdinand Stoliczka
- David Humphreys Storer
- Margaret Hamilton Storey
- Glen Milton Storr
- Alexander Strauch
- John Kern Strecker
- Bryan Lynn Stuart
- Laurence Cooper Stuart (1907–1983)
- Olive Griffith Stull
- Samuel Stutchbury
- Georg Adolf Suckow
- Mykola Szczerbak (1927–1998)

=== T ===
- Vasco M. Tanner (1892–1989)
- Wilmer W. Tanner (1909–2011)
- Edward Harrison Taylor
- Coenraad Jacob Temminck
- Pavel Terentiev
- William Theobald
- Richard Thomas
- Joseph Cheesman Thompson
- Scott A. Thomson
- Carl Peter Thunberg
- Donald W. Tinkle
- Gustav Tornier
- C. Richard Tracy
- Thomas Stewart Traill
- Gerard Troost
- Franz Hermann Troschel
- Stanley E. Trauth
- Linda Trueb
- Johann Jakob von Tschudi
- Evan Graham Turbott
- Michael Tweedie
- Victor Chandler Twitty
- Michael James Tyler
- Robert Christopher Tytler

=== U ===
- Gabriel N. Ugueto
- Peter Uetz
- Garth Underwood

=== V ===
- Léon Vaillant
- Achille Valenciennes
- Domenico Vandelli
- John Van Denburgh
- Peter Paul van Dijk
- Johan Coenraad van Hasselt
- Pieter Nicolaas van Kampen
- Paulo Vanzolini
- Eloise-Mae Varga
- Karthikeyan Vasudevan
- Georg Veith
- Jehan Albert Vellard
- Miguel Vences
- Desmond Vesey-Fitzgerald
- André Villiers
- Nicole Viloteau
- Decio Vinciguerra
- Percy Viosca
- Gernot Vogel (born 1963)
- Zdeněk Vogel (1913–1986)
- Carl Vogt (or Karl Vogt) (1817–1895)
- Richard Vogt (1949–2021)

=== W ===
- Johann Georg Wagler
- Philipp Wagner
- Edgar Ravenswood Waite
- David B. Wake
- Marvalee Wake
- Frank Wall
- Van Stanley Bartholomew Wallach
- David Warrell
- Richard Wassersug
- Dick Watling
- Jayantha Wattavidanage
- Robert G. Webb
- Max Carl Wilhelm Weber
- David Friedrich Weinland
- Worth Hamilton Weller
- Richard W. Wells
- Franz Werner (1867–1939)
- Yehudah Leopold Werner (born 1931)
- Heiko Werning
- Otto von Wettstein
- Anthony Whitaker (1944–2014)
- Romulus Whitaker (born 1943)
- John White
- Tony Whitten
- Mendis Wickramasinghe
- Prince Maximilian of Wied-Neuwied
- Arend Friedrich August Wiegmann
- Inez Whipple Wilder (1871–1929)
- Grace Olive Wiley
- Mark Wilkinson
- Ernest Edward Williams (1914–1998)
- Kenneth L. Williams (1934–2017)
- Thomas M. Wilms
- Larry David Wilson
- Bobby Witcher
- John Woinarski
- Willy Wolterstorff
- Perry Lee Wood Jr.
- Angus M. Woodbury
- William Hartman Woodin, III
- Eric Worrell
- Trevor H. Worthy
- Albert Hazen Wright
- Anna Allen Wright
- O.E.H. Wucherer
- Wolfgang Wüster

=== X ===
- John Xantus

=== Y ===
- José Yáñez Valenzuela
- Da-tong Yang
- Henry Crecy Yarrow
- Yankho Chapeta

=== Z ===
- Hussam Zaher
- Kelly Zamudio
- Rainer Zangerl
- Jonathan Zenneck
- Er-mi Zhao
- Thomas Ziegler
- Amandus Heinrich Christian Zietz
- George Robert Zug
- Erich Zugmayer
- Richard G. Zweifel

== See also ==
- Herpetology
- Herping
