= Horned frog =

Horned frog is a common name used to identify several kinds of frogs with hornlike features:

- Asian horned frog, genus Megophrys of the mesobatrachian Megophryidae
- Rough horned frog, genus Borneophrys of the mesobatrachian Megophryidae
- South American horned frog, genus Ceratophrys of the neobatrachian Ceratophryidae
- Long-nosed horned frog, genus Pelobatrachus of the mesobatrachian Megophyridae

== See also ==
- Horned lizard or Phrynosoma, a genus of lizard native to North and Central America and sometimes called a "horned toad"
- Texas horned lizard or Phrynosoma cornutum, a species of horned lizard
