= Brazaitis =

- Lithuanian surname
- m.: Brazaitis
- f.: (unmarried): Brazaitytė
- f.: (married): Brazaitienė
- f.: (short): Brazaitė

Brazaitis is a Lithuanian patronymic surname derived from the given name (and surname) Brazys. Varaiant: Bražaitis, from "Bražys".

- Algimantas Brazaitis (1932–2020) Lithuanian Soviet functionary and journalist
- Juozas Brazaitis
- Peter Brazaitis

== See also ==
- Gintarė Bražaitė
