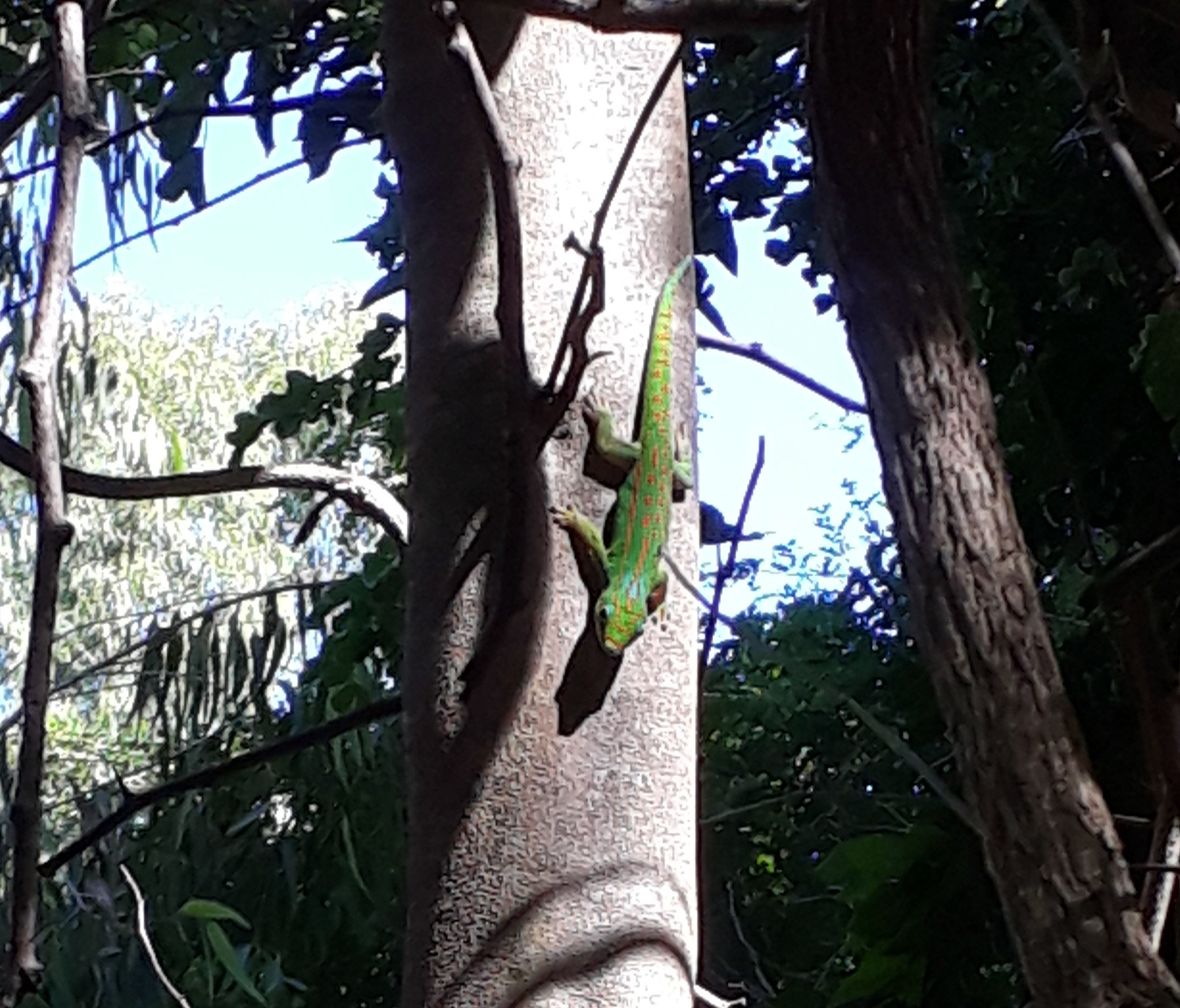

Conservation status
- Endangered (IUCN 3.1)

Scientific classification
- Kingdom: Animalia
- Phylum: Chordata
- Class: Reptilia
- Order: Squamata
- Suborder: Gekkota
- Family: Gekkonidae
- Genus: Phelsuma
- Species: P. guimbeaui

Binomial name
- Phelsuma guimbeaui Mertens, 1963

= Mauritius lowland forest day gecko =

Species of lizard

The Mauritius lowland forest day gecko (Phelsuma guimbeaui), also known commonly as Guimbeau's day gecko and the orange-spotted day gecko, is a diurnal species of gecko, a lizard in the family Gekkonidae. The species is native to the western coast of Mauritius and typically inhabits large trees. The Mauritius lowland forest day gecko feeds on insects and nectar.

== Etymology ==
The specific name, guimbeaui, is in honor of the collector of the holotype, "Mr. B[ernard] Guimbeau".

== Description ==
Phelsuma. guimbeaui belongs to the mid-sized genus Phelsuma. Males can reach a total length (including tail) of about 15.5 cm (6.1 in). Females are only 9–13 cm (3.5–5.1 in). The Mauritius lowland forest day gecko has a short, compact body form. The dorsal body colour is a brilliant green with a diffuse blue area on the neck region. There are irregular shaped orange-red bars and spots on the back and tail, the tip of which may be blue. The ventral side is whitish-yellow. One or two brown v-shaped bars are present on the chin. Juveniles are greyish-brown with little white spots, and start changing colour after six months. After 12–15 months, they have the adult appearance.

== Geographic range ==
Phelsuma guimbeaui inhabits the western side of Mauritius. It occurs at low and mid elevation. Populations can be found at the villages of Chamarel, Yemen, Tamarin and Grande Rivière Noire. P. guimbeaui is also established on the Hawaiian island of Oahu.

== Habitat ==
The Mauritius lowland forest day gecko prefers large trees such as palms and acacia species. P. guimbeaui is only rarely seen near human dwellings. It lives in the drier and warmer part of Mauritius. Much of the lowland forest of Mauritius, which is the original habitat of P. guimbeaui, has been cleared to make way for sugar cane plantations. P. guimbeaui sometimes shares its habitat with P. cepediana and P. ornata.

== Diet ==
The Mauritius lowland forest day gecko feeds on various insects and other invertebrates. It also likes to lick soft, sweet fruit, pollen and nectar.

== Behaviour ==
The Mauritius lowland forest day gecko is rather shy as it is heavily predated by different bird species.

== Reproduction ==
In P. guimbeaui the pairing season is between March and the first weeks of September. During this period, the females lay up to 6 pairs of eggs. The young will hatch after approximately 60–90 days. The juveniles measure 36–40 mm (1.4–1.6 in). The Mauritius lowland forest day gecko is an egg gluer and often a colony nester. It often lays its eggs in tree holes. Juveniles reach pubescence after 18–20 months.

== Threats ==
Phelsuma guimbeaui has been evaluated by the IUCN as "endangered". Its habitat is small and fragmented. Moreover, 12 of 19 endemic reptile species from mainland Mauritius are extinct. It is traded commercially as a terrarium pet and this may be a threat; little is known about trade in Phelsuma species. Phelsuma are all CITES Appendix II listed.

== Care and maintenance in captivity ==
Phelsuma guimbeaui should be housed in pairs in a large, well planted terrarium for the highest success. The daytime temperature should be between 29 and 32 °C (84 and 90 °F). During the night, the temperature should drop to approximately 20 °C (68 °F). The humidity should be maintained between 60 and 70%. In captivity, P. guimbeaui can be fed with crickets, commercial fructivorous gecko diets, wax moths, fruits flies, mealworms, and houseflies.

== Sources ==
- Henkel, Friedrich-Wilhelm; Schmidt, Wolfgang (1995). Amphibien und Reptilien Madagaskars, der Maskarenen, Seychellen und Komoren. Stuttgart: Ulmer. 311 pp. ISBN 3-8001-7323-9. (in German).
- McKeown, Sean (1993). The General Care and Maintenance of Day Geckos. Lakeside, California: Advanced Vivarium Systems.
