= Spadefoot =

Spadefoot may refer to the following toads:

- Scaphiopodidae, a family, the American spadefoot toads
- Megophrys edwardinae, Edwardina's spadefoot toad, a species of southeast Asia
- Notaden, a genus, the Australian spadefoot toads
- Pelobatidae, a family with one extant genus, Pelobates, the European spadefoot toads
