= Rissler =

Rissler may refer to:

- Leslie Rissler (born 1969), American biologist
- Sigrid Rissler (1868-1918), Swedish botanist
- John Rissler "Jack" Messer (born 1941), Canadian farmer and former political figure of the Saskatchewan New Democratic Party from 1971 to 1980
