= Brazys =

- Lithuanian surname
- m.: Brazys
- f.: (unmarried): Brazytė
- f.: (married): Brazienė

Brazys is a Lithuanian given name and surname, probably a truncation of the given name Ambrazas, i.e., Ambrosius. Similar names are Brazas, Brožys, Bražas, similar to Polish names Brozik, Brożek from "Ambroży".

It gave rise to the patronymic surname Brazaitis.
