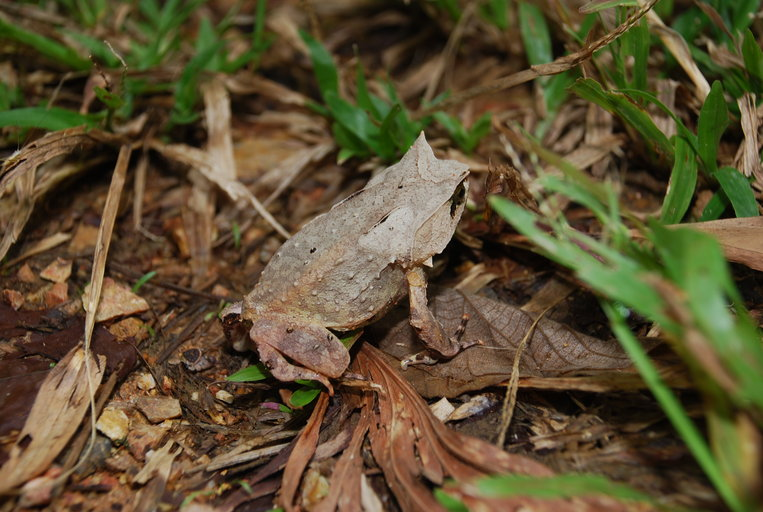

Conservation status
- Near Threatened (IUCN 3.1)

Scientific classification
- Kingdom: Animalia
- Phylum: Chordata
- Class: Amphibia
- Order: Anura
- Family: Megophryidae
- Genus: Pelobatrachus
- Species: P. ligayae

Binomial name
- Pelobatrachus ligayae (Taylor, 1920)

Synonyms
- Megophrys monticola ligayae; Megophrys ligayae Taylor, 1920

= Palawan horned frog =

Species of horned frog

The Palawan horned frog (Pelobatrachus ligayae) is a species of frog in the family Megophryidae. It is endemic to the Balabac and Palawan islands, in the Philippines. Its natural habitats are tropical dry forests, subtropical or tropical moist lowland forests, moist montane forests, moist shrubland, rivers, and intermittent rivers. It is threatened by habitat loss.

Formerly placed in the genus Megophrys, it was reclassified into the genus Pelobatrachus in 2021.
