= Aaron Matthew Bauer =

American zoologist and herpetologist

- Born: June 27, 1961 (age 65); New York City, United States
- Known for: Research on geckos; discovery of extinct and extant lizard species
- Scientific career
- Fields: Biology, Zoology
- Workplaces: Villanova University
- Author abbrev. (zoology): Bauer

Aaron Matthew Bauer (born June 27, 1961, in New York City) is an American biologist and zoologist. He is currently a professor of biology at Villanova University in Pennsylvania, United States, where he resides.

After studying in New York and Michigan, he pursued zoological studies at the University of California, Berkeley from 1982 to 1986, where he earned his Ph.D.

Bauer studies the evolution of geckos from a biological perspective and also investigates the causes of species extinction.

He is responsible for the discovery of numerous species of lizards, including some that are now extinct, such as Hoplodactylus delcourti.

== Selected publications ==
- Johnson, C.B.; Quah, E.S.H.; Anuar, S.; Muin, M.A.; Wood, P.L. Jr.; Grismer, J.L.; Greer, L.F.; Chan, K.O.; Ahmad, N.; Bauer, A.M.; Grismer, L.L. (2012). "Phylogeography, geographic variation, and taxonomy of the Bent-toed Gecko Cyrtodactylus quadrivirgatus Taylor, 1962 from Peninsular Malaysia with the description of a new swamp dwelling species". Zootaxa 3406: 39–58.
- Bauer, A.M.; Jackman, T.R.; Sadlier, R.A.; Whitaker, A.H. (2012). "Revision of the giant geckos of New Caledonia (Reptilia: Diplodactylidae: Rhacodactylus)". Zootaxa 3404: 1–52.

== Honors ==
- Honorary member and research associate of the California Academy of Sciences.

== See also ==
- List of zoologists
- List of herpetologists
