= Phrynobatrachus stewartae =

Conservation status
- Least Concern (IUCN 3.1)

Scientific classification
- Kingdom: Animalia
- Phylum: Chordata
- Class: Amphibia
- Order: Anura
- Family: Phrynobatrachidae
- Genus: Phrynobatrachus
- Species: P. stewartae

Binomial name
- Phrynobatrachus stewartae Poynton and Broadley, 1985

Species of amphibian

Phrynobatrachus stewartae, also known as the Stewart's puddle frog or Stewart's river frog, is a species of frog in the family Phrynobatrachidae. It is found in northern Malawi and south-central and western Tanzania. The specific name stewartae honours Margaret M. Stewart, an American herpetologist who wrote "Amphibians of Malawi" (1967) and collected the type series, originally identified as Phrynobatrachus gutturosus.

== Description ==
Males can grow to 21 mm (0.8 in) and females to 23 mm (0.9 in) in snout–vent length. The finger and toe tips are not expanded into discs. The toes are broadly webbed. The femoral glands are elongated and flattened, and conspicuous yellow in males. Males have a baggy vocal sac with a clear posterior flap. The upper and lower jaws are barred. The gular region is greyish in males but speckled in females.

== Habitat and conservation ==
Phrynobatrachus stewartae occurs in marshy areas in dry forest and grassland at elevations of 800–1,200 m (2,600–3,900 ft) above sea level. It is especially found in areas where aquatic vegetation is present. Breeding presumably takes place in marshes and well-vegetated, standing bodies of water. Its habitat in Tanzania is threatened by habitat degradation caused by conversion to agriculture or by overharvesting. While it exhibits a degree of tolerance to modified habitats, it is poorly understood to what extent this species is threatened by expanding agriculture. It is present in the Mulenge Forest Reserve and the Katavi National Park, and it is likely to occur in the Nyika National Park that is close to its type locality.
