= Herpetological Monographs =

- Discipline: Herpetology
- Language: English
- Edited by: Michael Harvey

Publication details
- History: 1982-present
- Publisher: Herpetologists' League (United States)
- Frequency: Annually
- Impact factor: 2.5 (2022)

Standard abbreviations
- ISO 4: Herpetol. Monogr.

Indexing
- ISSN: 0733-1347 (print); 1938-5137 (web)
- LCCN: 89657063
- JSTOR: 07331347
- OCLC no.: 52427622

Links
- Journal homepage; Online archive

Herpetological Monographs is a peer-reviewed scientific journal covering the zoology of amphibians and reptiles. It is published annually by the Herpetologists' League and was established in 1982. The League also publishes a quarterly peer-reviewed journal, Herpetologica. The editor-in-chief is Michael Harvey (Broward College). Previous editors include Todd Reeder (University of California, San Diego and Lee Fitzgerald (Texas A&M University). According to the Journal Citation Reports, the journal has a 2022 impact factor of 2.5.
