= Césaire Phisalix =

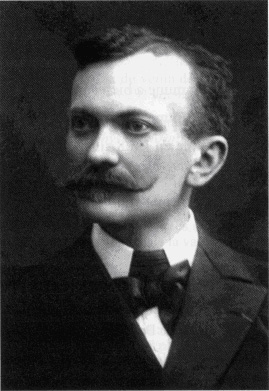
Césaire Phisalix (1852–1906)

Césaire Phisalix (8 October 1852, Mouthier-Haute-Pierre – 16 March 1906) was a French physician and biologist. He was the husband of Marie Picot Phisalix (1861–1946), an expert on venoms and venomous animals.

He studied sciences at the Catholic college in Besançon and medicine in Paris, earning his medical doctorate in 1877. Later, he continued his studies at the military school in Val de Grâce with Alphonse Laveran, a future winner of the Nobel Prize in Physiology or Medicine. In 1886, he was named deputy professor of zoology at the school of medicine and pharmacy in Besançon, and in 1888 was appointed director of travaux de zoologie at the faculty of Besançon. Shortly afterwards, he returned to Paris, where he served as a lecturer at the Muséum national d'histoire naturelle.

Along with biochemist Gabriel Bertrand, Phisalix isolated the psychedelic drug bufotenin in 1893, though its hallucinogenic effects were not discovered until much later. In 1894, also with Bertrand, he developed an antivenom for treatment against snake bites. For his research on venom and venomous animals, he was awarded the Prix Montyon in 1894 and the Prix Bréant in 1898 and was created a Chevalier of the Legion of Honour in 1900.

== Selected works ==
- Nouvelles expèriences sur le venin de la Salamandre terrestre, 1889 - New experiences involving venom of the terrestrial salamander.
- Sur l'emploi et le mode d'action du chlorure de chaux contre la morsure des serpents venimeux (with Gabriel Bertrand) 1895 - On the use and mode of action of chloride of lime against the bite of poisonous snakes.
- Variation de virulence du venin de vipère (with Gabriel Bertrand), 1895 - Variation of virulence of viper venom.
- La tyrosine, vaccin chimique du venin de vipère, 1898 - Tyrosine, chemical vaccine of viper venom.
