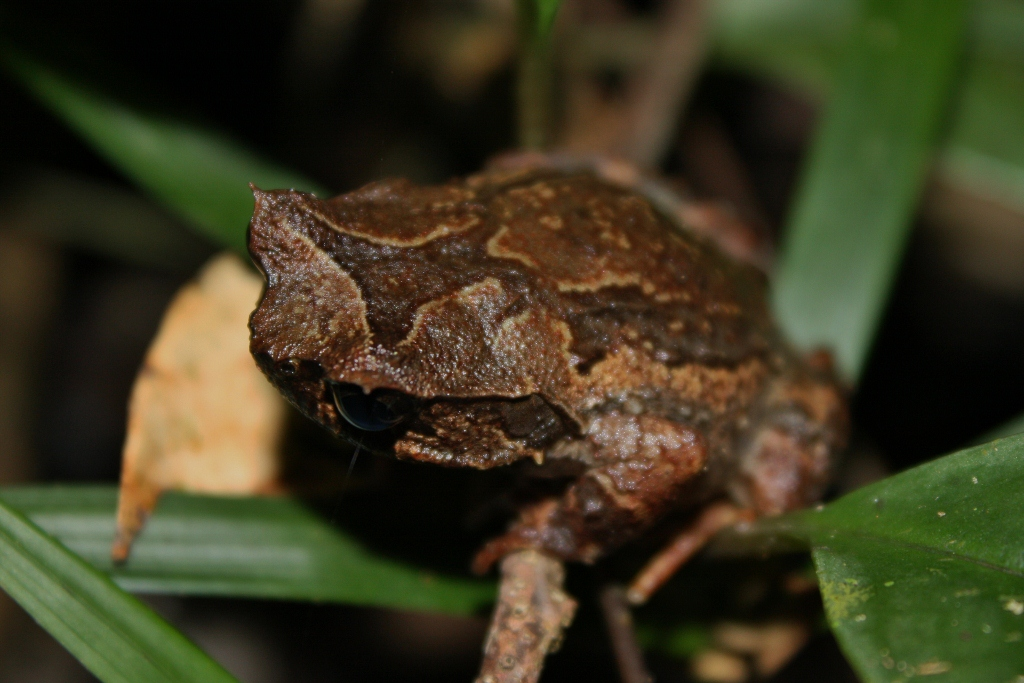

Conservation status
- Near Threatened (IUCN 3.1)

Scientific classification
- Kingdom: Animalia
- Phylum: Chordata
- Class: Amphibia
- Order: Anura
- Family: Megophryidae
- Genus: Pelobatrachus
- Species: P. baluensis

Binomial name
- Pelobatrachus baluensis (Boulenger, 1899)

Synonyms
- Leptobrachium baluense Boulenger, 1899; Xenophrys baluensis (Boulenger, 1899); Megophrys baluensis

= Kinabalu horned frog =

Species of amphibian

The Kinabalu horned frog or Balu spadefoot toad (Pelobatrachus baluensis) is a species of amphibian in the family Megophryidae. It is endemic to northeastern Borneo in Sabah, Malaysia. Its natural habitats are subtropical or tropical moist montane forests and rivers.

Formerly placed in the genus Megophrys, it was reclassified into the genus Pelobatrachus in 2021.
