= Pelobatrachus kalimantanensis =

Scientific classification
- Kingdom: Animalia
- Phylum: Chordata
- Class: Amphibia
- Order: Anura
- Family: Megophryidae
- Genus: Pelobatrachus
- Species: P. kalimantanensis

Binomial name
- Pelobatrachus kalimantanensis (Munir, Hamidy, Matsui, Iskandar, Sidik, and Shimada, 2019)

Species of frog

Pelobatrachus kalimantanensis, the Kalimantan horned frog, is a species of frog from the Pelobatrachus genus. It is native to forests and wetlands of Indonesia. The species was scientifically described in 2019.
