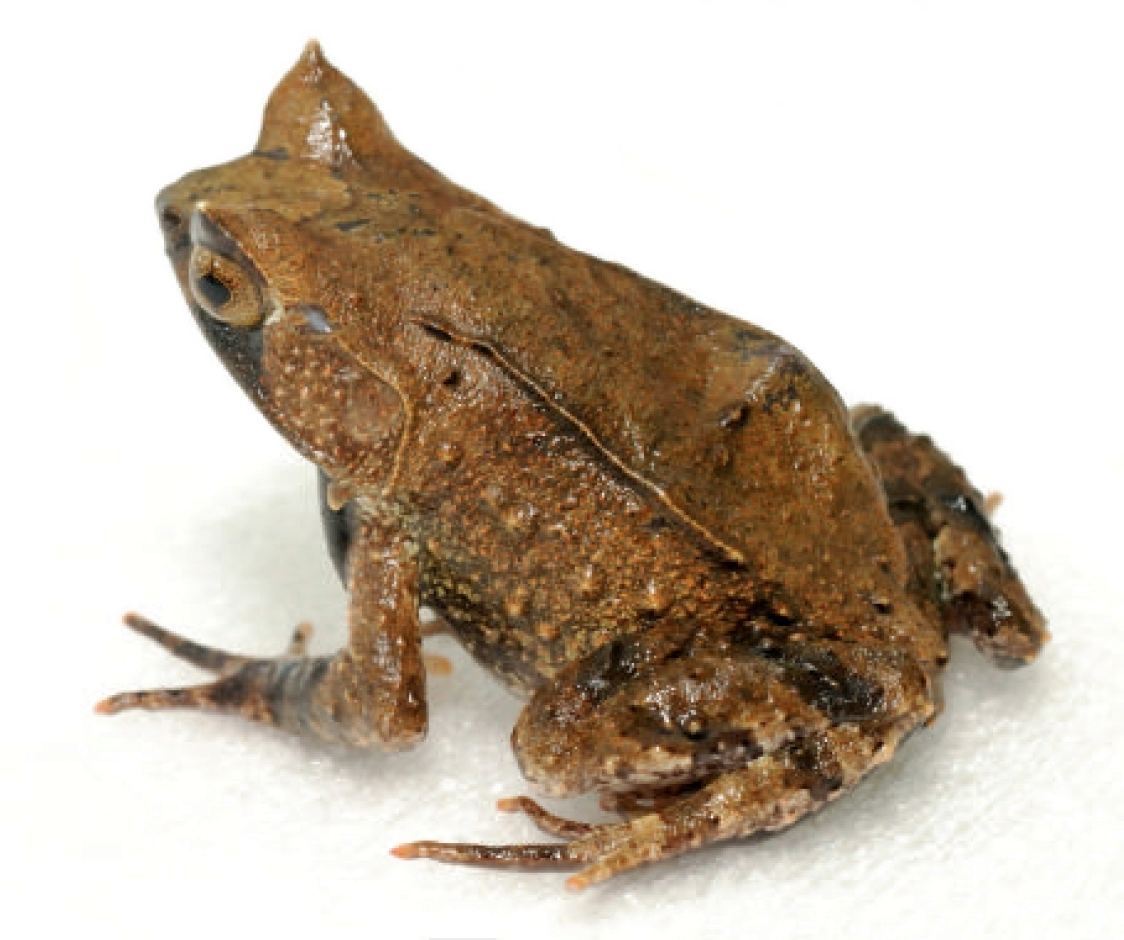

Conservation status
- Least Concern (IUCN 3.1)

Scientific classification
- Kingdom: Animalia
- Phylum: Chordata
- Class: Amphibia
- Order: Anura
- Family: Megophryidae
- Genus: Pelobatrachus
- Species: P. stejnegeri

Binomial name
- Pelobatrachus stejnegeri (Taylor, 1920)

Synonyms
- Megophrys stejnegeri Taylor, 1920

= Mindanao horned frog =

Species of amphibian

The Mindanao horned frog (Pelobatrachus stejnegeri) is a species of amphibian in the family Megophryidae. It is endemic to the Philippines.

Its natural habitats are subtropical or tropical moist lowland forests, subtropical or tropical moist montane forests, rivers, and intermittent rivers. It is threatened by habitat loss.

== Taxonomy ==
Formerly placed in the genus Megophrys, it was reclassified into the genus Pelobatrachus in 2021.

== Habitat ==
The Mindanao horned frog is only found on the island of Mindanao in the Philippines. It is mostly found near a fresh water supply when it can lay its eggs or in dense underbrush, leaf litter, or other fallen object covering the ground. The climate of the ecoregion is tropical wet, with temperature and rainfall modified by the elevation, which reaches up to 2,700 meters. The vegetation in this area consists of hill dipterocarp forests, lower and upper montane forest, elfin woodland (mossy forest) and summit grasslands. The area also experiences rainy seasons and frequent monsoons. June–October is the areas monsoon/rainy season, while in December–May there are "trade winds" which bring little rainfall, making it harder for the frog to find suitably wet places to breed.

== Diet ==
The Mindanao horned frog's diet is affected by its homeland in the forests of Mindanao. It will eat most of the insects found in Mindanao, it will also consume snails, spiders, worms, and occasionally frogs that are smaller than itself.

== Threats ==
The Mindanao horned frog is currently listed as vulnerable on the endangered species scale because its distribution is rather fragmented; it covers an area of less than 20,000 km^{2} and is continuously shrinking due to deforestation. The frog's major threat is presented by humans. The loss of the frogs habitat in the lowland forest, due to logging, is causing the frogs to compete for food, water and space. Also the pollution caused by the agricultural and mine-tailing of humans in the area is causing the mountain streams and rivers to become polluted leaving fewer places for frogs to produce and rear their young. There are many other animal species living on and around the island of Mindanao. There are over thirty-four bird species native to the area, of which more than half, such as the Mindanao scops owl, the Philippine eagle-owl, and the blue-capped kingfisher, prey on the Mindanao horned frog. In addition to the birds, other animals such as snakes and fish prey on the frog and its young, whilst pets, such as cats and dogs, also pose a threat.
