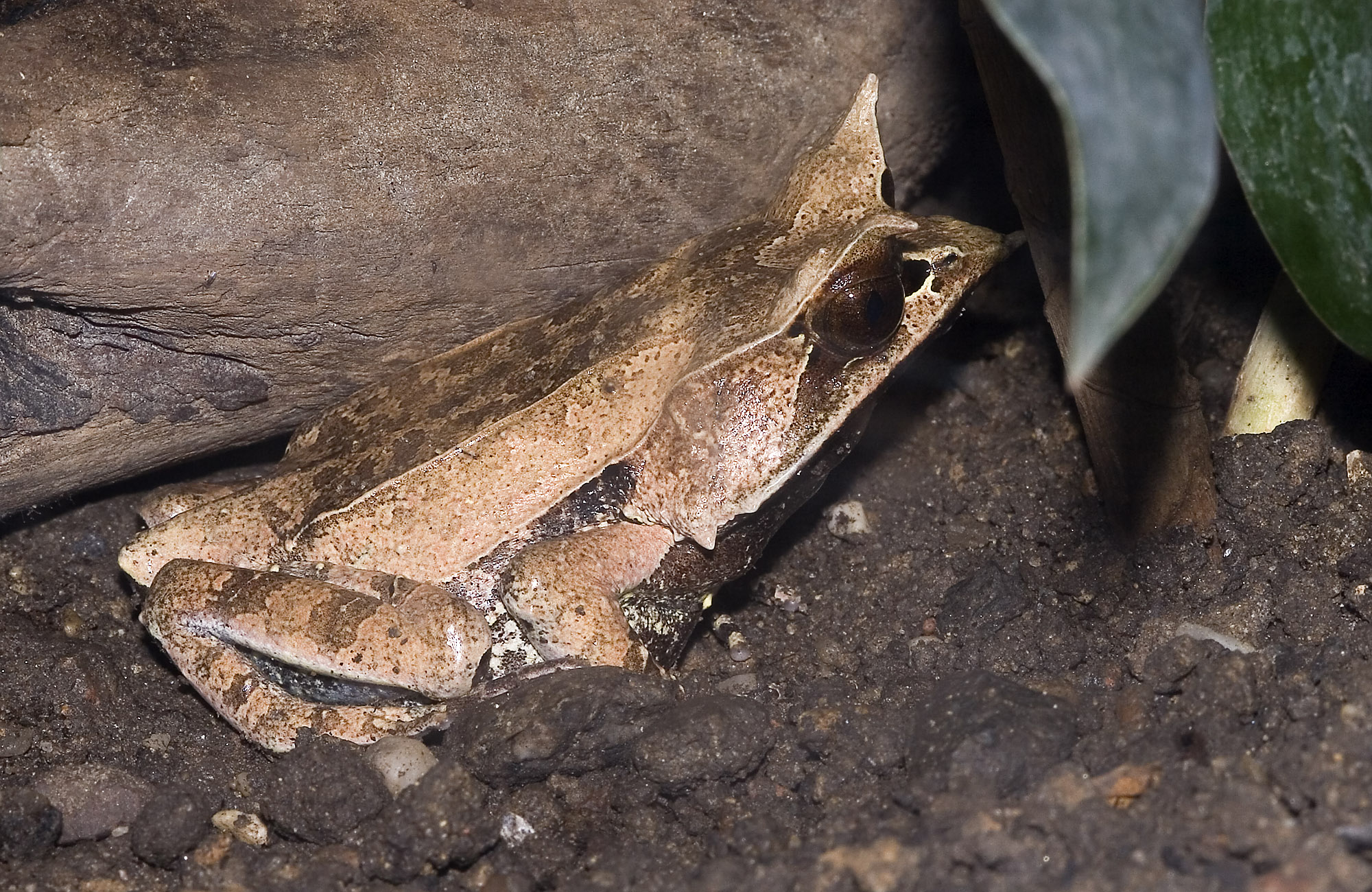
- Long-nosed horned frog (P. nasutus)

Scientific classification
- Kingdom: Animalia
- Phylum: Chordata
- Class: Amphibia
- Order: Anura
- Family: Megophryidae
- Subfamily: Megophryinae
- Genus: Pelobatrachus; Beddard, 1908 "1907"

Species
- See text

= Pelobatrachus =

Genus of amphibians

Pelobatrachus is a genus of frogs in the family Megophryidae. It was formerly synonymized with Megophrys until 2021, when it was revived as a distinct genus. They inhabit Southeast Asia, namely the Malay Peninsula, Sumatra, Borneo and the Philippines. Their common name is clay horned toads.

== Taxonomy ==
The following species are recognized in the genus Pelobatrachus:

- Pelobatrachus baluensis (Boulenger, 1899) — Kinabalu horned frog
- Pelobatrachus edwardinae (Inger, 1989) — Edwardina's horned frog
- Pelobatrachus kalimantanensis (Munir, Hamidy, Matsui, Iskandar, Sidik, and Shimada, 2019) — Kalimantan horned frog
- Pelobatrachus kobayashii (Malkmus and Matsui, 1997) — Kobayashi's horned frog
- Pelobatrachus ligayae (Taylor, 1920) — Palawan horned frog
- Pelobatrachus nasutus (Schlegel, 1858) — long-nosed horned frog or Malayan horned frog
- Pelobatrachus stejnegeri (Taylor, 1920) — Mindanao horned frog
