= Chan Eng Heng =

Malaysian turtle conservationist

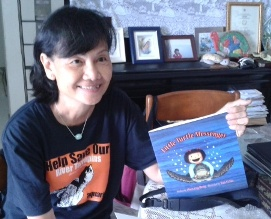
- Chan Eng Heng with her book "Little Turtle Messenger"
- Born: Chan Eng Heng; 7 January 1950 (age 76); Penang, Malaysia
- Education: Convent Light Street, Penang; St. Xavier's Institution, Penang; Universiti Sains Malaysia, Penang; Kagoshima University, Japan
- Known for: Study and conservation of turtles
- Awards: UNEP Global 500 Roll of Honour (2001) UNEP's Who's Who of Women and the Environment (2006) ISTS International Sea Turtle Society Lifetime Achievement Award (2019) Wiki Impact 100 Changemakers in Malaysia (2022)

Chan Eng Heng is a Malaysian turtle conservationist. She is a retired professor from Universiti Malaysia Terengganu, who has been recognised by the United Nations Environment Program for her efforts to protect sea turtles.

Chan was inducted to the UNEP Global 500 Roll of Honour and became a Global 500 Laureate in 2001 and in 2006 she was listed in the UNEP's Who's Who of Women and the Environment. In 2019, Chan was a recipient of a Lifetime Achievement Award from the International Sea Turtle Society. In addition, in 2022, Chan was recognised as one of the Wiki Impact 100 Changemakers creating real impact in Malaysia.

== Education and career ==
Dr. Chan Eng Heng was born in Georgetown, Penang, Malaysia in 1950. Completed primary and secondary school education in Convent Light Street and sixth form in St. Xavier's Institution, Chan Obtained BSc (Hons) and MSc degrees from Universiti Sains Malaysia before embarking on an academic career in University Putra Malaysia (previously known as Agriculture University of Malaysia).

In 1993, Chan earned her PhD from Kagoshima University, in Japan, under the RONPAKU scholarship programme of the Japanese Society for the Promotion of Science.

=== Turtle research ===
Chan had co-founded and co-led the Sea Turtle Research Unit aka SEATRU in Universiti Malaysia Terengganu between 1985 and 2009, and retired from the post as a professor.

In 2011, fuelled by her passion to continue working on turtle conservation, Chan co-founded the Turtle Conservation Society of Malaysia. Chan has served as President and vice-president in the society.

Chan is well known, both locally and abroad for her contributions in the field of turtle research, conservation and education. The recognition of her expertise has been reflected in the various appointments at the national, regional and international levels accorded to her. Chan has also served as turtle expert in numerous regional and international sea turtle workshops, besides having been invited as guest/plenary/keynote speaker at numerous conferences and seminars.

=== Turtle Alley in Chinatown ===
After retirement, Chan also started dabbling in art as a medium to help create awareness on turtles. She helped renovate Kuala Terengganu, a derelict alley in Chinatown, into a Turtle Alley to celebrate turtles and to bring more awareness to their plight. The alley is adorned with turtle mosaics mounted on the walls as well as along the walkway. Turtle trivia, fact sheets and her book, "Little Turtle Messenger" etched in metallic plates further enhance the educational value of the alley.

== Positions ==
=== Past Positions ===
Universiti Sains Malaysia

1. Tutor, 1973–1976

Universiti Pertanian Malaysia

2. Lecturer, 1976–1991
3. Project Leader, Sea Turtle Research Unit (SEATRU), 1985–2009
4. Associate Professor, 1991–2001

Kolej Universiti Sains dan Teknologi Malaysia

5. Associate Professor, 2001–2002
6. Department Head, Department of Biological Sciences, 2002–2004
7. Professor, 2002–2006

Universiti Malaysia Terengganu

8. Professor, 2006–2009

=== Other Positions ===
1. Co-Founder and Vice-President, Turtle Conservation Society of Malaysia.
2. Member, Turtle Sanctuary Advisory Council, State Government of Terengganu (by appointment)
3. Member, Tortoise and Freshwater Turtle Specialist Group, Species Survival Commission, International Union for Conservation of Nature (membership by invitation)
4. Field Conservation committee member (South East Asia), Turtle Survival Alliance, USA (by appointment)
5. Country Representative, Editorial Board, Indian Ocean Turtle Newsletter (by appointment)
6. Technical Advisor, Joint Management Committee, Turtle Islands Heritage Protected Area (by appointment from Sabah Parks)
7. Member, Marine Turtle Specialist Group, Species Survival Commission, IUCN (membership by invitation)

== Achievements and recognition ==
Chan is recognised for initiating the first Malaysian in-situ egg protection program for marine turtles in the Chagar Hutang Turtle Sanctuary in Redang Island. Since its inception in 1993, the project has developed into a long-term nesting and tagging research program that incorporates a highly successful volunteer program. By extending her work to cover the critically endangered river terrapins of Terengganu in 2004, Chan has supported that work evolve into community-based projects in the Setiu and Kemaman Rivers under the Turtle Conservation Society of Malaysia. Her conferment into the UNEP Global 500 Roll of Honour in 2001 was another mention Chan's contributions in marine turtle conservation were recognised by the United Nations Environment Programme, as well as being listed in the UNEP's Who's Who of Women and the Environment in 2006. In Malaysia, the late Sultan of Terengganu conferred Chan in 1991 the title Pingat Jasa Kebaktian (PJK) in recognition of her contributions in the state. The university has also honored Chan with several research awards.In 2019, Chan was a recipient of a Lifetime Achievement Award from the International Sea Turtle Society. In addition, in 2022, Chan was recognised as one of the Wiki Impact 100 Changemakers creating real impact in Malaysia.

== Authorship ==
Many of Chan's written works have been applied directly in the conservation of turtles in Malaysia, either to enhance existing efforts, or to develop new approaches in protecting turtles. Chan has published extensively in peer-reviewed journals, conference proceedings, magazines and newsletters, and a children's book titled "Little Turtle Messenger" is an educational tool on the field for turtle watchers as well as those young wildlife supporters at home. Citations of Chan's publications have been printed extensively in the report of the WTO aka World Trade Organization, Panel on the United States – dated 15 May 1998.

=== TV programmes ===
Chan's work on sea turtles has been featured in both local and foreign TV programmes, such as "Beyond 2000″, "World Gone Wild" (Fox Family Channel), "Meeting a New Asia" (NHK), "Our Scientists and Inventors" (Momentum II), as well as TV3′s "Majalah 3″ and "Malaysia Hari Ini".

Save our Turtles Outreach Program (popularly called STOP) that SEATRU projects in Universiti Malaysia Terengganu is another innovative avenue Chan is known for, aiming at endearing turtle conservation to the hearts of the common public. STOP has installed "nest and turtle adoption schemes" and a series of volunteer programs, which involve the public directly in turtle conservation efforts. As attested in the 30-odd media articles on that program, STOP has been publicised through wide range of media thresholds.

Chan was conferred a 2019 Lifetime Achievement Award at the International Sea Turtle Symposium.

== Research Projects ==
1. Satellite tracking of hawksbill turtles from Chagar Hutang Beach, Redang Island – a joint research project with the Southwest Fisheries Science Center Honolulu Laboratory, National Marine Fisheries of NOAA, USA. The satellite transmitter and ARGOS service was fully sponsored by NOAA.
2. Satellite-tracking project on Malaysian sea turtles – collaborative research project with Prof. Wataru Sakamoto from Kyoto University, Japan. The satellite transmitter and Argos service was fully sponsored by Kyoto University.
3. Tagging and nesting research on the sea turtles of Pulau Redang. Initiated in 1993 in Pulau Redang, it is now continued as a longterm on-going project. IRPA funding was provided under the 6th Malaysia Plan, and donations made by private corporations, international schools and the public fund the project presently.
4. In-situ incubation of green turtle eggs in Redang Island. Also supported by donors at private corporations, international schools and the public.
5. Radio, ultrasonic and satellite tracking of sea turtles from the Sarawak Turtle Islands – joint research with the Sarawak Forestry Corporation and fully funded by IRPA grants awarded to Sarawak Forestry.
6. Sex ratio studies on the green turtles of the Sarawak Turtle Islands. Funded as in above.
7. Tagging and nesting research on the sea turtles of Sabah and Sarawak Turtle Islands. Carried out as final year research projects in 2019.
8. Radio, ultrasonic and satellite telemetry of the green turtles of Terengganu. Funded by an IRPA grant to KUSTEM scientists.
9. Radio-tracking the internesting movements of leatherback turtles. In collaboration with Drs. Scott and Karen Eckert of the US, funded jointly by an IRPA grant and the Terengganu State Government.
10. Genetic studies on Malaysian sea turtles. Funded by an IRPA grant to KUSTEM scientists.
11. Diving behaviour of leatherback turtles. In Collaboration with Drs. Scott and Karen Eckert of the US, funded jointly by an IRPA grant and the Terengganu State Government.
12. Ultrastructure of sea turtle eggshells. In collaboration with Dr. Sally Solomon of the University of Glasgow, during Chan's sabbatical leave.
13. Factors affecting hatching success of sea turtle eggs. Funded by the Terengganu State Government.
14. Sex-ratio studies on Malaysian sea turtles. Granted by both IRPA and Esso Production Malaysia Sdn. Bhd.
15. Effects of fishing gear on sea turtles, grant from Esso Production Malaysia Sdn. Bhd.
16. Association of sea turtles with offshore platforms. Esso Production Malaysia Sdn. Bhd. as the collaborator.
17. Effects of oil pollution on sea turtles. A review of published information.
18. Setiu river terrapin recovery project. Seed money has been awarded by the Turtle Conservation Fund (TCF), Turtle Survival Alliance and the Cleveland Metroparks Zoo in the US.
19. River terrapin research and conservation project in the Kemaman River, Terengganu. Funded by the Mohamed bin Zayed Species Conservation Fund.

== Publications ==
=== Journals, Books and Monographs ===
1. Chan, E.H. 2013. A report on the first 16 years of a long-term marine turtle conservation project in Malaysia. (pdf) "Asian Journal of Conservation Biology", December 2013. 2(2):129–135.
2. Chan, E.H. and P.N. Chen. 2011. Getting to know the river terrapins of Malaysia. "Malaysian Naturalist", 64(3).
3. Chan, E.H. and P.N. Chen. 2011. Nesting activity and clutch size of the southern river terrapin, Batagur affinis (Cantor, 1847) in the Setiu River, Terengganu, Malaysia. "Chelonian Conservation and Biology", 10(1):129–132. 2011.
4. Chan, E.H. 2010. A 16-year record of green and hawksbill turtle nesting activity at Chagar Hutang Turtle Sanctuary, Redang Island, Malaysia (PDF). "Indian Ocean Turtle Newsletter". (12):1–5.
5. Chan, E.H. 2010. Little Turtle Messenger. Tan Yi Sin (ill). MPH Group Publishing Sdn. Bhd. 34pp. ISBN 978-967-5222-73-3.
6. Pilcher, N.J, E.H. Chan and R. Trono. 2008. Mass turtle poaching: A case study for Southeast Asia (PDF). "SWOT: The State of the World’s Sea Turtles", III:26–27.
7. Kuchling, G., E.H. Chan and C.L. Soh. 2007. Temperature dependent sex determination studies in the River Terrapin, range country: Malaysia (PDF). "Turtle Survival Alliance Newsletter". August 2007.
8. Chan, E.H. 2006. Marine turtles in Malaysia: On the verge of extinction? (PDF) "Aquatic Ecosystems Health and Management". 9(2):175–184.
9. Chan, E.H. 2005. Profile of the Month – February 2005 (PDF). Indian Ocean-South East Asia Marine Turtle Memorandum of Understanding (IOSEA).
10. Chan, E.H. 2004. Turtles in Trouble (PDF). Siri Syarahan Inaugural KUSTEM: (7) 28pp.
11. Chan, E.H. and C.R. Shepherd. 2002. Marine Turtles: The Scenario in Southeast Asia (PDF). "Tropical Coasts", 9(2):38–43.
12. Chan E.H. & Liew, H.C. 2002. Saving the turtles saves ourselves (JPEG). "UN Chronicle", XXXIX(1):38–39.
13. Chan, E.H. and H.C. Liew. 2001. Sea Turtles. pp. 74–75 in Ong, J.E. and W.K. Gong (eds.). "The Encyclopedia of Malaysia", 6 : The Seas". Editions Didier Millet. 144 pp.
14. Chan, E.H. 2000. And the giants ascended no more (PDF). Millennium Marker story. 10 January 2000, Section 2, "The STAR", p 8 & 10.
15. Chan, E. H., J. Joseph and H.C. Liew. 1999. A study on the hawksbill turtles (Eretmochelys imbricata) of Gulisaan, Sabah Turtle Islands, Malaysia (PDF). "Sabah Parks Journal". 2:11–23.
16. Chai, S.S., H.C. Liew, E.H. Chan and J. Bali. 1999. A comparison of hatch success and sex ratios of green turtle (Chelonia mydas) eggs incubated under in-situ conditions and hatcheries at Pulau Talang-Talang Kecil, Sarawak. "Hornbill". 3:2–21.
17. Wong, C.H.L., E.H. Chan, H.C. Liew and J. Bali. 1999. Tagging and nesting studies of green turtles (Chelonia at Pulau Talang-Talang Kecil, Sarawak, ibid:22–36.
18. Chan, E. H. and H.C. Liew. 1999. Hawksbill turtles, Eretmochelys imbricata nesting on Redang Island, Terengganu, Malaysia from 1993 to 1997 (PDF). "Chelonian Conservation and Biology". 3(2):326–329.
19. Chan, E. H. and H.C. Liew. 1996. Decline of the leatherback population in Terengganu, Malaysia, 1956–1995 (PDF). "Chel Cons & Biol". 2(2):196–203.
20. Chan, E. H. and H.C. Liew. 1996. A Management Plan for the Green and Hawksbill Turtle Populations of the Sabah Turtle Islands. "A Report to Sabah Parks". SEATRU, Faculty of Applied Science and Technology, Universiti Pertanian Malaysia Terengganu. 102 pp.
21. Eckert, S.A., H.C. Liew, K.L. Eckert and E.H. Chan. 1996. Shallow water diving by leatherback turtles in the South China Sea (PDF). "Chel Cons & Biol". 2(2):237–243.
22. Luschi, P., F. Papi, H.C. Liew, E.H. Chan and F. Bonadonna. 1996. Long-distance migration and homing after displacement in the green turtle (Chelonia mydas): a satellite tracking study (PDF). "J. Comp. Physiol. A". 178:447–552.
23. Chan, E.H. and H.C. Liew. 1995. Incubation temperatures and sex-ratios in the Malaysian leatherback turtle, Dermochelys coriacea (PDF). "Biol. Conserv." 2(2):196–203.
24. Papi, F., H.C. Liew, P. Luschi and E.H. Chan. 1995. Long-range migratory travel of a green turtle tracked by satellite: evidence for navigational ability in the open sea (PDF). "Marine Biology". V. 122:171–175.
25. Chan, E.H. 1993. The conservation-related biology and ecology of the leatherback turtle, Dermochelys coriacea, in Rantau Abang, Terengganu, Malaysia (PhD dissertation), Kagoshima University, Kagoshima, Japan.
26. Chan, E.H. And H.C. Liew. 1989. The Leatherback Turtle : A Malaysian Heritage. Tropical Press Sdn. Bhd. 49 pp.
27. Chan, E.H. and H.C. Liew. 1989. Charting the movements of a sea giant. "Research News", Universiti Pertanian Malaysia, 3(4):1,7 & 8.
28. Chan, E.H. and S.E. Solomon. 1989. The structure and function of the eggshell of the leatherback turtle, (Dermochelys coriacea) from Malaysia, with notes on infective fungal forms (PDF). "Animal Technology", 40(2):91–102.
29. Chan E.H. 1989. White spot development, incubation and hatching success of leatherback turtle (Dermochelys coriacea) eggs from Rantau Abang, Malaysia (PDF). "Copeia", 1989(1):42–47.
30. Chan, E.H. 1988. A note on the feeding of leatherback (Dermochelys coriacea) hatchlings (PDF). "Pertanika", 11(1):147–149.
31. Chan, E.H., H.C. Liew and A.G. Mazlan. 1988. The incidental capture of sea turtles in fishing gear in Terengganu, Malaysia (PDF). "Biol. Conserv.", 43(1):1–7.
32. Chan, E.H. 1985. Twin embryos in unhatched egg of Dermochelys coriacea. "Marine Turtle Newsletter", (32):2–3.
33. Chan, E.H., H.U. Salleh and H.C. Liew. 1985. Effects of handling on hatchability of eggs of the leatherback turtle, Dermochelys coriacea (L.) (PDF). "Pertanika", 8(2):265–271.
34. Chan, E. H. and H.C. Liew. 1996. A Management Plan for the Green and Hawksbill Turtle Populations of the Sabah Turtle Islands. (A Report to Sabah Parks, 102 pp.) SEATRU, Faculty of Applied Science and Technology, Universiti Pertanian Malaysia Terengganu.
