= Nicole Viloteau =

French photographer and explorer

- Education: Beaux-Arts de Paris
- Occupations: Photographer and explorer
- Known for: Called the "Snake Woman"

Nicole Viloteau is a French photographer and explorer who has a passion for herpetology, which, several times, has nearly caused her premature death. She has photographed reptiles, insects and threatened tropics of Australia, Africa, Asia, South America and Madagascar.

== Biography ==
Nicole Viloteau, sometimes nicknamed the "snake woman," tamed her first lizard when she was eight. Her life's work reflects her passion for reptiles and their natural habitats.

She graduated in fine arts from the École des Beaux-Arts in Paris, and became a photographer when she was 20. Since then, she has used her skills to demonstrate the decline of the world's remaining wildernesses. To do so, she photographs reptiles and tropical flora and fauna that she finds during her global explorations.

According to one biography, her subjects range from "king snakes in the deserts of Northern Australia and vipers in the jungles of Gabon and Madagascar, to the giant dragons of Komodo. Yet she returns to the wildest places on earth again and again, fired by her desire to learn more about these creatures that inspire such primal fear and loathing."

She has suffered life-threatening injuries: a bite by a rattlesnake, another on the thigh by a mamba, a goring episode by a wild buffalo, being wounded by poachers and suffering from tropical diseases such as malaria.

Viloteau was 25 when she was bitten in 1971. While sitting in a hot car with two other people, she began to inventory her collection of snakes. She opened one bag expecting to see a harmless snake but it had been mislabeled. Instead, the captive reptile was a highly venomous North American rattlesnake. It bit her on the lip and she was rushed to the hospital in critical condition, but the necessary antivenom was not available there (bites from North American rattlesnakes are rare in France and Germany). The closest source was in Geneva, Switzerland. With French military assistance, the antivenom was retrieved and administered, but Viloteau suffered an allergic reaction. She was saved by doctors who administered a strong anticoagulant. Her recovery required a hospital stay of two months.

Viloteau is also a filmmaker. Of the documentaries she has directed, the best known is "The Komodo Dragons."

== Selected publications ==
Viloteau has published several bestselling books in French. Secret Jungle (2001) was also published in English.

- Viloteau, Nicole. "Les Amis du Muséum National d’Histoire Naturelle." (2012).
- Viloteau, Nicole. "Les sorciers de la pleine lune." (1990).
- Viloteau, Nicole. "Madagascar: l'île aux sorciers." (2001).
- Viloteau, Nicole. Les dragons de Komodo. Arthaud, 1992.
- Viloteau, Nicole. Brousses lointaines. Arthaud, 2005.
