= Marie Phisalix =

French herpetologist

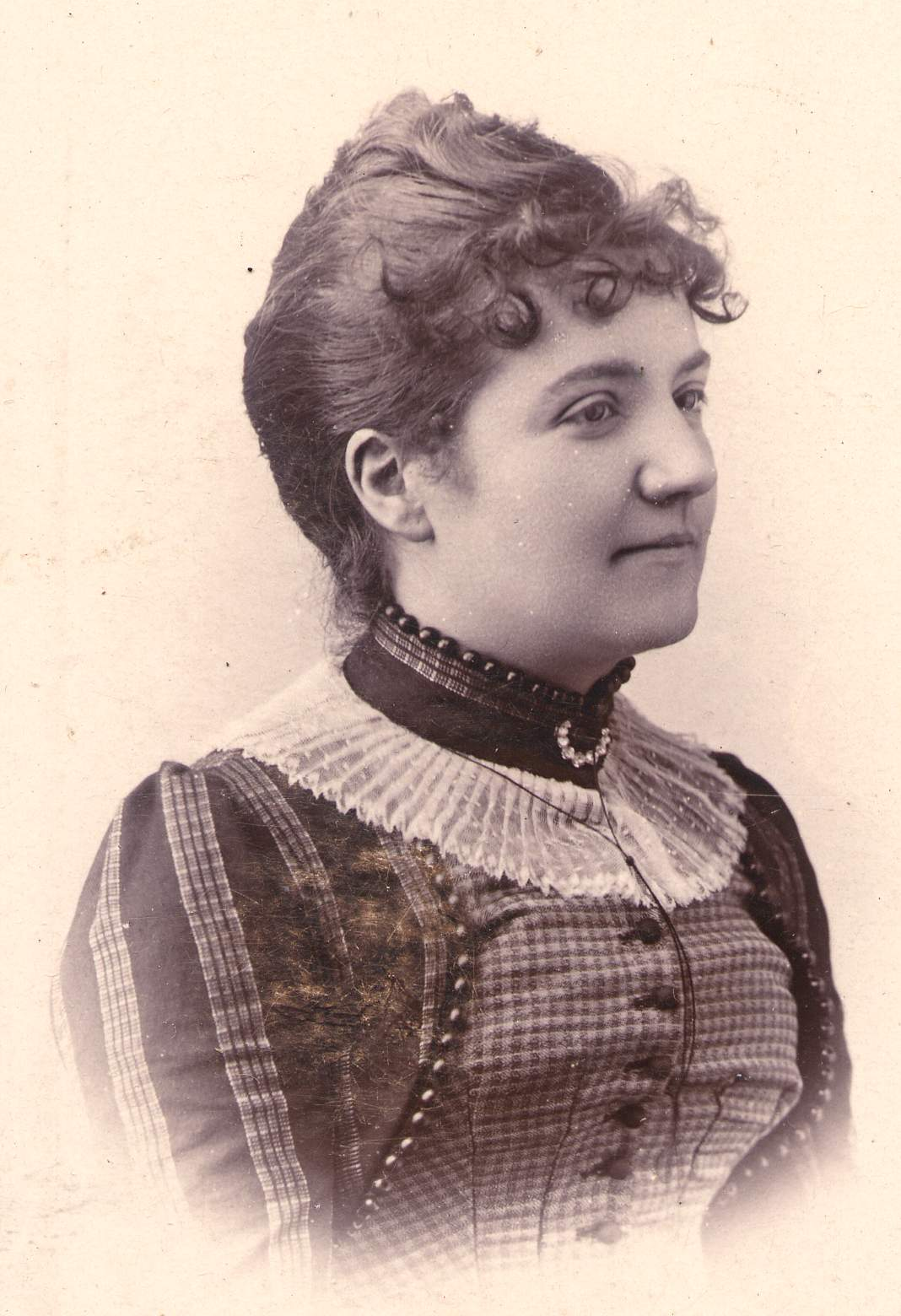
- Phisalix in 1895
- Born: 20 November 1861
- Died: 18 January 1946 (aged 84)
- Education: École normale supérieure de jeunes filles
- Known for: Snake venom
- Awards: Chevalier de la Legion d'honneur (1923)
- Scientific career
- Workplaces: National Museum of Natural History

Marie Félicie Phisalix (née Picot) (20 November 1861 — 18 January 1946) was a French scientist who researched snake venom and antidotes. She was awarded the Chevalier de la Legion d'honneur in 1923.

== Early life and education ==
Phisalix was part of the Jurassic separatism movement. She was born in Besançon, the daughter of Camille Joséph Picot and Marie Josephine Dalloz. From 1882, she studied at the École normale supérieure de jeunes filles, which had recently been established. She qualified in 1889, where she taught herself and worked toward a medical degree. She was one of the first French women to become a doctor of medicine. She defended her thesis Histological, embryological and physiological research on the venom glands of the terrestrial salamander in 1900. Phisalix began to work on snake venom antidotes, and won a prize for her doctoral research on reptile and amphibian venoms. She identified that venom function is not adapted to attack or defence.

== Research and career ==
In 1910, Phisalix joined the National Museum of Natural History, where she led the laboratory of ichthyology and herpetology. She was interested in the biological role of venom function. She studied the comparative anatomy of the organs that create venom as well as the pathology of their delivery. She became interested in how venom was presented in different species. She focused on lower vertebrates, higher vertebrates with natural immunity as well as parasitic protozoa. She studied the blood and tissue of lower vertebrates and their venom and anti-venom. She showed that the production of venom, which is accompanied by natural immunity, is a defense strategy.

Phisalix was a feminist, who served as the Vice President of the Association for the Improvement of the Status of Women. She led the 1945 meeting of the French League for the Rights of Women.

=== Awards and honours ===
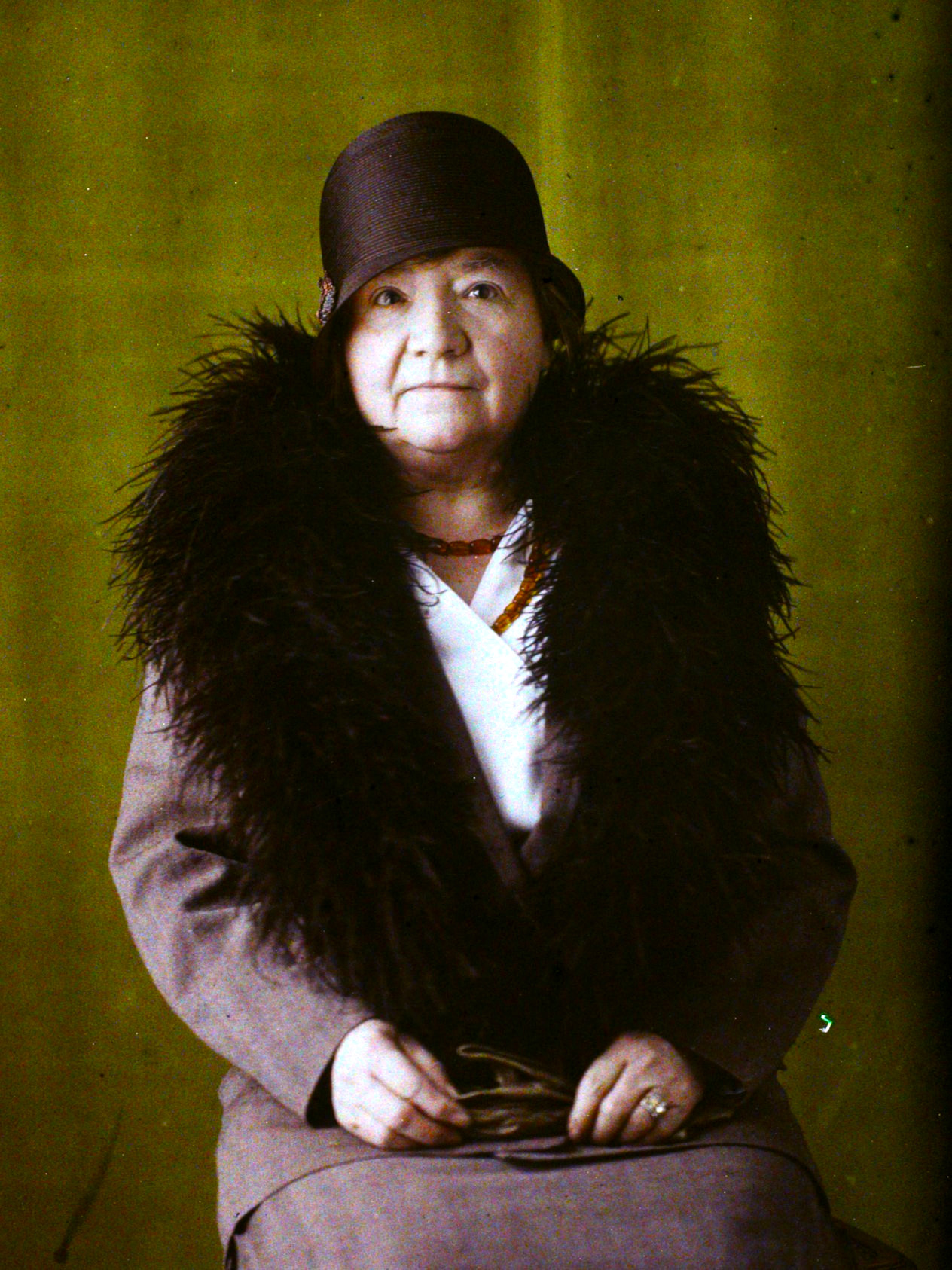
Autochrome by Georges Chevalier, 1929

Phisalix was awarded the French Academy of Sciences Prix Bréant in 1916 and 1922. In 1923 she was awarded the Chevalier de la Legion d'honneur, and the Académie française Grand Prix Lasserre in 1928. She was proposed for membership of the Académie Nationale de Médecine, but was not accepted.

=== Books ===
- Phisalix, Marie (1922). Animaux venimeux et venins. Masson & co. ISBN 978-1160786973.
- Phisalix, Marie (1940). Vipères de France : leur biologie, leur appareil venimeux et le traitement de leurs morsures Marie Phisalix. Stock (Delamain et Boutelleau).

== Personal life ==
Phisalix was married to Césaire Phisalix, a French biologist.
