= Alan H. Savitzky =

American herpetologist (born 1950)

- Born: Alan Howard Savitzky; June 23, 1950 (age 76); Danbury, Connecticut, United States
- Education: University of Colorado; University of Kansas
- Known for: Research on the morphology and evolution of snakes
- Scientific career
- Fields: Herpetology, Biology
- Workplaces: Cornell University; Old Dominion University; Utah State University
- Website: Savitzky Lab – Utah State University

Alan Howard "Al" Savitzky (born June 23, 1950, in Danbury, Connecticut) is an American herpetologist and professor of biology. His research focuses primarily on the morphology, evolution, and biology of snakes.

== Biography ==
Savitzky earned his Bachelor of Arts in biology from the University of Colorado in 1972. He received his Master of Arts in 1974 and his Ph.D. in biology in 1979 from the University of Kansas, where his dissertation was titled The origin of the New World proteroglyphous snakes and its bearing on the study of venom delivery systems in snakes.

From 1976 to 1978, Savitzky worked as a predoctoral fellow at the Smithsonian Institution, continuing his doctoral research in the Department of Amphibians and Reptiles at the National Museum of Natural History. After earning his doctorate, he taught at Cornell University from 1979 to 1982. In 2003, he served as a visiting professor at the Kyoto University Museum in Japan, and from 2008 to 2010, he was a program director in the Division of Biological Infrastructure (Human Resource Cluster) at the National Science Foundation.

Savitzky joined the Old Dominion University faculty in 1982, where he was appointed professor of biological sciences in 2008. In 2011, he became professor and department head of biology at the Utah State University.

He has served on the boards of several national and international scientific organizations, including as president of the Society for the Study of Amphibians and Reptiles and the American Society of Ichthyologists and Herpetologists. He is currently treasurer of the World Congress of Herpetology and a member of the board of directors of the American Institute for Biological Sciences.

== Research ==
Savitzky's early research centered on comparative morphology and systematics, focusing on feeding morphology and the evolution of colubrid snakes. His later work included embryonic development of snakes and conservation biology, notably concerning the threatened timber rattlesnake (Crotalus horridus). He also contributed to a major collaborative study on the chemical defense mechanisms of the Asian tiger keelback (Rhabdophis tigrinus), which sequesters steroid toxins from the toads it preys upon for its own defense.

Together with Hobart Muir Smith, Savitzky described the snake species Tantilla briggsi (1971) and the spiny lizard Sceloporus adleri (1974).
