= Lee Fitzgerald =

Professor of Zoology at Texas A&M University

- Born: 1955 (age 70–71); Pasadena, Texas, United States
- Education: Pasadena High School; Stephen F. Austin State University University of New Mexico
- Known for: study of reptile ecological niches
- Scientific career
- Fields: Herpetology
- Workplaces: Texas A&M University

Lee Fitzgerald (born 1955) is Professor of Zoology and Faculty Curator of Amphibians and Reptiles in the Department of Wildlife and Fisheries Sciences at Texas A&M University. His biological specialty is the evolutionary ecology and conservation biology of amphibians and reptiles (herpetology). Fitzgerald is a former editor of Herpetological Monographs.

== Life ==
Fitzgerald was born in Pasadena, Texas. He attended Pasadena High School and received an undergraduate degree at Stephen F. Austin University of Texas. From 1979 until 1980, he was in the Peace Corps in El Salvador and worked with iguanas, but returned early because of the civil war there. In 1980, he traveled to Paraguay and worked with Norman J. Scott. He then studied at the University of New Mexico under Scott and finished his masters project in Venezuela before beginning his doctoral studies with Howard Snell. After receiving his PhD in 1993, he did post-doctoral work on Tegu lizard ecology and sustainable use as a conservation strategy in Paraguay. In 1996, Fitzgerald joined the faculty of Texas A&M University, where he is Professor of Zoology and Faculty Curator of Amphibians and Reptiles in the Department of Wildlife and Fisheries Sciences.

== Research ==
Fitzgerald and his research group work in Latin America and the southwestern United States. Their fieldwork concentrates on the ecological factors affecting reptiles, most notably the Tupinambis lizard and the dunes sagebrush lizard, Sceloporus arenicolus.

== Selected publications ==
- Fitzgerald, L.A.1 and contributors. (in press). Finding and Capturing Reptiles, Chapter 5 In M.S. Foster et al. (eds.) Measuring and Monitoring Biological Diversity, Standard Methods for Reptiles. Smithsonian Institution Press, Washington, DC. (1Chapter coordinator)
- Fitzgerald L.A. (in press). Studying and Monitoring Exploited Species. (in press). Chapter 12 In M.S. Foster et al. (eds.) Measuring and Monitoring Biological Diversity, Standard Methods for Reptiles. Smithsonian Institution Press, Washington, DC.
- Dayton, G.H. and L.A. Fitzgerald. 2011. The advantage of no defense: predation enhances cohort survival in a desert amphibian. Aquatic Ecology 45:325-333. (pdf)
- Fitzgerald, L.A. and R.E. Nelson. 2011. Thermal biology and temperature-based habitat selection in a large aquatic ectotherm, the alligator snapping turtle, Macroclemys temminckii. Journal of Thermal Biology 36:160-166. (pdf)
- Laurencio, L.R. and L.A. Fitzgerald. 2010. Atlas of distribution and habitat of the dunes sagebrush lizard (Sceloporus arenicolus) in New Mexico. Texas Cooperative Wildlife Collection, Department of Wildlife and Fisheries Sciences, Texas A&M University, College Station, TX 77843–2258. ISBN 978-0-615-40937-5.
- Fitzgerald, L.A. and Amanda L. Stronza. 2009. Applied Biodiversity Science: Integrating ecology, culture, and governance for effective conservation. Interciencia 34(8):1-8. (pdf)
- Chan, L., L.A. Fitzgerald, Zamudio K. 2009. The scale of genetic differentiation in the Dunes Sagebrush-Lizard (Sceloporus arenicolus), an endemic habitat specialist. Conservation Genetics 10:131-142. (pdf)
- Fitzgerald, L.A. and C.W. Painter. 2009. Sceloporus arenicolus. Pages 230-233 In. Lizards of the American Southwest: A Photographic Field Guide. Lawrence L.C. Jones and Rob Lovich (eds.).
- Fitzgerald, L.A. 2009. Sceloporus merriami. in. Lizards of the American Southwest: A Photographic Field Guide. Lawrence L.C. Jones and Rob Lovich (eds.).
- Fitzgerald, L.A. 2009. Plestiodon tetragrammus. Pages 463–465. Lizards of the American Southwest: A Photographic Field Guide. Lawrence L.C. Jones and Rob Lovich (eds.).
- Fitzgerald, L.A. 2004 Amphibians and Reptiles. Chapter 10, In N. Wilkins (ed.), Texas Master Naturalists Curriculum Book.
- Fitzgerald, L.A. 2003. Whiptail lizards, tegus and allies (Teiidae). Grzimek's Animal Life Encyclopedia. (pdf)
- Fitzgerald, L.A. 2003. Microteiids (Gymnophthalmidae). Grzimek's Animal Life Encyclopedia. (pdf)
- Fitzgerald, L.A. and C.W. Painter. 2000. Rattlesnake commercialization: long-term trends, issues, and implications for conservation. Wildlife Society Bulletin 28 (1): 235–253. (pdf)
- Fitzgerald, L.A., J.A. Cook, and A.L. Aquino. 1999. The molecular phylogenetics and conservation of Tupinambis (Sauria: Teiidae). Copeia 1999 (4): 894-905 (pdf)
- Fitzgerald, L.A., F. Cruz, and G. Perotti. 1999. Phenology of a lizard assemblage in the dry chaco of Argentina. Journal of Herpetology 33 (4): 526–535. (pdf)
- Painter, C.W. and Fitzgerald L.A. 1999. Crotalus atrox. Morphology. Herpetological Review 30(1): 44
