= Leslie Rissler =

American biologist

Leslie Jane Rissler
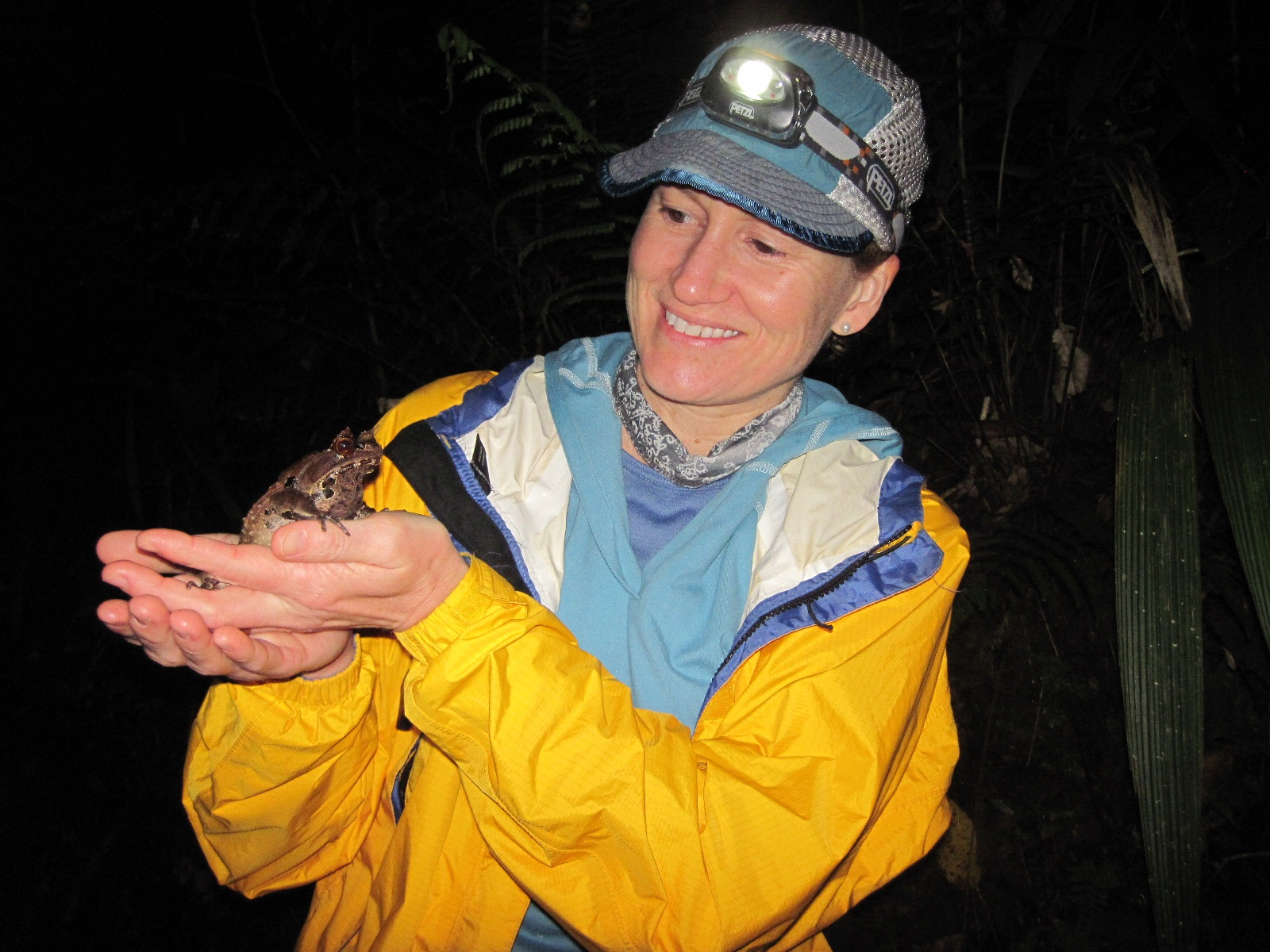
- Rissler with Kobayashi's horned frog in Borneo, 2012.
- Born: May 11, 1969 (age 57)

Leslie Jane Rissler (b May 11, 1969) is an American biologist best known for her work on amphibian and reptile biogeography, evolutionary ecology, systematics, and conservation, and for her strong advocacy of improving the public’s understanding and appreciation of evolution. She is currently Program Officer in the Evolutionary Processes Cluster of the Division of Environmental Biology and Directorate of Biological Sciences at the National Science Foundation.

Rissler was formerly at the University of Alabama (2003–2015), where she was a Professor in the Department of Biological Sciences and Curator of Herpetology.

== Education ==
Rissler received a BSc (magna cum laude) from Indiana State University in 1992, an MSc from Utah State University in 1995, and her Ph.D. from the University of Virginia in 2000, where she was an ARCS fellow, studying under Drs. Henry Wilbur and Douglas Taylor. She did her postgraduate research at the Museum of Vertebrate Zoology of the University of California, Berkeley, where she was an NSF postdoctoral fellow in bioinformatics under Drs. David Wake and Craig Moritz.

== Scientific work ==
Rissler has published over 35 papers on a diverse range of biological questions, and systems pertaining to the distribution of organisms and the mechanisms generating species range limits. Much of the work has direct implications for conservation and biological systematics. She focuses on comparative phylogeography and the role of biological and physical factors influencing range limits, and has developed methods in the field of comparative phylogeography (including using models combining natural history and environmental data) to help clarify the biogeographic distribution and evolutionary relationships of organisms. She has been involved in the discovery of new species, including the northern pygmy salamander (Desmognathus organi) and the Atlantic Coast leopard frog in the New York region (Lithobates klauffeldi) and also conducts evolutionary analyses on federally threatened species like the Red Hills salamander (Phaeognathus hubrichti) and the flattened musk turtle (Sternotherus depressus).

Rissler has served as an associate editor for Molecular Ecology, Journal of Biogeography, and Herpetological Conservation and Biology. She was on the Evolution Editorial Board for AXIOS.

Rissler was the recipient of the 2020 Stephen J. Gould Prize from the Society for the Study of Evolution for her contributions to public understanding of evolutionary biology.

== Public work (outreach) ==
Rissler has focused much of her outreach on improving the public’s understanding of evolution. She is Science Advisor and Co-Producer of the webpage and television production Speaking Evolution. She co-founded and served as Chair of the Evolution Working Group for several years on the University of Alabama campus. Rissler’s work has also involved empirical study of the role of religion and education on college students’ understanding of evolution. She is also involved in conservation biology and biodiversity outreach.
