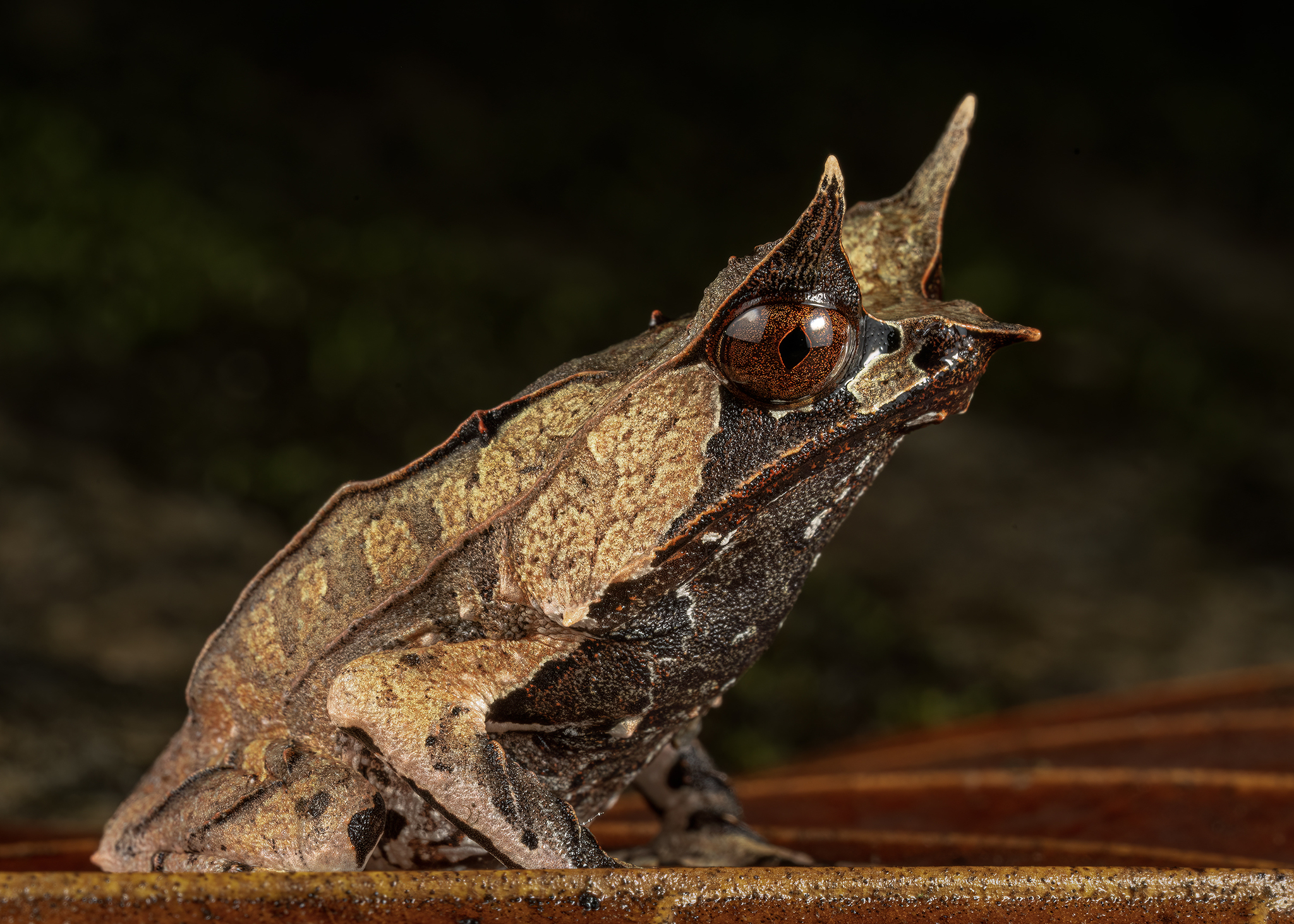

Conservation status
- Least Concern (IUCN 3.1)

Scientific classification
- Kingdom: Animalia
- Phylum: Chordata
- Class: Amphibia
- Order: Anura
- Family: Megophryidae
- Genus: Pelobatrachus
- Species: P. nasutus

Binomial name
- Pelobatrachus nasutus (Schlegel, 1858)

Synonyms
- Megophrys nasuta

= Long-nosed horned frog =

Species of amphibian

The long-nosed horned frog (Pelobatrachus nasutus), also known as the Malayan horned frog or Malayan leaf frog, is a species of frog restricted to the rainforest areas of southern Thailand and Peninsular Malaysia to Singapore, Sumatra, and Borneo. However, records from Thailand to the Sunda Shelf may apply to another, possibly unnamed species.

== Taxonomy ==
Formerly placed in the genus Megophrys, it was reclassified into the genus Pelobatrachus in 2021.

== Description ==
This species is a large frog ranging from 100–120 mm in length. They are light to dark brown on the dorsal surface with varying patterns and camouflage very well with the forest floor. The throat is black-dark brown and diffuses into cream-yellow halfway along the ventral surface. The upper eyelids and snout are drawn out into long triangular projections, forming what looks like "horns", giving them their common name. There are two pairs of dorsolateral skin folds running down this species back. One pair starts behind the eye and ends near the groin, the other pair starts at corner of the eye and ends roughly halfway between the armpit and groin. The dorsum has randomly scattered, enlarged tubercles. Arms and legs are barred with skin folds and are mottled cream and different shades of brown. The toes are slightly webbed and the fingers are free from webbing. The tympanum is indistinct and the iris is golden brown.

== Ecology and behaviour ==
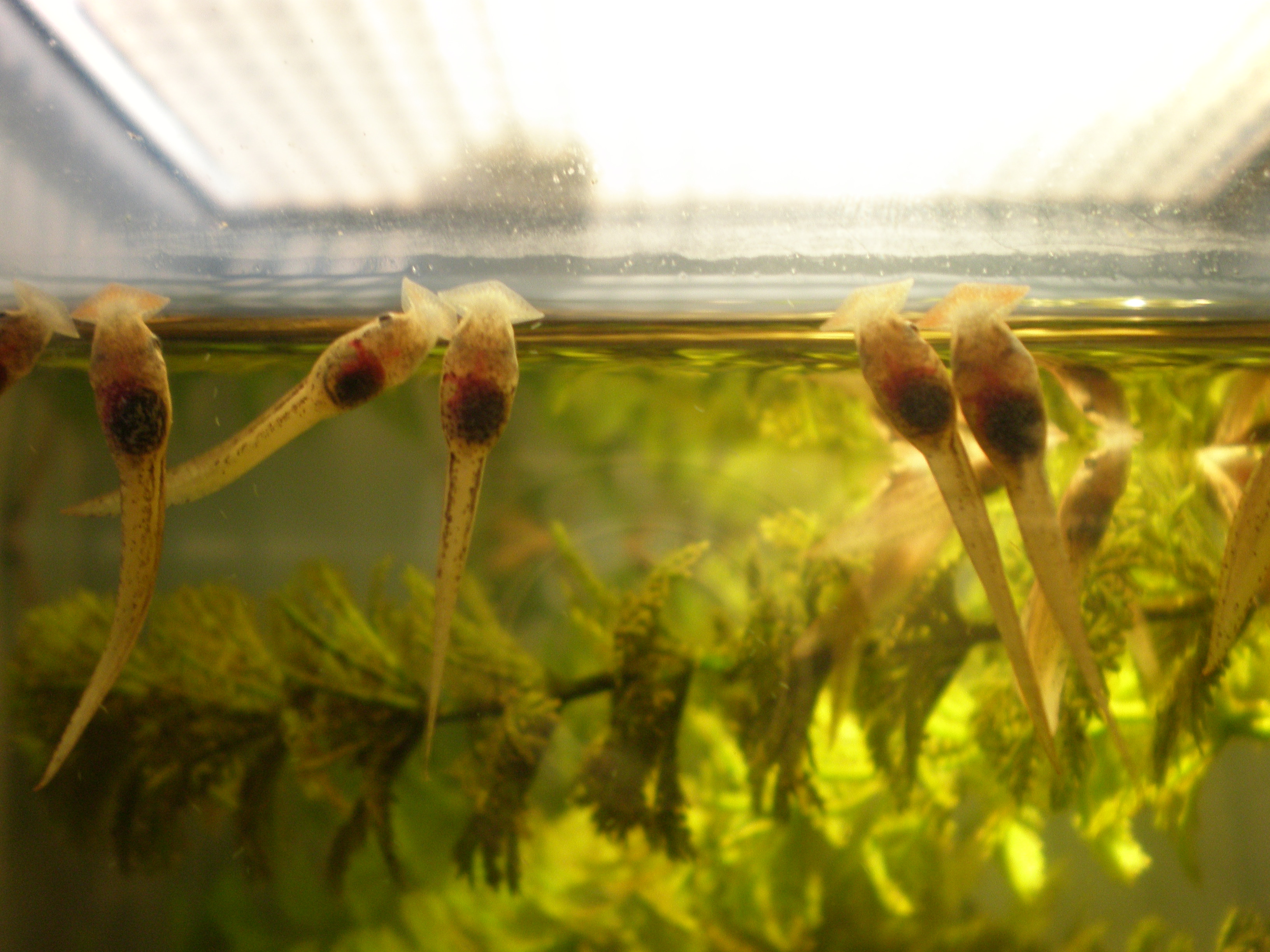
Tadpoles of P. nasutus

This species lives in permanently damp and cool lowland and submontane rainforests among leaf litter. The call is a loud, resonating, metallic "honk" or "henk". Breeding takes place in streams, female frogs attach the eggs to the underside of partially or full submerged rocks or logs. The capsules are large and few in number. This species may lie still on the forest floor waiting for an unsuspecting prey item to pass by, they then lash out and engulf the prey. They typically feed on spiders, small rodents, lizards and other frogs.

== Similar species ==
This species is unlikely to get confused with any other genus of frog and can be distinguished from other species of the genera Pelobatrachus and Megophrys by the elongated nose and the two pairs of dorsolateral skin folds.
