= Margaret Stewart (herpetologist) =

American herpetologist

- Born: 6 February 1927; Guilford County, North Carolina, USA
- Died: 2 August 2006 (aged 79)
- Education: Cornell University
- Scientific career
- Fields: Herpetology
- Thesis: Certain aspects of the natural history and development of the northern two-lined salamander, Eurycea bislineata bislineata (Green), in the Ithaca, New York, region (1956)

Margaret "Meg" McBride Stewart (6 Feb. 1927 – 2 Aug. 2006) was an American herpetologist, known for her research on the amphibians of Malawi, the Caribbean, and the United States. She was a professor at the State University of New York at Albany. She served as president of the American Society of Ichthyologists and Herpetologists and the Society for the Study of Amphibians and Reptiles. The puddle frog Phrynobatrachus stewartae was named in her honour.

== Life and career ==
Stewart was born on a farm in Guilford County, North Carolina, to Mary Ellen Morrow and David Henry Stewart. She attended Alamance High School, graduating in 1944. She earned her undergraduate degree from the University of North Carolina's Woman's College in 1948, and her Master of Arts in Zoology from University of North Carolina at Chapel Hill in 1951. Her Master thesis work had originally been intended to be a study on behaviour of Plethodon glutinosus, but was later changed to be a study on photoperiod response in Ambystoma opacum—this would become her first published paper.

After completing her master's degree, Stewart taught at Catawba College in Salisbury, North Carolina for two years, where she developed a love for undergraduate teaching, but also realised that she wanted to pursue both teaching and research. So, she decided to pursue a PhD at Cornell University. Her work focussed on the natural history of Eurycea bislineata bislineata. She finished her PhD in 1956, and, after a brief trip to Europe, joined the faculty of the New York State College for Teachers at Albany (now SUNY at Albany).

Stewart married Paul Lemon, professor for plant ecology at Albany. In 1963, she obtained a Fulbright Fellowship to travel to Africa, and the two of them travelled to Malawi for a year, where she worked on the herpetofauna of the Nyika Plateau. They divorced after their return from Malawi. She later married George E. Martin, a mathematician at University at Albany. Stewart produced a fieldguide to the amphibians of Malawi in 1967, widely regarded as a landmark work in the herpetology of eastern Africa. Yet, she herself never returned to Africa. Instead, she began to work on Caribbean frogs, looking first at competition between native and invasive species in Jamaica, ultimately broadening her scope to include the rest of the Caribbean, and the United States as well. Particular emphasis was placed on Eleutherodactylus coqui, to which she had been introduced by her friend Terry Nesslinger.

Stewart played a major role in the American Society of Ichthyologists and Herpetologists (ASIH): she served variously on the Committee on Environmental Quality (1974–1979), the Board of Governors (1975–1980), as president (elected 1996), and finally as official Historian of the society. She also served as president for the Society for the Study of Amphibians and Reptiles (SSAR), elected in 1979.

Stewart retired in 1997, but continued to develop the program in Biodiversity, Conservation, and Policy at the University at Albany. In 2003, Stewart donated an endowment to Albany, from which the Margaret M. Stewart Graduate Scholarship in Biodiversity, Conservation, and Policy was established.

During her career, Stewart faced numerous hurdles from sexism. In the 1950s, it was still rare for women to hold a PhD. When applying for her position at Albany, she also applied elsewhere, but found that other institutions either said 'we don't hire women', or paid women 20% less than they paid men.

Stewart died of pancreatic cancer on 2 August 2006.

== Honours and awards ==
In 1977, Stewart was awarded the title of "Distinguished Teaching Professor" at the University at Albany.

In 1987, Stewart was given the Citizen Laureate award of the University at Albany.

In 1996, Stewart was awarded an honorary doctorate by the University of Mayaguez for her work on Eleutherodactylus coqui.

In 1997, Stewart was awarded the Oak Leaf Award of The Nature Conservancy, in recognition of her contributions to the Eastern New York Chapter.

In June 2004, Stewart was named a citizen member of the Albany Pine Bush Preserve Commission after twelve years in its service.

In 2005, Stewart was awarded the Robert K. Johnson Award and Henry S. Fitch Award of the American Society of Ichthyologists and Herpetologists, recognising her contributions both to the society, and to the excellence of her herpetological research.

In June 2006, Stewart was elected an alumna member of the Epsilon chapter of Phi Beta Kappa at UNC-Greensboro.

The puddle frog Phrynobatrachus stewartae was named in honour of Stewart, as is an interpretive trail in the Albany Pine Bush and a visitor centre at Sam's Point Preserve.

In 2019, the American Society of Ichthyologists and Herpetologists created the Margaret M. Stewart Achievement Award for Excellence in Ichthyology or Herpetology, in honour of Stewart and her contributions both to the society and to the field of herpetology.
