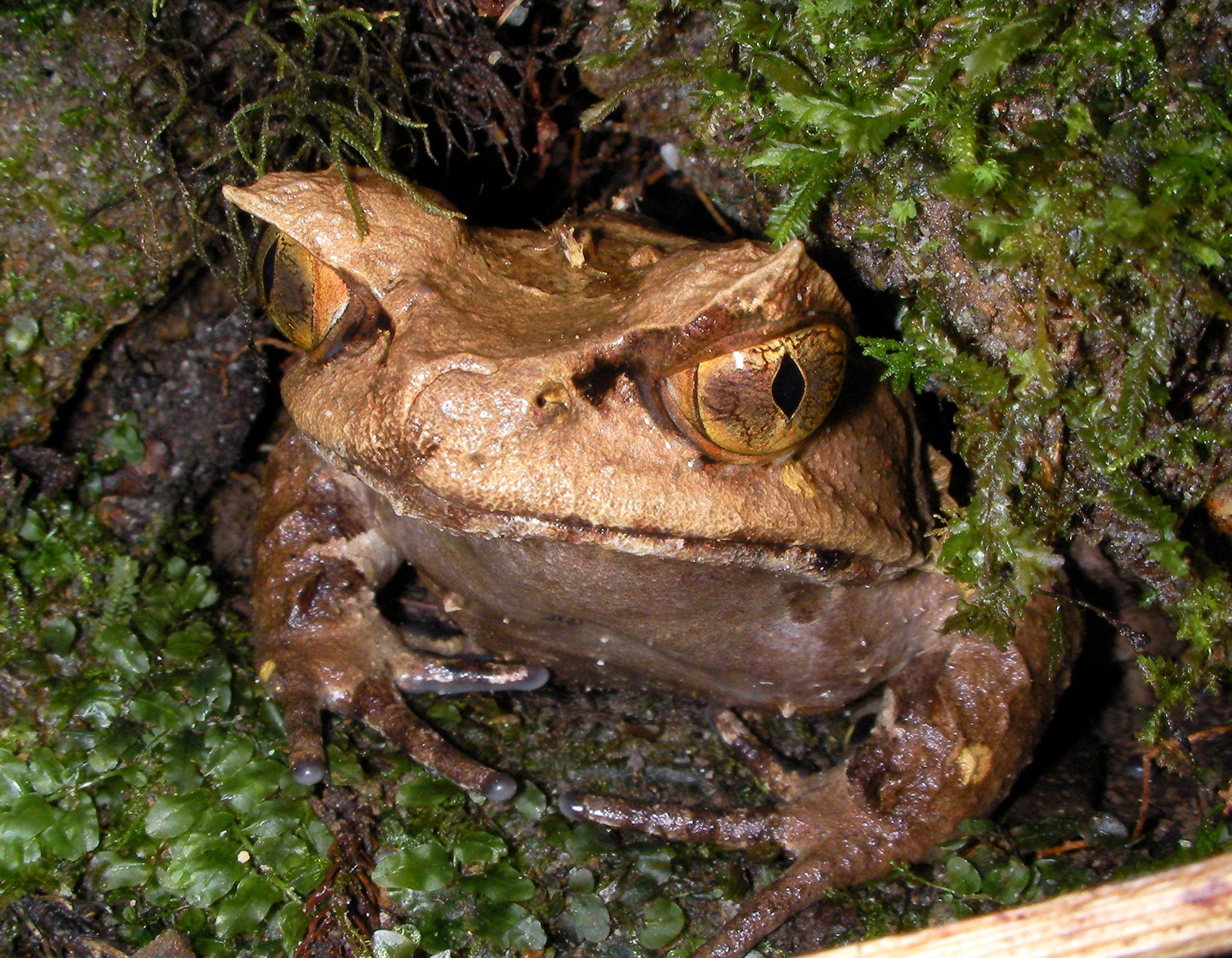

Conservation status
- Least Concern (IUCN 3.1)

Scientific classification
- Kingdom: Animalia
- Phylum: Chordata
- Class: Amphibia
- Order: Anura
- Family: Megophryidae
- Genus: Pelobatrachus
- Species: P. kobayashii

Binomial name
- Pelobatrachus kobayashii (Malkmus and Matsui, 1997)

Synonyms
- Megophrys kobayashii Malkmus and Matsui, 1997

= Kobayashi's horned frog =

Species of amphibian

Kobayashi's horned frog (Pelobatrachus kobayashii) is a species of amphibian in the family Megophryidae. It is endemic to Sabah in Malaysia, including Mount Kinabalu. Its natural habitats are subtropical or tropical moist montane forests and rivers.

Formerly placed in the genus Megophrys, it was reclassified into the genus Pelobatrachus in 2021.
