= Márcio Roberto Costa Martins =

Brazilian herpetologist and ecologist

- Born: 13 March 1959
- Education: State University of Campinas
- Known for: Ecology and conservation of amphibians and reptiles
- Scientific career
- Fields: Herpetology, Ecology, Conservation biology
- Workplaces: São Paulo State University
- Doctoral advisor: Ivan Sazima

Márcio Roberto Costa Martins (born 13 March 1959) is a Brazilian herpetologist, ecologist and conservationist.

== Biography ==
Martins began his studies in 1980 at the State University of Campinas, where he earned a bachelor's degree in biology in 1984 and a Master of Science degree in ecology in 1990. From 1986 to 1987, he worked as a researcher at the National Institute of Amazonian Research (INPA). From 1991 to 1994 and again from 1994 to 1995, he served as a visiting professor at the Federal University of Amazonas (UFAM). In 1994, he received his Ph.D. under the supervision of Ivan Sazima. His doctoral dissertation, titled História natural e ecologia de uma taxocenose de serpentes de mata na região de Manaus, focused on the natural history and ecology of forest snake assemblages in the Manaus region of central Amazonia.

During his postdoctoral training, he was a fellow at São Paulo State University in Rio Claro from 1995 to 1996. Since 2006, he has been a professor in the Department of Ecology at the Institute of Biosciences of São Paulo State University. In 2013, he conducted research at the University of Florida in Gainesville, Florida.

Martins’s research focuses on the processes underlying spatial and temporal patterns of diversity in amphibians and reptiles, as well as the factors contributing to their vulnerability and decline. He has published more than 100 scientific papers on the biology and conservation of amphibians and reptiles. In 2019, he co-authored the book Islands and Snakes: Isolation and Adaptive Evolution, and in 2021 he co-authored the field guide Guia da Herpetofauna da Estação Ecológica de Santa Bárbara.

Martins played an active role in the preparation of Brazil’s national Red Lists of threatened species, published in 2003 and 2014. His contributions included coordinating the assessment of Brazilian reptiles for the 2003 list and snakes for the 2014 list, organizing assessment workshops for amphibians and lizards as a coordinator for the IUCN Red List of Threatened Species, and participating in assessments of other animal groups for the 2014 list. From 2011 to 2019, he served as president of the Brazilian Society of Herpetology. He is editor-in-chief of the South American Journal of Herpetology.

== Taxa described ==
- Anomaloglossus stepheni Martins, 1989
- Bothrops alcatraz Marques, Martins & Sazima, 2002
- Bothrops otavioi Barbo, Grazziotin, Sazima, Martins & Sawaya, 2012
- Dendropsophus timbeba Martins & Cardoso, 1987
- Dendropsophus xapuriensis Martins & Cardoso, 1987
- Osteocephalus subtilis Martins & Cardoso, 1987
- Scinax peixotoi Brasileiro, Haddad, Sawaya & Martins, 2007
- Stenocercus canastra Ávila-Pires, Nogueira & Martins, 2019
