= Mouthier-Haute-Pierre =

- Commune
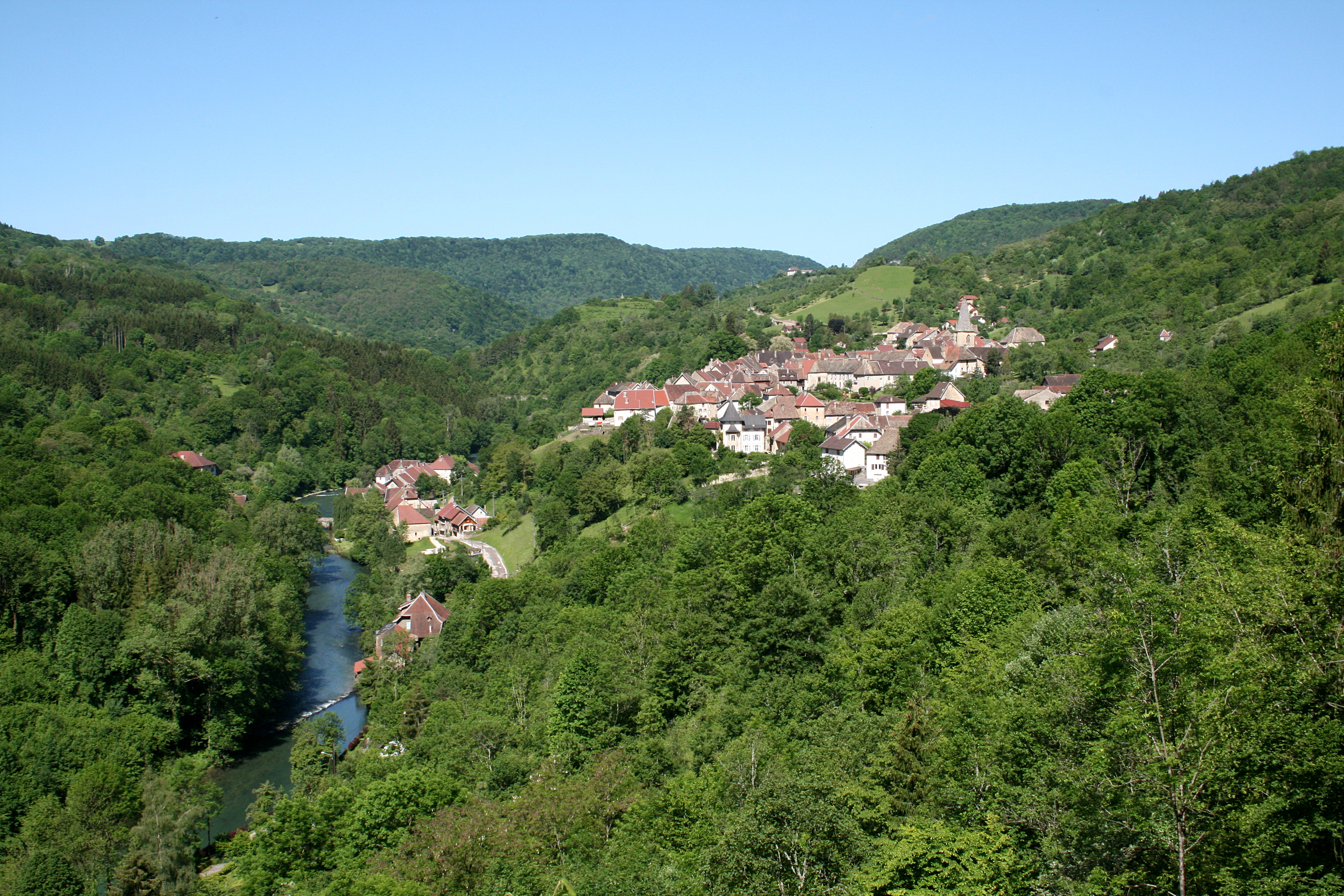
- A general view of Mouthier-Haute-Pierre

- Coat of arms
- Location of Mouthier-Haute-Pierre
- Location within France Location within Bourgogne-Franche-Comté
- Coordinates: 47°02′23″N 6°16′36″E
- Country: France
- Region: Bourgogne-Franche-Comté
- Department: Doubs
- Arrondissement: Besançon
- Canton: Ornans

Government
  - Mayor (2020–2026): Romuald Maugain
- Area^{1}: 12.13 km^{2} (4.68 sq mi)
- Highest elevation: 867 m (2,844 ft)
- Lowest elevation: 370 m (1,210 ft)
- Population (2023): 363
  - Density: 29.9/km^{2} (77.5/sq mi)
- Time zone: UTC+01:00 (CET)
  - Summer (DST): UTC+02:00 (CEST)
- INSEE/Postal code: 25415 /25920
- ^{1} French Land Register data, which excludes lakes, ponds, glaciers > 1 km^{2} (0.386 sq mi or 247 acres) and river estuaries.

Mouthier-Haute-Pierre (French pronunciation: [mutje ot pjɛʁ]) is a commune in the Doubs department in the Bourgogne-Franche-Comté region in eastern France.

The village is located in the upper Loue valley, just downstream of its source, in a particularly scenic landscape consisting of a natural amphitheatre dominated by steep cliffs. Other prominent features of the scenery are the 50-metre (160 ft) Syratu Falls, the Gorges de Nouailles, a canyon up to 350 meters deep, the Baume Archée and Faux-Monnayeurs caves and the source of Pontet.

The town grew up around a monastery of which it took its name, Monasterium of Alta Petra. Quoted from 870 in the division of Lothaire II, it was attached to the abbey of Cluny around 1120 with the rank of priory. It is probably during this time that the beginning of the winemaking activity marks the local identity. From the eighteenth century, many workshops and mills develop on the banks of the river and the town reach more than 1,000 inhabitants. Touched by the phylloxera crisis at the end of the nineteenth century, the vineyards were replaced by cherry trees intended to the production of a famous artisanal kirsch.

== Geography ==
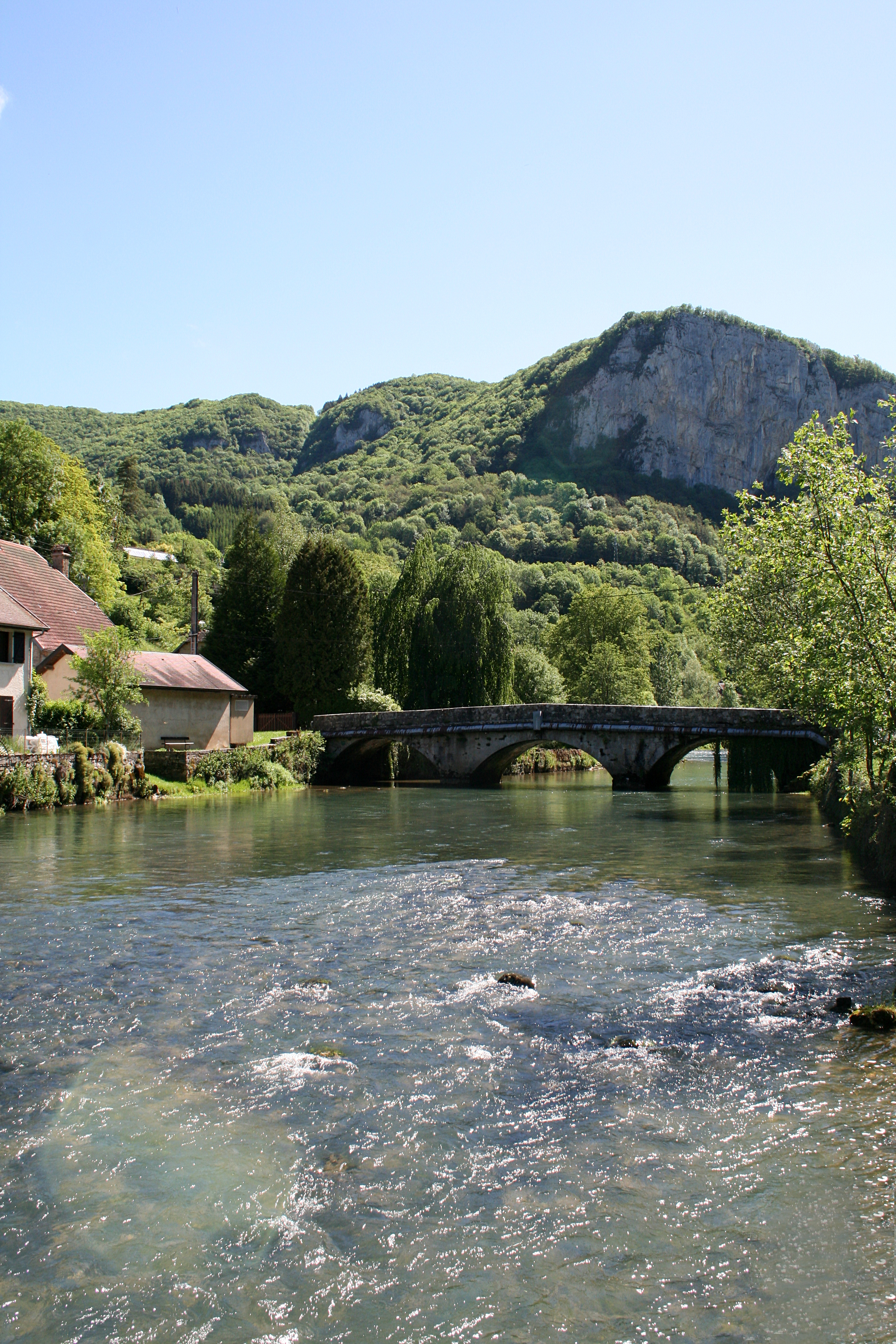
The bridge over the Loue and the neighborhood of the Rue du Pont

The commune lies 15 km (9.3 mi) southeast of Ornans.

== Population ==
Historical population
Year	Pop.	±% p.a.
1968	315	—
1975	338	+1.01%
1982	360	+0.90%
1990	356	−0.14%
1999	343	−0.41%
2007	314	−1.10%
2012	314	+0.00%
2017	335	+1.30%
2023	363	+1.35%
Source: INSEE

== See also ==
- Communes of the Doubs department
