= Howard Snell =

American ecologist and professor

Howard L. Snell
- Born: 1953 (age 72–73); La Mesa, California
- Occupation: ecologist

Howard L. Snell (born 1953) is an American ecologist and professor at the University of New Mexico. His research and conservation efforts have focused on the Galapagos land iguanas, which were in danger of extinction.

== Biography ==
Snell was born in 1953, in La Mesa, California. He received his BS in Zoology at San Diego State University in 1976. After graduating from San Diego State, he worked in the Galapagos Islands with the Peace Corps (1977 to 1979), and for the Charles Darwin Research Station and the Galapagos National Park from 1977-1980. Subsequently, he earned a Ph.D. in Zoology at Colorado State University, where he was mentored by C. R. Tracy (1979–1983). He was a post-doctoral associate at Texas Christian University working with Gary Ferguson (1984 to 1985). His first academic position was as an assistant professor at Memphis State University (1985 to 1986), after which he moved to the University of New Mexico (UNM). He is currently a full professor at UNM as well as the curator of amphibians and reptiles at the Museum of Southwestern Biology. Snell is also an active member of The Charles Darwin Foundation.

In 1975, he married Heidi Klienschmidt, an artist and photographer. She has a Bachelor of Fine Arts and is also an active member of The Charles Darwin Foundation.

== Research ==
Snell’s research broadly examines how human activity and exotic species affect native species. Most of his research has been on lizards, especially land iguanas, in the Galápagos Islands, comparing individual variation and differential phenotypic success to identify components of life history, morphology, and behavior susceptible to human activity. He has expanded this research to include archipelago-wide patterns of co-variation among populations and species. Specific projects include researching co-variation of life-history components among Galápagos organisms (primarily reptiles) and their susceptibility to extirpation and examining correlations between spatial patterns of extinction, distribution of organisms, and human activity.

Snell has also conducted extensive research on the efficiency of various restoration strategies for Galápagos vertebrates, and how to control, eradicate, and mitigate introduced species of vertebrates. He has also developed effective methods for ecological monitoring and improving responses by management agencies.

Snell has helped philanthropic organizations such as the World Wildlife Fund and government agencies including the Galápagos National Park Service and the Instituto Nacional de Galápagos to make informed decisions about conservation in the Galápagos. h;k][okl'm, /kp'[8

== Teaching and advising ==
Snell has been a major advisor for many graduate students. He has advised eleven doctoral students. His former students include Lee Fitzgerald, Professor of Zoology at Texas A&M University.

== Publications ==
Howard Snell's publications include:

- Snell, Howard; C. R. Tracy (1985). "Behavioral and Morphological Adaptations by Galapagos Land Iguanas". American Zoology. 1009.
- Snell, Howard; C. R. Tracy (1985). "Interrelations Among Water and Energy Relations of Reptilian Eggs, Embryos, and Hatchlings". American Zoology: 999–1008.
- Snell, Howard; P. A . Stone (1985). "A summary of geographical characteristics of the Galapagos Islands". Journal of Biogeography. 23 (5): 619–624. doi:10.1111/j.1365-2699.1996.tb00022.x.
- Snell, H.L. The realities and distribution of biological diversity in the Galápagos". Paper presented in the symposium "Ciencia y conservación en Galápagos," 21 July 1999, Quito.
- Snell, H.L. The realities and distribution of biological diversity in the Galápagos". Paper presented in the symposium "Galápagos: Ecology, Evolution, and Conservation in Darwin’s Islands," American Association for the Advancement of Science, Pacific Division, 80th Annual Meeting, 20–23 June 1999, San Francisco, California.
- Snell, H.L. and S. Rea. El Niño 1997–1998 en Galápagos". Poster presented in the symposium "Ciencia y conservación en Galápagos," 21 July 1999, Quito.

=== Books ===
Snell, H.M., H. L. Snell, G. Davis-Merlyn, T. Simkin, and R. Silbergleid. 1996. Bibliografía de Galápagos: 1535-1995. 300 pages. Fundación Charles Darwin, Quito, Ecuador.

Snell, H. L., H. M. Snell, P. A. Stone, M. Altamirano, A. Mauchamp, and I. Aldáz. 1995. La diversidad biológica de las islas Galápagos, volumen uno: análisis de la flora. 62 pages, Fundación Charles Darwin, Quito, Ecuador.
