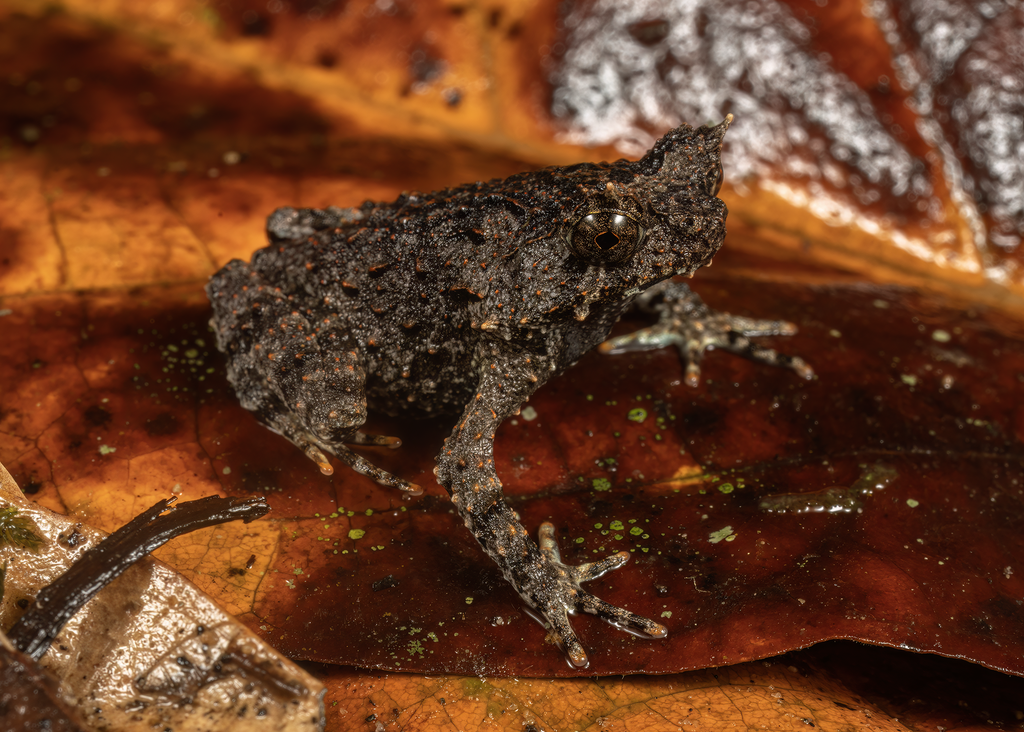

Conservation status
- Least Concern (IUCN 3.1)

Scientific classification
- Kingdom: Animalia
- Phylum: Chordata
- Class: Amphibia
- Order: Anura
- Family: Megophryidae
- Genus: Pelobatrachus
- Species: P. edwardinae

Binomial name
- Pelobatrachus edwardinae (Inger, 1989)

Synonyms
- Borneophrys edwardinae (Inger, 1989); Megophrys edwardinae Inger, 1989

= Pelobatrachus edwardinae =

Species of amphibian

Pelobatrachus edwardinae is a species of frog in the family Megophryidae. It is commonly known as the rough horned frog, Edwardina's horned frog, and Edwardina's spadefoot toad. It is endemic to northern Borneo and known from the Sabah and Sarawak provinces of Malaysia as well as from Brunei. Its natural habitats are tropical moist lowland forests and rivers. It is threatened by habitat loss

Formerly placed in the genus Megophrys, it was reclassified into the genus Pelobatrachus in 2021.
