= Sean McKeown =

American zoologist (1944–2002)

Sean McKeown (January 1, 1944 - July 11, 2002) was an American herpetologist, writer, and advocate for Hawaiian wildlife preservation. He was the former curator of reptiles at the Honolulu Zoo and published frequently on reptiles and amphibians.

== Biography ==
=== Early life ===
Sean McKeown was born January 1, 1944, in Los Angeles, California. As a child, he lived briefly in western Pennsylvania, then returned to California to attend elementary through high school. McKeown graduated from the University of California at Santa Barbara in 1967 with a bachelor's degree in political science. He attended California State University for graduate school, receiving his master's degree in biological sciences and anthropology in 1973.

=== Career ===
McKeown moved to Hawaii in 1975 and took a job at the Honolulu Zoo. He became supervising herpetologist at the zoo, where he expanded the zoo's reptile population and developed a number of breeding programs for some lizard and tortoise species.

In 1983, McKeown and his staff received the Edward Bean Award for conservation from the American Association of Zoological Parks and Aquariums, for breeding the endangered Madagascar ploughshare tortoise. Later that year, McKeown returned to California, where he became curator of reptiles for Fresno's Chaffee Zoological Gardens. He received another American Association of Zoological Parks and Aquariums award in 1986 for captive breeding of Madagascar ground boas.

McKeown did field work for the wildlife departments of Aruba, New Zealand, the Seychelles, Mauritius, Hawaii, and Guam. In the Seychelles, he oversaw the construction of an egg incubator for Aldabra giant tortoises, while in Aruba, he studied the Aruba Island rattlesnake. He was also an advocate for wildlife preservation in Hawaii, working with former Honolulu Zoo director Paul Breese to prevent the spread of brown tree snakes to the islands.

In 1990, McKeown became managing editor of The Vivarium magazine. He wrote more than 100 articles about breeding and caring for reptiles and amphibians.

=== Later life ===
McKeown was diagnosed with congestive heart failure in 1996 and received a heart transplant in April 2000 from Stanford Medical Center. On July 11, 2002, he died and was survived by his wife, Wendy, and children Dorie and Casey.

== Works ==
- A Field Guide to the Reptiles and Amphibians of the Hawaiian Islands, Diamond Head Publishing, Inc., Los Osos, California ISBN 0-9650731-0-6.
- The General Care and Maintenance of Day Geckos, Advanced Vivarium Systems, 1993, Lakeside CA.
- The General Care and Maintenance of Tokay Geckos and Related Species (1997)
