= Peter Brazaitis =

American herpetologist (1936- )

- Born: August 13, 1936 (age 89); Brooklyn, New York
- Occupation: Herpetologist

Peter Brazaitis (born August 13, 1936) is an American herpetologist and forensic specialist in herpetology and worked for the Wildlife Conservation Society (WCS, formerly the New York Zoological Society) from 1954 to 1998. He began as a reptile keeper at the Bronx Zoo, became Senior Keeper in 1967, Assistant Animal Manager in 1970, and Superintendent of Reptiles in 1972. In 1988, he transferred to the Central Park Wildlife Center as Assistant Curator of Animals and became Curator of Animals in 1990, a position he held until his retirement in 1998.

== Career ==
Brazaitis was born and raised in Brooklyn. His parents encouraged his interest in animals, and he developed a special interest in reptiles early in his life. At the age of 18, he began in the Reptile House at the Bronx Zoo, working under Curator James Oliver and later Curators Herndon G. Dowling, F. Wayne King, and John L. Behler. With New York Zoological Society (NYZS) support, Brazaitis earned his BS in forensic herpetology from Empire State College, SUNY, in 1983 and his MS in cellular biology from Long Island University in 1995.

Brazaitis has contributed to multiple projects on crocodilian biology and the conservation of commercially utilized reptiles. In 1967 he developed a methodology for sexing crocodilians, an essential technique for successful captive breeding of these animals. In 1968, he initiated the first captive breeding attempt for endangered Chinese alligators. Under the leadership of Behler, it later became the basis for the first AZA Species Survival Plan and a collaborative captive breeding program for the species at the Rockefeller Wildlife Refuge in Grand Chenier, Louisiana. During Brazaitis's tenure in the Bronx Zoo, the Reptile Department bred nine species of crocodilians, producing numerous founder stocks of endangered Cuban crocodiles, Siamese crocodiles, and the first Malayan false gharials to be captive bred in a US zoo.

Brazaitis was involved in field herpetological studies, including the NYZS Nixon Griffis expedition to Cameroon in 1981 to capture Goliath frogs. He also led expeditions to study crocodilian population biology on Palau and throughout South America.

Since the 1970s he has served as a forensic specialist and consultant to the US Fish & Wildlife Service (USFWS), and has received numerous awards for his service to the USFWS. He is internationally recognized as an expert in the identification of reptile and amphibian products used in illegal trades. Additionally, Brazaitis has held membership in the General Section of the American Academy of Forensic Sciences (1984-2012 [retired]).

He serves on the Association of Zoos and Aquariums' Crocodilian Advisory Group and is a member of the IUCN Crocodile Specialist Group. He was a research associate, Science Resource Center, WCS, from 1998 to 2005 and, since 2006, has been a curatorial affiliate, Department of Vertebrate Zoology, Yale Peabody Museum of Natural History.

He was profiled in the New York Times science section, December 23, 2003, and described as a storyteller with a “trove of absolutely wild animal stories.” His memoir, You Belong in a Zoo!, was cited by the American Library Association as one of the 10 best nonfiction adult books for young adults in 2003.

Brazaitis served in the US Army as a “tanker” in the 3rd Armored Division between 1955 and 1957.

He has two daughters by his first marriage, Bonnie Fina and Wendy Dean (deceased). He is married to alligator behaviorist and science writer Dr. Myrna E. Watanabe. They have one son, Peter J. Y. Brazaitis, a civil engineer.

== Selected bibliography ==
- Brazaitis, Peter. “Determination of sex in living crocodilians.” British Journal of Herpetology 4 (1969): 54–58.
- Brazaitis, Peter. “Identification of living crocodilians.” Zoologica 58 (1973): 59–101.
- Brazaitis, Peter. You Belong in a Zoo! Tales from a Lifetime Spent with Cobras, Crocs, and Other Creatures. New York: Villard, 2003. ISBN 978-1400060122.
- Brazaitis, Peter, and J. Abene. “History of crocodilian science at the Bronx Zoo, Wildlife Conservation Society.” Herpetological Review 39.2 (2008): 135–48.
- Brazaitis, Peter, and Myrna Watanabe. “Crocodilian behavior: A window to dinosaur behavior?” Historical Biology 23.1 (2011): 73–90.
- Brazaitis, Peter, and Myrna Watanabe. Fight for Survival: Animals in their Natural Habitats. New York: Friedman Group, 1994.
- Brazaitis, Peter, and Myrna Watanabe. Snakes of the World. New York: Crescent Books, 1992.
- Brazaitis, Peter, and G. Watkins-Colwell. “A brief history of crocodilian science.” Herpetological Review 42.4 (2011): 483–96.
- King, F. Wayne and Peter Brazaitis. “Identification of commercial crocodilian skins.” Zoologica 56 (1971): 15–70.
