= Charles Walker =

Charles or Charlie Walker may refer to:

== Politics ==
- Charles Arthur Walker (c. 1790–1873), member of the UK parliament for Wexford Borough
- Charles C. B. Walker (1824–1888), New York U.S. representative
- Charles E. Walker (1860–1893), New York State Senate politician
- Charles H. Walker (1828–1877), Wisconsin State Assembly
- Charles Rumford Walker (physician) (1852–1922), New Hampshire State Legislature
- Charles Walker (British politician) (born 1967), Conservative Party politician
- Charles Walker (Fijian politician) (1928–2021), Fijian civil servant, politician and diplomat
- Charles Walker (Georgia politician) (1947–2026), American politician
- Charls Walker (1923–2015), under secretary and deputy secretary of the US Treasury

== Religion ==
- Charles Coates Walker (1920–2004), American Quaker activist
- Charles Curwen Walker (1856–1940), Christadelphian writer and editor
- Charles L. Walker (1832–1904), Latter-day Saint hymn writer
- Charles Walker (liturgist) (died 1887), liturgist and author
- Charlie Cytron-Walker, American rabbi

== Sports ==
- Charles Walker (cricketer, born 1851) (1851–1941), English cricketer
- Charles Walker (long jumper) (born 1916), American long jumper, 1938 All-American for the Ohio State Buckeyes track and field team
- Charlie Walker (Australian cricketer) (Charles William Walker, 1909–1942), Australian wicket-keeper
- Charlie Walker (English cricketer) (born 1992), English cricketer, plays for Oxford MCCU and for Herefordshire
- Charlie Walker (footballer, born 1911) (1911–1990), English football player
- Charlie Walker (footballer, born 1990), English football player for Aldershot Town
- Charlie Walker (rugby union) (born 1992), English rugby player with Harlequin F.C.
- Chuck Walker (American football) (Charles David Walker, born 1941), American football player
- Chuck Walker (boxer) (born 1957), American boxer

== Other ==
- Charles D. Walker (born 1948), American astronaut
- Charles F. Walker, Latin American historian
- Charles Howard Walker (1857–1936), American architect
- Charles Beauchamp Walker (1817–1894), British Army general
- Charles Rumford Walker (1893–1974), American historian
- Charles Vincent Walker (1812–1882), British electrical engineer
- Charles Walker (checkers player) (1934–2024), Mississippi state checkers champion
- Charles Walker (engineer) (1877–1968), British engineer and aerodynamicist
- Charles Walker (murderer) (1940–1990), convicted murderer and first man to be executed in Illinois after capital punishment was reinstated
- Charlie Walker (musician) (1926–2008), American country musician
- Sir Roland Walker (Charles Roland Vincent Walker, born 1970), British Army general
