= Kraig Kerr Adler =

American herpetologist (born 1940)

- Born: December 6, 1940 (age 85); Lima, Ohio, U.S.
- Education: Ohio Wesleyan University; University of Michigan
- Known for: Research on amphibian behavior, taxonomy, and systematics Founder and first Secretary-General of the World Congress of Herpetology
- Awards: Founder’s Medal, Society for the History of Natural History (2018)
- Scientific career
- Fields: Herpetology
- Workplaces: Cornell University; University of Notre Dame
- Thesis: Environmental control of locomotor activity in a salamander (Plethodon glutinosus) (1968)
- Doctoral advisor: Charles F. Walker

Kraig Kerr Adler (born December 6, 1940) is an American herpetologist and academic. He is known for his work on amphibian behavior, evolution, and systematics, and for his leadership in international herpetological organizations.

== Early life and education ==
Adler is the son of William Charles and Jennie Belle Adler (née Noonan). He earned his Bachelor of Science from Ohio Wesleyan University in 1962 and his Master of Science from the University of Michigan in 1965. In 1968, he received his Ph.D. from the University of Michigan with the dissertation Environmental control of locomotor activity in a salamander (Plethodon glutinosus), under the supervision of Charles F. Walker. He married Dolores Rose Pochocki in 1967, and they have one son.

== Academic career ==
From 1968 to 1972, Adler was an assistant professor of biology at the University of Notre Dame in Indiana. In 1972, he joined the Department of Biology at Cornell University in Ithaca, New York, where he became associate professor and later full professor in 1980.

He chaired Cornell’s Department of Neurobiology and Behavior three times (1976–1979, 1991–1994, and 2008–2012) and served as the first associate administrative director of the Division of Biological Sciences from 1998 to 2005.

Adler has lectured at numerous universities and museums, including the Milwaukee Public Museum (1977), Miami University in Oxford, Ohio (1980), Rutgers University (1982), and the University of Michigan (1999).

== Professional contributions ==
In 1958, while still a student, Adler co-founded the Ohio Herpetological Society with fellow herpetologist David M. Dennis. This organization later evolved into the Society for the Study of Amphibians and Reptiles (SSAR) in 1967, now the world’s largest herpetological society with members in more than 60 countries. In 1982, during the SSAR’s 25th meeting, the World Congress of Herpetology (WCH) was established, and Adler was elected its first Secretary-General, a position he held until 1989.

Adler has published over 150 scientific papers and numerous books, including the Encyclopedia of Reptiles and Amphibians (with Tim Halliday) and Herpetology of China (with Zhao Ermi). His work has described fundamental aspects of amphibian behavior such as the use of magnetic, extraocular, and polarized light perception for navigation and kin recognition among tadpoles.

He has also written extensively on zooarchaeology, especially turtle remains, and on amphibian systematics. Adler initiated comparative studies on electrical orientation in salamanders and has researched the evolution and systematics of amphibians and reptiles, focusing on the herpetofauna of China and Central America. He edited the three-volume series Contributions to the History of Herpetology (1989, 2007, 2012), an encyclopedic work on the biographies of deceased herpetologists and an index of living ones. As editor of the SSAR’s Contributions to Herpetology series, Adler oversaw publication of the final four volumes of Carl Gans’s Biology of the Reptilia.

== Taxa described ==
Adler has described numerous species of frogs, newts, and salamanders from genera including Liurana, Limnonectes, Nanorana, Quasipaa, Ingerana, Charadrahyla, Sarcohyla, Leptobrachella, Leptobrachium, Amolops, Odorrana, Rana, Theloderma, Hynobius, Pseudoeurycea, Plethodon, and Tylotriton.

== Memberships ==
Adler served as president of the Society for the Study of Amphibians and Reptiles in 1982. He is a member of the American Association for the Advancement of Science, the American Society of Ichthyologists and Herpetologists, the Society for the Study of Evolution, the Animal Behavior Society, and Sigma Xi.

== Eponyms and honors ==
Several species have been named in Adler’s honor, including:

- Cyrtodactylus adleri (Das, 1997)
- Gekko adleri (Nguyen, Wang, Yang, Lehmann, Le, Ziegler & Bonkowski, 2013)
- Myriopholis adleri (Hahn & Wallach, 1998)
- Rhabdophis adleri (Zhao, 1997)
- Sceloporus adleri (Smith & Savitzky, 1974)

In 2018, Adler received the Founder’s Medal from the Society for the History of Natural History for his contributions to the field.

== Selected publications ==
- Encyclopedia of Reptiles and Amphibians (with Tim Halliday)
- Herpetology of China (with Zhao Ermi)
- Contributions to the History of Herpetology (ed., vols. 1–3)
