= ABS-CBN Philharmonic Orchestra =

Filipino radio orchestra

- Radio orchestra
- Founded: July 20, 2012; 14 years ago
- Location: Manila, Philippines
- Music director: Gerard Salonga
- Website: philharmonic.abs-cbn.com

The ABS-CBN Philharmonic Orchestra is a Filipino radio orchestra based in Manila. It was founded in 2012 with financial support from ABS-CBN Corporation and First Philippine Holdings Corporation. It is composed of 40 instrumentalists. The orchestra's musical director and conductors are Thanapol Setabrahmana and Gerard Salonga.

== History ==
The official debut of ABS-CBN Philharmonic Orchestra was on July 20, 2012, in a concert held at the Dolphy theater. The orchestra played some classical pieces and some musical scores of Filipino films. Its first major public debut was on the "Icons at the Arena" concert at the SM Mall of Asia Arena on July 16, 2012. The orchestra played some of the most recognized film scores of the American composer John Williams in its first solo concert, "The Magic of John Williams" on September 2, 2012, at the Meralco Theater. In 2013, due to public demand, the orchestra repeated their concert "The Magic of John Williams" on February 23, held also at the Meralco Theatre. The orchestra has played alongside Andrea Bocelli, Idina Menzel, Lea Salonga, Lisa Macuja, Ballet Philippines, Ballet Manila, Joanna Ampil, Jose Mari Chan, Ogie Alcasid, Martin Nievera, Pilita Corrales, Louie Ocampo, Ryan Cayabyab, Basil Valdez, Rey Valera, Christian Bautista, Janella Salvador, Jona, and Xian Lim among many others. In 2019, the orchestra performed its last performance before the hiatus, in the Hyundai Hall of the Ateneo de Manila University.

After a 5-year hiatus, the orchestra was restarted in 2024, with most of its former members and conductors.

== Film scores ==
ABS-CBN Philharmonic Orchestra has scored several films, including Debosyon (2013), Ignacio de Loyola (2016), and Ang Larawan (2017). The orchestra also provided the musical score for the Agila: The EKsperience attraction of Enchanted Kingdom.
