= Stegonotus (snake) =

Scientific classification
- Kingdom: Animalia
- Phylum: Chordata
- Class: Reptilia
- Order: Squamata
- Suborder: Serpentes
- Family: Colubridae
- Subfamily: Colubrinae
- Genus: Stegonotus; A.M.C. Duméril, Bibron & A.H.A. Duméril, 1854

Genus of snakes

Stegonotus is a genus of snakes in the family Colubridae. Species of the genus Stegonotus are native to Australia, Indonesia, and New Guinea.

== Species ==
The genus Stegonotus contains 24 species which are recognized as being valid.

- Stegonotus admiraltiensis Ruane, Richards, McVay, Tjaturadi, Krey & Austin, 2017 – Admiralty Islands ground snake
- Stegonotus aplini O'Shea & Richards, 2021 – Purari White ground snake
- Stegonotus aruensis (Doria, 1875) – Aru Islands ground snake
- Stegonotus australis (Günther, 1872) – Australian ground snake
- Stegonotus ayamaru C. Kaiser, O'Shea & H. Kaiser, 2019 – Ayamaru ground snake
- Stegonotus batjanensis (Günther, 1865) – Bacan Island groundsnake, Batjan frog-eating snake
- Stegonotus borneensis Inger, 1967 – Borneo ground snake, Borneo frog-eating snake
- Stegonotus caligocephalus C. Kaiser, Lapin, O’Shea & H. Kaiser, 2020 – Dark-headed Sabah ground snake
- Stegonotus cucullatus (A.M.C. Duméril, Bibron & A.H.A. Duméril, 1854) – Bird's Head Peninsula ground snake, slatey-grey snake
- Stegonotus derooijae Ruane, Richards, McVay, Tjaturadi, Krey & Austin 2017 – De Rooij's ground snake, Raja Ampat ground snake
- Stegonotus diehli Lindholm, 1905 – Diehl's little ground snake
- Stegonotus florensis (de Rooij, 1917) – Flores ground snake
- Stegonotus guentheri Boulenger, 1895 – D'Entrecasteaux Archipelago ground snake, Milne Bay ground snake
- Stegonotus heterurus Boulenger, 1893 – Bismarck ground snake
- Stegonotus iridis Ruane, Richards, McVay, Tjaturadi, Krey & Austin 2017 – Iridescent ground snake, Rainbow ground ₪snake
- Stegonotus keyensis (Doria, 1874) – Kei Islands ground snake
- Stegonotus lividus A.M.C. Duméril, Bibron & A.H.A. Duméril, 1854 – Semau Island ground snake
- Stegonotus melanolabiatus Ruane, Richards, McVay, Tjaturadi, Krey & Austin 2017 – Black-lipped ground snake
- Stegonotus modestus (Schlegel, 1837) – Moluccan ground snake, Maluku ground snake, northern frog-eating snake
- Stegonotus muelleri A.M.C. Duméril, Bibron & A.H.A. Duméril, 1854 – Philippine ground snake
- Stegonotus nancuro H. Kaiser, C. Kaiser, Mecke & O’Shea, 2021 – Timor ground snake
- Stegonotus parvus (A.B. Meyer, 1874) – Biak Island ground snake, common ground snake
- Stegonotus poechi F. Werner, 1924 – Pöch's ground snake
- Stegonotus reticulatus Boulenger, 1895 – Reticulated ground snake
- Stegonotus sutteri Forcart, 1953 – Sumba ground snake

Nota bene: A binomial authority in parentheses indicates that the species was originally described in a genus other than Stegonotus.

== Etymology ==
The specific name, aplini, is in honor of Australian herpetologist and mammalogist Kenneth Peter "Ken" Aplin.

The specific name, derooijae, is in honor of Dutch herpetologist Nelly de Rooij.

The specific name, diehli, is in honor of German missionary Wilhelm Diehl (1874–1940), who collected herpetological specimens in New Guinea.

The specific name, guentheri, is in honor of German-born British herpetologist Albert Günther.

The specific name, muelleri, is in honor of German herpetologist Johannes Peter Müller.

The specific name, poechi, is in honor of Austrian ethnologist & anthropologist Rudolf Pöch.

The specific name, sutteri, is in honor of Swiss ornithologist Ernst Sutter.
