= Chuck Walker =

Chuck Walker may refer to:

- Chuck Walker (American football) (born 1941), American football defensive tackle
- Chuck Walker (boxer) (born 1957), American boxer
- Chuck Walker (racing driver) (born 1963), American stock car racing driver
- Charles F. Walker, professor of Latin American history

== See also ==
- Charles Walker (disambiguation)
