= Charles William Walker =

Charles William Walker may refer to:

- Charles Walker (cricketer, born 1851) (1851–1915), English cricketer
- Charlie Walker (Australian cricketer) (1909–1942), Australian wicket-keeper

== See also ==
- Charles Walker (disambiguation)
