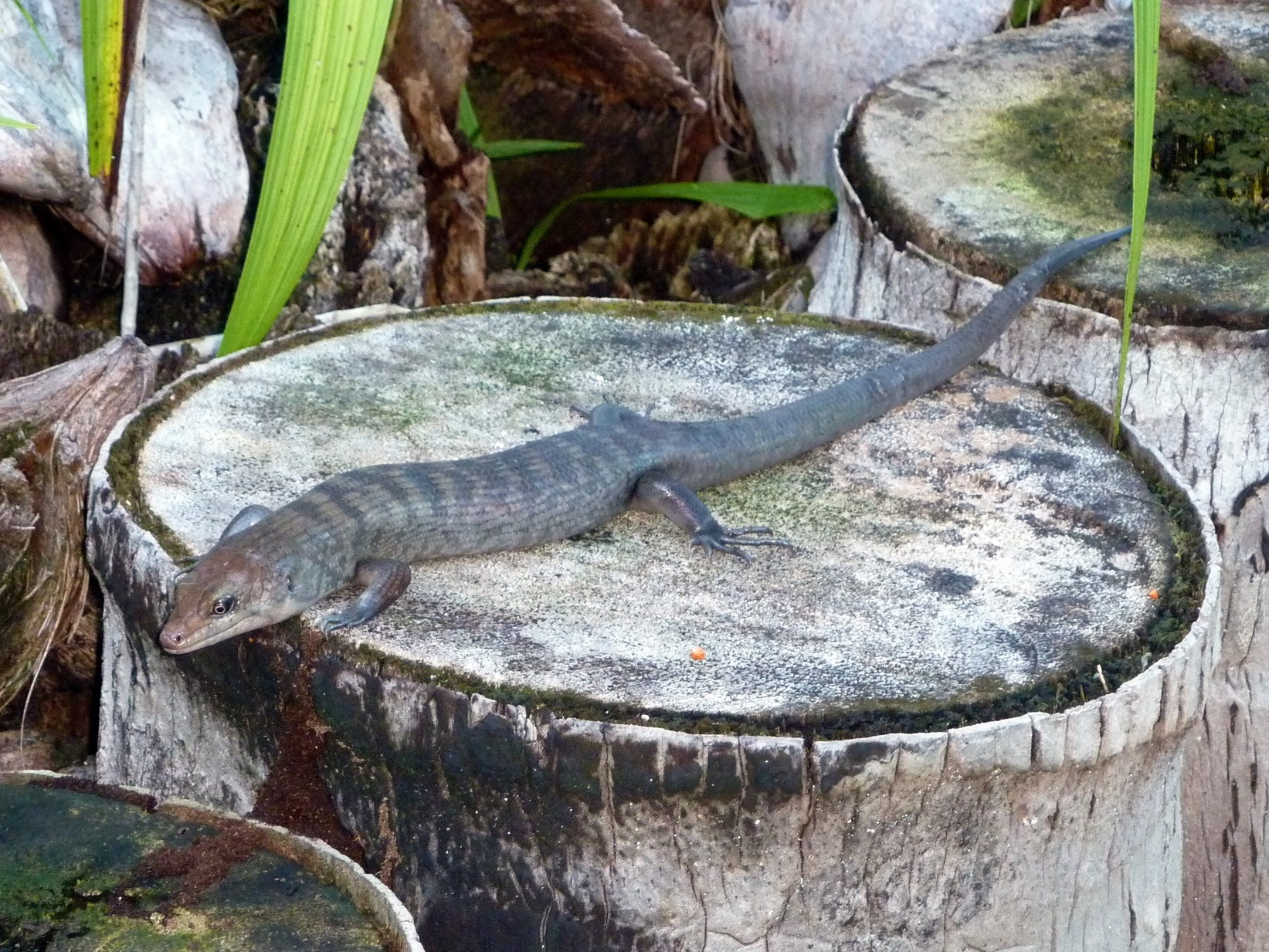
- Eugongylus albofasciolatus

Scientific classification
- Domain: Eukaryota
- Kingdom: Animalia
- Phylum: Chordata
- Class: Reptilia
- Order: Squamata
- Family: Scincidae
- Subfamily: Eugongylinae
- Genus: Eugongylus; Fitzinger, 1843

Species
- Five, see text

= Eugongylus =

Mastiff skinks or short-legged giant skinks

Genus of lizards

Eugongylus is a genus of skinks in the subfamily Eugongylinae. It was previously recognised as namesake of the Eugonglyus group of genera within Lygosominae, where it occupied a quite basal position. Members of this genus are commonly called mastiff skinks or short-legged giant skinks.

== Species ==
The following species are recognized as being valid.

- Eugongylus albofasciolatus (Günther, 1872) – white-banded mastiff skink, white-banded giant skink, white-striped cape skink, barred shark skink
- Eugongylus mentovarius (Boettger, 1895) – odd-chinned mastiff skink, odd-chinned giant skink
- Eugongylus rufescens (Shaw, 1802) – bar-lipped sheen-skink
- Eugongylus sulaensis (Kopstein, 1927) – Sula skink
- Eugongylus unilineatus (de Rooij, 1915)

Notabene: A binomial authority in parentheses indicates that the species was originally described in a genus other than Eugongylus.
