= C. malayanus =

C. malayanus may refer to:

- Carrhotus malayanus, a spider species
- Cyrtodactylus malayanus, a gecko species

== See also ==
- Malayanus
