= Stegonotus caligocephalus =

Scientific classification
- Kingdom: Animalia
- Phylum: Chordata
- Class: Reptilia
- Order: Squamata
- Suborder: Serpentes
- Family: Colubridae
- Genus: Stegonotus
- Species: S. caligocephalus

Binomial name
- Stegonotus caligocephalus C. Kaiser, Lapin, O'Shea, & H. Kaiser, 2020

Species of snake

Stegonotus caligocephalus, the dark-headed Sabah ground snake, is a species of snake of the family Colubridae.

The snake is found in Malaysia.
