= Stegonotus nancuro =

Scientific classification
- Kingdom: Animalia
- Phylum: Chordata
- Class: Reptilia
- Order: Squamata
- Suborder: Serpentes
- Family: Colubridae
- Genus: Stegonotus
- Species: S. nancuro

Binomial name
- Stegonotus nancuro H. Kaiser, C. Kaiser, Mecke, & O'Shea, 2021

Species of snake

Stegonotus nancuro is a species of snake of the family Colubridae. The snake is known to live in the Manatuto Municipality of Timor-Leste
