= Iridescent ground snake =

There are two species of snake named iridescent ground snake:

- Atractus iridescens
- Stegonotus iridis
