= Stegonotus ayamaru =

Scientific classification
- Kingdom: Animalia
- Phylum: Chordata
- Class: Reptilia
- Order: Squamata
- Suborder: Serpentes
- Family: Colubridae
- Genus: Stegonotus
- Species: S. ayamaru

Binomial name
- Stegonotus ayamaru C. Kaiser, O'Shea, & H. Kaiser, 2019

Species of snake

Stegonotus ayamaru, the Ayamaru ground snake, is a species of snake of the family Colubridae.

The snake is found in Indonesia.
