= Stegonotus aplini =

Scientific classification
- Kingdom: Animalia
- Phylum: Chordata
- Class: Reptilia
- Order: Squamata
- Suborder: Serpentes
- Family: Colubridae
- Genus: Stegonotus
- Species: S. aplini

Binomial name
- Stegonotus aplini O'Shea & Richards, 2021

Species of snake

Stegonotus aplini is a species of snake of the family Colubridae.

The snake is found in Papua New Guinea.
