= Reticulate ground snake =

There are two species of snake named reticulate ground snake:

- Atractus reticulatus
- Stegonotus reticulatus
