= Stegonotus modestus =

Conservation status
- Least Concern (IUCN 3.1)

Scientific classification
- Kingdom: Animalia
- Phylum: Chordata
- Class: Reptilia
- Order: Squamata
- Suborder: Serpentes
- Family: Colubridae
- Genus: Stegonotus
- Species: S. modestus

Binomial name
- Stegonotus modestus (Schlegel, 1837)

Species of snake

Stegonotus modestus, the Moluccan ground snake, Maluku ground snake, or northern frog-eating snake, is a species of snake of the family Colubridae.

The snake is found in Indonesia.
