= Sceloporus adleri =

Conservation status
- Least Concern (IUCN 3.1)

Scientific classification
- Kingdom: Animalia
- Phylum: Chordata
- Class: Reptilia
- Order: Squamata
- Suborder: Iguania
- Family: Phrynosomatidae
- Genus: Sceloporus
- Species: S. adleri

Binomial name
- Sceloporus adleri H.M. Smith & Savitzky, 1974

Species of lizard

Sceloporus adleri, also known commonly as Adler's spiny lizard and el chintete rayado in Mexican Spanish, is a species of lizard in the family Phrynosomatidae. The species is endemic to Mexico.

== Etymology ==
The specific name, adleri, is in honor of American herpetologist Kraig Kerr Adler.

== Geographic range ==
S. adleri is found in the Mexican state of Guerrero.

== Habitat ==
The preferred natural habitat of S. adleri is limestone outcrops in forest, but it has also been found on rocks in traditional maize fields.

== Reproduction ==
S. adleri is viviparous.

== Taxonomy ==
S. adleri is a member of the S. formosus species group.
