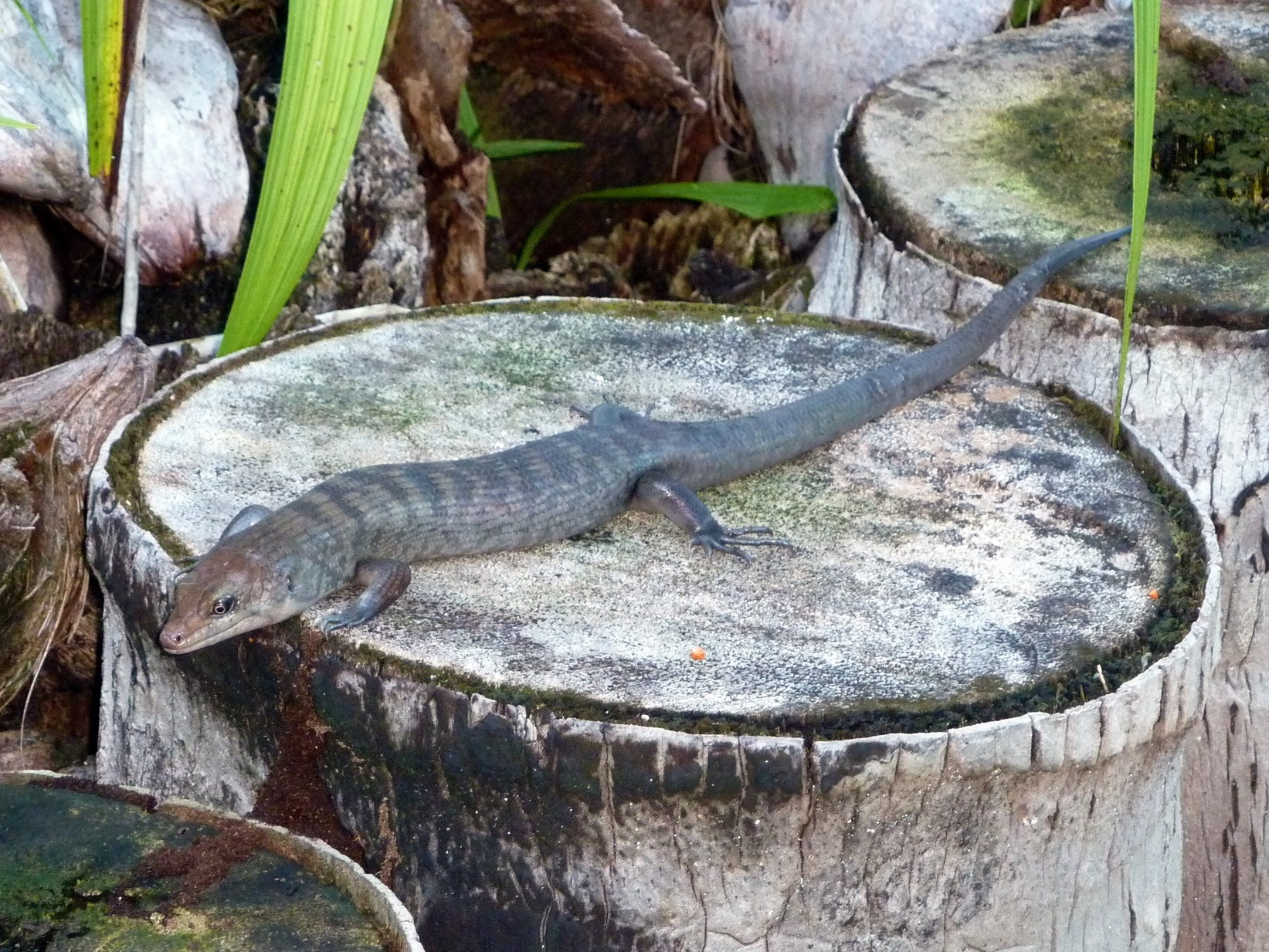

Conservation status
- Least Concern (IUCN 3.1)

Scientific classification
- Kingdom: Animalia
- Phylum: Chordata
- Class: Reptilia
- Order: Squamata
- Suborder: Scinciformata
- Infraorder: Scincomorpha
- Family: Eugongylidae
- Genus: Eugongylus
- Species: E. albofasciolatus

Binomial name
- Eugongylus albofasciolatus (Günther, 1872)

= Eugongylus albofasciolatus =

Species of lizard

Eugongylus albofasciolatus, the white-striped cape skink or barred shark skink, is a species of lizard in the family Scincidae. It is found in Australia (Queensland), the Solomon Islands, New Britain, New Ireland, and Micronesia.
