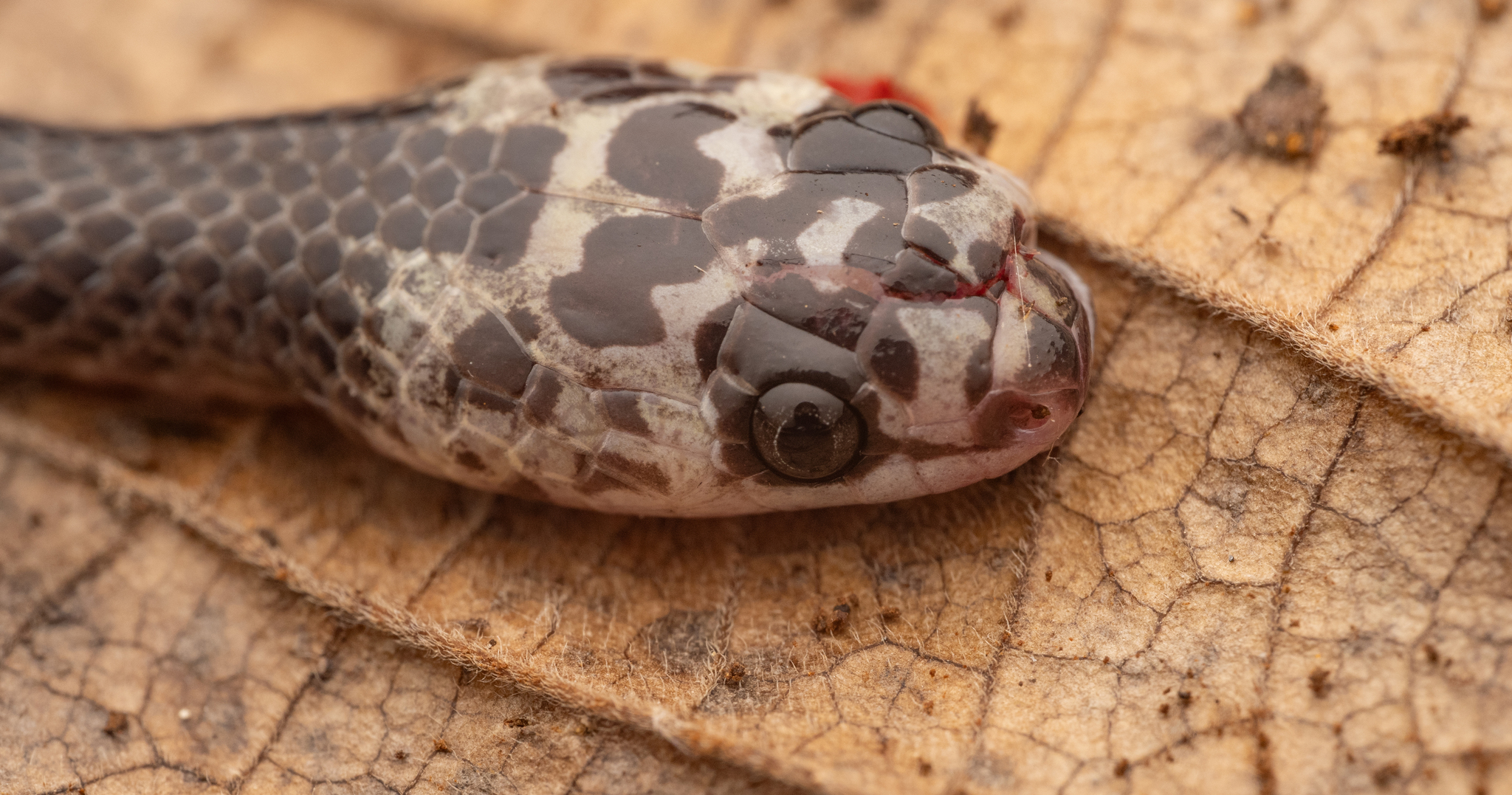

Conservation status
- Least Concern (IUCN 3.1)

Scientific classification
- Kingdom: Animalia
- Phylum: Chordata
- Class: Reptilia
- Order: Squamata
- Suborder: Serpentes
- Family: Colubridae
- Genus: Stegonotus
- Species: S. diehli

Binomial name
- Stegonotus diehli Lindholm, 1905

= Stegonotus diehli =

Species of snake

Stegonotus diehli, Diehl's little ground snake, is a species of snake of the family Colubridae.

The snake is found in Papua New Guinea.
