= Eugongylus sulaensis =

Scientific classification
- Kingdom: Animalia
- Phylum: Chordata
- Class: Reptilia
- Order: Squamata
- Family: Scincidae
- Genus: Eugongylus
- Species: E. sulaensis

Binomial name
- Eugongylus sulaensis (Kopstein, 1927)

Species of lizard

Eugongylus sulaensis, the Sula skink, is a species of lizard in the family Scincidae. It is found in Indonesia.
