= Space Shuttle (roller coaster) =

Roller coaster at Enchanted Kingdom, Santa Rosa, Laguna, Philippines

- Previously known as Cobra at West Midland Safari and Leisure Park (1985-1991)

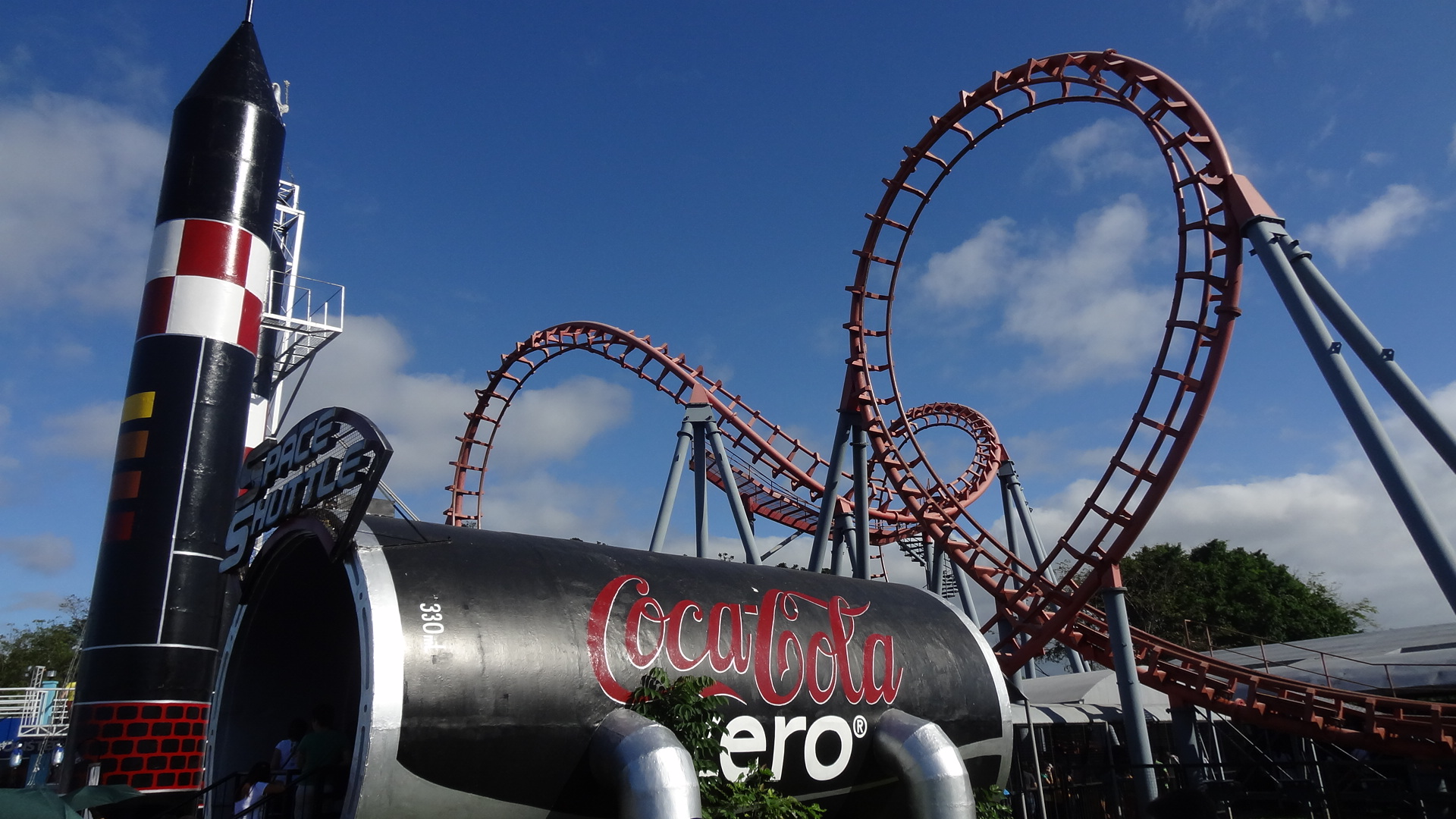
- Space Shuttle in 2015

Enchanted Kingdom
- Location: Enchanted Kingdom
- Park section: Spaceport
- Coordinates: 14.281947°N 121.095394°E
- Status: Operating
- Opening date: October 19, 1995

General statistics
- Type: Steel – Shuttle – Boomerang
- Manufacturer: Vekoma
- Model: Boomerang
- Lift/launch system: Chain lift hill
- Height: 116.6 ft (35.5 m)
- Length: 935 ft (285 m)
- Speed: 47 mph (76 km/h)
- Inversions: 3
- Duration: 1:48
- Capacity: 760 riders per hour
- G-force: 5.2
- Space Shuttle at RCDB

The Space Shuttle is a steel roller coaster situated at Enchanted Kingdom in Santa Rosa, Laguna in the Philippines. It is a Vekoma Boomerang coaster. It has a single train with seven cars, with 2 rows per car and 2 seats per row. The train is capable of carrying a maximum of 28 passengers. It is inspired by sci-fi films and the NASA space program of the 1960s. This 11-story roller coaster inverts riders six times - three times forward and three times backward. This is the first coaster ride of its kind in the country. This ride was originally called the 'Cobra' and it was located at West Midland Safari and Leisure Park in Bewdley, England from 1985 to 1991.

== Ride elements ==
- Lift hill
- Cobra roll
- Loop

== Ride layout ==
The ride begins when the train is pulled backwards from the station and up a 116.5-foot (35.5 m) lift spike, before being released. After being released, the train passes through the station, enters a Cobra roll element (referred to as a boomerang by the designers), then travels through a vertical loop. Upon exiting the loop, the train runs up a second spike, which is angled so that the two spikes meet at the top in a "V"-like formation. Once the train runs out of momentum, it is lifted to the top of the second spike via chain lift, and is held for several seconds before being released; travelling through the layout in reverse before returning being finally coming to a complete stop in the station.

== Incidents ==
In December 2007, Space Shuttle had an incident when the train stalled on the Cobra Roll element of the ride. There were 25 riders during the incident which were mostly students on an educational tour. There were no serious injuries among the students. After that, Space Shuttle was temporarily suspended for technical renovation. Since then, the ride re-opened to the public and was renamed as Space Shuttle Max sponsored by Pepsi-Cola Philippines. The park would later seal a partnership with Coca-Cola in 2012, apparently replacing the Pepsi-Cola sponsorship on the ride.
