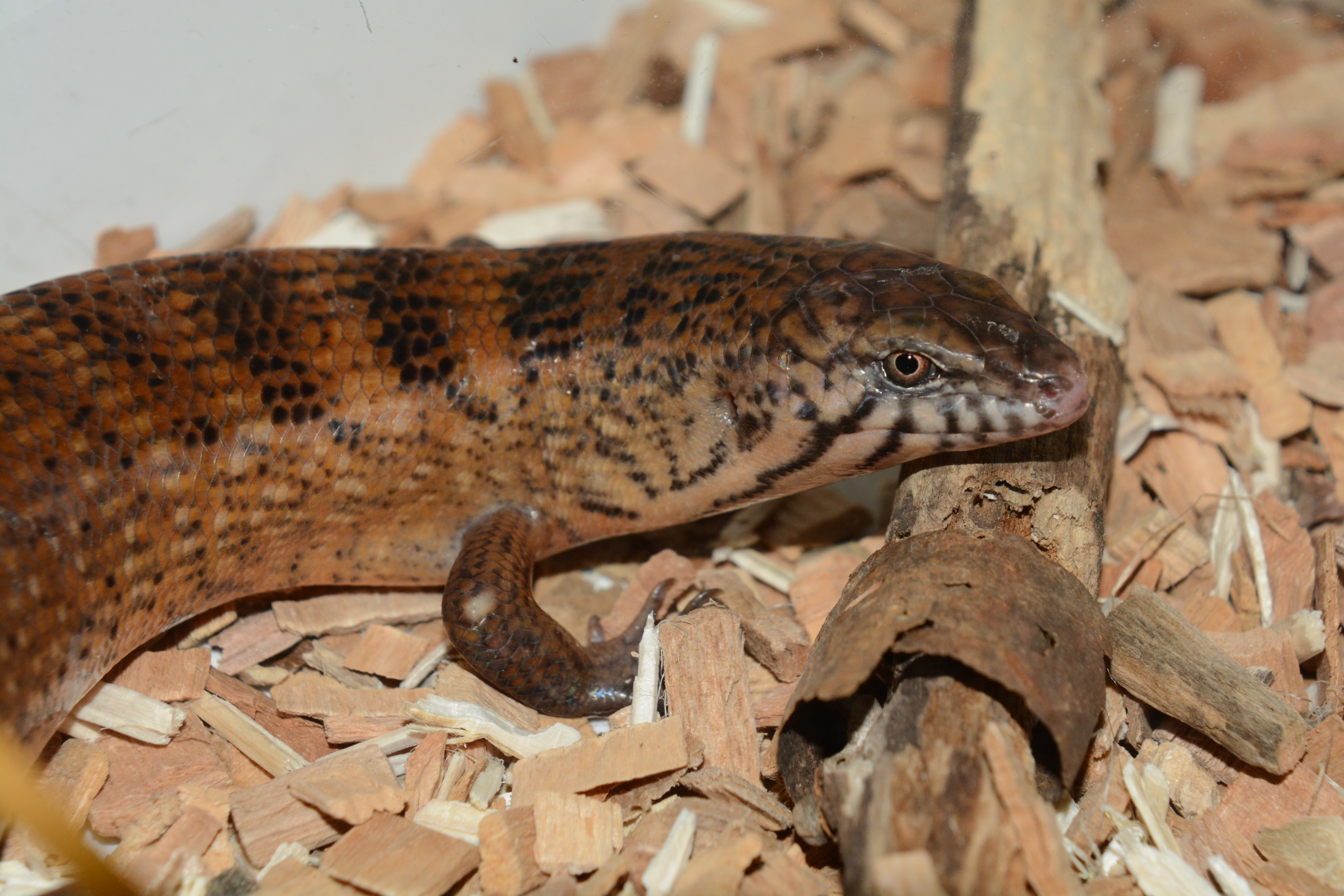

Scientific classification
- Kingdom: Animalia
- Phylum: Chordata
- Class: Reptilia
- Order: Squamata
- Family: Scincidae
- Genus: Eugongylus
- Species: E. mentovarius

Binomial name
- Eugongylus mentovarius (Boettger, 1895)

= Eugongylus mentovarius =

Species of lizard

Eugongylus mentovarius is a species of lizard in the family Scincidae. It is found in Indonesia.
