= Stegonotus derooijae =

Conservation status
- Data Deficient (IUCN 3.1)

Scientific classification
- Kingdom: Animalia
- Phylum: Chordata
- Class: Reptilia
- Order: Squamata
- Suborder: Serpentes
- Family: Colubridae
- Genus: Stegonotus
- Species: S. derooijae

Binomial name
- Stegonotus derooijae Ruane, Richards, McVay, Tjaturadi, Krey, & Austin, 2017

Species of snake

Stegonotus derooijae, De Rooij's ground snake, is a species of snake of the family Colubridae.

The snake is found in Indonesia.
