= Ashley Walker (cricketer) =

English cricketer

Ashley Walker (22 June 1844 – 26 May 1927) was an English amateur cricketer, who played nine games for Yorkshire County Cricket Club from 1863 to 1870, ten for Cambridge University from 1864 to 1866, and one match for the North of England in 1870. He also represented South Wales Cricket Club from 1875 to 1876. His cousin, Charles Walker, played one match for the Gentlemen of the North.

Born in Bowling Hall, Bradford, Yorkshire, England, Walker was educated at Westminster School and later attended Trinity College (1862–3) and Magdalene College, Cambridge (1863–6). He earned a cricket blue from 1864 to 1866. As a right-handed batsman, Walker scored 531 runs at 15.61, with a top score of 65 against the Marylebone Cricket Club (MCC). As a bowler, he took eighteen wickets with his right-arm slow roundarm deliveries at an average of 16.05, with his best analysis being 6 for 89 against Surrey.

Walker also played for Staffordshire. He moved to Swansea in 1875 before joining the public education department in Ceylon, where he served from 1876 to 1901. He held the role of Principal Inspector of Schools in Ceylon from 1890 to 1894, as well as in 1895 and 1901. Walker actively played, notably at Royal College Colombo and captained teams to Madras and Bombay 1885 and 1886. He also played for the Yorkshire Gentlemen team in its early days.

He married Rachel Strick of Swansea on 28 September 1876. Walker died in May 1927 in Harrold, Bedfordshire, England and was survived by family and friends.
