= Charles Rumford Walker =

American novelist

Charles Rumford Walker Jr. (July 31, 1894 – November 26, 1974) was an American historian, political scientist, and novelist. He specialized in the study of the history of the industrial worker.

== Biography ==
Walker was born in Concord, New Hampshire. He was the son of Francis Sheafe and Charles Rumford Walker, a physician and politician. He graduated from Yale University in 1916 and served in the United States Army during World War I.

He was associate editor of Atlantic Monthly from 1922 to 1923, The Independent from 1924 to 1925, and The Bookman from 1928 to 1929. One of his most successful books was American City: A Rank and File View (1937). He also wrote Steel: The Diary of a Furnace Worker and Bread and Fire: A Novel.

He died on November 26, 1974.
