= Eugongylus unilineatus =

Conservation status
- Least Concern (IUCN 3.1)

Scientific classification
- Kingdom: Animalia
- Phylum: Chordata
- Class: Reptilia
- Order: Squamata
- Family: Scincidae
- Genus: Eugongylus
- Species: E. unilineatus

Binomial name
- Eugongylus unilineatus (de Rooij, 1915)

Species of lizard

Eugongylus unilineatus is a species of lizard in the family Scincidae. It is found in Papua New Guinea.
