= Stegonotus keyensis =

Conservation status
- Least Concern (IUCN 3.1)

Scientific classification
- Kingdom: Animalia
- Phylum: Chordata
- Class: Reptilia
- Order: Squamata
- Suborder: Serpentes
- Family: Colubridae
- Genus: Stegonotus
- Species: S. keyensis

Binomial name
- Stegonotus keyensis (Doria, 1874)

Species of snake

Stegonotus keyensis, the Kei Islands ground snake, is a species of snake of the family Colubridae.

The snake is found on the Kai Islands in Indonesia.
