= Oligodon petronellae =

Conservation status
- Data Deficient (IUCN 3.1)

Scientific classification
- Kingdom: Animalia
- Phylum: Chordata
- Class: Reptilia
- Order: Squamata
- Suborder: Serpentes
- Family: Colubridae
- Genus: Oligodon
- Species: O. petronellae

Binomial name
- Oligodon petronellae Roux, 1917

Synonyms
- Oligodon ornatus Roux, 1914 (nomen praeocupandum); Oligodon petronellae Roux in de Rooij, 1917 (nomen novum); Oligodon annulifer var. confluens F. Werner, 1924; Simotes annulifer var. confluens (F. Werner, 1924)

Species of snake

Oligodon petronellae, also known commonly as Petronella's kukri snake, is a species of snake in the subfamily Colubrinae of the family Colubridae. The species is endemic to the island of Sumatra in Indonesia.

== Etymology ==
The specific name, petronellae, is in honor of Dutch herpetologist Petronella Johanna "Nelly" de Rooij (1883–1964).

== Geographic distribution ==
On Sumatra, Oligodon petronellae is found in the vicinity of Padang, in the province of West Sumatra.

== Behavior ==
Oligodon petronellae is terrestrial.

== Diet ==
Like other members of its genus, Oligodon petronellae eats mainly reptile eggs, but also preys upon small lizards.

== Reproduction ==
Oligodon petronellae is oviparous.
