= Stegonotus melanolabiatus =

Scientific classification
- Kingdom: Animalia
- Phylum: Chordata
- Class: Reptilia
- Order: Squamata
- Suborder: Serpentes
- Family: Colubridae
- Genus: Stegonotus
- Species: S. melanolabiatus

Binomial name
- Stegonotus melanolabiatus Ruane, Richards, McVay, Tjaturadi, Krey, & Austin, 2017

Species of snake

Stegonotus melanolabiatus, the black-lipped ground snake, is a species of snake of the family Colubridae.

The snake is found in Papua New Guinea.
