= Stegonotus muelleri =

Conservation status
- Least Concern (IUCN 3.1)

Scientific classification
- Kingdom: Animalia
- Phylum: Chordata
- Class: Reptilia
- Order: Squamata
- Suborder: Serpentes
- Family: Colubridae
- Genus: Stegonotus
- Species: S. muelleri

Binomial name
- Stegonotus muelleri A.M.C. Duméril, Bibron & A.H.A. Duméril, 1854

Species of snake

Stegonotus muelleri, the Philippine ground snake, Müller's rat snake, or Muller's wolf snake, is a species of snake of the family Colubridae. It was first described by Duméril, Bibron and Duméril in 1854.

The snake is found in the Philippines.
