= Upham-Walker House =

Historic house in Concord, New Hampshire, United States

- U.S. National Register of Historic Places
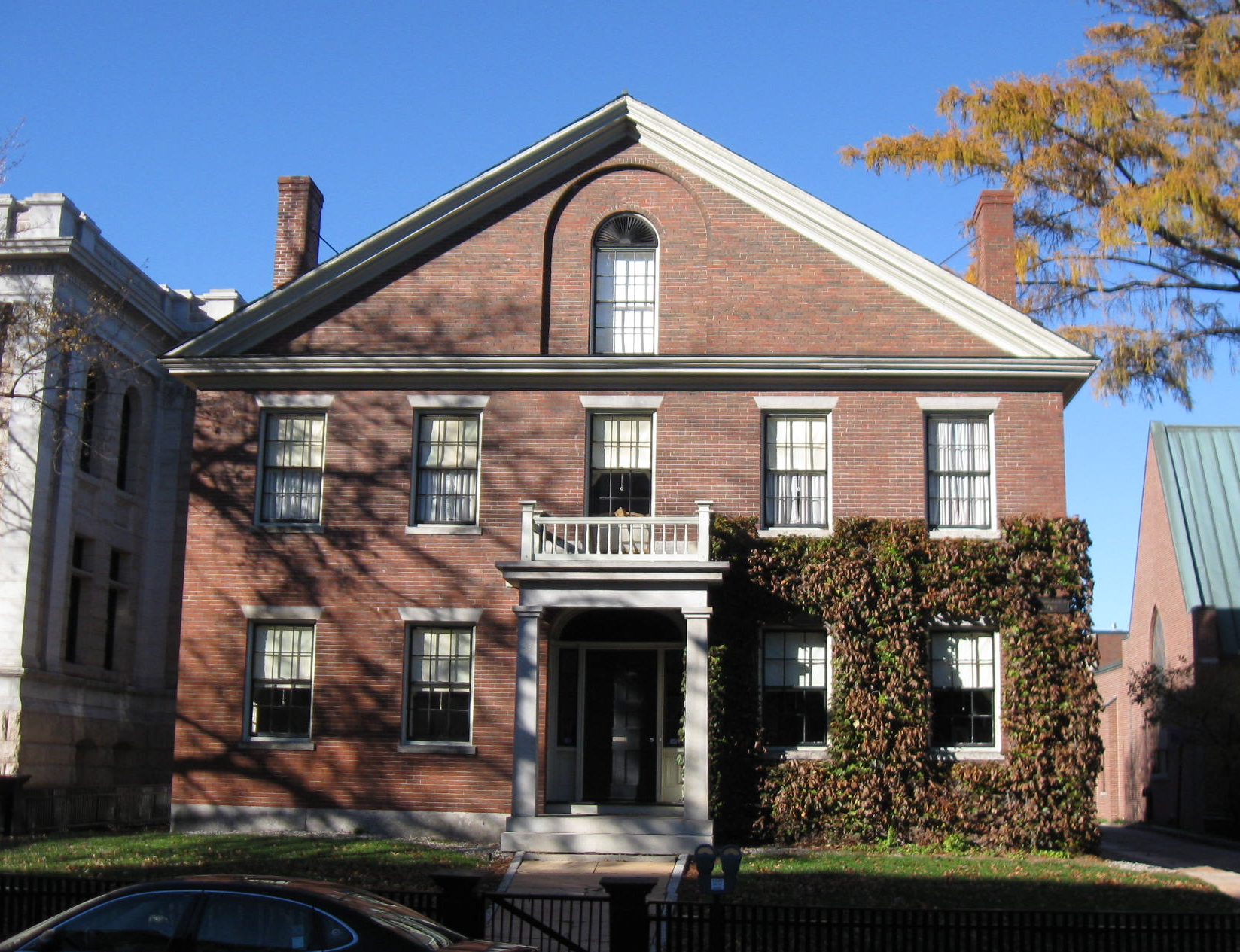

- Location within New Hampshire Location within the United States
- Location: 18 Park St., Concord, New Hampshire
- Coordinates: 43°12′26″N 71°32′20″W
- Area: 0.3 acres (0.12 ha)
- Built: 1831
- Architectural style: Federal
- NRHP reference No.: 80000418
- Added to NRHP: May 15, 1980

The Upham-Walker House is a historic house located at 18 Park Street in Concord, New Hampshire, United States. Built in 1831, it is the only remaining Federal-style house in central Concord. It is now owned by the state and used for special functions. It was listed on the National Register of Historic Places on May 15, 1980.

== Description and history ==
The Upham-Walker House is located on the north side of Park Street, opposite the New Hampshire State House and between the New Hampshire State Library and St. Paul's Episcopal Church. It is a 2½-story brick building, with a front-facing gabled roof. Its main facade is five bays wide, with a center entrance sheltered by a columned portico with a balustrade. The entry is flanked by sidelight windows. The main gable is fully pedimented, with a round-arch window set in a slightly recessed round-arch panel. The house exhibits some transitional Greek Revival features, including its gable-front orientation. Its interior reflects changing styles of the 19th century, with portions of the house reflecting styles of the early, middle, and later parts of that century.

The house was built in 1831 by Nathaniel Gookin Upham, and is the only remaining Federal-style house in central Concord. Upham, its first owner, went on to become an associate justice of the New Hampshire Supreme Court, and to sit on international tribunals. Later occupants included Rev. Sheafe Walker, a leading Episcopal minister, and Doctor Charles Rumford Walker. The house is now owned by the state, and is managed as a facility of the state legislature.

== See also ==
- National Register of Historic Places listings in Merrimack County, New Hampshire
