= Sphenomorphus derooyae =

Conservation status
- Least Concern (IUCN 3.1)

Scientific classification
- Kingdom: Animalia
- Phylum: Chordata
- Class: Reptilia
- Order: Squamata
- Family: Scincidae
- Genus: Sphenomorphus
- Species: S. derooyae

Binomial name
- Sphenomorphus derooyae (de Jong, 1927)

Synonyms
- Lygosoma derooyae de Jong, 1927; Sphenomorphus derooijae [sic] — Mys, 1988; Sphenomorphus derooyae — Pyron & Burbrink, 2013

Species of lizard

Sphenomorphus derooyae is a species of skink, a lizard in the family Scincidae. The species is native to Oceania.

== Geographic range ==
S. derooyae is found in New Guinea and in the Bismarck Archipelago, including Admiralty Islands, New Britain, and New Ireland.

== Habitat ==
The preferred natural habitat of S. derooyae is forest, at altitudes from sea level to 1,500 m (4,900 ft).

== Reproduction ==
S. derooyae is oviparous.

== Taxonomy ==
S. derooyae may be a species complex, and the proper name for populations outside the New Guinean mainland is uncertain.

== Etymology ==
The specific name, derooyae, is in honor of Dutch zoologist Nelly de Rooij (spelled "de Rooy" by de Jong).
