= Stegonotus guentheri =

Conservation status
- Data Deficient (IUCN 3.1)

Scientific classification
- Kingdom: Animalia
- Phylum: Chordata
- Class: Reptilia
- Order: Squamata
- Suborder: Serpentes
- Family: Colubridae
- Genus: Stegonotus
- Species: S. guentheri

Binomial name
- Stegonotus guentheri Boulenger, 1895

Species of snake

Stegonotus guentheri, also known commonly as the D'Entrecasteaux Archipelago ground snake and the Milne Bay ground snake, is a species of snake in the subfamily Colubrinae of the family Colubridae. The species is endemic to Papua New Guinea.

== Etymology ==
The specific name, guentheri, is in honor of German-British herpetologist Albert Günther.

== Habitat ==
The preferred natural habitat of S. guentheri is forest, at altitudes from sea level to 800 m (2,600 ft).

== Description ==
S. guentheri is brown dorsally, and yellowish white ventrally. The dorsal scales are arranged in 15 rows throughout the length of the body.

== Behavior ==
S. guentheri is terrestrial and nocturnal.

== Reproduction ==
S. guentheri is oviparous.
