= Stegonotus sutteri =

Conservation status
- Endangered (IUCN 3.1)

Scientific classification
- Kingdom: Animalia
- Phylum: Chordata
- Class: Reptilia
- Order: Squamata
- Suborder: Serpentes
- Family: Colubridae
- Genus: Stegonotus
- Species: S. sutteri

Binomial name
- Stegonotus sutteri Forcart, 1953

Species of snake

Stegonotus sutteri, the Sumba ground snake, is a species of snake of the family Colubridae.

The snake is found in Indonesia.
