= Stegonotus parvus =

Conservation status
- Least Concern (IUCN 3.1)

Scientific classification
- Kingdom: Animalia
- Phylum: Chordata
- Class: Reptilia
- Order: Squamata
- Suborder: Serpentes
- Family: Colubridae
- Genus: Stegonotus
- Species: S. parvus

Binomial name
- Stegonotus parvus (AB Meyer, 1874)

Species of snake

Stegonotus parvus, the Biak Island ground snake or common ground snake, is a species of snake of the family Colubridae.

The snake is found in Indonesia.
