= Stegonotus florensis =

Conservation status
- Data Deficient (IUCN 3.1)

Scientific classification
- Kingdom: Animalia
- Phylum: Chordata
- Class: Reptilia
- Order: Squamata
- Suborder: Serpentes
- Family: Colubridae
- Genus: Stegonotus
- Species: S. florensis

Binomial name
- Stegonotus florensis (de Rooij, 1917)

Species of snake

Stegonotus florensis, the Flores ground snake, is a species of snake of the family Colubridae.

The snake is found on Flores in Indonesia.
