= Stegonotus heterurus =

Conservation status
- Least Concern (IUCN 3.1)

Scientific classification
- Kingdom: Animalia
- Phylum: Chordata
- Class: Reptilia
- Order: Squamata
- Suborder: Serpentes
- Family: Colubridae
- Genus: Stegonotus
- Species: S. heterurus

Binomial name
- Stegonotus heterurus Boulenger, 1893

Species of snake

Stegonotus heterurus, the Bismark ground snake, is a species of snake of the family Colubridae.

The snake is found in Papua New Guinea.
