= Stegonotus australis =

Scientific classification
- Kingdom: Animalia
- Phylum: Chordata
- Class: Reptilia
- Order: Squamata
- Suborder: Serpentes
- Family: Colubridae
- Genus: Stegonotus
- Species: S. australis

Binomial name
- Stegonotus australis (Günther, 1872)

Species of snake

Stegonotus australis, the Australian ground snake, is a species of snake of the family Colubridae.

The snake is found in Australia.
