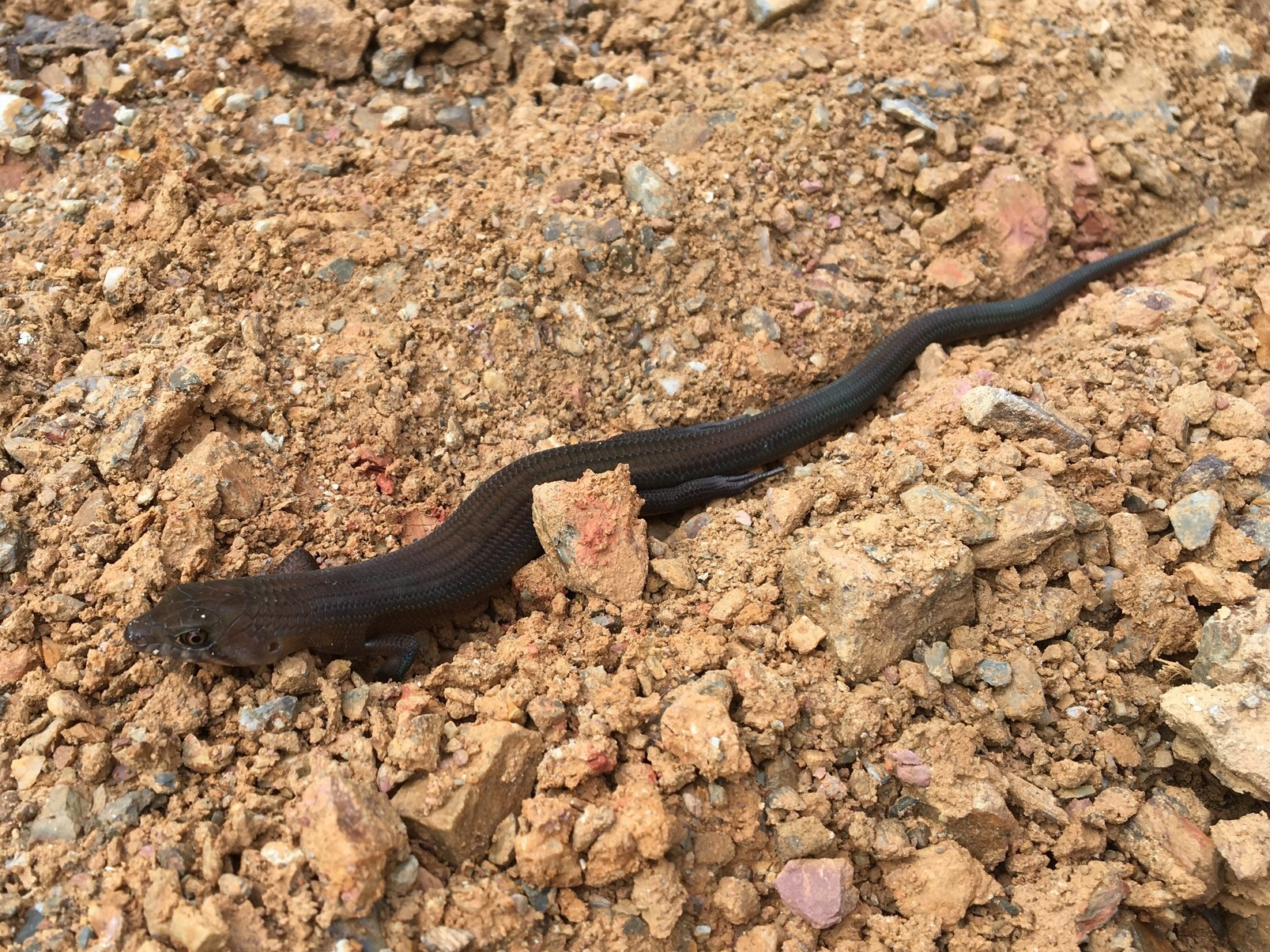

Conservation status
- Least Concern (IUCN 3.1)

Scientific classification
- Kingdom: Animalia
- Phylum: Chordata
- Class: Reptilia
- Order: Squamata
- Suborder: Scinciformata
- Infraorder: Scincomorpha
- Family: Eugongylidae
- Genus: Eugongylus
- Species: E. rufescens

Binomial name
- Eugongylus rufescens (Shaw, 1802)

= Eugongylus rufescens =

Species of lizard

The bar-lipped sheen-skink or unicolor recluse skink, (Eugongylus rufescens) is a species of lizard in the family Scincidae. It is found in Australia (Queensland), the Solomon Islands, Indonesia, and Admiralty Islands.
