= De Rooij's bow-fingered gecko =

Conservation status
- Least Concern (IUCN 3.1)

Scientific classification
- Kingdom: Animalia
- Phylum: Chordata
- Class: Reptilia
- Order: Squamata
- Suborder: Gekkota
- Family: Gekkonidae
- Genus: Cyrtodactylus
- Species: C. sermowaiensis

Binomial name
- Cyrtodactylus sermowaiensis (de Rooij, 1915)

Synonyms
- Gymnodactylus sermowaiensis de Rooij, 1915; Gonydactylus sermowaiensis (de Rooij, 1915)

Species of lizard

De Rooij's bow-fingered gecko or De Rooij's bent-toed gecko (Cyrtodactylus sermowaiensis) is a species of gecko. It is endemic to New Guinea and occurs in both Papua New Guinea and Western New Guinea (Indonesia).

Adults measure 78–112 mm (3.1–4.4 in) in snout–vent length.
