= Stegonotus lividus =

Conservation status
- Data Deficient (IUCN 3.1)

Scientific classification
- Kingdom: Animalia
- Phylum: Chordata
- Class: Reptilia
- Order: Squamata
- Suborder: Serpentes
- Family: Colubridae
- Genus: Stegonotus
- Species: S. lividus

Binomial name
- Stegonotus lividus (A.M.C. Duméril, Bibron & A.H.A. Duméril, 1854)

Species of snake

Stegonotus lividus, the Semau Island ground snake, is a species of snake of the family Colubridae.

The snake is found on Semau in Indonesia.
