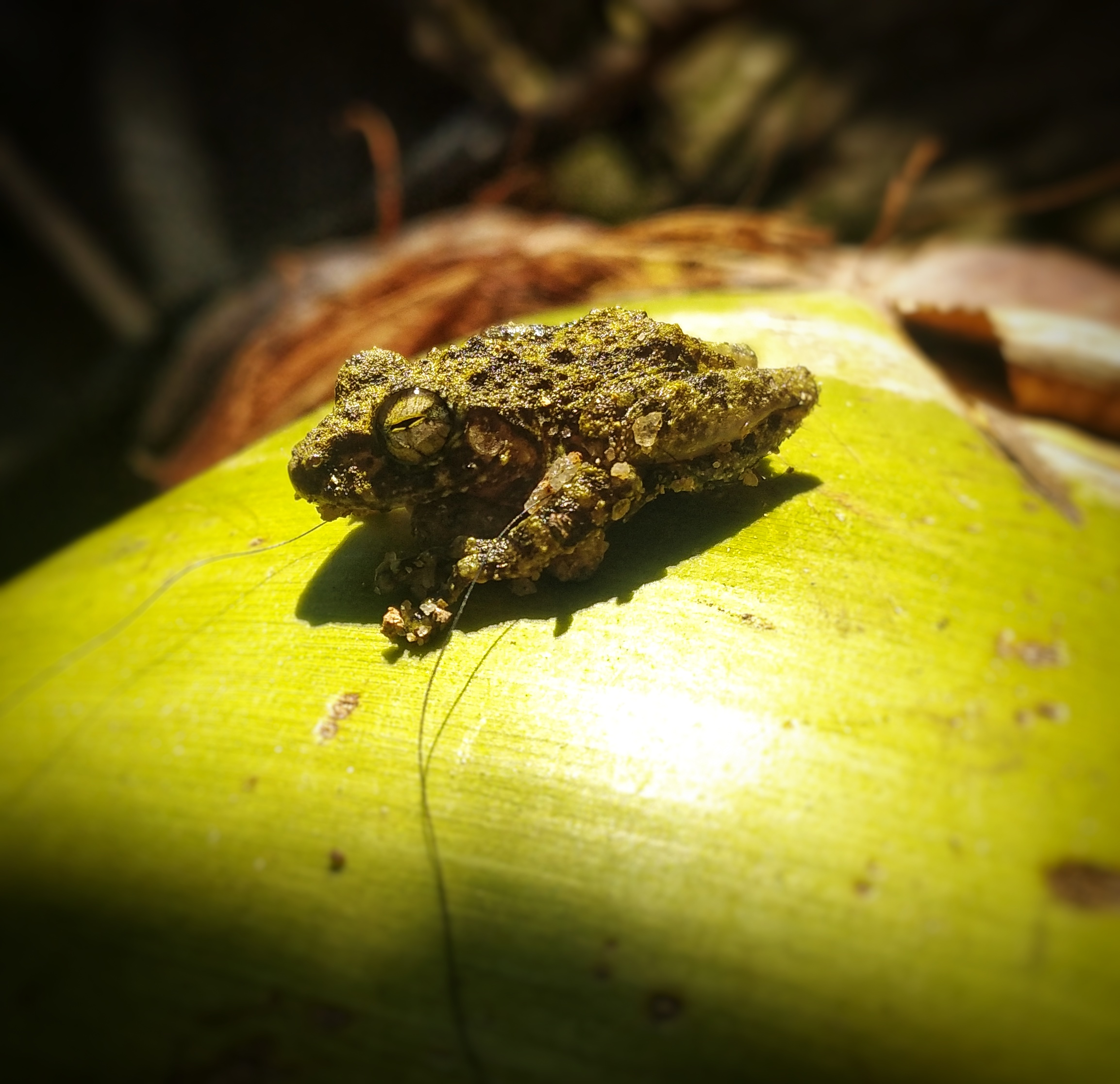

Conservation status
- Vulnerable (IUCN 3.1)

Scientific classification
- Kingdom: Animalia
- Phylum: Chordata
- Class: Amphibia
- Order: Anura
- Family: Rhacophoridae
- Genus: Pseudophilautus
- Species: P. hallidayi

Binomial name
- Pseudophilautus hallidayi (Meegaskumbura & Manamendra-Arachchi, 2005)

Synonyms
- Philautus hallidayi Meegaskumbura & Manamendra-Arachchi, 2005

= Pseudophilautus hallidayi =

Species of frog

Pseudophilautus hallidayi, known as Halliday's shrub frog, is a species of frog in the family Rhacophoridae.

It is endemic to Sri Lanka, where its natural habitats are subtropical or tropical moist lowland forests, subtropical or tropical moist montane forests, and rocky areas. It has become rare due to habitat loss.

It is named after the British herpetologist and artist Tim Halliday.
