= Sphenomorphus nigriventris =

Conservation status
- Least Concern (IUCN 3.1)

Scientific classification
- Kingdom: Animalia
- Phylum: Chordata
- Class: Reptilia
- Order: Squamata
- Suborder: Scinciformata
- Infraorder: Scincomorpha
- Family: Sphenomorphidae
- Genus: Sphenomorphus
- Species: S. nigriventris

Binomial name
- Sphenomorphus nigriventris (de Rooij, 1915)

Synonyms
- Lygosoma nigriventre de Rooij, 1915

Species of lizard

Sphenomorphus nigriventris is a species of skink. It is endemic to New Guinea and is found in both Papua New Guinea and Western New Guinea.
