= Stegonotus aruensis =

Conservation status
- Vulnerable (IUCN 3.1)

Scientific classification
- Kingdom: Animalia
- Phylum: Chordata
- Class: Reptilia
- Order: Squamata
- Suborder: Serpentes
- Family: Colubridae
- Genus: Stegonotus
- Species: S. aruensis

Binomial name
- Stegonotus aruensis (Doria, 1875)

Species of snake

Stegonotus aruensis, the Aru Islands ground snake, is a species of snake of the family Colubridae.

The snake is found on the Aru Islands in Indonesia.
