= Stegonotus borneensis =

Conservation status
- Least Concern (IUCN 3.1)

Scientific classification
- Kingdom: Animalia
- Phylum: Chordata
- Class: Reptilia
- Order: Squamata
- Suborder: Serpentes
- Family: Colubridae
- Genus: Stegonotus
- Species: S. borneensis

Binomial name
- Stegonotus borneensis Inger, 1967

Species of snake

Stegonotus borneensis, the Borneo ground snake, Borneo frog-eating snake, or Bornean black snake, is a species of snake of the family Colubridae.

The snake is found in Indonesia, Malaysia, and Brunei.
