= Sphenomorphus longicaudatus =

Conservation status
- Least Concern (IUCN 3.1)

Scientific classification
- Kingdom: Animalia
- Phylum: Chordata
- Class: Reptilia
- Order: Squamata
- Suborder: Scinciformata
- Infraorder: Scincomorpha
- Family: Sphenomorphidae
- Genus: Sphenomorphus
- Species: S. longicaudatus

Binomial name
- Sphenomorphus longicaudatus (de Rooij, 1915)

Species of lizard

Sphenomorphus longicaudatus is a species of skink. It is found in Papua New Guinea.
