= Stegonotus batjanensis =

Conservation status
- Data Deficient (IUCN 3.1)

Scientific classification
- Kingdom: Animalia
- Phylum: Chordata
- Class: Reptilia
- Order: Squamata
- Suborder: Serpentes
- Family: Colubridae
- Genus: Stegonotus
- Species: S. batjanensis

Binomial name
- Stegonotus batjanensis Günther, 1865

Species of snake

Stegonotus batjanensis, the Bacan Island ground snake or Batjan frog-eating snake, is a species of snake of the family Colubridae.

The snake is found in Indonesia.
