= West Midlands Safari Park =

Safari park in Worcestershire, England

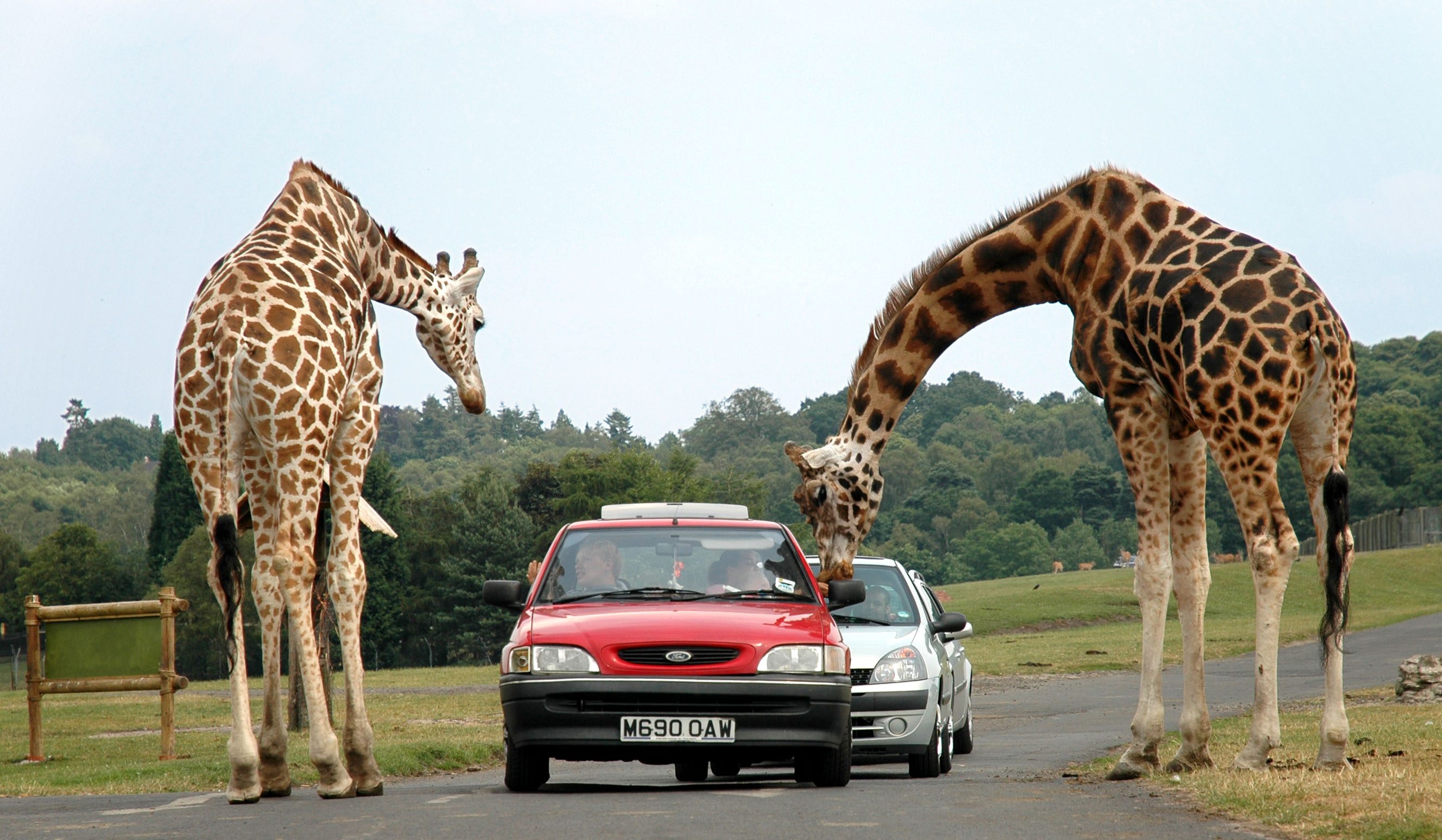
- Giraffes at the park
- Interactive map of West Midlands Safari Park
- 52.3754944°N 2.2882462°W
- Date opened: 17 April 1973
- Location: Bewdley, Worcestershire, England
- Land area: 200 acres (81 ha)
- No. of animals: 600
- No. of species: 165
- Annual visitors: 750,000+
- Memberships: BIAZA, EAZA
- Major exhibits: African Plains, Flooded Forest, Mark O'Shea's Reptile World, Sea Lion Theatre, Land of the Living Dinosaurs, and others
- Owner: Looping Experiences
- Website: wmsp.co.uk/index.php

West Midlands Safari Park is a safari park located in Bewdley, Worcestershire, England. It was opened under the name West Midland Safari Park in spring 1973.

The park holds more than 165 species of exotic animals and features other attractions such as a small theme park. The park contains the largest groups of white lions, cheetahs, hippopotamuses and meerkats in the UK, as well as the largest lemur walk-through exhibit. It was also the first park in the UK to have the African big five game animals.

The park is a member of the British and Irish Association of Zoos and Aquariums (BIAZA) and the European Association of Zoos and Aquaria (EAZA). The Dhole and Cheetah enclosures in the drive-through safari are part of a larger heathland Site of Special Scientific Interest (SSSI), which the park is restoring.

== History ==
The park was opened by founder Jimmy Chipperfield on 17 April 1973 and hosted a few former circus animals. The park also had a dolphin area where the sea lion theatre is today, but it was a travelling show and the dolphins were later returned to Margate. The 1970s also saw the park develop a "boat safari", although it was later removed. A narrow-gauge railway through parts of the park was constructed by Severn Lamb in 1979.

In 2004, the park featured its first new animal attraction for some time with the arrival of four African white lions in the Kingdom of the White Lions exhibit. The park was the first safari park in the UK to have all five African big game animals, although its leopards have since been moved to Scotland and the last remaining Cape buffalo left in 2022. It was also the first park or zoo in Europe successfully to breed white lion cubs and has made efforts to conserve the species.

In 2006, the managing directors officially opened the Ongava Research Centre on the Ongava Game Reserve near the Etosha National Park, the "sister park" in Namibia. The centre focuses on researching lions and rhinoceroses, and carrying capacity of the reserves, which hold many rare animals. The centre has three full-time researchers who work closely with Save the Rhino and the University of Cape Town.

In June 2023, following public feedback, the drive-through safari must be booked via an allocated time slot, which is included in the admission, or it can be booked free at the main ticket office. The drive-through safari may be done only once per visit.

In 2024, the park updated its name to "West Midlands Safari Park".

== Sections ==
=== African Plain ===
The African Plain is home to southern white rhinoceroses, common elands, ellipsen waterbucks, African forest buffaloes, red lechwes, Burchell's zebras, Grevy's zebras, Rothschild's giraffes and Ankole cattle.

=== The Grasslands ===
The Grasslands section is home to Persian fallow deer, blesbok and Barbary sheep.

=== Wild Woods ===
Wild Woods is home to a group of dholes.

=== Wild Asia and Realm of the Indian Rhino ===
Wild Asia is home to banteng, blackbuck, Formosan sika deer, Philippine spotted deer and swamp deer. The Realm of the Indian rhino is home to four Indian rhinoceroses.

On 8 September 2020, an Indian rhinoceros calf was born, a first for the park.

=== White Tiger Ridge ===
White Tiger Ridge was removed during a change in road layout in 2019. All tigers are now located in the Tiger Reserve located in the Eurasian Reserve.

=== Cheetah Plains ===
Cheetah Plains is the UK's largest drive-by cheetah reserve.

=== African Wild Dog Reserve ===
The African Wild Dog Reserve is home to a group of African wild dogs.

=== Realm of the Lions ===
Realm of the Lions is a fully landscaped reserve and off-road track featuring a pride of African lions.

=== Kingdom of the White Lions ===
Kingdom of the White Lions is home to a pride of rare white lions.

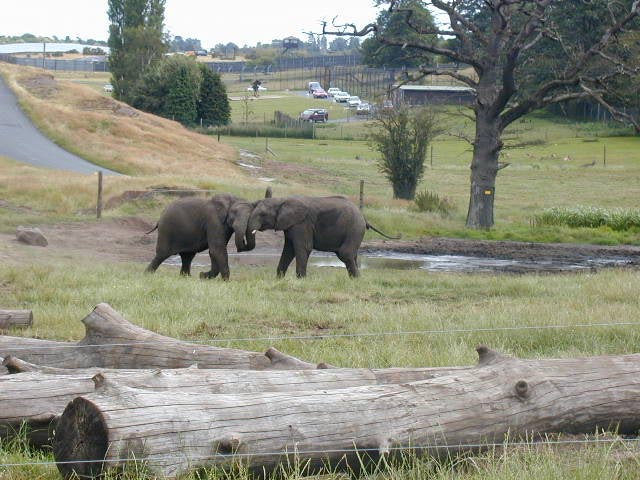
Two African elephants at the park

=== Eurasian Reserve and Tiger Reserve ===
Eurasian Reserve is home to Javan banteng, nilgai and Père David's deer. The Tiger Reserve is home to Bengal tigers and endangered Sumatran tigers.

=== Elephant Valley ===
Elephant Valley is home to the safari's African elephants.

In 2021, the construction of a new elephant reserve was completed. Currently the park holds one elephant: That being Five, as Sutton had moved to a different park.

=== The Borderlands ===
Formerly the elephants' enclosure, Borderlands is home to a herd of Bactrian camels.

== Conservation ==
West Midland Safari Park is known for its efforts in conservation. The park contains many animals that are on the IUCN's Endangered or Critically Endangered list.

In May 2014, the park's Elephant Valley became home to the first male African elephant successfully born as the result of artificial insemination in the UK.

== Amusement-park rides ==
| Opened | Name | Manufacturer | Description |
|---|---|---|---|
| 1985 | Congo Carousel | Robert Tidman | Classic gallopers ride, operated previously at Happy Hour Amusement Park, Colwyn Bay |
| 1986 | Jungle Swings | Nick Beach | A classic chair-o-plane ride |
| 1986 | Jungle Cat Dodgems | I.E. Park | Cat-themed dodgems |
| 2006 | Venom Tower Drop | Fabbri | A 105 ft drop tower ride. |
| 1996 | Zambezi Water Splash | Reverchon Industries | A standard two-drop log flume |
| 2002 | Black Fly | Fabbri | A frisbee ride similar to Sky-Force at Flambards Theme Park |
| 1992 | Dr. Umboto's Catacombs | Supercar | A ghost train ride |
| 2004 | Jumbo Parade | Fabbri | An elephant-themed jets ride cheaper version of Dumbo At Disneyland |
| 1983 | Pirate Ship | HUSS Park Attractions | A classic pirate ship ride similar to The Bounty At Drayton Manor and The Blade At Alton Towers |
| 1995 | Hurtling Hippos | Bakker Denies | A polyp ride, formerly named Tarantula, Spider and Cape Octopus; operated previously at Codona's Amusement Park |
| 1992 | Rhinocoaster | Vekoma | A junior rollercoaster formerly named Rollerskater |
| 1988 | African Big Apple | Pinfari | An MB28 junior rollercoaster |
| 1998 | Monkey Mayhem | Reverchon Industries | A spinning wild mouse roller coaster, formerly named Walls Twister Coaster |
| 1999/2000 | Slippery Snake Slide | Chris Randall | A snake-themed tube slide |
| 2014 | Kong | Zamperla | A gorilla-themed Mega Disk'O |
| 2023 | Dino Dashers | Zamperla | A Jump Around ride |

== Former rides ==
| Name | Opened | Closed | Manufacturer | Description |
|---|---|---|---|---|
| Cobra | 1985 | 1991 | Vekoma | A standard Vekoma boomerang replaced with the Rhinocoaster |
| Safari Express | 1979 | 2014 | Severn Lamb | A 2mm narrow gauge train that took passengers from the amusement park to the car park. Closed in 2014 to make way for the dinosaur exhibit. |
| Shark Island | 2009 | 2022 | Shenyang Chuangqi A.E. | An interactive water roundabout |
| Wild River Rafting | 2006 | 2023 | Fabbri Group | a river rapids ride |

== Land of the Living Dinosaurs and Ice Age ==
Land of the Living Dinosaurs is a walk-through attraction featuring animatronic dinosaurs and fossils, opening in 2015. Followed by Ice Age, a similar walk-through attraction displaying animatronic creatures from the Ice Age, opening in 2018.

== Discovery Trail ==
Discovery Trail consists of mostly indoor exhibits and includes animal encounters. Visitors can come near small exotic creatures while under the observation of staff members. Encounter animals include ferrets, lesser hedgehog tenrecs and long-tailed chinchillas.

== Penguin Cove ==
Penguin Cove is home to Humboldt penguins. Their enclosure includes a pool with a semi-submerged beach, sculptures, penguin house and public viewing areas.

== Lorikeet Landing ==
This new heated indoor exhibit is home to a flock of Rainbow lorikeets. A specially designed walkthrough enclosure includes eco-heating to maintain a temperature of 18 °C.

== Creepy Crawlies ==
Creepy Crawlies is the park's insect house and contains a small range of animals such as tarantulas, Goliath birdeater spiders, leafcutter ants, locusts, Madagascar hissing cockroaches and scorpions.

== Reptile World ==
The park's reptile house was formerly named after the famous herpetologist Mark O'Shea, who occasionally performed during the reptile-encounter events. Reptiles and amphibians in this exhibit include alligator snapping turtles, American alligators, amethystine pythons, beaded lizards, black rat snakes, Borneo short-tailed pythons, Cuban crocodiles, Eastern diamondback rattlesnakes, Egyptian cobras, frill-necked lizards, green anacondas, green and black poison dart frogs, green tree pythons, Jamaican boas, king cobras, malagasy giant hognose snakes, Nile crocodiles, red-eyed crocodile skinks, red-eyed treefrogs, red-tailed green ratsnakes, reticulated pythons, Saharan horned vipers and western diamondback rattlesnakes.

== Sea Lion Theatre ==
The Sea Lion Theatre is a 525-seat venue that allows visitors to see the parks’ Californian sea lions performing tricks in a 25-minute show.

== SeaQuarium ==
SeaQuarium is the park's aquarium, containing a wide variety of exotic fish. This is also the park's chain attraction. Some of the animals include Asian arowana, Bermuda blue angelfish, chocolate chip star, clownfish, common carp, emperor angelfish, gold-spotted spinefoot, honeycomb moray, long-spine porcupinefish, orangespine, unicornfish, orbicular batfish, pangas catfish, queen coris, red-bellied pacu, red-bellied piranhas, Red Sea sailfin tang, redtail catfish, redtoothed triggerfish, reef stonefish, Siberian sturgeons, small-spotted catsharks, snowflake moray, spotted sailfin suckermouth catfish, spotted unicornfish, tambaqui, Vlamingii tang, white-spotted pufferfish and zebra moray.

== Twilight Cave ==
The Twilight Cave is a walkthrough exhibit containing free-flying Rodrigues fruit bats and Seba's leaf-nosed bats. Nocturnal exhibits within this area are home to night monkeys.

== African Villages ==
=== Goat Walk ===
The African Village is an interactive walkthrough area allowing visitors to see African village wildlife and a replica African village home. The Goat Walk contains a walkthrough area containing Cameroon sheep, pygmy goats and Somali sheep. Further up the bank from the Goat Walk there is a group of ostriches, and addax were formerly held there.

=== Meet the Meerkats ===
This exhibit is home to a large mob of meerkats.

=== Walking with Lemurs ===
This is the largest walkthrough lemur wood in the UK, with three lemur species: ring-tailed, white-fronted brown and red-bellied.

=== Hippo Lakes ===
A large number of lakes may be found in the amusement area. One of these has become home to the largest pod of hippopotamuses in the UK.
