= Borneo bow-fingered gecko =

Scientific classification
- Domain: Eukaryota
- Kingdom: Animalia
- Phylum: Chordata
- Class: Reptilia
- Order: Squamata
- Infraorder: Gekkota
- Family: Gekkonidae
- Genus: Cyrtodactylus
- Species: C. malayanus

Binomial name
- Cyrtodactylus malayanus (de Rooij, 1915)

Synonyms
- Gymnodactylus malayanus

Species of lizard

The Borneo bow-fingered gecko (Cyrtodactylus malayanus) is a species of gecko that is endemic to Borneo.
