= Charles Walker (cricketer, born 1851) =

English cricketer

Personal information
- Full name: Charles William Walker
- Born: 11 January 1851; Bradford, Yorkshire, England
- Died: 3 December 1941 (aged 90); Palmerston North, New Zealand
- Batting: Right-handed
- Bowling: Right-arm slow
- Relatives: Ashley Walker (cousin)

Career statistics
| Competition | First-class |
|---|---|
| Matches | 1 |
| Runs scored | 59 |
| Batting average | 29.50 |
| 100s/50s | –/– |
| Top score | 40 |
| Balls bowled | 104 |
| Wickets | 0 |
| Bowling average | – |
| 5 wickets in innings | – |
| 10 wickets in match | – |
| Best bowling | – |
| Catches/stumpings | –/– |
- Source: Cricinfo, 16 November 2019

Charles William Walker (11 January 1851 – 3 December 1941) was an English first-class cricketer.

The son of Charles Walker, he was born in January 1851 at Bolling Hall, Bradford. He was educated at Harrow School, where he captained the cricket eleven in 1870. He made a single appearance in first-class cricket for the Gentlemen of the North against the Gentlemen of the South at Beeston in 1870. Batting twice in the match, he was dismissed for 19 runs in the Gentlemen of the South first-innings by W. G. Grace, while in their second-innings he was dismissed for 40 runs by Fred Grace. With his right-arm slow bowling, he bowled a total of 26 wicketless overs across the match.

After leaving Harrow, Walker went into business, before emigrating to New Zealand in the 1870s and settling in the Manawatu region. He married a widow, Fanny Randolph, in Palmerston North in July 1911. She died in 1925. He died at Palmerston North in December 1941. His cousin, Ashley Walker, also played first-class cricket.

Cricinfo gives an incorrect date of death (2 March 1915). This is for the death of a different Charles William Walker, born in 1854, who died in Auckland, New Zealand.
