= Agila: The EKsperience =

Flight motion simulation

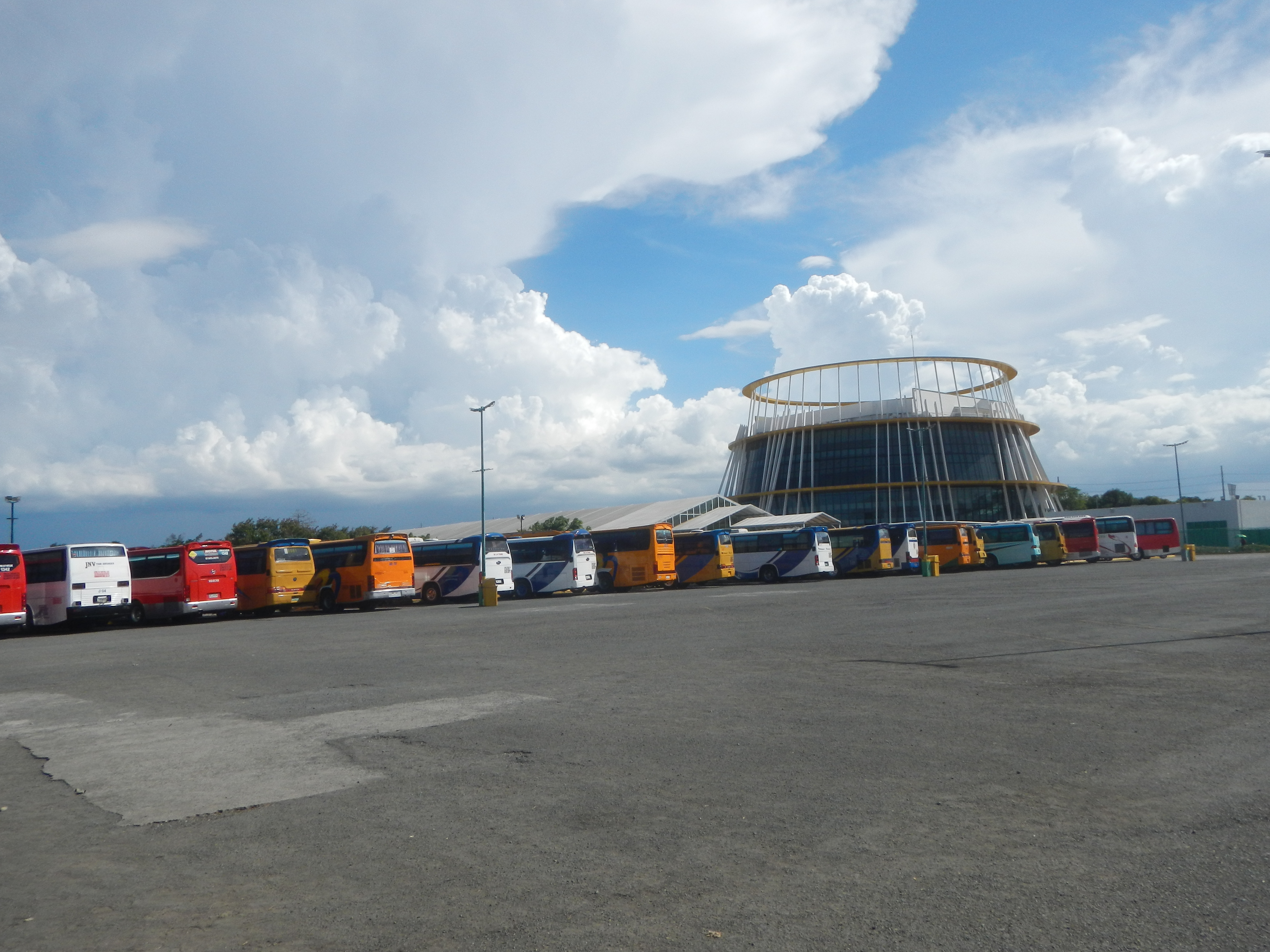
- Agila as seen from the parking.

Enchanted Kingdom
- Area: Cultural Village
- Coordinates: 14.28061°N 121.09640°E
- Status: Operating
- Soft opening date: December 7, 2016
- Opening date: December 11, 2016

Ride statistics
- Attraction type: Simulator ride
- Designer: SimEx-Iwerks; Rhetroactive
- Theme: Philippine tourist attractions
- Site area: 6,000 m^{2} (65,000 sq ft)
- Participants per group: 105
- Duration: 6:00
- Attraction building architect: DQA Design & Planning
- Film resolution: 6K

Agila: The EKsperience is a flight motion simulation attraction situated in Enchanted Kingdom, a theme park in Santa Rosa, Laguna, Philippines.

== Ride design ==
The attraction was custom designed for Enchanted Kingdom by Canadian firm SimEx-Iwerks Entertainment. A new patented system called SkyRide was used in the designing of the ride. A large projection screen is part of the ride which is touted to be the largest in Southeast Asia and among the largest screens in the world. Los Angeles-based firm Rhetroactive was also involved with the attraction's design.

Agila: The EKsperience is housed inside a 10-storey high circular building which is meant to symbolize the sun in the Philippine flag. The attraction covers a footprint of 6,000 square meters (65,000 sq ft) which makes Agila the largest attraction of Enchanted Kingdom. The attraction building was designed by local firm DQA Design & Planning.

A six-minute film with 6K resolution is projected in the curved screen featuring 20 locations in the Philippines. The film was taken through aerial videography by a cinematographer and Emmy Award winner who has taken shots featured in the Survivor television series and the film Titanic. The film which is projected in a 544 square meters (5,860 sq ft) screen was shot in 10 days. "4D" motion theater technology is used for the attraction. The attraction is targeted to both domestic and foreign tourists. The attraction devises wind, water, mist and scent effects to stimulate multiple senses of its patrons, and also uses a combination of overhead stereo speakers and seat bass shakers.

The premise of the attraction involves Eldar the Wizard, the Enchanted Kingdom mascot introducing the attraction's visitor to his companion Agila who takes the visitors to a "quest to restore the light to the fading gems stones of Earth, Water and Air" and transports the visitors to various points in the Philippines.

The attraction has a seating capacity of 105 people, accommodating that many people at any one time. The motion-based seating of the attraction has three tiers.

== History ==
In 2015, Enchanted Kingdom announced that it would be opening a new attraction which was then named "AGILA Flying Theater". This announcement was in lieu with Enchanted Kingdom's partnership with the Philippine Eagle Foundation to help with the protection and conservation efforts of the endangered Philippine eagle. Construction of the attraction already began in March 2015.

Agila: The EKsperience is touted to boost Enchanted Kingdom's annual attendance by at least one million visitors to breach the two million annual visitor mark which could place the amusement park as among the top 30 theme parks in the Asia Pacific region.

It was initially scheduled to be opened in June 2016 but by October 2016, the opening date of the attraction was moved to December 2016.

On November 28, 2016, Enchanted Kingdom has signed a Memorandum of Agreement with GMA Network for the promotion of the attraction.

On December 7, 2016, the attraction had its soft opening. On December 11, 2016, it had its grand opening. It is the first attraction of the theme park's Cultural Village.
