= Stegonotus reticulatus =

Scientific classification
- Kingdom: Animalia
- Phylum: Chordata
- Class: Reptilia
- Order: Squamata
- Suborder: Serpentes
- Family: Colubridae
- Genus: Stegonotus
- Species: S. reticulatus

Binomial name
- Stegonotus reticulatus Boulenger, 1895

Species of snake

Stegonotus reticulatus, the reticulate ground snake, is a species of snake of the family Colubridae.

The snake is found in Papua New Guinea.
