= Charles Walker (liturgist) =

Charles Walker (died 1887) was a liturgist and author. He was associated with St Michael's, Brighton, in the 1860s.

== The Ritual Reason Why ==
Walker wrote and edited two editions of the book The Ritual Reason Why (1st Edition, 1866; Second enlarged Edition, 1868 - published by J.T. Hayes of 17 Henrietta Street, Covent Garden). This book was "designed to give a rationale of ceremonial worship" in the Church of England. Walker was moved by the conviction that "much of the opposition to ritual" in the Anglican Church was "due to a mistaken or inadequate view of its meaning and intention". Further, he noted that "Scripture itself teaches us the duty of instructing the people in the rationale of divine ceremonial; the objective end of which it is that it 'may be a sign among us, that when our children ask – what mean ye by these things,' we may 'Answer them.'" (Joshua 4:6).

== Other works ==
Other publications include: The Liturgy of the Church of Sarum; The Services of the Church; Oswald, the Young Artist – a Tale for Boys ("inculcating the necessity of a reverential attention when assisting in the public worship"); A Prayer Book for the Young; and Devotions on the Communion of Saints.

== See also ==
- Anglo-Catholicism
- Ritualism
