= Meadow Road, Beeston =

Cricket ground in Nottinghamshire, England

Coordinates: 52.91949°N 1.20795°W

Meadow Road
Ground information
- Location: Beeston, Nottinghamshire
- Establishment: 1867 (first recorded match)

Team information
Gentlemen of the North	(1870)
- As of 31 August 2010; Source: Ground profile

Meadow Road was a cricket ground in Beeston, Nottinghamshire. The first recorded match on the ground was in 1867, when the Gentlemen of Nottinghamshire played the Gentlemen of Lincolnshire. In 1870, the ground hosted its only first-class match when the Gentlemen of the North played the Gentlemen of the South. The last recorded match on the ground came in 1961 when Nottinghamshire Juniors played Derbyshire Juniors.

The ground is today covered by a technology park.
