= Tim Halliday =

British herpetologist and artist (1945–2019)

- Born: 11 September 1945; Marlborough
- Died: 10 April 2019 (aged 73)
- Alma mater: Marlborough College; University of Oxford
- Occupation: Herpetologist
- Website: www.hallidayfarndon.co.uk

Professor Timothy Richard Halliday was a British herpetologist and artist.

He was born on 11 September 1945 in Marlborough, Wiltshire, to Edna (née Barlow) who was a housemistress at Marlborough College, her husband, Jack Halliday was a biology teacher there.

He was educated at Marlborough College, then studied zoology at Oxford University, where his doctoral thesis was on the sexual behaviour of newts.

He joined the Open University in 1977, as a lecturer in biology, and by his retirement in 2009 was a professor of biology.

He played a key role in organising the 1989 'First World Congress of Herpetology' at the University of Kent, and was instrumental in the creation of the Declining Amphibian Populations Task Force, and served as its international director from 1994 to 2006. He also helped to establish the TRITURUS network of newt researchers.

Between 1990 and 1998 he seat on the council of the Zoological Society of London (ZSL), as well as chairing its conservation committee. He was also an advisor for David Attenborough's programmes Life on Earth and Life in Cold Blood.

As an artist, Halliday specialised in painting birds, frogs and toads.

He married Carolyn Wheeler (who had been the first female pupil at Marlborough College) in 1970. They first met at nursery school. She also studied zoology at Oxford. They lived in Oxford and had three children and two grandchildren. All survive him.

He died on 10 April 2019, after being diagnosed with an rare and incurable form of T-cell lymphoma in 2016.

The species Pseudophilautus hallidayi, Halliday's shrub frog, is named in his honour.

The Amphibian Survival Alliance and IUCN SSC Amphibian Specialist Group dedicated a special issue of their journal FrogLog to Halliday in November 2018. An ZSL symposium on amphibian diseases held in late April 2019 was also dedicated to Halliday.

== Publications ==
- Halliday T. 1980. Sexual Strategy. -(Survival in the Wild). Oxford and Melbourne: Oxford University Press. 158 pp. ISBN 0-19-217707-9.
- O'Shea M, Halliday T. 2002. Smithsonian Handbooks: Reptiles and Amphibians. London: DK Publishing. 256 pp. ISBN 0-7894-9393-4.
- The Book of Frogs. Ivy Press. 2016. ISBN 978-1782402787.
