= Enchanted Kingdom =

Theme park in the Philippines

- The front gate of the theme park
- Interactive map of Enchanted Kingdom
- Location: San Lorenzo South, Santa Rosa, Laguna, Philippines
- Coordinates: 14.2819473°N 121.0953936°E
- Status: Operating
- Opened: October 19, 1995; 31 years ago
- Owner: Enchanted Kingdom, Inc.
- Slogan: "The Magic Lives Forever!"
- Operating season: Year-round
- Attendance: 1.8 million (2015)
- Area: 25 hectares (62 acres)

Attractions
- Total: 32
- Roller coasters: 3
- Water rides: 4
- Website: enchantedkingdom.ph

Enchanted Kingdom (abbreviated as EK) is a theme park in the Philippines. It is located along RSBS Boulevard (San Lorenzo Road) in Santa Rosa, Laguna. It has a land area of 25 hectares (62 acres). The park is managed and operated by Enchanted Kingdom Inc.

Enchanted Kingdom is a member of the International Association of Amusement Parks and Attractions (IAAPA).

== History ==
=== Foundation ===
The theme park was founded by Mario and Cynthia Mamon. Their family frequently visited local theme parks such as Boom na Boom, Big Bang sa Alabang, and Fiesta Carnival, all of which inspired the couple to open a theme park of their own. While they were visiting Ocean Park in Hong Kong in the early 1990s, they attended an amusement conference being held in the country where they were then introduced to the International Association of Amusement Parks and Attractions (IAAPA). Realizing the group can help them enter the amusement park industry, they joined the association in 1992 following their first trade show attendance in Dallas, Texas.

Aside from being the founder and President of Enchanted Kingdom, Mario Mamon is the first Asian and first Filipino to head the International Association of Amusement Parks and Attractions or IAAPA.

=== Construction ===
The IAAPA assisted the Mamons in getting consultants, contractors, and suppliers to set up Enchanted Kingdom. Gary Goddard, who was then with Landmark Entertainment, designed and planned the park while Cincinnati-based firm International Theme Park Services, Inc., served as consultants, especially on issues such as safety and operations, for the first three years. Construction on the park began in August 1994 on a property covering 10 hectares (25 acres). Construction was rushed to beat potential competitors, and the park officially opened to the public on October 19, 1995.

=== Operation ===
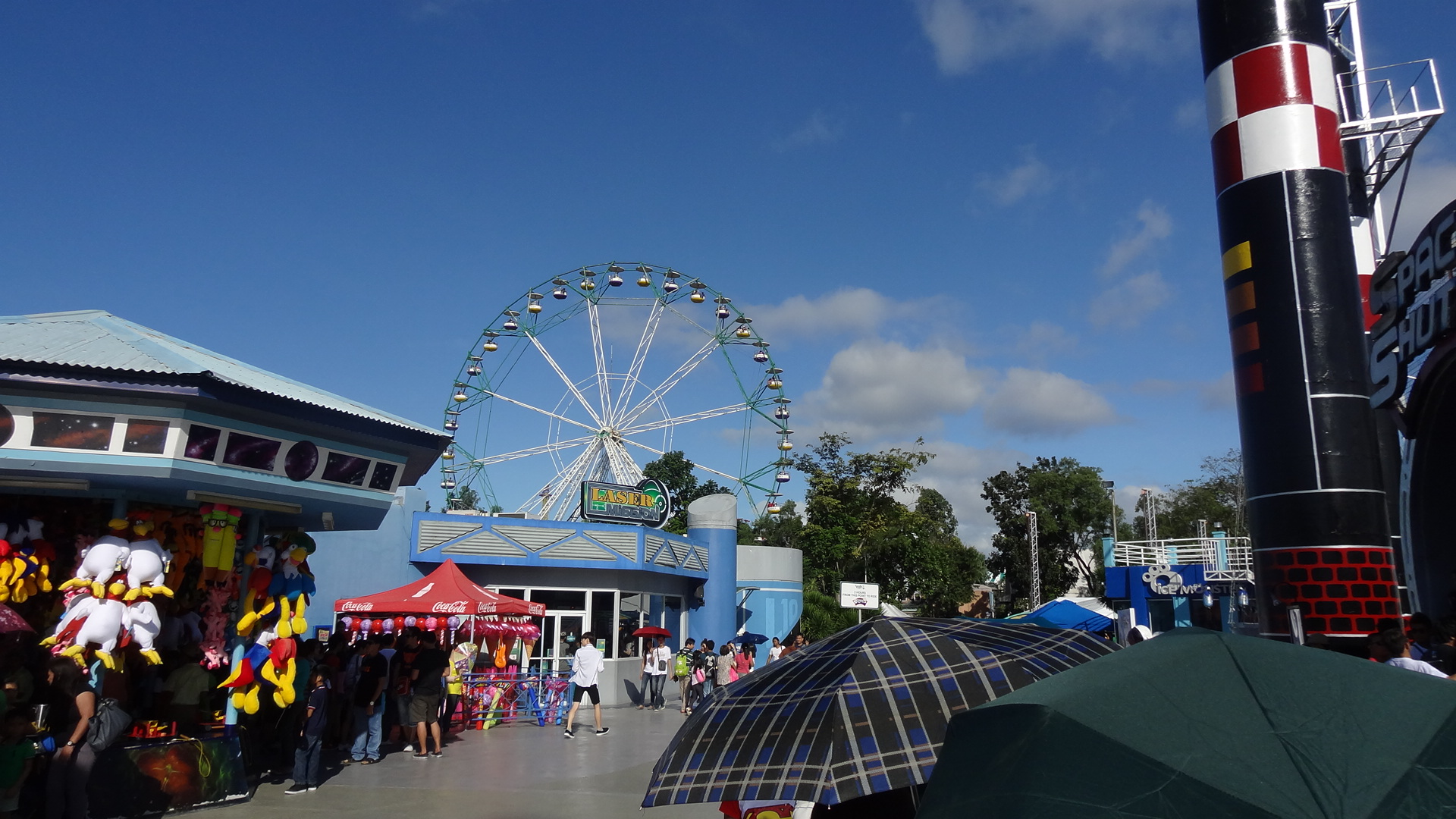
The theme park in January 2015, with the Wheel of Fate, a Ferris wheel in the background.

Operations of Enchanted Kingdom were difficult in its first years from 1995 to 2002, with the 1997 Asian financial crisis, affecting the business significantly only recovering from the financial breakdown in 2003. When business stabilized, the management began introducing two entertainment units per year. Business grew and was later registered the highest daytime visit to an amusement park in Region IV (Calabarzon and Mimaropa regions) according to the Department of Tourism. Domestic visitors comprise the majority of the amusement park's visitors.

In early 2020, the park's operations were halted due to the COVID-19 pandemic. Its operations have been resumed and halted multiple times due to the pandemic, last reopening on November 6, 2021. The amusement park's operations was suspended again from January 5 to February 24, 2022 due to the increase of Omicron cases.

== Future expansion ==
In 2016, Enchanted Kingdom began a 10-year expansion which includes the redevelopment of the existing theme park and addition of new zones, a regional convention center, a water park and a lifestyle center.

== Layout and design ==
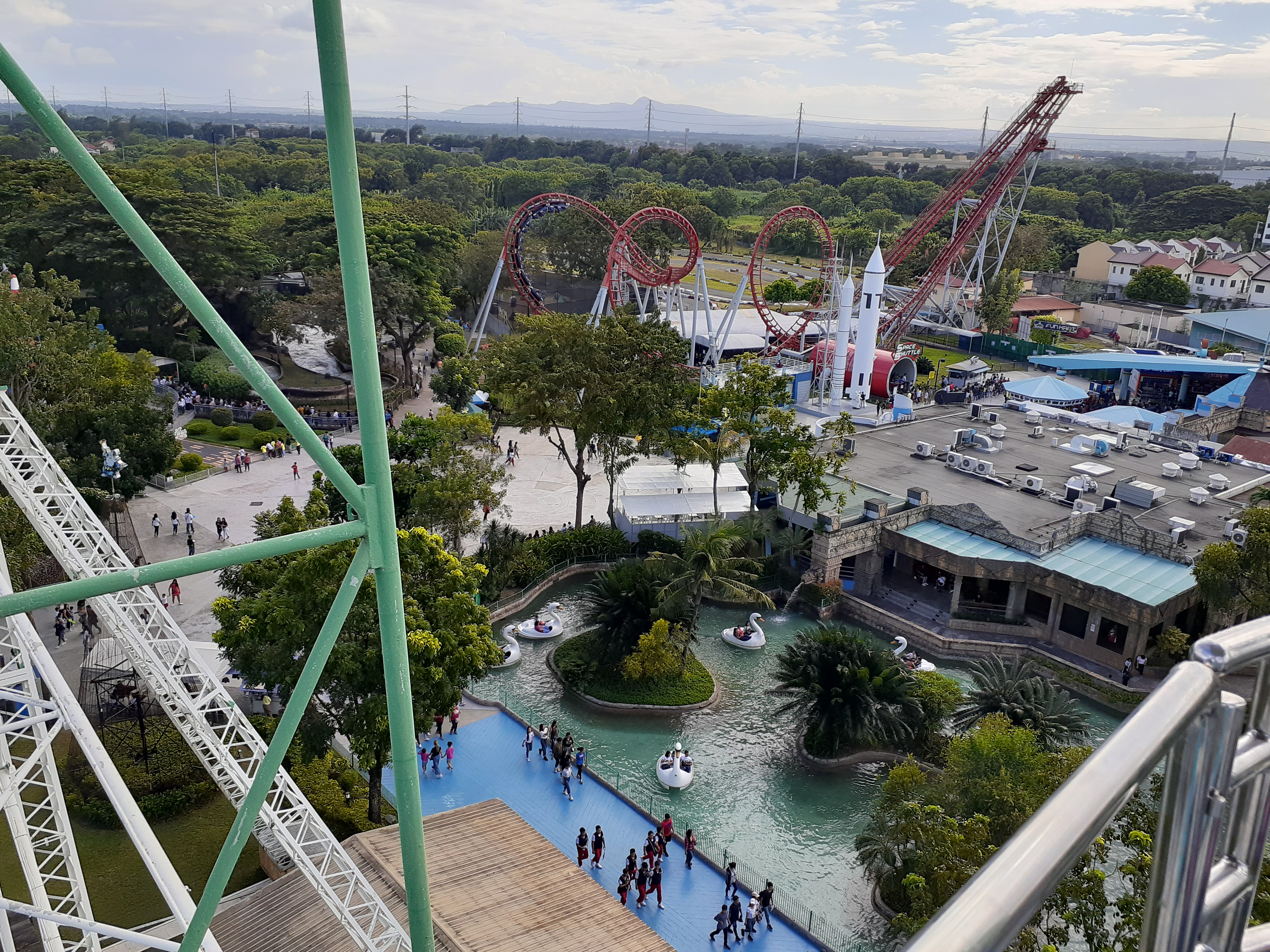
Aerial view of the theme park in October 2019, from the Wheel of Fate.

The initial design of the park presented to the Mamons by consultants was heavily inspired by Philippine architecture. The concept was rejected since the Mamons preferred a fantasy-oriented design, with Mario Mamon saying it would result in visitors seeing what they see "outside in their normal lives" which he remarks would sort of "break the magic".

The park currently has nine themed zones that host various rides, shops, restaurants, and event venues. The zones are Victoria Park, Portabello, Boulderville, Midway Boardwalk, Brooklyn Place, Spaceport, Jungle Outpost, Eldar's Village, and Cultural Village. Victoria Park, which includes the main entrance, is patterned after the Victorian era. Boulderville is a small ride area for children which is similar to the fictional town of Bedrock from The Flintstones. Midway Boardwalk is based on 1930s Coney Island and features the most rides. Jungle Outpost is based on the Amazon Jungle in South America, while Spaceport is dedicated to the Space Age. Brooklyn Place is based on 1940s New York and the silent film era as Portabello is based on the Caribbean and West Indies. Eldar's Village is a child-centered area dedicated to the theme park's mascot, Eldar the Wizard, and the twin princesses, Victoria and Madeline. The Cultural Village focuses on the culture and heritage of the Philippines.

In addition, the park's portico, situated beside the entrance, houses the park's guest relation office and dining outlets.

=== Attractions ===
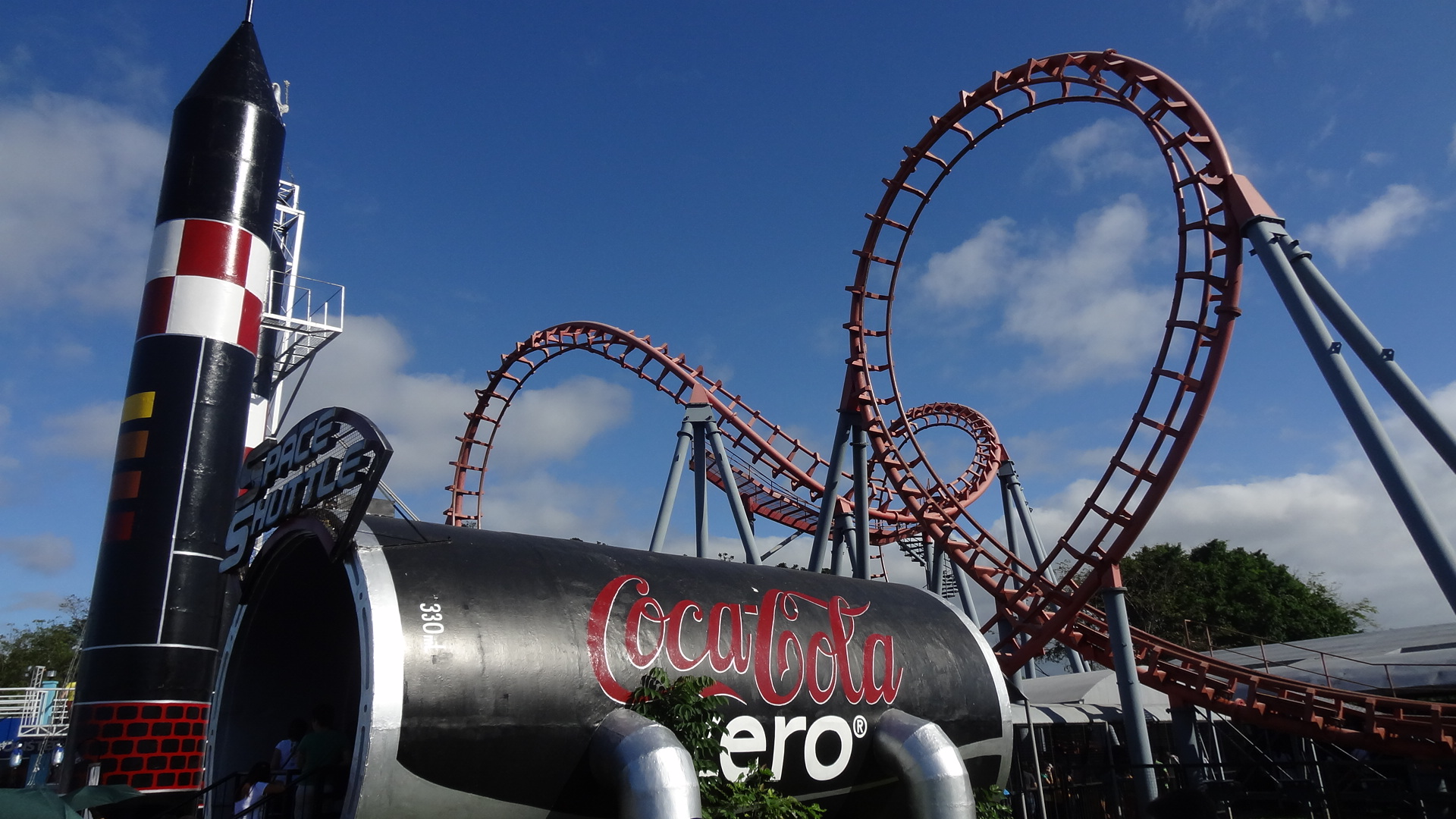
Space Shuttle

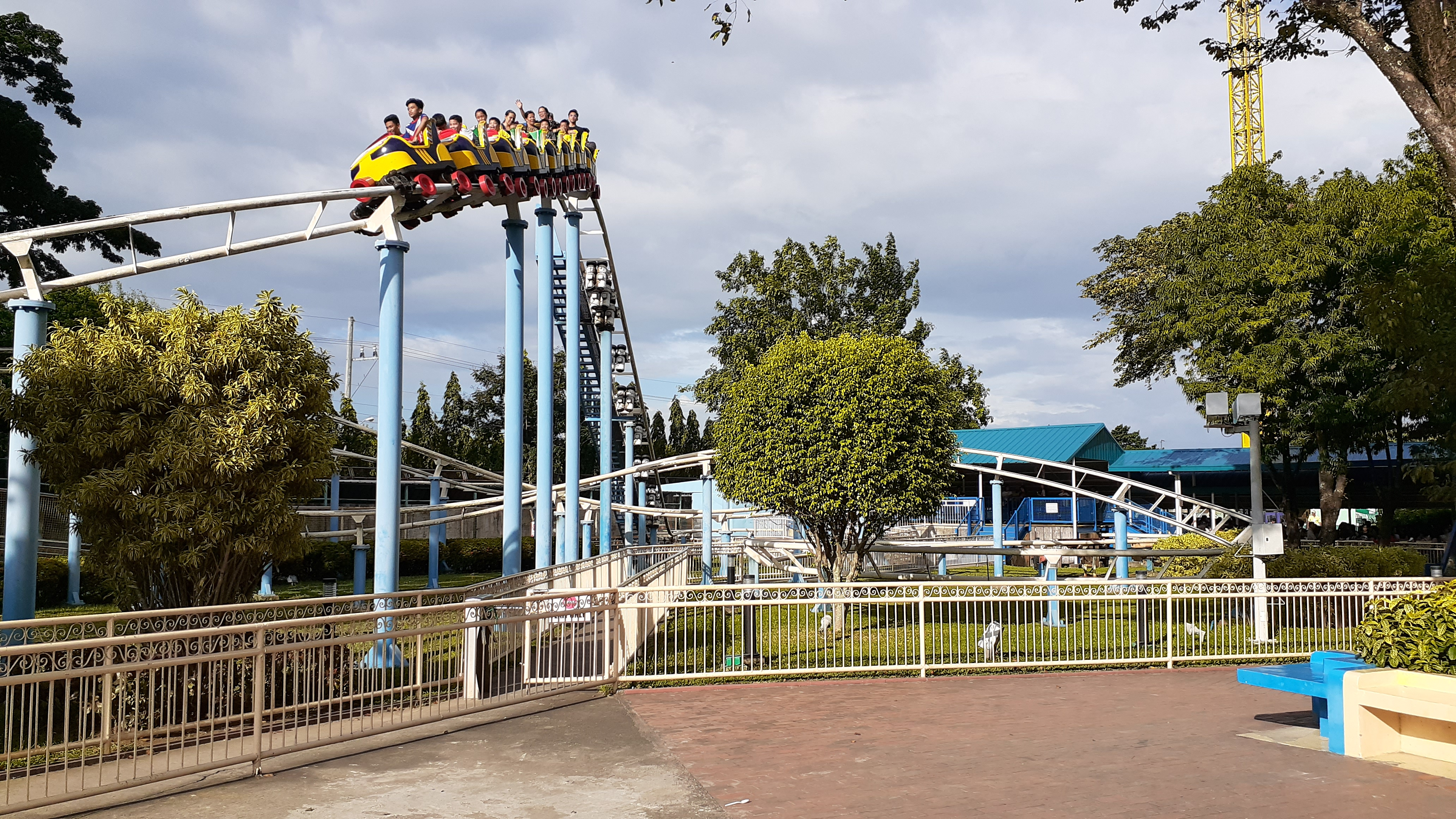
Roller Skater

Roller coasters at Enchanted Kingdom

The Enchanted Kingdom hosts 32 rides and attractions as of 2025. Among the attractions is the Space Shuttle, a roller coaster, and the Wheel of Fate, a 39.62-meter-high (130.0 ft) Ferris wheel with 36 gondolas (each with a 6-person capacity), and the Agila: The EKsperience, a flight motion simulator ride. In addition, the park hosts four event venues. There are rides with unknown names that were removed and replaced by EKstreme Tower and Eldar's Theatre.

== Visitors ==
Enchanted Kingdom experienced financial difficulties in 1997, 2007, and 2008 but since 2009, the park has received a steady increase in regards to its number of visitors. However, in 2013, the park experienced a drop in attendance due to bad weather conditions in the latter half of the year which included Typhoon Haiyan (Yolanda). In 2015, it was reported that 10 percent of the park's visitors were foreigners, mostly Chinese and Koreans. In the same year, 1.8 million people visited the park, registering its largest attendance in its 20-year history.

== Branding ==
Eldar the Wizard, the main mascot of Enchanted Kingdom.

Enchanted Kingdom does not pay royalties to outside sources regarding its characters and attractions, instead coming up with their own characters and other intellectual property. According to company owner, Mario Mamon, the attractions and shows are produced with educational and Filipino values in mind and not solely for entertainment and amusement purposes.

=== Characters ===
The main mascot of the park is Eldar the Wizard, who is designed to embody "knowledge and integrity". He is characterized as a jolly, old wizard from the distant land of Marsynthea. Another character devised by Enchanted Kingdom is Princess Victoria.

== Incidents ==
- October 18, 2006: Two workers fell from the roof of a 50-meter-high (160 ft) structure while repairing a lightning arrester in the afternoon. Both were rushed to the St. James Hospital, also in Santa Rosa, after sustaining injuries from the fall. One of the two workers later died at the hospital. The management of the amusement park clarified that the accident was "not ride-related." The park resumed operations a week later.
- December 12, 2007: Space Shuttle's train stalled on its Cobra Roll element at around 6:00 p.m. PHT. All 25 riders, mostly students on an educational tour, were safely rescued. After that, the attraction was temporarily closed for technical renovation.
