= Charlie Walker (English cricketer) =

English cricketer

Personal information
- Full name: Charles Aubrey Mark Walker
- Born: 21 May 1992 (age 34); Bristol, England
- Height: 6 ft 0 in (1.83 m)
- Batting: Right-handed
- Bowling: Right-arm off break

Domestic team information
- Years: Team
- 2011–present: Oxford MCCU
- 2011–present: Herefordshire

Career statistics
Competition	First-class
Matches	2
Runs scored	69
Batting average	34.50
100s/50s	–/–
Top score	43
Balls bowled	–
Wickets	–
Bowling average	–
5 wickets in innings	–
10 wickets in match	–
Best bowling	–
Catches/stumpings	–/–
- Source: Cricinfo, 22 August 2011

Charles Aubrey Mark Walker (born 21 May 1992) is an English cricketer. Walker is a right-handed batsman who bowls right-arm off break. He was born in Bristol.

While studying for his degree at Oxford Brookes, Walker made his first-class debut for Oxford MCCU against Lancashire in 2011. He made a further first-class appearance for the team in that season, against Sussex. In his matches in 2011, he scored 69 runs at an average of 34.50, with a high score of 43.

During the 2011 season, he also made his Minor counties debut for Herefordshire, making four appearances in the Minor Counties Championship against Shropshire, Hertfordshire, Cornwall and Wales Minor Counties.
