= Charles Rumford Walker (physician) =

American politician and physician

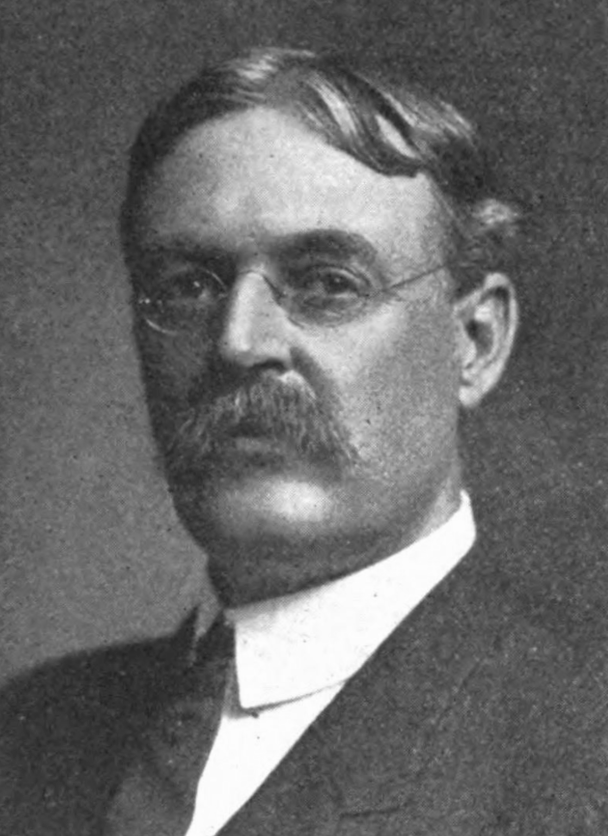
- Born: February 15, 1852; Concord, New Hampshire
- Died: April 22, 1922 (aged 70); Concord, New Hampshire
- Education: Yale University; Harvard Medical School
- Occupation: Politician
- Medical career
- Profession: Doctor

Charles Rumford Walker Sr. (February 13, 1852 – April 22, 1922) was a prominent New Hampshire physician and politician. He was a member of the New Hampshire State Legislature in 1894.

== Biography ==
He was born on February 13, 1852, in Concord, New Hampshire. His grandfather was Nathaniel Gookin Upham, a justice of the New Hampshire Supreme Court.

Walker was educated at Phillips Exeter Academy, Yale University and Harvard Medical School. He was the president of the New Hampshire Medical Society in 1899. He was among the founding physicians of Margaret Pillsbury Hospital in Concord, New Hampshire. A Republican, he was a member of the New Hampshire State Legislature in 1894.

He died in Concord on April 22, 1922.

== See also ==
- Upham-Walker House
