= Nelly de Rooij =

Dutch zoologist and herpetologist

Petronella Johanna Nelly de Rooij
- Born: 30 July 1883; Weesp
- Died: 10 June 1964 (aged 80); Arnhem
- Occupations: Zoologist, herpetologist

Petronella Johanna "Nelly" de Rooij (30 July 1883 – 10 June 1964) was a Dutch zoologist and herpetologist.

== Biography ==
De Rooij was born in Weesp, and she studied medicine in Amsterdam until discrimination against her gender in Dutch law obliged her to continue her studies in Zurich. She studied the cardiovascular system of salamanders of the genus Andrias, and she was awarded her Doctor of Philosophy by the University of Zurich in 1907. With her qualification she was able to return to Amsterdam where she became a curator at the museum of zoology within the University of Amsterdam.

In 1922 she was obliged to leave due to administrative reforms, but in this short academic career she was able to publish The Reptiles of the Indo-Australian Archipelago. The book was based on reptile specimens that were sent to the museum from the Dutch East Indies.

De Rooij died in Arnhem in 1964.

== Legacy ==
De Rooij had two reptile species named after her: Petronella's kukri snake (Oligodon petronellae) by Jean Roux in 1917 and de Rooij's skink (Sphenomorphus derooyae), originally named Lygosoma derooyae by Jan Kornelis de Jong in 1927.

== Taxa described by de Rooij ==
- Calamaria ceramensis, 1913
- Calamaria lautensis, 1917
- Cyrtodactylus malayanus, 1915
- Cyrtodactylus sermowaiensis, 1915
- Draco taeniopterus, 1915
- Eugongylus unilineatus, 1915
- Sphenomorphus longicaudatus, 1915
- Sphenomorphus nigriventris, 1915
- Stegonotus florensis, 1917
- Tribolonotus gracilis, 1909
