= Charles F. Walker =

American historian

Charles "Chuck" Walker is a professor of Latin American history at University of California, Davis. He is formerly the director of its Hemispheric Institute on the Americas and director of Global Centers for Latin America & The Caribbean (Global Affairs). From 2015–2020 he held the MacArthur Foundation Endowed Chair in International Human Rights. His interests include Peru, natural disasters, social movements, subaltern politics, truth commissions, and sports and empire.

== Books ==
In 1999, Walker published Smoldering Ashes: Cuzco and the Transition from Colony to Republic, 1780–1840 (Duke University Press, 1999), which was translated into Spanish as De Túpac Amaru a Gamarra: Cuzco y la creación del Perú republicano (Centro Bartolomé de Las Casas, 3 editions).

In 2008, he published Shaky Colonialism: The 1746 Earthquake-Tsunami in Lima, Peru and its Long Aftermath (Duke University Press 2008), which according to one reviewer is "a brilliant discussion into how natural disasters affect not only the psyche of the inhabitants but also the manner in which social spaces and interactions are rethought with an eye toward achieving social order and control." The book was translated into Spanish as Colonialismo en ruinas: Lima frente al terremoto y tsunami de 1746 (Instituto de Estudios Peruanos & IFEA, 2012; new edition 2024).

In 2014, he published The Tupac Amaru Rebellion (Harvard University Press, 2014), a narrative history of the uprising (1780–83). The Tupac Amaru Rebellion earned the 2015 Norris and Carol Hundley Award, given by the Pacific Coast Branch of the American Historical Association.The Financial Times named it one of the best books of history in 2014. It is now in its fourth edition in Spanish (Instituto de Estudios Peruanos) and will soon appear in Argentina, with PROMETEO publishers.

In September 2020, Oxford University Press published his graphic history, Witness to the Age of Revolution: The Odyssey of Juan Bautista Tupac Amaru (Liz Clarke, artist). It has been translated into Spanish (Penguin) and Quechua (Centro Bartolomé de Las Casas). Also in 2020, he published with Carlos Aguirre a book on the Peruvian socialist thinker Alberto Flores Galindo, Alberto Flores Galindo: Utopía, historia y revolución (La Siniestra Ensayos). A revised translation of this book appeared in December 2024 with BRILL. In 2021, Duke University Press released the translation, with Michael Lazzara, of José Carlos Agüero, Surrendered: Reflections by the Son of Shining Path. The volume contains the translation of the original text as well as an extensive interview conducted by Lazzara and Walker. In 2017, with Carlos Aguirre, he published The Lima Reader: History, Culture, Politics (Duke University Press).

In 2024, he published "Tu ausencia ha sido causa para todo esto". Cartas de Amor y Guerra. Túpac Amaru, Tomasa Tito Condemayta, Micaela Bastidas (Penguin Perú), which he presented at the Arequipa HAY Festival. That same year, he published a series of essays on Cusco, Ensayos Cusqueños: Política, Sociedad y Disidencia desde Túpac Amaru. Cusco, Centro Bartolomé de Las Casas, 2024.

He has also coedited several volumes in Peru, including a collection of his essays, Diálogos con el Perú (FEP San Marcos, 2009). He was co-translator (with Carlos Aguirre and Willie Hiatt) of Alberto Flores Galindo’s Buscando un Inca/In Search of an Inca (Cambridge University Press, 2010). His article, "When Fear Rather than Reason Dominates: Priests Behind the Lines in the Tupac Amaru Rebellion (1780–1783)," won the José María Arguedas Prize from the Peru section in Latin American Studies Association (LASA) 2013.In 2013, he was named Honorary Professor, History Department, Universidad Nacional San Antonio Abad del Cuzco. In fall 2021, he was Visiting Scholar at the Davis Center for Historical Studies. Princeton University. In winter 2026, he will hold the Neilson Visiting Professorship at Smith College.

== Other work ==
Walker served on the Executive Council of the Latin American Studies Association as well as editorial boards in Chile, Peru, Spain, Italy, and the United States. He is the Andes editor for the Oxford Research Encyclopedia of Latin American History. For 2021, he received a Modern Endangered Archives Program Fellowship (UCLA) for the Digitization of the Confederación Campesina del Perú (CCP) Archive. He received a second MEAP fellowship to digitize three major human rights archives in Peru, ANFASEP, EPAF, and APRODEH. The team hope to finish by late 2025. He served as the chief advisor for the exhibit on “Túpac Amaru y Micaela Bastidas: Memorias, símbolos y misterios.” LUM: Lugar de la Memoria, Lima. In recent years, he has served as an expert witness in numerous asylum cases regarding domestic violence and homophobia in Peru.
