= Mark O'Shea (herpetologist) =

English herpetologist, photographer, author, lecturer, and television presenter

Mark O'Shea MBE
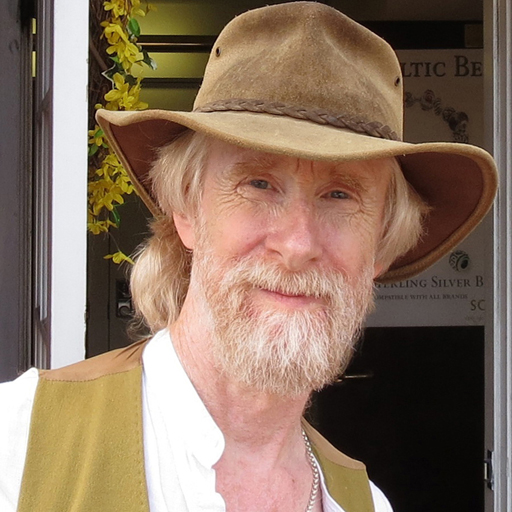
- Mark O'Shea in New England, 2014
- Born: Mark Timothy O'Shea; 9 May 1956 (age 70); Wolverhampton, England
- Education: University of Wolverhampton
- Occupations: Herpetologist, university lecturer, photographer, author, and television presenter
- Employer: University of Wolverhampton
- Website: www.markoshea.info

Mark Timothy O'Shea MBE (born 9 May 1956) is an English herpetologist, photographer, author, lecturer, and television presenter. He presents the Animal Planet/Discovery Channel series O'Shea's Big Adventure.

== Career ==
Originally from Wolverhampton, Mark O'Shea moved to Shropshire in 2001. Since 1980, O'Shea has conducted herpetological fieldwork in over 30 countries on six continents, but he has a special interest in the Australo-Papuan region. He has worked in Papua New Guinea since 1986, when he first visited the country as a member of the scientific directing staff of Operation Raleigh.

He continued fieldwork in the country as a member of the Oxford University Nuffield Department of Clinical Medicine snakebite research team throughout the 1990s, and researched there under the auspices of a fellowship from the Australian Venom Research Unit (AVRU), based in the Department of Pharmacology at the University of Melbourne. In 2006, O'Shea designed a set of six postage stamps called "The Dangerous Snakes of Papua New Guinea" for Post PNG. The launch of these stamps coincided with the snakebite workshops and fieldwork that O'Shea and his colleagues from AVRU were conducting in Papua New Guinea.

O'Shea is also involved in the Tropical Research Initiative at Victor Valley College, initiated and led by Hinrich Kaiser. The primary aim of the project was to conduct the first herpetological survey of Timor-Leste and to provide education and research opportunities for local researchers and students in their native environment. An additional goal was to assist government policy-makers and to educate the citizens of Asia's newest country as they tackle issues related to conservation and sustainability. The research has identified significantly greater amphibian and reptile diversity than previously known.

O'Shea held the position of Curator of Reptiles at the West Midlands Safari Park from 1987 until 2002, when he became Consultant Curator of Reptiles. In 2012, he was bitten by a king cobra while feeding it at the safari park. He had to be treated in hospital after becoming dizzy and unable to speak.

As of September 2025, he is completing a PhD by publication.

=== Television programs ===
==== Giant Snake and Black Mamba ====
In 1997 and 1998, respectively, O'Shea made two films: Giant Snake in Venezuela and Black Mamba in South Africa.

==== O'Shea's Big Adventure ====
O'Shea's Big Adventure, or OBA, known as O'Shea's Dangerous Reptiles on Channel 4 in the UK, chronicles his field excursions to find reptiles around the world. The programs were divided into four series, The Americas, Australasia & Pacific, South & Southeast Asia and Africa & South America. The first two series each contained 13 half-hour films, the latter two each comprised four one-hour films. They were filmed between 1999 and 2003 and have been aired worldwide.

==== Other series ====
Since OBA, he has filmed two episodes of the series Safari Park, charting the day-to-day activities of West Midlands Safari Park and the Ongava Game Reserve, filming in the UK and Namibia, and has presented or appeared on other programs, including a report on the Dangerous Wild Animals Act for the BBC strand Inside Out, filming in the UK and the Netherlands.

=== Radio ===
O'Shea was the featured guest in a September 2025 edition of The Life Scientific.

=== Publications ===
O'Shea has written several books, including The Book of Snakes: A Life-Size Guide to Six Hundred Species from around the World (University of Chicago Press, 2018), A Guide to the Snakes of Papua New Guinea (1996), Dorling Kindersley's Handbook to Reptiles and Amphibians (2001, with Tim Halliday of The Open University), Venomous Snakes of the World (2005), and Boas and Pythons of the World (2007). He has also contributed chapters to books on subjects ranging from rainforest ecology to snakebite, and written popular and scientific articles.

== Honours ==
O'Shea is a Fellow of the Royal Geographical Society and The Explorers Club of New York. In November 2000, he received the Millennium Award for Services to Exploration (Zoology) from the British Chapter of The Explorers Club. The other recipients were Brian Jones (Aerospace), F. Story Musgrave (Artists), Michael Wood (History), Sylvia Earle (Marine Sciences), Sir Chris Bonington (Mountaineering), Buzz Aldrin (Outer Space), and Sir Ranulph Fiennes (Navigation).

He was Chairman of the International Herpetological Society (IHS) from 1983 to 1986 and its president from 2003 to 2006. In July 2010, the IHS awarded O'Shea a life membership and fellowship for his "contributions to the Society and herpetology in general".

In September 2002, O'Shea received an honorary Doctor of Science degree from the University of Wolverhampton, for "services to herpetology".

In September 2018, O'Shea was appointed Professor of Herpetology at the University of Wolverhampton.

O'Shea is a patron of the National Association for Bikers with a Disability and the Small Woods Association.

He was appointed Member of the Order of the British Empire (MBE) in the 2020 Birthday Honours for services to higher education, zoology, reptile conservation, and snakebite research.
