= Exotic Amphibians and Reptiles of the United States =

2022 field guide to American exotic amphibians and reptiles

- Author: Walter E. Meshaka Jr.; Suzanne L. Collins; R. Bruce Bury; Malcolm L. McCallum
- Language: English
- Genre: Nonfiction
- Publisher: University Press of Florida
- Publication date: February 15, 2022
- Publication place: United States
- Pages: 260
- ISBN: 9780813066967

Exotic Amphibians and Reptiles of the United States is a field guide to the exotic amphibians and reptiles established in the continental United States and Hawaii. It is co-authored by herpetologists Walter E. Meshaka Jr., Suzanne L. Collins, R. Bruce Bury, and Malcolm L. McCallum.

== Contents ==
The book provides information about 103 introduced species, with the authors defining an exotic species as any "non-native species whose presence is the result of human-mediated dispersal outside its indigenous geographic range". Within the book's coverage of exotic amphibians and reptiles, 74 of them have their origins outside the continental United States, and 29 species originally belonged to one region but have been introduced to another, now being classified as exotic due to either accidental or deliberate introductions.

The book categorizes species into six divisions by taxonomy: salamanders (3 species), frogs and toads (18 species), turtles (12 species), lizards (62 species), snakes (7 species), and crocodilians (1 species). Each species account comprises a description of the species, encompassing metrics such as size, color, and pattern. It also features one or two color images, a concise introduction history, and a description of the introduced geographic range, including a county-level distribution map updated through 2019. The accounts also provide insights into the species' ecology, covering aspects like habitat, reproduction, diet, predators, and both potential and documented impacts.

== Reception ==
J. Whitfield Gibbons observes that the book holds a wide-ranging appeal, serving as "an essential resource for amateur and professional herpetologists" while also offering valuable insights for individuals intrigued by the histories and biology of exotic amphibians and reptiles. He notes that the book could prove invaluable to land managers, state and federal agencies, conservation organizations, and research ecologists who are eager to gather additional information about the ecological impacts of exotic species on local environments.
