= C. Kenneth Dodd Jr. =

American herpetologist and conservationist

- Education: St. Johns College High School (Washington, D.C.); University of Kentucky; Arizona State University; Clemson University
- Scientific career
- Fields: Herpetology; Conservation Biology
- Workplaces: United States Geological Survey; U.S. Fish and Wildlife Service; University of Florida

C. Kenneth Dodd Jr., is an American conservation biologist, conservationist and herpetologist who specializes in herpetology, the study of amphibians and reptiles. Born 16 November 1949 in San Diego, California, he grew up in northern Virginia and attended St. Johns College High School in Washington, D.C. He later attended the University of Kentucky (BS, 1971) and Arizona State University (MS, 1972) and earned a Ph.D. in zoology under Edmund D. Brodie Jr. from Clemson University in 1974

After a year at Mississippi State University, he joined the U.S. Fish and Wildlife Service’s (FWS) Office of Endangered Species (OES, 1976–1984) where he was responsible for reviewing the status of amphibians and reptiles under the federal Endangered Species Act of 1973. During this time, he prepared the documents leading to the listing of 40 species under the Act’s provisions, including the first Critical Habitats for nesting sea turtles and the first federal protection for a venomous snake. He was further instrumental in promoting habitat acquisition for endangered species, particularly for the St. Croix Ground Lizard (Green Cay National Wildlife Refuge) and Leatherback Sea Turtle (Sandy Point NWR). As one of the earliest staff members of OES and sole herpetologist in the national endangered species program, Dodd played a significant role in establishing OES as a world repository of information on critically endangered species and their conservation. In total, he authored 85 Federal Register documents involving endangered and threatened species. While in the Washington area, Dodd also was a Research Associate at the Department of Vertebrate Zoology, Smithsonian Institution, Washington, D.C., from 1976 to 1984. In late 1984, Dodd transferred to the FWS research division (later in the U.S. Geological Survey) where he conducted research on imperiled federal species, including the Red Hills Salamander, Flattened Musk Turtle (which led to federal protection), Loggerhead Sea Turtle, and Striped Newt. He is also known for his study of temporary ponds in Florida’s sandhills and a long-term study on the biology of Florida Box Turtles at Egmont Key, Florida. He, with Drs. R. Bruce Bury and Gary Fellers in 1980, were the first biologists to suggest that widespread amphibian declines were occurring in the United States. The Sierra Club notes that today, he is a nationally recognized herpetologist.

In recognition of his conservation efforts, Dodd received four Special Achievement Awards and three STAR Awards from the FWS/Department of Interior, twice received the Annual Award for Conservation from the Desert Tortoise Council, the Special Award from the Gopher Tortoise Council, the Paul Moler Award for Herpetological Conservation from the Florida Chapter of The Wildlife Society, and the Peter C.H. Pritchard Turtle Conservation Lifetime Achievement Award from Turtle Survival Alliance/International Union for the Conservation of Nature’s (IUCN) Tortoise and Freshwater Turtle Specialist Group/The Turtle Conservancy.

In addition to research, Dodd volunteered as a Courtesy Associate Curator in the Florida Museum of Natural History (2019-2023) and as an Associate Professor (Courtesy) in the Department of Wildlife Ecology and Conservation at the University of Florida (1986-2018). As a member of the Graduate Faculty, he served as chair of three Ph.D. committees and eight Master’s committees and as a committee member of many other graduate students at UF and elsewhere.

Dodd is professionally best known for his books on natural history, sampling and monitoring herpetofauna, and amphibian conservation:

2001. North American Box Turtles. A Natural History. University of Oklahoma Press, Norman. 231 pp. [soft cover edition issued in 2002; reissued 2023] [ISBN 978-0-8061-3501-4]

2004. The Amphibians of Great Smoky Mountains National Park. University of Tennessee Press, Knoxville. 283 pp. [ISBN 11572332751 ]

2010. Amphibian Ecology and Conservation. A Handbook of Techniques. Oxford University Press, Oxford, UK. 556 pp. [ISBN 978-0-19-103738-2]

2013. Frogs of the United States and Canada. Johns Hopkins University Press, Baltimore. 2 Volumes, i-xxvii + 962 pp. Awarded in 2014: Outstanding Book Published (The Wildlife Society); Outstanding Reference Source (American Library Association); Outstanding Academic Title (Choice Magazine) [ISBN 978-1-4214-0633-6]

2016. Reptile Ecology and Conservation, A Handbook of Techniques. Oxford University Press, Oxford, UK. 462 pp. [ISBN 978-0-19-872614-2]

2023. Frogs of the United States and Canada. Second edition. Johns Hopkins University Press, Baltimore, Maryland. xxxiv + 954 pp. [ISBN 978-1-4214-4491-8]

2025. Status of Conservation and Decline of Amphibians in Canada and the United States. Amphibian Biology, Volume 9, Part 7. Edition Chimaira, Frankfurt am Main, Germany. [with Harold Heatwole and Susan King] [in press]

== Honors and awards ==
- 1980, 1985, Special Achievement Award
- 1987, 1992, U.S. Fish and Wildlife Service
- 1985 Annual Award for Conservation. Desert Tortoise Council
- 1986 Quality Performance Award. U.S. Fish and Wildlife Service
- 1990 Co-Chairman's Special Award. Gopher Tortoise Council
- 1998 U.S. Department of Interior STAR Award
- 2003 U.S. Department of Interior STAR Award
- 2004 U.S. Department of Interior STAR Award
- 2009 Annual Award for Conservation. Desert Tortoise Council

== Board memberships ==
- Vice-president, The Herpetologists’ League (2000-2001)
- President, The Herpetologists’ League (2002-2003)
- Past-President (Member of Board of Trustees), The Herpetologists’ League (2004-2009)
- Editorial board, Herpetologica (2004–Present)
- Best Student Paper Committee, HL (1988)
- Resolutions Committee, HL (1990-1994; Chair, 1993-4)
- Board of Governors, ASIH (1990-1995)
- Secretary-Treasurer, Southeast Div., ASIH (1990-1991)
- Vice president, Southeast Div., ASIH (1991-1992)
- President, Southeast Div., ASIH (1992-1993)
- Editorial Policy Committee, ASIH (2005-2010)
- Stoye Award Committee, ASIH (1991)
- Committee on Environmental Quality, ASIH (1978-1991, 1993-1997)
- Editorial board, Copeia (1997-2002)
- Board of Councilors, ISSCA (1996-2005)
- President, ISSCA (2003-2005)
- Editorial board, Alytes
- Board of directors, SSAR (1998-2000)
- Editorial board, Journal of Herpetology (1993-1994)
- Associate editor, Journal of Herpetology (1995-2003)
- Committee on Grants in Herpetology, SSAR (1978-1979, 1986)
- SSAR Conservation Committee (1979-1998; Chair 1994-1998)
- Seibert Prize Award Committee, SSAR (1992)
- Editorial board, Chelonian Conservation and Biology (1993-2011)
- Editorial board, Herpetological Conservation and Biology (2006–Present)
- Editorial Review Board, Amphibian & Reptile Conservation
- Editorial board, Applied Herpetology (2002-2009)
- Board of Governors, Annual Symposium on Sea Turtle Biology and Conservation (1993-1998)
- Best Student Paper Committee, Annual Symposium on Sea Turtle Biology and Conservation (2000, Chair: 1993-1995)
- Student Travel Award Committee, Annual Symposium on Sea Turtle Biology and Conservation (Chair: 1993-1997)
- Nominating Committee, Annual Symposium on Sea Turtle Biology and Conservation (1994)
- Scientific Committee, World Conference on Sea Turtle Conservation, 1979, Washington, D.C.
- Technical Advisory Committee, Western Atlantic Turtle Symposium, 1983, San Jose, Costa Rica.
- Consultant, Wider Caribbean Sea Turtle Recovery and Conservation Network (1984-1985).
- Convenor, Roundtable on Conservation Problems, First World Congress of Herpetology, 1989, Kent, England.
- Scientific Commission, International Congress of Chelonian Conservation, Gonfaron, France, 1995
- Executive Council, World Congress of Herpetology (2005-2012)
- Audit Committee, World Congress of Herpetology (2006–Present)
- IUCN Freshwater Turtle and Tortoise Specialist Group (Full member)
- IUCN Crocodile Specialist Group (Corresponding member, 1983-1989; Full member, 1989-1997)
- IUCN Marine Turtle Specialist Group (Full member)
- IUCN/SSC Declining Amphibians Populations Task Force (Chair, Southeastern U.S. section, 1992-2000)

== Rattlesnake Controversy ==
In the fall of 1979, Dodd was involved in a controversy involving Pennsylvania Pennsylvania timber rattler, a state protected species. Knowing that Pennsylvania protected the species and that a local restaurant (Dominique’s in Washington, D.C.) had been featured selling rattlesnake steaks, Dodd wrote a letter to the owner of the restaurant, Dominique d’Ermo, requesting that the restaurant find another source for its exotic delicacy. Noting that moving a state-protected wildlife species across state lines, without permission, was a violation of the federal Lacey Act, the restaurant was in violation of both state and federal law. The letter was simply a reminder, and no legal procedures were involved. Mr. d’Ermo readily agreed and so the matter was thought to end. The next day, however, a note the Washington Star’s gossip column (“The Ear”) mentioned Dodd’s letter. Unbeknownst to Dodd, Dominique’s owner was friends with then-Secretary of the Department of the Interior Cecil D. Andrus, who was outraged that one of his employees had contacted Mr. d’Ermo concerning the infraction. Andrus ordered Dodd to be fired, and over the next several weeks, conservation organizations, the media (e.g., editorials in the Washington Post {17 October}, Washington Star {13 October}, Los Angeles Times {17 October}), and Congressmen expressed outrage over the retaliatory way Dr. Dodd was treated. After warnings of legal action and Congressional hearings, Dodd was reinstated with no mention of the incident on his personnel record. Dodd retired from federal service as a GS-15 Research Zoologist in February 2007. Dominique’s restaurant closed in 1994.
