= Malcolm L. McCallum =

American herpetologist

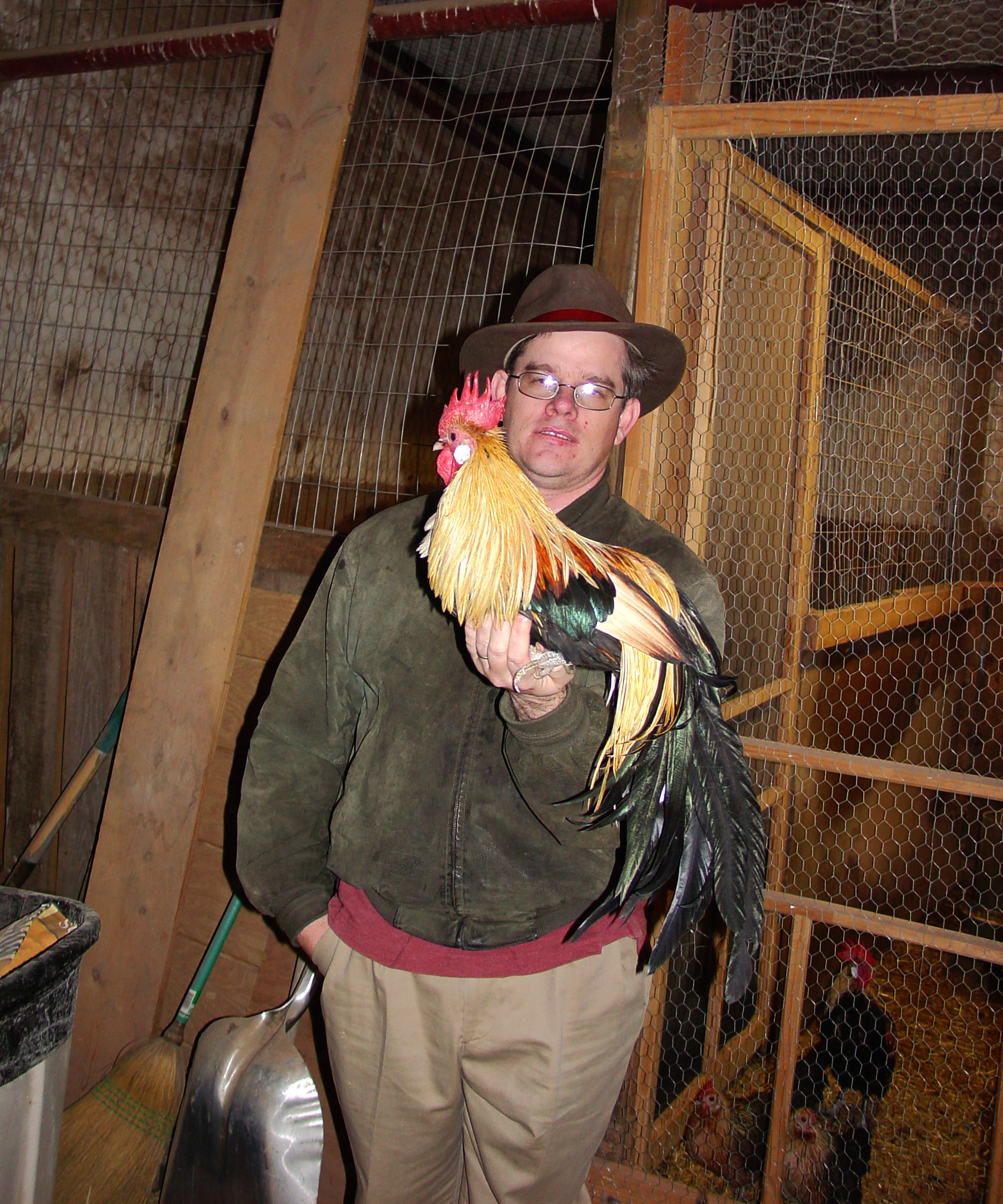
- Malcolm McCallum at his home in Texarkana circa 2008 with a bantam golden phoenix rooster
- Born: December 26, 1968 (age 57); Maywood, Illinois
- Education: Arkansas State University; Eastern Illinois University; Illinois State University
- Scientific career
- Fields: Environmental Sciences
- Workplaces: Langston University

Malcolm L. McCallum (born December 26, 1968) is an American environmental scientist, conservationist, herpetologist, and natural historian and is known for his work on the Holocene Extinction. He is also a co-founder of the herpetology journal, Herpetological Conservation and Biology. He is a key figure in amphibian biology and his research has produced numerous landmark studies. His work has been covered by David Attenborough, Discover Magazine, and other media outlets.

== Education, research, teaching and service ==
McCallum was born in Maywood, Illinois. He earned his BS with a double major in agriculture and biology from Illinois State University,. He earned a MS in Environmental Biology from Eastern Illinois University and the PhD degree in Environmental Science from Arkansas State University, specializing in ecotoxicology and conservation ecology. He has been ranked among the 150 most influential environmental scientists and in the top 200 American zoologists.

In 1997 his discovery of deformed frogs in Madison County, Illinois received media coverage in St. Louis news outlets. He then worked at the St. Louis Children's Aquarium as the institution's grant writer, and designed educational programs, conducted research on the use of bovine somatotropin (bST) applications in aquaculture, and delivered tours and extension programming until he left to pursue his PhD in 1999. He also organized and edited the First International Symposium on the conservation and sustainability of the ornamental fish industry on Rio Negro River, Manaus. He participated in several areas of research that later were published by the aquarium from 1999 to 2001. Stanley E. Trauth was his doctoral mentor.

Many of his early papers were focused on natural history, but they also cover amphibian conservation, ecological immunology, and general biology. He is widely published on the life history and conservation of Blanchard's cricket frog (Acris blanchardi ) with papers on its systematics, immunology, behavior, life history, and conservation needs. He continued this research as an assistant professor at Louisiana State University at Shreveport from 2003 to 2005.

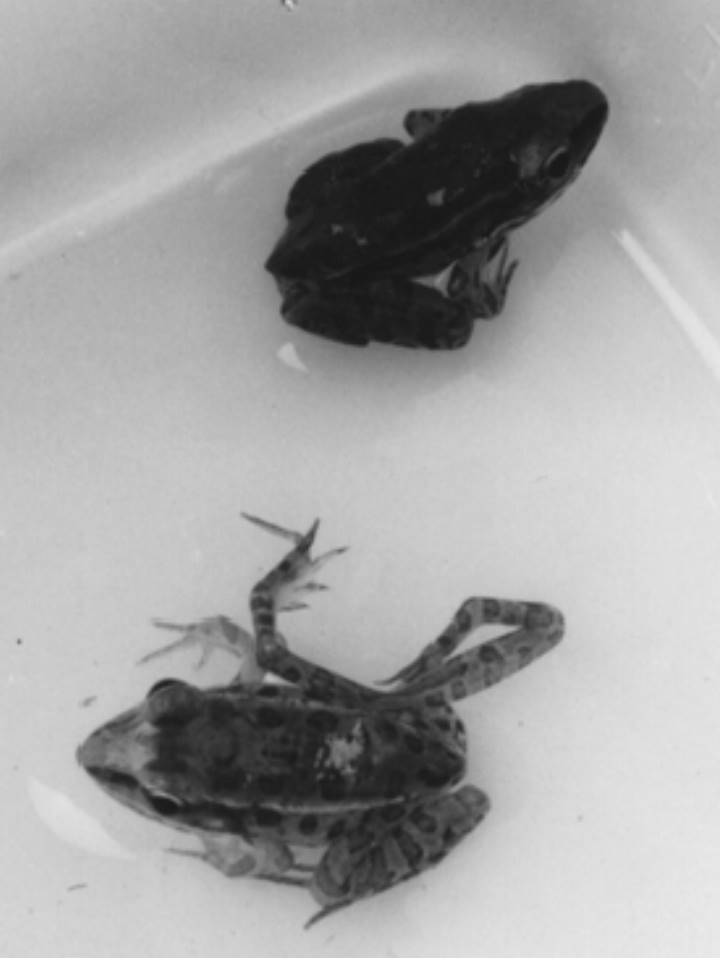
Southern Leopard Frogs with abnormal limbs of unknown causation (c. 1997)

In 2006 McCallum and several other scientists established the journal Herpetological Conservation and Biology.

Malcolm L. McCallum teaching field biology on the Caddo River, Arkansas in 2005

He moved to Texas A&M University Texarkana in 2005. Here, he developed a novel teaching method for classroom discussions. "The result of this model was not only to circumvent many lazy student behaviors, but also to improve reading comprehension by familiarizing students with how to read, process, and evaluate complex scientific manuscripts in a short period of time." Hedwig Pöllöläinen.

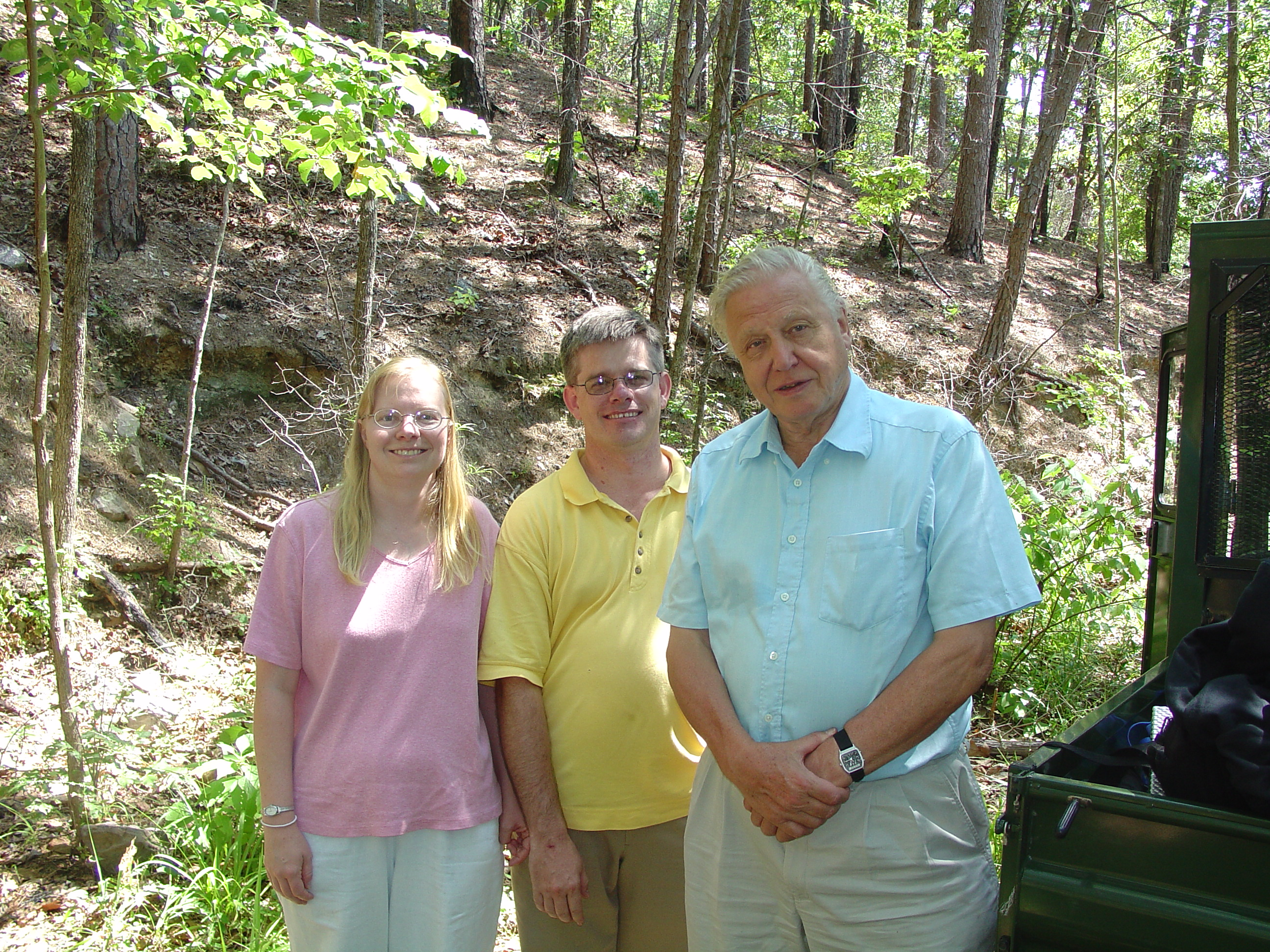
Jamie and Malcolm McCallum with David Attenborough on the set of Life in Cold Blood in the Ouachita Mountains in Arkansas.

McCallum used fuzzy logic in his paper, Amphibian decline or extinction? Current losses dwarf background extinction rates, to compare recent extinction rates of amphibians to their rates at the k-Pg boundary. His calculations demonstrated that the losses in amphibian biodiversity in recent times represented one of the most rapid losses in biodiversity ever observed. In 2008 the study was listed by Discover Magazine as #4 among ten "landmark papers" on the topic of amphibian extinctions and declines. His use of fuzzy approaches was extended to two studies addressing climate change impacts on herpetofauna. His 2015 paper argued that species losses of vertebrate animals since 1980 have been faster that the Cretaceous–Paleogene extinction event that wiped out dinosaurs 65 million years ago, suggesting we are in a 6th mass extinction.

In 2014 he conducted a study using Google Trends to data mine Google search data to infer public interest on the environment, and concluded that interest in the environment had fallen since 2004. In 2019, he compared Google searches before and after release of the landmark encyclical, Laudato Si', revealing that interest in the environment rose markedly in most countries around the world.

== Selected bibliography ==
McCallum is the author of over 100 publications.

- Meshaka, Walter E. Jr., Suzanne L. Collins, R. Bruce Bury, Malcolm L. McCallum (2022) Exotic Amphibians and Reptiles of the United States. University Press of Florida.
- McCallum, M.L. (2021) Turtle biodiversity losses suggest coming sixth mass extinction. Biodiversity and Conservation 30: 1257–1275
- McCallum, M.L. (2019) Perspective: Global country-by-country response of public interest in the environment to the papal encyclical, Laudato Si′. Biological Conservation 235:209-225.
- McCallum, M.L. (2015) Vertebrate biodiversity losses point to sixth mass extinction. Biodiversity and Conservation 24:2497-.2519.
- McCallum, M.L. and G.W. Bury (2014). Public interest in the environment is falling: A Response to Ficetola (2013). Biodiversity and Conservation 23:1057-1362.
- McCallum, M.L. and J.L. McCallum. (2014). Ecological Release of an exotic species upon removal of an invasive predator. Journal of North American Herpetology 2014:21 – 27.
- McCallum, M.L., M. Matlock, J. Treas, B. Safi, W. Sanson, J.L. McCallum. (2013). Endocrine disruption of sexual selection by an estrogenic herbicide in Tenebrio molitor. Ecotoxicology 22:1461-1466.
- McCallum, M.L., and G.W. Bury. (2013). Google search patterns suggest declining interest in conservation and environment. Biodiversity and Conservation 22:1355 – 1367.
