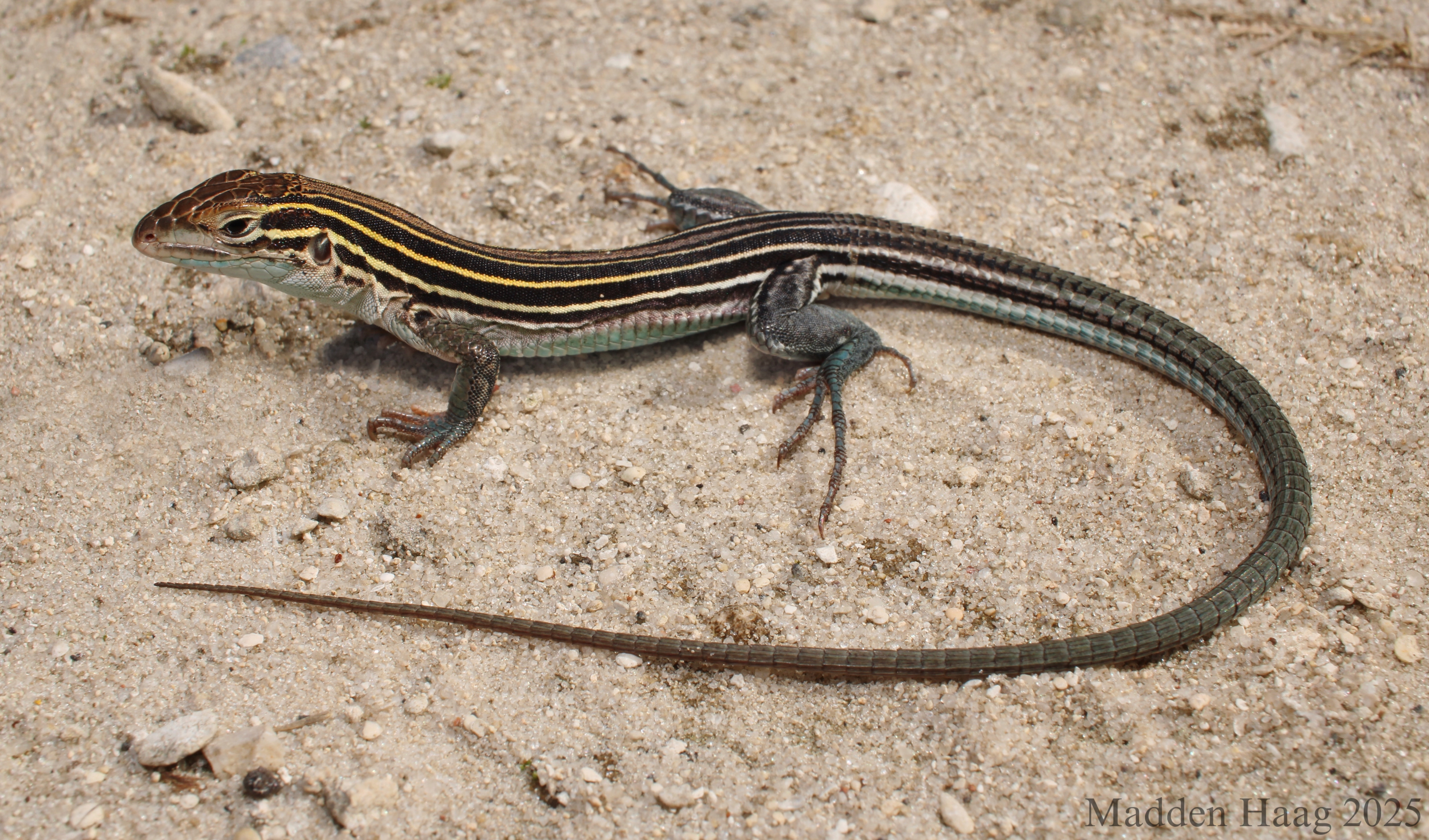
- Six-lined racerunner (Aspidoscelis sexlineatus)

Conservation status
- Least Concern (IUCN 3.1)

Scientific classification
- Kingdom: Animalia
- Phylum: Chordata
- Class: Reptilia
- Order: Squamata
- Family: Teiidae
- Genus: Aspidoscelis
- Species: A. sexlineatus

Binomial name
- Aspidoscelis sexlineatus (Linnaeus, 1766)

Synonyms
- Lacerta sexlineata Linnaeus, 1766; Cnemidophorus sexlineatus — A.M.C. Duméril & Bibron, 1839; Aspidoscelis sexlineata — Reeder et al., 2002

= Six-lined racerunner =

Species of lizard

The six-lined racerunner (Aspidoscelis sexlineatus) is a species of lizard native to the United States and Mexico.

== Geographic range ==
The six-lined racerunner is found throughout much of the southeastern and south-central portion of the United States, from Maryland to Florida in the east, across the Great Plains to South Texas and northern Mexico. In a study conducted on A. sexlineata in Mexico, the majority of the individuals found were inhabiting areas near the seashore that were formed and influenced from maritime climate and hurricanes. The species' range also reaches north to Wisconsin and Minnesota. A small disjunct population is found in Tuscola County, Michigan.

== Description ==
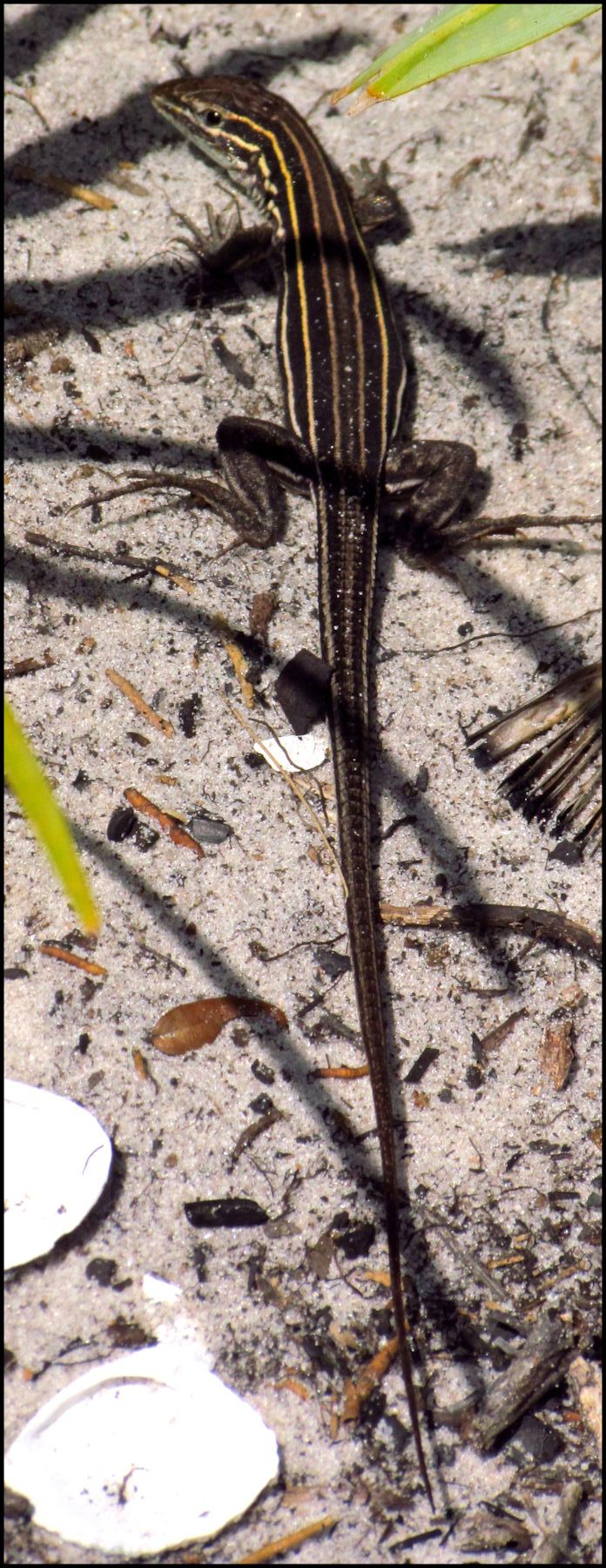
Adult, Indialantic, Florida

The six-lined racerunner is typically dark green, brown, or black in color, with six yellow or green-yellow stripes that extend down the body from head to tail. Between the stripes are dark-colored fields ranging from dark brown to black and pale-colored fields near ventral scales on each side. A distinct lemon-yellow coloration is on the sides of the head both above and below the lateral stripe. Also, white mental and gular stripes occur. The posterior gular fold is bordered by enlarged mesoptychial scales. The postantebrachial scales on the forearms are granular-like and only slightly enlarged. The underside is usually white in color on females, but they may have some pale blue as adults. Males have a brightly blue-hued chest and abdominal stripes. Males also sometimes have a pale green-colored throat. They are slender-bodied, with a tail nearly twice the body length. Its long tail may serve as a counterbalance, allowing it to turn to flee quickly from predators.

== Behavior ==
Like other species of whiptail lizards, the six-lined racerunner is diurnal and insectivorous. A. sexlineata is most active between 9:00 and 11:30 am on clear days between late spring and early summer when the temperature is closest to 90 °F. A different study found six-lined racerunners were most active between 11:00 am and 3:00 pm. They are wary, energetic, and fast moving, with speeds up to 18 mph (29 kmh), darting for cover if approached. The farther away they are from shelter, the faster they will flee. In addition, a "pecking order" exists within populations. Aggressive behavior is common, as the dominant chases the subordinate and often follows up with a bite to signify dominance.

== Habitat ==
Due to its extensive range, A. sexlineata is found in a wide variety of habitats, including grasslands, woodlands, open floodplains, or rocky outcroppings. Populations have also been found abundantly in areas that experience frequent fires, such as longleaf pine stands in the sandhills. In fact, both prescribed burns and natural fires have been reported to increase the genetic diversity within populations. It prefers lower elevations, with dry loamy soils as well as open xeric environments. In the lower elevations, the six-lined racerunner can be found in human-made disturbances like under voltage towers or along highways and railroads. They lay their nests around activity burrows along secondary highways and dirt roads where it is well drained. In preparation for winter dormancy, A. sexlineata creates hibernation burrows that are deeper and are constructed in hard-packed soil unlike their activity burrows.

== Reproduction ==
Breeding takes place in the spring and early summer, with up to six eggs being laid in midsummer and hatching six to eight weeks later. A second clutch of eggs may be laid several weeks after the first. Males have been seen to perform an act termed "cloacal rubbing" to show arousal during breeding. This act entails the male rubbing his cloaca and pelvic region rapidly on the ground, sometimes in a figure eight, while simultaneously moving forward. When he finds a receptive female, the male straddles her, curves his body over hers, and bites her on the opposite side to where his cloacal region is to start copulation. Males also perform an act termed "female tending" where they repeatedly charge at a female trying to leave her burrow until the female allows the male to approach and begin the reproductive process.

== Prey and Predators ==
A. sexlineata is an opportunistic insectivore; it targets a prey abundant in its area. The principal foods of A. sexlineata are spiders (Araneae 16.8%), grasshoppers (Orthoptera 16.8%), and leaf hoppers (Homoptera 14.1%). A. sexlineata also prey upon beetles and butterflies.

Red imported fire ants are a predator of the six-lined racerunner.

== Subspecies ==
Three subspecies of A. sexlineatus are recognized:

- Eastern six-lined racerunner, A. s. sexlineatus (Linnaeus, 1766)
- Texas yellow-headed racerunner, A. s. stephensae Trauth, 1992
- Prairie racerunner, A. s. viridis Lowe, 1966

== Conservation status ==
The six-lined racerunner is listed as a species of concern in the states of Michigan and Wisconsin, due to its limited population, but otherwise holds no official conservation status. In Michigan, the population is found in a single public game reserve, 322 km separated from the closest known other populations in Indiana. This species has been observed to benefit from human development in some locations, with stable populations existing along road cuts and railroad tracks. Bagdad, Tamaulipas in Mexico has seen a large decrease in six-lined racerunner populations due to recreational vehicle damage to sand dunes.
