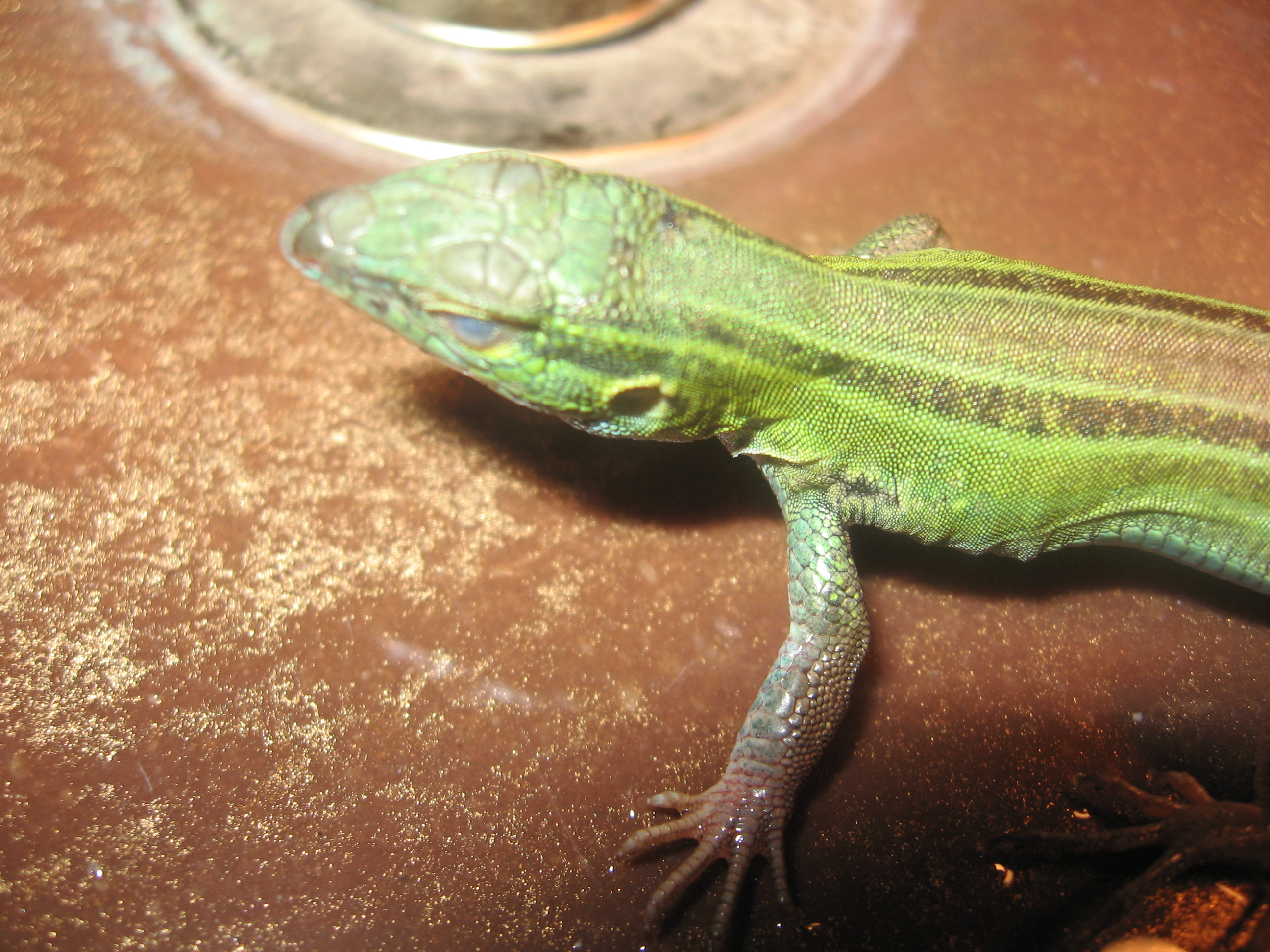

Scientific classification
- Domain: Eukaryota
- Kingdom: Animalia
- Phylum: Chordata
- Class: Reptilia
- Order: Squamata
- Family: Teiidae
- Genus: Cnemidophorus
- Species: C. sexlineatus
- Subspecies: C. s. viridis

Trinomial name
- Cnemidophorus sexlineatus viridis Lowe, 1966

Synonyms
- Aspidoscelis sexlineata viridis – Reeder et al., 2002

= Cnemidophorus sexlineatus viridis =

Subspecies of lizard

Cnemidophorus sexlineatus viridis, commonly known as the prairie racerunner, is a subspecies of lizard endemic to the United States. It is a subspecies of Cnemidophorus sexlineatus, which is commonly known as the six-lined racerunner lizard.

== Geographic range ==
C. s. viridis is found throughout the short grass prairie habitat of the midwestern United States, from Colorado to Nebraska, south to northern Texas. Southern New Jersey.

== Description ==
The prairie racerunner is generally dark green or dark brown in color, with seven yellow stripes which run the length of the body from the head to the tail, and has a white underside. They are slender-bodied, and have a tail that is nearly twice the length of their body.

== Behavior ==
Like most species of whiptail lizard, the prairie racerunner is diurnal and insectivorous. They are most active in the early morning, and hide as the heat of the day rises.
