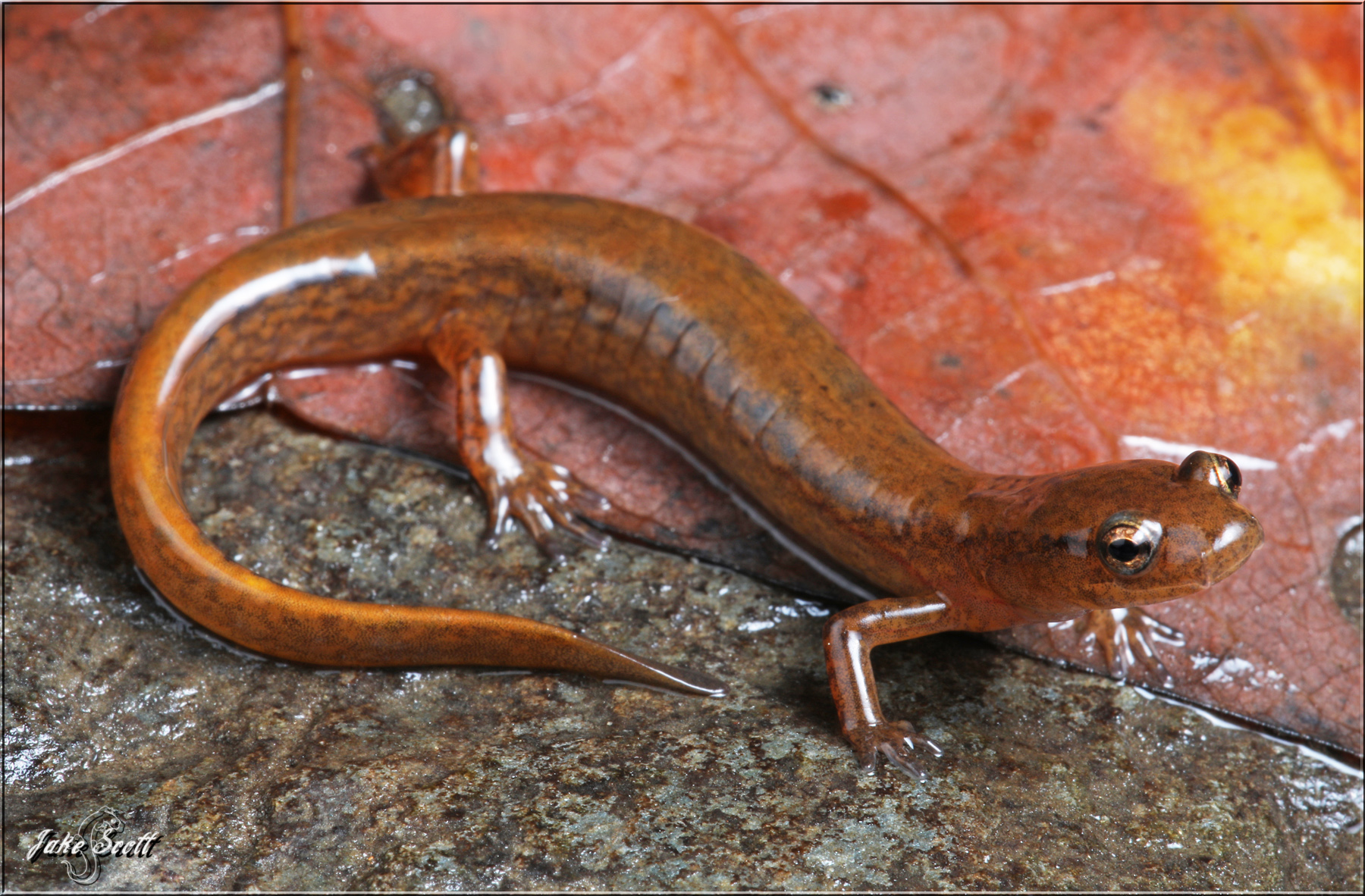

Conservation status
- Vulnerable (IUCN 3.1)

- Imperiled (NatureServe)

Scientific classification
- Kingdom: Animalia
- Phylum: Chordata
- Class: Amphibia
- Order: Urodela
- Family: Plethodontidae
- Genus: Eurycea
- Species: E. junaluska

Binomial name
- Eurycea junaluska Sever, Dundee & Sullivan, 1976

= Junaluska salamander =

Species of amphibian

The Junaluska salamander (Eurycea junaluska) is a species of lungless salamander native to the south-eastern United States. It was first described by David M. Sever, Harold M. Dundee, and Charles D. Sullivan who found the species in the range from the Cheoah River, Santeetlah Creek, and Tululah Creek in Graham County of North Carolina. Adults of this species can be found near large, rocky streams and on rainy nights on roads in the areas specified. The salamander is characterized by brownish-yellow coloration with a series of small dots along the body and a robust build compared to the other salamanders in Eurycea. The Junaluska salamander's breeding habits tend to be in large streams where the eggs are laid and attached to the bottom of rocks in the streams where they are found. According to the overall conservation listing for IUCN, this species is listed as Vulnerable. Conservation acts are important in both North Carolina and Eastern Tennessee, since the population of this species in each state is so small.

== Identification ==
Eurycea junaluska has a brownish dorsum with small dots or wavy lines along the body. An easy way to distinguish E. junaluska from E. bislineata is E. junaluska has a more robust body, longer forelimbs, and a shorter tail. Also, Sever and his colleagues studied the teeth series and discovered E. junaluska possesses a longer prevomerine teeth series. In addition to these traits, a wavy, broken, black stripe up to 0.80mm wide extends from the nostril through the eye and through the sides of the body and tail. The front limbs contain four toes and the back limbs contain five toes. Nasolabial grooves are present and the number of coastal grooves usually ranges from 13 to 15.

No phylogenetic trees are available for this species to date. The specific name Junaluska was chosen to honor a Cherokee chief who was prominent in North Carolina's history, Junaluska. The area Chief Junaluska was given contains a good amount of the range of where the species exists in North Carolina, which is the reason for the naming of the salamander.

== Geographic distribution ==
Junaluska salamanders have only been found in the Blue Ridge Mountain area in the Cheoah River, Santeetlah Creek, and Tululah Creek in Graham County of North Carolina. They are also found in a limited number of creeks in the Great Smoky Mountains National Park, Sevier County, Tennessee. These salamanders are very rarely encountered in either area. One looking for this species is more likely to find E. junaluska in larger rocky streams in colder weather. Another popular way of spotting this species is late-night driving along roads on rainy nights. They can be seen moving between the terrestrial habitat they inhabit and the areas where they breed.

== Ecology ==
Larvae are not numerous in larger streams, possibly because of the abundance of trout; predation by trout and other species of fish can affect the populations of E. junaluska. Competition with other salamanders can also be a factor. The Junaluska salamander is thought to feed on smaller invertebrates found in the stream and forest areas they inhabit. Currently, interactions with other species are not well studied for this species.

== Life events ==
The larval life history of E. junaluska is still not very well known. Studies have found the breeding season is spread from fall to early spring. The larval period reportedly lasts around two to three years, and metamorphosis occurs during the summer months. Eggs are laid in the streams and are attached under media such as large rocks. The depth of the eggs laid range from 6–20 cm. The adult salamanders stay around where the eggs are laid to protect the egg clutch. Clutch sizes range from 30 to 50 eggs. The larvae are completely aquatic until they metamorphose into adults. The larvae can easily be distinguished as other Eurycea species, so it is important to distinguish them correctly. A successful method of discovering the larvae is by using leaf mats placed in the streams underneath or near rocks. This allowed surveyors to receive data on the egg clutches and adult salamanders.

== Conservation ==
According to the IUCN, the species is declared vulnerable overall. The main conservation threat to the Junaluska salamanders are human disturbances, such as logging, road construction, and development in urban areas. These disturbances affect the water quality and therefore affect the small populations of this rare species. The disruption of the breeding sites of the Junaluska can interrupt the breeding time between fall and early spring that could be detrimental to the larval population. North Carolina and Tennessee have different listings for this species in respect to the conservation concerns for the species. In North Carolina, E. junaluska is said to be state threatened and a federal species of special concern. In Tennessee, the species is listed as imperiled and deemed in need of management. Conservation efforts are important for this species, since it is endemic to the United States, particularly in North Carolina and Tennessee. As of 2011, the population is said to be less than 1,000 individuals overall.
