= Stanley E. Trauth =

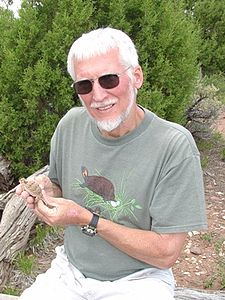
- Stan Trauth in Utah holding a horned lizard (Phrynosoma sp.)
- Born: September 5, 1948 (age 77); St. Louis, Missouri
- Education: University of Arkansas; Auburn University
- Spouse: Joy Trauth
- Scientific career
- Fields: Biology
- Workplaces: Arkansas State University

Stanley E. Trauth is an American herpetologist and professor of zoology and environmental studies at Arkansas State University. He is also the curator of the herpetological collection of the Arkansas State University Museum of Zoology.

== Early life and education ==
Trauth was born September 5, 1948, in St. Louis, Missouri, but moved to Arkansas as a child in 1955. Trauth attended Mountain Home High School in Mountain Home, Arkansas, where he played quarterback on the football team and played basketball. He earned his BS (1970) and MS (1974) in zoology from the University of Arkansas, Fayetteville, where he worked on collared lizards (Crotaphytus collaris) under James M. Walker. He earned his PhD from Auburn University (1980), where he worked on six-lined racerunners (Aspidoscelis sexlineatus) under Robert Mount (who graduated under Archie Carr).

== Research ==
Trauth's research concerns conservation, microscopic anatomy, histology, reproductive biology parasitology, natural history, and behavior of amphibians and reptiles.

== Conservation ==
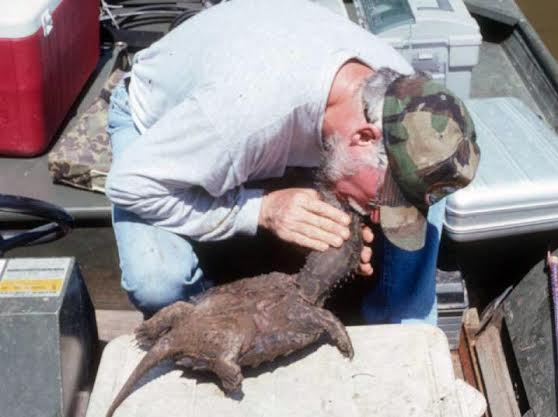
Stan Trauth provides mouth-to-nose resuscitation to an alligator snapping turtle (Macrochelys temminickii).

Trauth's work with his student Benjamin A. Wheeler and University of Florida professor Max Nickerson, on the federally endangered Ozark hellbender (Cryptobranchus alleganiensis) was important in its obtaining protection under the U.S. Endangered Species Act of 1972. Trauth has surveyed populations of this species in Arkansas and Missouri. His studied the alligator snapping turtle (Macrochelys temminickii) for over 20 years. He led captive rearing programs for these species with the U.S. Fish and Wildlife Service's Mammoth Spring Fish Hatchery and the Arkansas State fish Hatchery in Mammoth Spring, Arkansas. Trauth led the first inventories of amphibians and reptiles of the Arkansas Post National Memorial, George Washington Carver National Memorial, Wilson's Creek National Battlefield, and Ozark National Scenic Waterways for the National Park Service and United States Geological Survey. Inventory work such as these provide the baseline population and community information on which to base future management decisions. His study on fire ant predation of lizard eggs was among the first. His work with Joseph Milanovich (Loyola University [Chicago]), David Saugey (US Forest Service) and Robyn Jordan demonstrated that climate change could have severe impacts on terrestrial populations. His work with Dr. Joy Trauth and Malcolm L. McCallum showed that Illinois chorus frogs (Pseudacris illinoesis) were experiencing a severe range contraction, largely due to changed land use policies connected to US Environmental Protection Agency's Best Management Practices for controlling runoff on farm fields in Arkansas.

== Microscopic anatomy, histology and reproductive biology ==
Trauth is the director of the Arkansas State University Electron Microscopy Facility, although his work in these areas includes other techniques (such as light, fluorescence, scanning electron, and transmission electron microscopy). He has studied spermatogenesis and spermatogenic cycles in amphibians and reptiles, and his work on sperm morphology and glandular epithelium includes the first descriptions for many species. Much understanding of the reproductive biology of amphibians and reptiles in Arkansas comes from Trauth's work.

== Parasitology ==
Trauth has a long on-going collaboration with Christopher T. McAllister investigating the parasites of amphibians and reptiles. Together, they have published at least 40 articles on helminths, coccidea, and other parasitic organisms, including descriptions of at least eight species new to science. The species Eimeria trauthi, a species of coccidia found in marbled salamanders (Ambystoma opacum) was named in his honor.

== Behavior ==
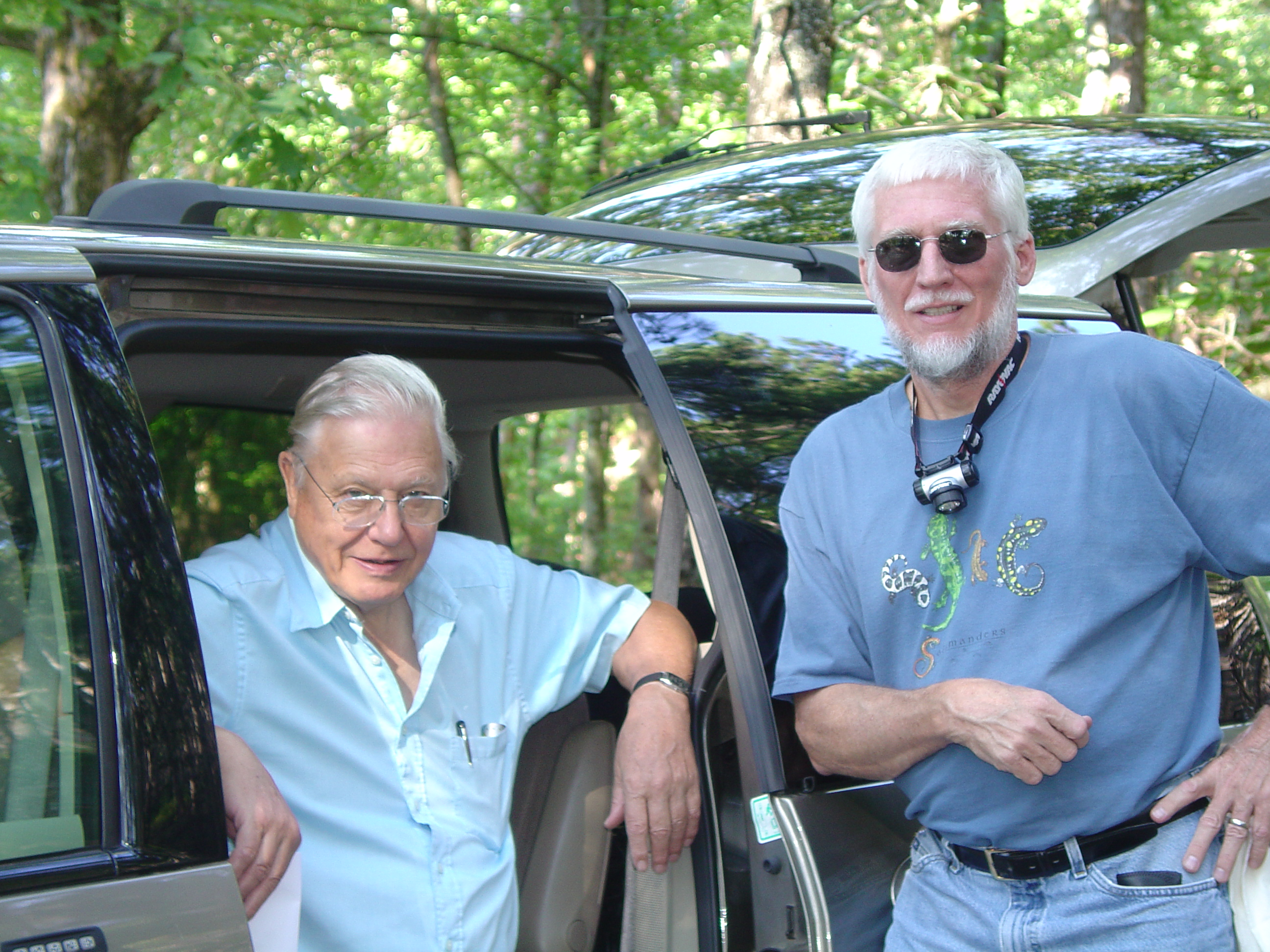
David Attenborough and Stan Trauth discuss salamanders on the set of Life in Cold Blood in the Ouachita Mountains of Arkansas.

Trauth's parental care studies on the western slimy salamander (Plethodon albagula) conducted with coauthors Robyn Jordan, Joseph Milanovich, David Saugey and Malcolm L. McCallum drew international attention when David Attenborough of the BBC chose to cover their work on his mini-series Life in Cold Blood. The group met Attenborough in the Ouachita Mountains of southwestern Arkansas and he descended into an abandoned mine shaft where female western slimy salamanders were found on the walls guarding their eggs from predators, including other females of their species. In one case, a female returned to the same ledge in the back of the mine each year for several years in a row. His work has also been featured on Dirty Jobs with Mike Rowe and by news outlets.

== Teaching ==
Trauth has advised and graduated two PhD students while faculty at Arkansas State University: Malcolm L. McCallum (2003) and Benjamin A. Wheeler (2005). He also graduated master's degree students including the following who later earned their PhD from other advisors: Brian Butterfield (Freed-Hardeman University), Walter E. Meshaka, Jr. (State Museum of Pennsylvania), Richard (Heath) Rauschenberger (US Fish and Wildlife Service), and Joseph Milanovich (Loyola University of Chicago).

== Publications and editing ==
He has authored or co-authored over 377 scientific articles with an h-index of 19. Trauth served as editor-in-chief for the Arkansas Academy of Science from 1992 to 2008. His 2004 co-authored book, published in 2004 by the University of Arkansas Press titled, The Amphibians and Reptiles of Arkansas, is the state's first and only comprehensive guide for herps. He was awarded the ASU Board of Trustees Faculty Award for Excellence in research/Scholarship in 2004. His book Amphibians and Reptiles of Arkansas, which he coauthored with Henry Robison (Southern Arkansas University) and Mike Plummer (Harding University) was said to "raise the bar for state herpetology guides," and "serve as a contemporary model for state and regional contributions in herpetology nationwide." More recently, he and his spouse (Joy Trauth) co-authored the fictional story Salamandria.

== Selected bibliography ==
Books Trauth, S. E., H. W. Robison, and M. V. Plummer. 2004. The Amphibians and Reptiles of Arkansas. University of Arkansas Press, Fayetteville. xviii + 421 pp.

Book chapters

- Trauth, S. E. and David M. Sever. 2011. pp. 412–475. Male urogenital ducts and cloacal anatomy. In Reproductive Biology and Phylogeny of Snakes. (Edited by Robert D. Aldridge and David M. Sever); Series Editor: Barrie G.M. Jamieson. Science Publishers, Enfield, New Hampshire.
- Trauth, S. E. 2005. Ambystoma annulatum, Ringed Salamander. pp. 602–603. In Lannoo, M. J. (Ed.), Amphibian Declines: The Conservation Status of United States Species. University of California Press, Berkeley, CA.
- Trauth, S. E. 2005. Ambystoma talpoideum, Mole Salamander. pp. 632–634. In Lannoo, M. J. (Ed.), Amphibian Declines: The Conservation Status of United States Species. University of California Press, Berkeley, CA.
- Trauth, S. E. 2005. Ambystoma texanum, Small-mouthed Salamander. pp. 634–636. In Lannoo, M. J. (Ed.), Amphibian Declines: The Conservation Status of United States Species. University of California Press, Berkeley, CA.
- Trauth, S. E., and H. A. Dundee. 2005. Eurycea multiplicata, Many-ribbed. pp. 753–755. In Lannoo, M. J. (Ed.), Amphibian Declines: The Conservation Status of United States Species. University of California Press, Berkeley, CA.
- Fenolio, D., and S. E. Trauth. 2005. Typhlotriton spelaeus, Grotto Salamander. pp. 863–866. In Lannoo, M. J. (Ed.), Amphibian Declines: The Conservation Status of United States Species. University of California Press, Berkeley, CA.
- Redmer, M., and S. E. Trauth. 2005. Rana sylvatica, Wood Frog. pp. 590–593. In Lannoo, M. J. (Ed.), Amphibian Declines: The Conservation Status of United States Species. University of California Press, Berkeley, CA.
- Trauth, S. E. and C. T. McAllister. 1996. Cnemidophorus sexlineatus. Catalogue of American Amphibians and Reptiles 628.1-628.12.
