= David M. Sever =

- Born: Canton, Ohio
- Education: Ohio University, Tulane University
- Scientific career
- Fields: Biology
- Workplaces: Southeastern Louisiana University, Saint Mary's College (Indiana)

David M. Sever is an American herpetologist, histologist, anatomist and reproductive biologist. He has been a professor and department head in the Department of Biological Sciences at Southeastern Louisiana University since 2004, and held the Kenneth Dyson Endowed Professorship in Biological Sciences from 2012 to 2015. He is well known for over 30 years of research on the secondary sexual characteristics of salamanders and more generally on comparative histoanatomy of the urogenital systems of vertebrates. and was recognized as the 2013 Distinguished Herpetologist of the Year by the Herpetologists' League.

== Early life ==
A native of Canton, Ohio, Sever was interested in dinosaurs at an early age, but, "You couldn't find dinosaurs, but you could find lizards and turtles, things that looked like dinosaurs." His early exposure to herpetology came from the Boy Scouts, and he is an Eagle Scout.

== Academic career ==
Sever earned his Ph.D. from Tulane University in 1974 where he studied the secondary sexual characters of plethodontid salamanders under Harold A. Dundee. He worked at his first academic post at Saint Mary's College (Indiana) from 1974 to 2004, serving as chair from 1980 to 1989. He has been the Department Head of Biological Sciences at Southeastern Louisiana University since 2004.

== Research ==
Stanley E. Trauth, in his capacity as president of the Herpetologist's League, stated that Sever's research contributions were why he was chosen. "Early in his studies, Dave's histological research focused primarily on salamander cloacal anatomy and, specifically, the spermatheca or sperm storage structure in these animals," said Trauth. "His numerous papers on these structures have dominated the international literature on this subject for decades," and "I consider Dave to be today's world leading authority on vertebrate reproductive histology". "He is without question the foremost histo-herpetologist that has ever lived." Sever discovered and described the plethodontid Junaluska salamander (Eurycea junaluska), which lives in the southern Appalachian Mountains.

== Selected bibliography ==
Sever is the author of over 150 books, articles and volumes in over 100 different outlets. According to Google Scholar, he has an h-index of 40 as of January 2026.

=== Books and chapters ===
- "Eurycea junaluska". Catalogue of American Amphibians and Reptiles. Vol. 321. Society for the Study of Amphibians and Reptiles. 1983. pp. 1–2.
- Jamieson, B. G. M.; Sever, D. M., eds. (2003). Reproductive Biology and Phylogeny of Urodela. Enfield, NH: Science Publishers. ISBN 9781578082858.
- Sever, D. M.; Hamlett, W. C. (2003). "Sperm storage in the class Reptilia". The New Panorama of Animal Evolution. Sofia-Moscow: Pensoft Publishers. pp. 439–446.
- Sever, D. M.; Rania, L. C.; Brizzi, R. (2003). "Sperm storage in the class Amphibia". The New Panorama of Animal Evolution. Sofia-Moscow: Pensoft Publishers. pp. 431–438.
- Ryan, T. J.; Sever, D. M. (2005). "Eurycea junaluska, Junaluska Salamander". In Lannoo, M. J. (ed.). Amphibian Declines. The Conservation Status of United States Species. Berkeley: University of California Press. pp. 745–746.
- Hamlett, W.C.; Knight, D. P.; Pereira, F. T. V.; Steele, J.; Sever, D. M. (2005). "Oviducal glands in Chondrichthyans". In Hamlett, W. C. (ed.). Reproductive Biology and Phylogeny of Chondrichthyes Sharks, Batoids and Chimaeras. Vol. 3. Enfield, NH: Science Publishers. pp. 301–335.
- Eckstut, M. E.; Sever, D. M.; White, M. E.; Crother, B. I. (2009). "Phylogenetic analysis of sperm storage in female squamates". In Dahnof, L. T. (ed.). Animal Reproduction: New Research Developments. Hauppauge, NY: Nova Science Publishers. p. s185–218.
- Sever, D. M.; Staub, N. L. (2010). "5. Horomones, Sex Accessory Structures, and Secondary Sexual Characteristics in Amphibians". In Norris, D. O.; Lopez, K. H. (eds.). Horomones and Reproduction of Vertebrates. Vol. 2. Academic Press. pp. 83–98.
- Aldridge, R. D.; Sever, D. M., eds. (2011). Reproductive Biology and Phylogeny of Snakes. CRC Press. ISBN 9781578087013.
  - Siegel, D. S.; Miralles, A.; Rheubert, J. L.; Sever, D. M. (2015). Female reproductive anatomy: cloaca, oviduct, and sperm storage. Boca Raton, FL: CRC Press. pp. 144–195.
  - Rheubert, J. L.; Sever, D. M.; Siegel, D. S.; Trauth, S. E. (2015). Male reproductive anatomy: The gonads, gonadoducts, sexual segment of the kidney, and cloaca. pp. 253–301.
- Trauth, S. E.; Sever, D. M. (2011). "Male urogenital ducts and cloacal anatomy". Reproductive Biology and Phylogeny of Snakes. Boca Raton, FL: CRC Press. pp. 411–475.
- Aldridge, R. D.; Sever, D. M., eds. (2011). Reproductive Biology and Phylogeny of Snakes. Boca Raton, FL: CRC Press. doi:10.1201/b10879.
- Jenkins, O. P., ed. (2013). "Cloacae, cloacal glands and female sperm storage in giant salamanders". Advances in Zoology Research. Vol. 5. Nova Science Publishers. pp. 1–40.

=== Articles ===
- "The discovery of Eurycea junaluska". Bulletin of the Chicago Herpetological Society. 19: 75–84. 1984.
- "Comparative anatomy and phylogeny of the cloacae of salamanders (Amphibia: Caudata). VI. Ambystomatidae and Dicamptodontidae". Journal of Morphology. 212: 305–322. 1992. doi:10.1002/jmor.1052120309.
- "Female sperm storage in amphibians". Journal of Experimental Zoology. 292: 165–179. 2001. doi:10.1002/jez.1152.
- Sever, D. M.; Hamlett, W. C. (2002). "Female sperm storage in reptiles". Journal of Experimental Zoology. 292: 187–199. doi:10.1002/jez.1154.
- "Reproductive Biology and Phylogeny of Gymnophiona (Caecilians). Reproductive Biology and Phylogeny Series, Volume 5. Edited by Jean‐Marie Exbrayat. Enfield (New Hampshire): Science Publishers. $108.00. xii + 395 p; ill.; index. ISBN: 1‐57808‐312‐5. 2006". Quarterly Review of Biology. 82: 160. 2007. doi:10.1086/519614.
- Sever, D. M.; Rheubert, J. L.; Gautreaux, J.; Hill, T. G.; Freeborn, L. R. (2012). "Observations on the sexual segment of the kidney of snakes with emphasis on ultrastructure in the Yellow-Bellied Sea Snake, Pelamis platurus". Anatomical Record. 295: 872–885. doi:10.1002/ar.22435.
- Sever, D. M.; Rheubert, J. L.; Hill, T. A.; Siegel, D. S. (2013). "Observations on variation in the ultrastructure of the proximal testicular ducts of the Ground Skink, Scincella lateralis (Reptilia: Squamata)". Journal of Morphology. 274: 429–446. doi:10.1002/jmor.20104.
- Rheubert, J. L.; Cree, A.; Downes, M.; Sever, D. M. (2013). "Reproductive morphology of the male Tuatara, Sphenodon punctatus". Acta Zoologica. 94: 454–461. doi:10.1111/j.1463-6395.2012.00574.x.
- Sever, D. M.; Siegel, D. S. (2015). "Histology and ultrastructure of the caudal courtship glands of the Red-Backed Salamander, Plethodon cinereus (Amphibia: Plethodontidae)". Journal of Morphology. 276: 319–330. doi:10.1002/jmor.20342.
