= R. Bruce Bury =

American herpetologist

- Born: November 22, 1942 (age 83); Roseburg, Oregon
- Education: Humboldt State University; California State University-Sacramento; University of California Berkeley
- Scientific career
- Fields: Biology
- Workplaces: United States Geological Survey

Richard Bruce Bury (born November 22, 1942, in Roseburg, Oregon), a pioneer in the study of herpetofauna (amphibians and reptiles), is an American conservationist, herpetologist, and natural historian and Scientist Emeritus of the United States Geological Survey. Bury, C. Kenneth Dodd, Jr. and Gary Fellers were the first to suggest widespread amphibian declines were progressing. In 1972, Bury became the first person hired by the United States Department of the Interior under the specific title of Herpetologist. In 2009, the American Society of Ichthyologists and Herpetologists (ASIH) made Bury the 11th herpetologist awarded the annual Henry S. Fitch Award for Excellence in Herpetology. Bury is a founding governing board member and executive editor of the journal Herpetological Conservation and Biology. For more than 30 years, Bury has studied herpetofauna ecology and conservation, including the effects of invasive species and wildfire on populations. Thanks in part to his efforts, herpetofauna are recognized as important indicators of ecosystem health.
