= Herpetological Conservation and Biology =

- Discipline: Herpetology
- Language: English
- Edited by: R. Bruce Bury

Publication details
- History: 2006–present
- Publisher: Herpetological Conservation and Biology (United States)
- Frequency: Triannually
- Open access: Yes
- Impact factor: 0.595 (2014)

Standard abbreviations
- ISO 4: Herpetol. Conserv. Biol.

Indexing
- ISSN: 2151-0733 (print); 1931-7603 (web)
- OCLC no.: 427887140

Links
- Journal homepage; Online archive

Herpetological Conservation and Biology is a peer-reviewed open access scientific journal established in 2006 that covers the conservation, management, and natural history of reptiles and amphibians. It publishes up to three regular issues per year as well as occasional monographs.

== History and production ==
The journal was established in 2006, with the first issue appearing in September. In 2012 it was included in the Journal Citation Reports. In September 2014, the journal became an incorporated nonprofit corporation.

The editor-in-chief is R. Bruce Bury (US Geological Survey). The journal is open access and does not charge article processing fees or per-page costs to authors, without any limitations on article length. The journal has been cited as a successful model of low-cost academic publishing with production costs, paid by the editorial staff, of around US$100 per year.

== Abstracting and indexing ==
The journal is abstracted and indexed in:

- Current Contents/Agriculture, Biology & Environmental Sciences
- Science Citation Index Expanded
- Scopus
- The Zoological Record
- EMBiology

According to the Journal Citation Reports, the journal has a 2014 impact factor of 0.595.
