= Dominique's =

Former French restaurant in Washington DC

- Interactive map of Dominique's

Restaurant information
- Location: 1921 Pennsylvania Avenue NW, Washington D.C.
- Coordinates: 38.90088°N 77.04469°W

Dominique's was a fine-dining French restaurant on the 1900 block of Pennsylvania Avenue NW in the Foggy Bottom neighborhood of Washington, D.C. Dominique D'Ermo owned the restaurant until he sold it in 1987 to Herb Ezrin. The restaurant's clientele included such notables as Warren Beatty, Ronald Reagan, Robert Redford, Ted Koppel and Frank Sinatra. By 1991, it had gone into Chapter 11 bankruptcy, and by August 27, 1994, all that was to be auctioned off had been sold.

Dominique's was considered "as (far as) Washington restaurants go, as good a place to see — and to be seen — as any." It was known for its "culinary exotica" such as alligator, llama, and hippopotamus, and its annual races on Bastille Day for their wait staff.

D'Ermo bought the former restaurant Jacqueline's in 1972. Willie Morris, a writer for Harper's Magazine and a guest columnist for The Washington Star, had dinner there. He wrote a rave review and by 1973, Dominique's had moved across the street to a larger space.

Naval Mehre reopened Dominique's, with D'Ermo, at the Watergate complex at 600 New Hampshire Avenue, NW across from the John F. Kennedy Center for the Performing Arts. The plan was for the menu to be American Continental cuisine.
