= Walter E. Meshaka Jr. =

- Born: Worcester, Massachusetts
- Education: Florida International University; Arkansas State University; University of South Florida
- Scientific career
- Fields: Biology
- Workplaces: State Museum of Pennsylvania

Walter E. Meshaka Jr. is an American herpetologist and natural historian. He was the supervisory curator for the four National Parks in southern Florida from 1995 to 2000. In 2000 he became the Senior Curator of Zoology and Botany at the State Museum of Pennsylvania in Harrisburg, Pennsylvania. His research has been covered by Lawrence Journal-World, among other news outlets.

== Early life and education ==
Meshaka was born in Worcester to Lebanese-American parents of Melkite Catholic Christian heritage. He earned a B.S. in biology in 1985 from the University of South Florida. Then, he earned a M.S. in Biology in 1988 from Arkansas State University, and completed his Ph.D. in 1994 at the Florida International University

== Research ==
His primary focus is on North American and exotic amphibians and reptiles with a strong connection to the herpetofauna of southern Florida.

J. Whitfield Gibbons noted, "Meshaka’s thoughtful afterword on exotic species introductions to Florida offers some achievable solutions for controlling the influx of more herpetofauna.". He published four pocket field guides with Joseph T. Collins largely "intended to raise public awareness". Their "Pocket Guide to Lizards and Turtles" is said to be "useful for all naturalists to carry with them in eastern Canada. It is especially ideal for junior naturalists as a “starter” guide."

Meshaka has collaborated with the Carnegie Museum of Natural History's Powdermill Nature Reserve on field herpetology research. A long-term mark-recapture study of the ten species of snakes occurring at the preserve has ensued since 2002. He has resurrected and continued a long-term study on Eastern Box Turtles and Wood Turtles that was established by Graham Netting in 1958 and continued until Netting's death in 1996.

== Selected bibliography ==
Books

- 2001. The Cuban Treefrog in Florida: Life History of a Successful Colonizing Species. University Press of Florida. Gainesville, FL. (W.E. Meshaka Jr.). 191 pp.
- 2004. The Exotic Amphibians and Reptiles of Florida. Krieger Publishing Company. Melbourne, FL. (W.E. Meshaka Jr., B.P. Butterfield, and J.B. Hauge). 155 pp.
- 2005. Amphibians and Reptiles: Status and Conservation in Florida. Krieger Publishing Company. Melbourne, FL. (W.E. Meshaka Jr. and K.J. Babbitt, editors). 317 pp.
- 2009. A Pocket Guide to Pennsylvania Snakes. Mennonite Press. Newton, KS. (W.E. Meshaka Jr. and J.T. Collins). 51 pp.
- 2010. A Pocket Guide to Pennsylvania Frogs and Toads. Mennonite Press. Newton, KS. (W.E. Meshaka Jr. and J.T. Collins). 40 pp.
- 2012. A Pocket Guide to Pennsylvania Salamanders. Mennonite Press. Newton, KS. (W.E. Meshaka Jr. and J.T. Collins). 51 pp.
- 2012. A Pocket Guide to Pennsylvania Turtles and Lizards. Mennonite Press. Newton, KS. (W.E. Meshaka Jr. and J.T. Collins). 39 pp.

Monographs

- 2011. A Runaway Train in the Making: The Exotic Amphibians, Reptiles, Turtles, and Crocodilians of Florida. Herpetological Conservation and Biology, Monograph I, Vol. 6:1-101. (W.E. Meshaka Jr.).
- 2015. The Herpetology of Southern Florida. (W.E. Meshaka Jr. and J.N. Layne). Herpetological Conservation and Biology 10(Monograph 5):1-353.
